= Brant Bjork discography =

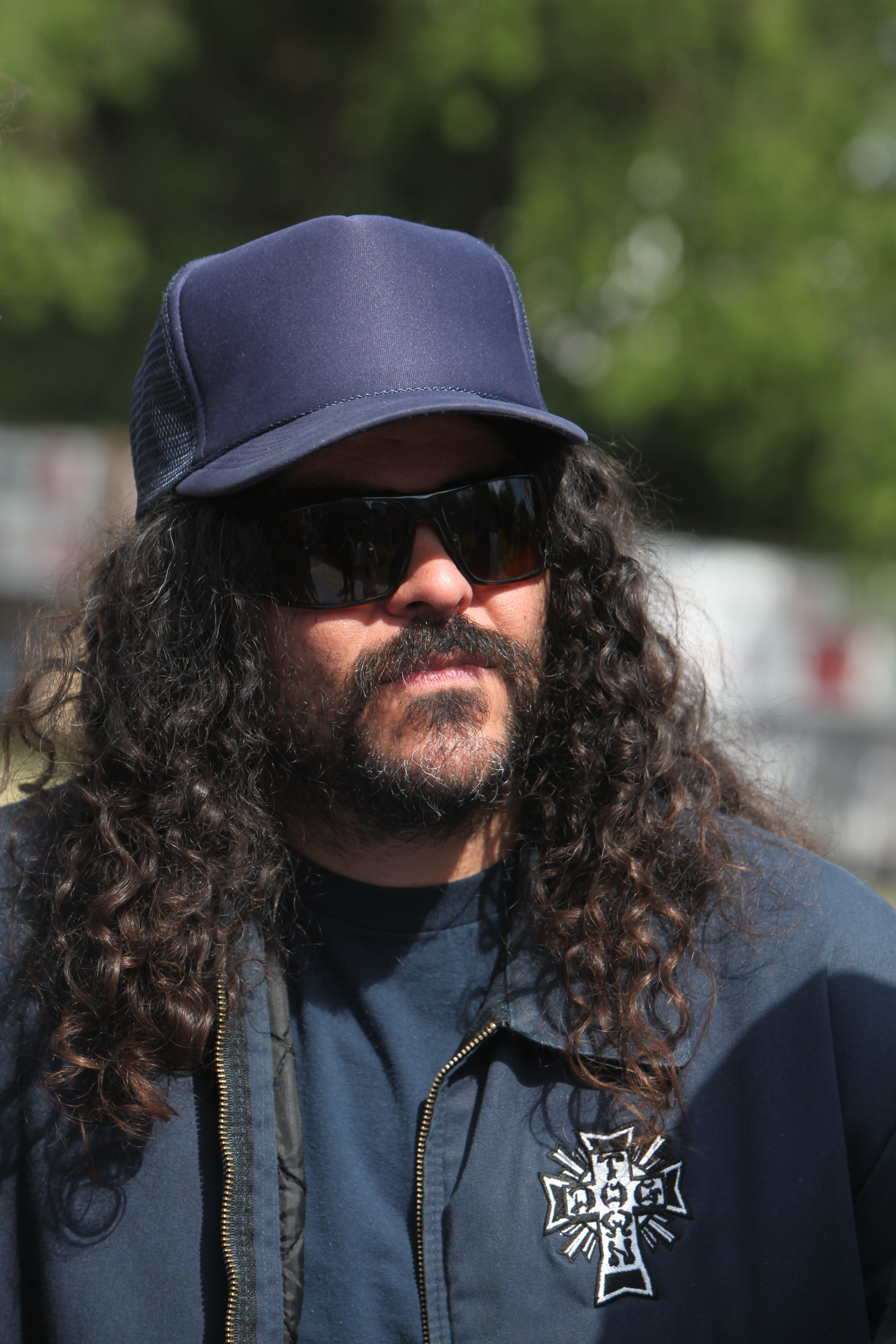
Brant Bjork with Kyuss Lives! in 2011.

The following is the discography of Californian stoner rock musician Brant Bjork. Bjork has released sixteen studio albums and one live album as a solo artist, appeared on multiple albums as a member of bands such as Kyuss, Fu Manchu and Mondo Generator, and collaborated with different artists and made guest appearances on several recordings.

== Solo albums ==
Brant Bjork

- Jalamanta (October 11, 1999)
- Brant Bjork & the Operators (April 30, 2002)
- Keep Your Cool (October 21, 2003)
- Local Angel (August 10, 2004)
- Tres Dias (February 27, 2007)
- Punk Rock Guilt (May 13, 2008)
- Gods & Goddesses (March 30, 2010)
- Tao of the Devil (September 30, 2016)
- Europe '16 (September 22, 2017)
- Mankind Woman (September 14, 2018)
- Jacoozzi (April 5, 2019)
- Brant Bjork (May 8, 2020)
- Bougainvillea Suite (October 28, 2022)

Brant Bjork and the Bros

- Saved by Magic (August 1, 2005)
- Somera Sól (May 8, 2007)
- Live in the High Desert (July 18, 2025)

Brant Bjork and the Low Desert Punk Band

- Black Power Flower (November 14, 2014)

Brant Bjork Trio

- Once Upon a Time in the Desert (September 20, 2024)

== Group albums ==
=== Kyuss ===
Year	Title	Notes
1990	Sons of Kyuss	Drums
1991	Wretch	Drums, Composer, Lyricist
1992	Blues for the Red Sun	Drums, Concept, Composer, Lyricist
1994	(Welcome to) Sky Valley	Drums, Composer, Lyricist, last w/ Kyuss, left then later joined Fu Manchu
2000	Muchas Gracias: The Best of Kyuss	Drums, Composer, Lyricist

=== De-Con ===
Year	Title	Notes
1995	Balls for Days	Drums

=== Fu Manchu ===
Year	Title	Notes
1994	No One Rides for Free	Producer
1997	The Action Is Go	Drums
1998	Jailbreak split 7-inch w/ Fatso Jetson	Drums
1999	Eatin' Dust	Drums
1999	King of the Road	Drums
2001	California Crossing	Drums

=== Ché ===
Year	Title	Notes
2000	Sounds of Liberation	Guitar, Vocals

=== Mondo Generator ===
Year	Title	Notes
2000	Cocaine Rodeo	Drums ("13th Floor", "Simple Exploding Man", "Cocaine Rodeo")
2003	A Drug Problem That Never Existed	Drums
2004	Use Once and Destroy Me (DVD)	Drums
2006	"I Never Sleep" – 7-inch	Drums ("Here We Come", "Allen's Wrench")
2008	Australian Tour EP 2008	Drums ("Unless I Can Kill", "Simple Exploding Man")
2009	Cocaine Rodeo Reissue - (Bonus Live Disc)	Drums

=== Vista Chino ===
Year	Title	Notes
2013	Peace	Drums, Percussion, Bass, Vocals, Producer

=== Stöner ===
Year	Title	Notes
2021	Live in the Mojave Desert: Volume 4	Guitar, Vocals
2021	Stoners Rule	Guitar, Vocals
2022	Totally...	Guitar, Vocals
2023	Boogie to Baja	Guitar, Vocals
2024	Hittin' the Bitchin' Switch	Guitar, Vocals

== Collaborations ==
Year	Title	Notes
1995	Gossamer – Solarfeast	Producer (released on El Camino Records)
1997	7-inch Single – LAB	Guitar, ("Burning Leaf", "Chihuahua")
1998	7-inch Singles – Fatso Jetson	Guitar, ("Blueberries & Chrome", "Swollen Offering", "Accelerator General")
1998	Welcome to Meteor City – Meteor City	Guitar, Fatso Jetson song ("Procrastination Process")
1998	Vols. 1&2 – Desert Sessions	Drums, Bass, & Percussion
1999	Vols. 5&6 – Desert Sessions	Drums, Guitar
2004	Auf Der Maur – Auf der Maur	Drums, ("Followed The Waves", "My Foggy Notion")
2005	Demon Crossing – Yellow #5	Drums
2005	Cowboy Coffee and Burned Knives – Hulk	Guest appearance, "Seducer" (hidden track)
2006	Sabbia (DVD)	Composer, Concept
2006	Extraterrestrial Highway – Ten East	Bass
2006	I Got Time – OJM	Guest appearance, "I Got Time"
2012	Earthlings? (reissue) – Earthlings?	Congas, "Lightning Song" (bonus track)
2015	18th Anniversary – OJM	Guest appearance, "Jam of Wine"
2018	Bunny Rumble – Bunny Racket	Guest appearance, "Big Brown Dog" w/ Robby Krieger
2023	Folklore From The Other Desert Cities – Mario Lalli & The Rubber Snake Charmers	Guitar

== Singles ==
- "Controllers Destroyed (live)" (July 28, 2017)
- "The Gree Heen (live)" (August 25, 2017)
- "Chocolatize" (July 3, 2018)
- "Swagger & Sway" (August 20, 2018)
- "Charlie Gin" (August 31, 2018)
- "Guerrilla Funk" (January 31, 2019)
- "Oui" (March 25, 2019)
- "Jungle in the Sound" (January 21, 2020)
- "Duke of Dynamite" (March 10, 2020)
- "Cleaning out the Ashtray" (April 28, 2020)
- "Trip on the Wine" (July 19, 2022)
- "Bread for Butter" (September 14, 2022)
