= List of Palm Desert Scene bands =

Notable bands and musicians within the Palm Desert Scene include the following:

== Scene musicians ==
- Gary Arce
- Bob Balch
- Brant Bjork
- Joey Castillo
- Dave Catching
- Al Cisneros
- Chris Cockrell
- Fred Drake
- Dean Fertita
- John Garcia
- Eddie Glass
- Chris Goss
- Chris Hakius
- Matt Helders
- Alfredo Hernández
- Scott Hill
- Josh Homme
- Jesse Hughes
- Alain Johannes
- Larry Lalli
- Mario Lalli
- Mark Lanegan
- John McBain
- Brian O'Connor
- Nick Oliveri
- Matt Pike
- Ted Quinn
- Scott Reeder (bassist)
- Scott Reeder (drummer)
- Ruben Romano
- Pete Stahl
- Bill Stinson
- Tony Tornay
- Gene Trautmann
- Troy Van Leeuwen

== Bands ==
- Big Scenic Nowhere
- Brant Bjork and the Bros
- Brant Bjork and the Low Desert Punk Band
- Ché
- CRX
- Dali's Llama
- Desert Sessions
- Eagles of Death Metal
- Earthless
- Fatso Jetson
- Fever Dog
- Fu Manchu
- Goatsnake
- Gone Is Gone
- Gram Rabbit
- Hermano
- John Garcia and the Band of Gold
- Kyuss
- Masters of Reality
- Mondo Generator
- Nebula
- Orquesta del Desierto
- Queens of the Stone Age
- Rogue Ogre
- Sleazy Cortez
- Slo Burn
- Stöner
- Ten East
- The Holy Corrupt
- Thin White Rope
- Throw Rag
- Unida
- Vista Chino
- Waxy
- Whiskey and Knives
- Yawning Man
- Yawning Sons
