= Orquesta del Desierto =

American desert rock band

- Origin: United States
- Genres: Desert rock, stoner rock
- Years active: 2002–present (on hiatus)
- Label: MeteorCity
- Members: Pete Stahl; Dandy Brown; Mike Riley; Mario Lalli; Country Mark Engel; Adam Maples; Pete Davidson
- Past members: Alfredo Hernández
- Website: spinningfish.com/odd

Orquesta del Desierto is an American desert rock band from Palm Desert, California. Founded upon music inspired and written by producer Dandy Brown (Hermano), members of the band include or have included vocalist Pete Stahl (Scream, Goatsnake, Wool), drummer Alfredo Hernández (Kyuss, Queens of the Stone Age, Ché), guitarist Mario Lalli (Fatso Jetson, Yawning Man) and guitarists Mike Riley and Country Mark Engel. The band released two albums to date: an eponymous debut in 2002 and a follow-up in 2003, appropriately titled "Dos".

The band dissolved in 2006 as members moved on to pursue other projects.

== Discography ==
- Orquesta del Desierto, released by MeteorCity on May 20, 2002. Recorded at the GreenRoom in Palm Springs, California.
- Dos, released by Alone Records/The Stone Circle on October 27, 2003 (limited edition digipak) and by MeteorCity on February 10, 2004. Recorded at Rancho de la Luna in Joshua Tree, California.

== See also ==
- Palm Desert Scene
