= Psychedelic metal =

Psychedelic metal may refer to:

- Stoner rock
- Palm Desert Scene
- Psychedelic rock
- Psychedelia
