= Somera Sól =

Studio album by Brant Bjork and the Bros
- Released: May 8, 2007
- Studio: Donner and Blitzen, Arcadia, California
- Genre: Stoner rock; desert rock
- Length: 48:43
- Label: Duna Records; Low Desert Punk (2008 reissue); Heavy Psych Sounds Records (2022 reissue)
- Producer: Brant Bjork & Ryan Snyder

Brant Bjork & the Bros chronology
Saved by Magic (2005)	Somera Sól (2007)	Live in the High Desert (2025)

Brant Bjork chronology
Tres Dias (2007)	Somera Sól (2007)	Punk Rock Guilt (2008)

Alternative cover
- Low Desert Punk reissue

Reissue cover
- Heavy Psych Sounds reissue

Professional ratings
Review scores
Source	Rating
AllMusic	3.5/5 stars
antiMusic	4.5/5 stars

Somera Sól is the second album by the stoner rock band Brant Bjork and the Bros, and the seventh solo album by Brant Bjork. It was released on May 8 2007, and features former Kyuss drummer Alfredo Hernandez, in addition to guest appearances by Sean Wheeler of Throw Rag and Mario Lalli of Fatso Jetson. The album was reissued by Brant Bjork's former record label Low Desert Punk in 2008 with altered artwork, and again in 2022 by Bjork's current record label Heavy Psych Sounds Records featuring new artwork.

== Track listing ==
All lyrics are written by Brant Bjork, except where noted; all music is composed by Brant Bjork, except where noted.

No.	Title	Lyrics	Music	Length
1.	"Turn Yourself On"			4:25
2.	"Love Is Revolution"			4:59
3.	"Shrine Communications"			4:00
4.	"Oblivion"			2:52
5.	"The Native Tongue"			5:01
6.	"Freaks of Nature"	Bjork, Sean Wheeler		5:46
7.	"Ultimate Kickback"			5:29
8.	"Chinarosa"			4:37
9.	"Lion Wings"			6:26
10.	"Blood in the Gallery"	Mario Lalli	Dylan Roche	4:38

== Personnel ==
The Bros

- Brant Bjork – guitar, vocals
- Dylan Roche – bass
- Scott "Cortez" Silverman – guitar
- Alfredo Hernández – drums, percussion

Additional Bros

- Mario Lalli – vocals, guitar
- Vince Meghrouni – saxophone, flute
- Olive Lalli – vocals
- Sean Wheeler – vocals

== Credits ==
- Recorded and mixed by Mathias Cornelius von Schneeberger at Donner and Blitzen Arcadia, California.
- Mastered by Evren Gokner at Capitol.
- Produced by Brant Bjork and Ryan Snyder for Duna Productions.
- Duna art direction - Cale Bunker
- Cover art - Bunker/Bjork

== Notes ==
Besides the Sabbia soundtrack, the album contains the first studio recording of "Ultimate Kickback," a song which Brant has been performing live since 2004.
