= Alfredo Hernández =

American drummer

- Genres: Stoner rock; desert rock; heavy metal; hard rock
- Occupation: Musician
- Instrument: Drums
- Years active: 1985–present
- Labels: Elektra (1995); Duna (2000–present)
- Member of: Avon; Whiskey and Knives; Brave Black Sea
- Formerly of: Queens of the Stone Age; Kyuss; Across the River; Ché; Yawning Man; Mondo Generator; Fatso Jetson; Brant Bjork and the Bros

Alfredo Hernández is an American drummer best known as a former member of desert rock bands Kyuss, Queens of the Stone Age, Brant Bjork and the Bros and Yawning Man, and as a current member of the band Avon.

== Career ==
Hernández joined Kyuss in 1994, replacing previous drummer Brant Bjork who had left the band for personal reasons. Kyuss' Josh Homme stated at the time that Hernández was the only drummer considered for the job. He appeared on the band's final studio album ...And the Circus Leaves Town. Kyuss soon went on indefinite hiatus in October 1995. Hernandez subsequently drummed on Queens of the Stone Age's self-titled debut record released in 1998. In 2004 he recorded an EP, and briefly toured, with former Queens of the Stone Age bassist Nick Oliveri's band, Mondo Generator.

Hernández was a founding member of the band Yawning Man, and later teamed up with fellow ex-Kyuss drummer Brant Bjork and Dave Dinsmore to form Ché. The 2000 album Sounds of Liberation was the only material which the band recorded and, after a small tour of live shows, the band disbanded, with Hernández joining Orquesta del Desierto. Later he joined Brant Bjork & The Bros on their album Somera Sól and toured with them in 2007.

Hernández played in Vic Du Monte's Persona Non Grata with Chris Cockrell and James Childs until 2011, recording three albums, two EPs and completing 10 tours since 2005. He currently plays in the desert hardcore band "Family Butcher" Hernández is also involved in a project with Mike Neider (Bl'ast/LAB) and Dave Dinsmore (Bl'ast/LAB/Unida/Che) called "Gusto".

Fellow Desert Rock drummer Brant Bjork described his relationship with Alfredo:

I’ve known Alfredo since I was 13. Alfredo called me, we were all living in the desert at the time. Alfredo had just gotten off of the road with Queens of the Stone Age and he gave me a call and said ‘look man, I just left the band’ and I said, ‘oh wow, OK’ and we chatted about that. - Brant Bjork

It’s hard to change drummers after four years but we knew Fredo was the man. He was the first person I thought of and the only person I called - Brant Bjork

== Equipment ==
Ludwig Drums

- 14" Steel Snare Drum
- 14" tom-tom
- 18" Floor Tom
- 28" Bass Drum

Zildjian Cymbals

- 14" A Mastersound Hi-Hats
- 18" A Medium Crash
- 19" A Custom Projection Crash
- 22" A Custom Medium Ride

Zildjian Drumsticks, currently a 5B, with Kyuss he used the Zildjian Rock Stick

== Discography ==
- ...And the Circus Leaves Town - Kyuss, 1995
- Planet Mamon - The Sort Of Quartet, 1995
- Bombas De Amor - The Sort Of Quartet, 1996
- Shine!/Short Term Memory Loss - Kyuss, 1996
- Into The Void - Kyuss, 1996
- Kyuss/Queens of the Stone Age - Kyuss and Queens of the Stone Age, 1997
- Volumes 1 & 2 - Desert Sessions, 1997
- Volumes 3 & 4 - Desert Sessions, 1998
- Queens of the Stone Age - Queens of the Stone Age, 1998
- Sounds of Liberation - Ché, 2000
- Muchas Gracias: The Best of Kyuss - Kyuss, 2000
- Orquestra Del Desierto - Orquestra Del Desierto, 2002
- III The EP - Mondo Generator, 2004
- Person Non Grata - Vic du Monte's Persona Non Grata, 2005
- Rock Formations LP - Yawning Man, 2005
- Pot Head EP - Yawning Man, 2005
- Live at W2 Den Bosch. Netherlands. (DVD) - Yawning Man, 2005
- Vista Point - Yawning Man, 2007
- Dead Planet - Mondo Generator, 2007
- Somera Sól - Brant Bjork and the Bros, 2007
- Sweet Sixteen (EP) - Vic du Monte's Persona Non Grata, 2007
- Re Dinamite (Split EP) - Vic du Monte's Persona Non Grata, 2009
- Autoblond - Vic du Monte's Persona Non Grata, 2009
- Barons & Bankers - Vic du Monte's Persona Non Grata, 2010
- Nomadic Pursuits - Yawning Man, 2010
- Split EP w/ Fatso Jetson - Yawning Man, 2013
- Fragments - Brave Black Sea, 2014
