= Jalamanta =

- Duna release

Studio album by Brant Bjork
- Released: October 11, 1999
- Recorded: February 1999
- Studios: Rancho de la Luna, Joshua Tree, California
- Genres: Stoner rock; desert rock
- Length: 57:03
- Labels: Man's Ruin Records; Duna Records; Low Desert Punk; Heavy Psych Sounds
- Producer: Rosa

Brant Bjork chronology
| Jalamanta (1999) | Brant Bjork & the Operators (2002) |

Alternative cover
- Man's Ruin release

Re-release cover
- Heavy Psych Sounds release

Professional ratings
Review scores
| Source | Rating |
|---|---|
| AllMusic | 3/5 stars |
| Hellbound.ca | 8/10 |
| MikeLadano.com | 5/5 stars |

Jalamanta is the stoner rock and Palm Desert scene musician Brant Bjork's debut solo album after leaving Kyuss and joining Fu Manchu. Originally released on October 11, 1999, through Man's Ruin Records, Jalamanta was later re-released on Bjork's own label, Duna Records, in 2003, 2006 and 2009. In 2019, Bjork's current label, Heavy Psych Sounds, released a remixed and remastered version of the album with new artwork.

== Background and release ==
Following his departure from Kyuss in 1994, Bjork played and collaborated with several different bands, including producing Fu Manchu's debut album No One Rides for Free, and founded the independent label El Camino Records, later renamed to Duna Records and Low Desert Punk. He released debut albums by stoner rock band Solarfeast and hardcore punk band De-Con through his label in 1995, which he also produced and performed drums on respectively. In 1996, he joined former Kyuss bandmate Josh Homme in his Palm Desert musical collective series The Desert Sessions, appearing on Volumes 1 & 2 and Volumes 5 & 6 released in 1998 and 1999 respectively. Bjork joined Fu Manchu in 1996 and appeared on their The Action Is Go album the following year.

In February 1999, Bjork rented a week's worth of studio time at Rancho de la Luna in Joshua Tree for the recording of his debut solo album. Jalamanta was released on October 11 that same year through Man's Ruin Records. The album received a positive reception and featured Bjork performing all the instruments, in addition to including lyric and vocal contributions from Mario Lalli of Fatso Jetson. Jalamanta's musical style drew comparisons to Bjork's former band Kyuss, as BraveWords noted, "If Kyuss represents the desert at its harshest, all heatwaves and howling winds and Gila monsters, then the Jalamanta album is the desert at its most tranquil; peaceful, spacious and calm." The album would later be re-released through Duna Records in 2003, 2006 and 2009, and for its 20th anniversary in 2019, a remixed and remastered version was released through Heavy Psych Sounds.

== Track listing ==
All tracks are written by Brant Bjork, except where noted.

| No. | Title | Writer(s) | Length |
|---|---|---|---|
| 1. | "Lazy Bones" | | 1:27 |
| 2. | "Automatic Fantastic" | | 6:55 |
| 3. | "Cobra Jab" | | 3:19 |
| 4. | "Too Many Chiefs...Not Enough Indians" | | 3:45 |
| 5. | "Sun Brother" | | 4:50 |
| 6. | "Let's Get Chinese Eyes" | | 4:51 |
| 7. | "Toot" | Brant Bjork; Mario Lalli | 6:03 |
| 8. | "Defender of the Oleander" | | 7:58 |
| 9. | "Low Desert Punk" | | 5:21 |
| 10. | "Waiting for the Coconut to Drop" | | 4:16 |
| 11. | "Her Brown Blood" | | 4:11 |
| 12. | "Indio" | | 4:07 |
| Total length: | | | 57:03 |

Vinyl and Heavy Psych Sounds reissue bonus track
| No. | Title | Writer(s) | Length |
|---|---|---|---|
| 13. | "Take Me Away" (Blue Öyster Cult cover) | Eric Bloom; Aldo Nova | 5:35 |
| Total length: | | | 62:38 |

Notes

- The 2019 reissue features the instrumental intro to "Low Desert Punk", "Bones Lazy", as its own track.

== Personnel ==
- Brant Bjork – drums, guitars, bass, percussion, vocals, painting, photography, layout; cover art painting (Duna edition); producer, remixer (Heavy Psych Sounds edition)
- Rosa – producer, mixer
- Tony Mason – engineer, mixer; remixer (Heavy Psych Sounds edition)
- Mathias "Schneebie" Schneeberger – mastering
- John McBain – remastering (Heavy Psych Sounds edition)
- Mario Lalli – lyrics, vocals ("Toot"), additional guitars
- Gary Arce – additional guitars
- Frank Kozik – layout
- Cale Bunker – artwork, design, layout (Duna edition)
- DUNArt – artwork, design (Duna edition)
- Ryan Jones – art direction (Heavy Psych Sounds edition)
- Joe Herbick – artwork (Heavy Psych Sounds edition)
- Branca Studio – layout (Heavy Psych Sounds edition)
- Sam Grant – photography (Heavy Psych Sounds edition)
