= Joel Fausto =

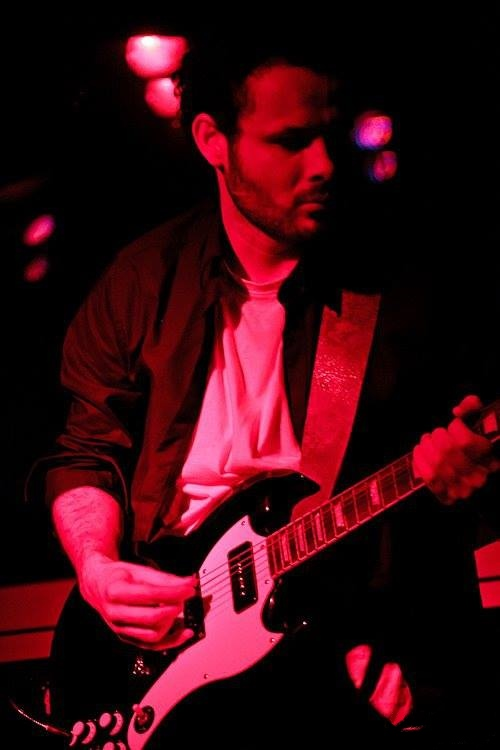
- Joel Fausto at Maus Hábitos, Porto (2012)

Background information
- Born: Joel Ferreira Figueiredo; 9 May 1988 (age 38); Santo Tirso, Porto, Portugal
- Genres: Jazz, experimental, ambient
- Occupations: Musician, multi-instrumentalist, composer, songwriter, producer
- Instruments: Vocals, piano, electronic organ, saxophone, guitar, synthesizers, bass guitar, vibraphone, drums
- Years active: 2002–present
- Labels: Slowdriver Productions, Zigurartists, The Path Less Traveled
- Website: joelfausto.pt

Joel Ferreira Figueiredo (born 9 May 1988), better known by Joel Fausto, is a Portuguese musician, songwriter, composer and record producer. He is known as the frontman of Joel Fausto & Illusion Orchestra, formed in 2008. Also he is associated with his side acts Cajado, Gesso, Manos, Omitir and Forgotten Winter. Fausto's music is generally characterised by a frightening emotions through obsessions, fear, death, love, paranoia and surrealistic scenarios.

Fausto has also worked as a composer for some short films, Déjà Vécu(2015) directed by André Leite e Péu Barbosa from Brazil and Berlin Hustle (2016) directed by Laurent Daniels from Germany.

In 2015, one associated website of the famous TV Series Twin Peaks with the name "Welcome To Twin Peaks" compiled an Audrey Horne (Twin Peaks character) inspired playlist called "Isn't It Too Dreamy?" including Joel Fausto & Illusion Orchestra with names like Aphex Twin, Fleetwood Mac, Leonard Cohen, and others.

== Joel Fausto and Illusion Orchestra (2008–present) ==
Fausto formed his ghost band calling them "Illusion Orchestra" in 2008. Before that, the band had the name of "Vácuo do Outono". Their sound tends to change considerably from one album to another floating between jazz, dirty blues, experimental rock, soundscape or dream pop.

Meet Me In the Bottom was the first self-released album in 2008. Title inspired by the blues of Pink Anderson, Meet Me In The Bottom is about 40 minutes of some weird and dark background soundscape with experimental soundtrack and jazz elements. After that, an EP, called Drawn For The End, was released in 2009.

In 2013, the second album, Illusion Orchestra At The Gloomy Club, was released by the Irish label Psychonavigation Records. Some story about a gloomy club that portrays an abstract and a dark background sound. Illusion Orchestra At The Gloomy Club was monthly presented in the "Late Night Sessions" show by the Irish radio RTÉ 2FM, "Past Haunts" show by KXRY XRAY.FM radio from Portland (US) and "Off The Cuff" show at WZBC 90.3FM radio from Boston (US).

(...)Joel Fausto & Illusion Orchestra goes for the incredible dark atmospheres. A noir vibe can be felt throughout the entire album. Tempos are kept deliberate. Elements of it go for a Western twang. Various instruments are employed, saxophone, vibraphone (heavily), guitar, and other electronic effects. Brought together they create the mixture of jazz with ambient influences. Many moments take quite a bit of time to fully bloom into full-fledged rhythms. Plenty of it is on the quieter side of things. Remaining sparse is highly important for these pieces. Instruments are able to fully breathe. Oftentimes the sheer amount of space can be somewhat worrisome.(...) – ("Beach Sloth Magazine", New York, USA).

The third album Hello was released in 2016 by Slowdriver Productions. Hello is an intriguing and haunted story that put together dream pop with dirty blues and experimental rock.

(...)For me, "Hello" is one of the most atmospheric albums this year. It has darkness, gloom and mysteriousness – and yes, these are definitely the advantages! The album is well composed, it has its own rhythm, sometimes surprising, sudden tonal changes, Fausto’s vocal is deep and distinctive and it’s all ‘topped’ with unexpanded lyrics, that do not overwhelm the sound of music.(...) – (A.M. by "The Eye Of Music" Zine, Poland).

== Early years (2002–2007) ==
14 years old, Joel Fausto started to learn and practice guitar and some synthesizers by himself and did his first experimental compositions one year later. He explored the dark soundscape style featuring Black Metal, recording a few lo-fi and harsh demo tapes and changing many times his pseudonyms. Later, he founded the band Omitir, experimental black metal with shoegaze and jazz influences and entered as a second member of Forgotten Winter with the pseudonym "Trovador". Both bands are still active.

== Larva (2007–2008) ==
In 2007, Joel Fausto formed an experimental / Noise Rock band named Larva with his friend Ruben Sequeira. They recorded many rehearsals with low quality by themselves in a small rehearsal room whose walls were covered in aluminium foil. Sounding noisy, loud, weird and aggressive, Portuguese label Perpetuam Records decided to release in 2008 a demo tape with the homonymous title Larva with those weird tracks. The band never played live and eventually disbanded.

== Cajado (2008–present) ==
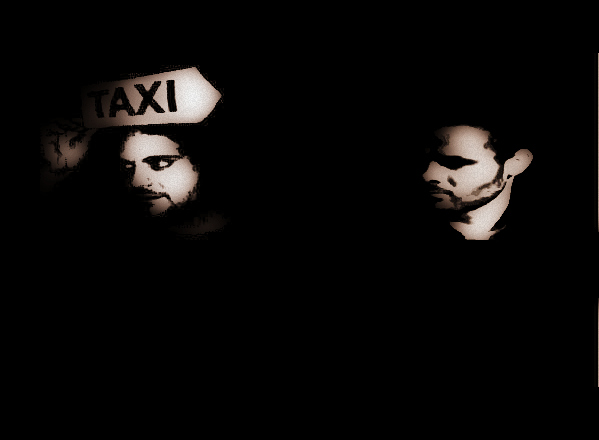
Cajado (2015)

Formed by two college friends in 2008, Daniel Catarino (Singer and songwriter) and Joel Fausto, Cajado was created in the middle of Alentejo (South of Portugal) with only two simple acoustic guitars. Years later, decided to pick some lost tracks they have been recording earlier and decided to make a deal with the Portuguese label Zigurartists to release in 2015 the first EP Anta do Livramento, name of the small spot located in middle of nowhere at Alentejo where it all began. Cajado plays an ambient music soundtrack, soundscape with looped and dirty slide guitars and synthetizers with some western spaghetti influences. Their philosophy is "making music for those who move from the countryside to the city and feel homesick". First live appearance was in the Portuguese alternative music festival TRC Zigurfest in 2015 with other bands from the Portuguese music scene.

== Gesso (2011–present) ==
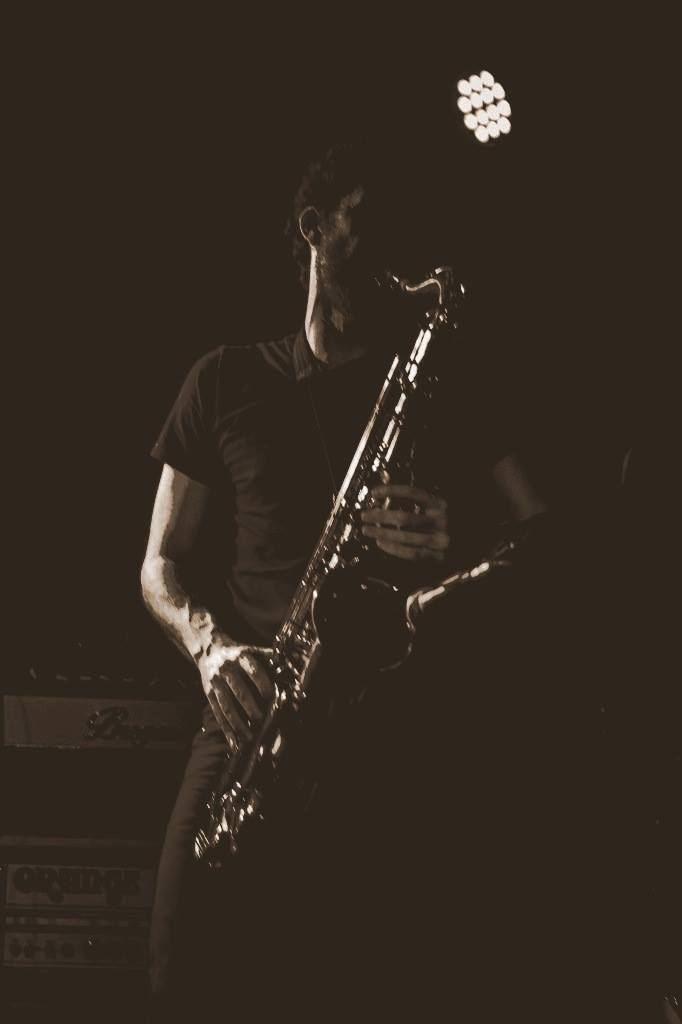
Maus Hábitos, Porto in 2014

In 2011, Fausto (Guitar) joined Ruben Sequeira (Drums) and Flávio SA (Bass) and formed a trio psychedelic rock / stoner with 1970s blues rock influences through the name Gesso. They have a traditional 1970s sound with a compact drums, heavy bass and fuzzy delayed guitar. The first EP Névoa Baixa, Sol Que Racha was released in 2011 and two years later, their debut album Howling Grace.

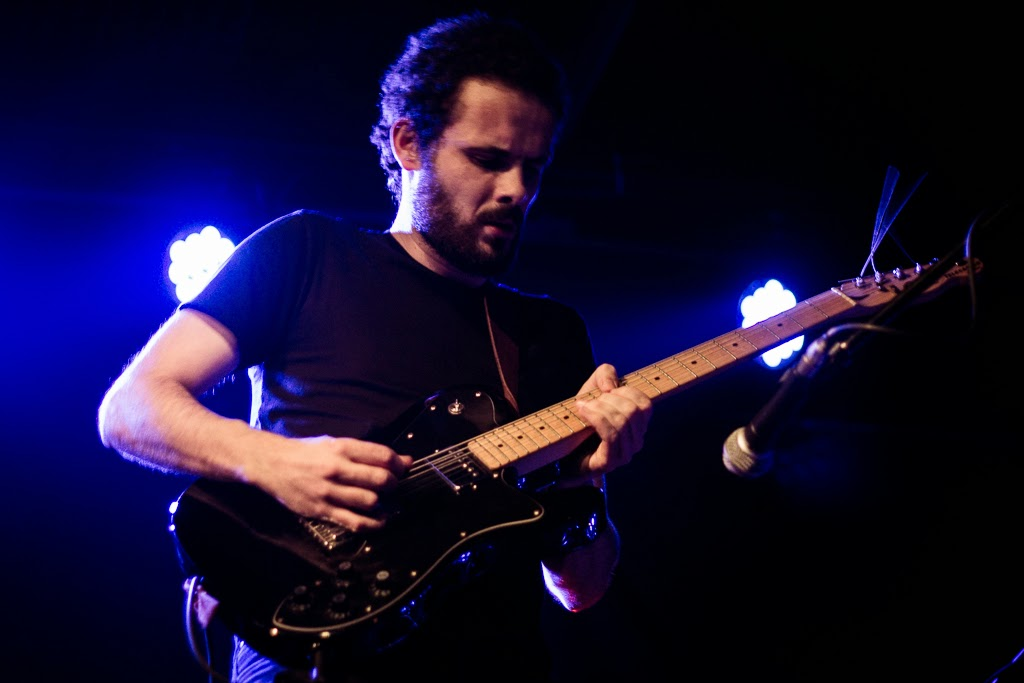
Joel Fausto performing with Gesso in 2014

Lord is this some sweet psychedelia. The in-the-red recording and slightly blown-out production just adds to the insane bad ass shreddery and in your face riffage that threatens to melt it off from the time you hit play, until the final note explodes from the speakers into your decimated eardrums.
The first thing that really caught me about Gesso's debut full-length Howling Grace was the absolutely gnarled, distorted, fuzzy bass that crunched and trundled about, propelling the guitar work and tight drums into the stratosphere. The chest rumbling thunder of four-string sonic assault is aided by tight distorted guitar leads that thread in and out of the songs like a needle in some cosmic fabric of space and time, all interlocked with the perfectly apt drumming, occasional saxophone appearance and enough trippy space sounds to keep you floating out of body and mind the whole time.
There's some pretty great acid jazz and space rock going on here, amidst dead ahead instrumental psych rock and some nice mid-tempo melodies that will have you slow-motion head banging within seconds. Gesso truly is the real deal. — It's Psychedelic Baby! Magazine

== Manos (2015–present) ==
Fausto invited his sister, Andreia Figueiredo (singer and composer), and they formed Manos (brothers), a psychedelic rock and post-punk band influenced by 1980s new wave with hallucination trips. They released an unexpected EP Fui ao Céu e Voltei in 2016 by Slowdriver Productions.

== Discography ==
Studio albums

- 2008 – Meet Me in the Bottom
- 2013 – Illusion Orchestra at the Gloomy Club
- 2016 – Hello
- 2019 – Inside The Throat of a Giant Insect
- 2022 - Deus é Cego!

EPs

- 2009 – Drawn for the End
- 2025 - Blood's a Rover

Compilation albums

- 2015 – Isn't It Too Dreamy : A Twin Peaks compilation inspired by Audrey Horne edited by 'Welcome To Twin Peaks'.
- 2016 – Noir Jazz : Compilation edited by 'Midnight Radio'.

Film soundtracks

- 2015 – Déjà Vécu
- 2016 – Berlin Hustle
- 2019 – Blood's A Rover
- 2024 - 1913

== Others ==
- Omitir
- Forgotten Winter
- Manos
- Gesso
- Cajado
- Larva
