= Gods & Goddesses =

Studio album by Brant Bjork
- Released: March 30, 2010
- Recorded: November 2009
- Genre: Stoner rock; desert rock
- Length: 32:52
- Label: Low Desert Punk; Heavy Psych Sounds Records (2020 reissue)
- Producer: Ethan Allen & Brant Bjork

Brant Bjork chronology
Punk Rock Guilt (2008)	Gods & Goddesses (2010)	Black Power Flower (2014)

Alternative cover
- Heavy Psych Sounds reissue

Professional ratings
Review scores
Source	Rating
AllMusic	3/5 stars
Otago Daily Times	2/5 stars
RockFreaks.net	6.5/10
Sputnikmusic	4/5 stars

Gods & Goddesses is the ninth solo album by desert rock artist Brant Bjork. The album was released on March 30 2010, and features a unique band lineup, including Billy Cordell of Yawning Man.

== Track listing ==
All tracks are written by Brant Bjork

No.	Title	Length
1.	"Dirty Bird"	2:48
2.	"The Future Rock (We Got It)"	3:56
3.	"Radio Mecca"	3:54
4.	"Little World"	5:02
5.	"Blowin' Up Shop"	3:27
6.	"Good Time Bonnie"	3:49
7.	"Porto"	3:50
8.	"Somewhere, Some Woman"	5:49
Total length:		32:52

== Personnel ==
- Brant Bjork – guitar, vocals
- Billy Cordell – bass
- Brandon Henderson – guitar
- Giampaolo Farnedi – drums

=== Credits ===
- Produced by Ethan Allen & Brant Bjork
- Recorded and mixed by Ethan Allen & Jim Watts
- Mastered by Bruce Barielle
- Art direction and design: Cale Bunker
- Photography: Rich Sibbald
- Photo assistant and spiritual advisor: Eric Allward
- Hot chica: Amanda Limon
- Bad ride: Scotty Diablo
- 2010 Dune Boogie Tunez BMI

== Notes ==
- The album was re-released in 2020 with new artwork via Bjork's current label, Heavy Psych Sounds.
