= Once Upon a Time in the Desert =

Studio album by Brant Bjork Trio
- Released: September 20, 2024
- Studio: Donner and Blitzen Studios, Crestline, California
- Genre: Stoner rock; desert rock
- Length: 41:42
- Label: Duna Records
- Producer: Brant Bjork & Mario Lalli

Brant Bjork chronology
Bougainvillea Suite (2022)	Once Upon a Time in the Desert (2024)	Live in the High Desert (2025)

Singles from Once Upon a Time in the Desert
- 1. "Backin' The Daze" Released: June 25, 2024; 2. "Magic Surfer Magazine" Released: September 20, 2024

Professional ratings
Review scores
Source	Rating
Distorted Sound	6/10
New Noise Magazine	5/5 stars
Metal Epidemic	3.5/5 stars
Sputnikmusic	3.7/5 stars

Once Upon a Time in the Desert is the fourteenth solo album by stoner rock musician Brant Bjork. It was released on September 20, 2024, by Duna Records. The album features an all new band lineup with desert rock legend Mario Lalli on bass. This is the first album released on the relaunched Duna Records label after many years on hiatus.

== Track listing ==
All tracks are written by Brant Bjork.

No.	Title	Length
1.	"U.R. Free"	4:47
2.	"Backin' The Daze"	3:42
3.	"Higher Lows"	3:56
4.	"Down The Mountain"	4:20
5.	"Magic Surfer Magazine"	4:18
6.	"Sunshine Is Makin' Love To Your Mind"	6:36
7.	"Rock And Roll In The Dirt"	4:48
8.	"Astrological Blues/Southern California Girl"	4:46
9.	"Do You Got Some Fire?"	4:14
Total length:		41:42

== Personnel ==
- Brant Bjork – vocals, guitar
- Mario Lalli – bass
- Ryan Gut – drums

== Credits ==
- Produced by Brant Bjork and Mario Lalli
- Engineered and Mixed by Mathias Schneeberger
- Recorded at Donner and Blitzen Studios, Crestline, California
- Front cover art by Ricardo Diseno
- Inside photos by Rich Sibbald
- Album art layout by Mario Lalli
