= Soldier of Love =

Soldier of Love or Soldiers of Love may refer to:

- "Soldier of Love" (Donny Osmond song), a 1989 single by Donny Osmond
- Soldier of Love (album), a 2010 album by Sade
  - "Soldier of Love" (Sade song), the lead single by Sade from the album Soldier of Love
- "Soldier of Love (Lay Down Your Arms)", 1962 song originally by Arthur Alexander, covered by The Beatles, Marshall Crenshaw and Pearl Jam
- "Soldier of Love", song by Brant Bjork and the Low Desert Punk Band from their 2014 album Black Power Flower
- "Soldiers of Love" (Feeder song), 2023
- "Soldiers of Love" (Lighthouse X song), 2016
- "Soldiers of Love" (Liliane Saint-Pierre song), 1987

== See also ==
- "Purple Hearts (Soldier of Love)", CeeLo Green song from his 2015 album Heart Blanche
