= The Sonic Dawn =

- Origin: Copenhagen, Denmark
- Genres: Psychedelic rock
- Years active: 2013–present
- Labels: Heavy Psych Sounds, Nasoni Records
- Members: Emil Bureau; Jonas Waaben; Niels 'Bird' Fuglede
- Website: thesonicdawn.com

The Sonic Dawn is a psychedelic rock band, based in Copenhagen, Denmark. They are known as a prolific live act, having toured Europe numerous times. They have released four full-length albums. The Sonic Dawn describe their sound as "a psychedelic mixture of styles, from jazzy sitar pop to heavy acid rock." They have recently appeared alongside artists such as Graveyard and Brant Bjork.

== History ==
The band was formed in Copenhagen by Emil Bureau (guitar, vocals), Jonas Waaben (drums, perc., backing vocals) and Niels Fuglede (bass guitar) in the summer 2013. Initially the group was named The Mind Flowers, which was later changed to The Sonic Dawn, because of legal issues with ownership of the name in the United States.

Following their first concert 9 January 2014, in Copenhagen, the band was signed by the local psychedelia and stoner rock label, Levitation Records (now defunct). The record debut was a 7-inch vinyl split featuring their single Down the Line, released in May 2014. The single aired on national radio in Denmark, but failed to chart. Same year the band toured Denmark, performing with Spids Nøgenhat, label mates The Hedgehogs and more.

In 2015, The Sonic Dawn expanded to Europe, with tour dates in Germany, France, The Netherlands, Norway and Sweden. Via these touring efforts, The Sonic Dawn landed their first international record deal with German Nasoni Records, known for releasing Colour Haze among others, who released Perception on 31 October 2015. Musically, the album can be described as a mix of rock and blues songwriting, with a psychedelic sound. It prominently features the Swedish organist Erik 'Errka' Petersson on keys, a studio collaboration that continued on the group's next album as well. While Perception did not gain the interest of mainstream media, it established The Sonic Dawn as a name in the underground, one such critic speculating that The Sonic Dawn might be "the next big band of the current retro rock wave" (Eclipsed Rock Magazine, March 2016). Nasoni printed two limited editions of the LP on colored vinyl, which are both sold out. A remastered audiophile edition, cut at Abbey Road Studios in London, was released in late 2017.

Upon Perception's release the band toured Europe extensively. One notable performance was their opening of Freak Valley Festival 2016, sharing the stage with Graveyard, Dead Meadow and others.

On 21 April 2017, The Sonic Dawn released their second album, Into the Long Night, on Italian Heavy Psych Sounds, record label of Nick Oliveri (former Queens of the Stone Age) and Nebula. The album was recorded during one month's isolation in a remote house by the North Sea in Denmark. A mini documentary by filmmaker Bolette Søs covers the unusual recording process. The song l'Espion charted on Danish national radio, two weeks as No. 1 on DR P3's music chart, Barometerlisten, remaining in rotation for eight weeks total. Also in Sweden the album got some national airplay, while underground radio shows and podcasts continued their interest in the band's psychedelic sound. On the release date Uffe Lorenzen (Baby Woodrose's front man) opened for The Sonic Dawn with a solo set.

As an album Into the Long Night is more explorative and varied in sound, showing both a more sensitive and jazzy quality, while taking the psychedelic aspect further at the same time, as noted by several critics, with Classic Rock Magazine stating that "Denmark is entering the world market for psychedelic drugs." The album explores a wider instrumentation, notably featuring Danish jazz legend Morten Grønvad on vibraphone and percussion. Upon the release of into the Long Night, The Sonic Dawn played around 60 European shows, including 15 dates with Brant Bjork (formerly of Kyuss and Fu Manchu), who handpicked them as tour support on his Mankind Woman album tour.

On 1 February 2019, The Sonic Dawn's third album, Eclipse, was released on Heavy Psych Sounds Records. Their biggest work to date, with the album's 13 tracks picked among over 40 candidates, according to the group itself. Reviewers called it "one of the best psychedelic pop albums of the decade" and "The Sonic Dawn’s preliminary masterpiece". The album was recorded to tape at The Village Recording in Copenhagen with producer, Thomas Vang, known for his work with Roger Waters. The album singles Forever 1969 and Psychedelic Ranger received moderate national airplay across Europe. The Sonic Dawn toured Europe for five weeks in the spring 2019 and has announced two weeks of fall/winter tour, in support of Eclipse.

== Discography ==
- "Down the Line" b/w "Blue Jay" (7-inch split with The Roaring 420s). Levitation Records, 2014.
- Perception (CD/LP). Nasoni Records, 2015.
- Into the Long Night (CD/LP). Heavy Psych Sounds, 2017.
- Eclipse (CD/LP). Heavy Psych Sounds, 2019.
- Enter the Mirage (CD/LP). Heavy Psych Sounds, 2020.
