= My Soul =

My Soul may refer to:

== Albums ==
- My Soul (Coolio album), 1997
- My Soul (Judy Torres album), or its title track, 1992
- My Soul (Leela James album), 2010
- My Soul, by Makoto

== Songs ==
- "My Soul", a song by Gunna from Drip Season 3
- "My Soul", a song by Johnny Winter on Guitar Slinger
- "My Soul", a song by Brant Bjork from Keep Your Cool
- "My Soul", a song by Lowkey from Soundtrack to the Struggle
- "My Soul", a song by ¥$ from Vultures 2
