= Bougainvillea Suite =

Studio album by Brant Bjork
- Released: October 28, 2022
- Studio: Hacienda, Joshua Tree, California
- Genre: Stoner rock; desert rock
- Length: 41:14
- Label: Heavy Psych Sounds
- Producer: Yosef Sanborn

Brant Bjork chronology
Brant Bjork (2020)	Bougainvillea Suite (2022)	Once Upon a Time in the Desert (2024)

Singles from Bougainvillea Suite
- 1. "Trip on the Wine" Released: July 19, 2022; 2. "Bread for Butter" Released: September 14, 2022

Professional ratings
Review scores
Source	Rating
Distorted Sound	9/10
Ever Metal	8.5/10
Classic Rock	3.5/5 stars
Metal Epidemic	2.5/5 stars
Metal Hammer	3.5/5 stars
The Rocktologist	7/10

Bougainvillea Suite is the thirteenth solo album by stoner rock musician Brant Bjork. It was released on October 28, 2022, by Heavy Psych Sounds Records. The album features a much more laid back relaxed sound from previous offerings. This is the last album recorded at his Joshua Tree home studio.

== Track listing ==
All tracks are written by Brant Bjork except track 8.

No.	Title	Writer(s)	Length
1.	"Trip on the Wine"		3:19
2.	"Good Bones"		5:26
3.	"So They Say"		4:24
4.	"Broke That Spell"		6:48
5.	"Bread for Butter"		4:09
6.	"Ya' Dig"		3:49
7.	"Let's Forget"		4:25
8.	"Who Do You Love?"	Bo Diddley	8:54
Total length:			41:14

== Personnel ==
- Brant Bjork – vocals, guitar, bass, drums & percussion
- Ryan Gut – keys, percussion
- Nick Oliveri – guitar lead & backing vocals on "Bread for Butter"
