= Waxy (band) =

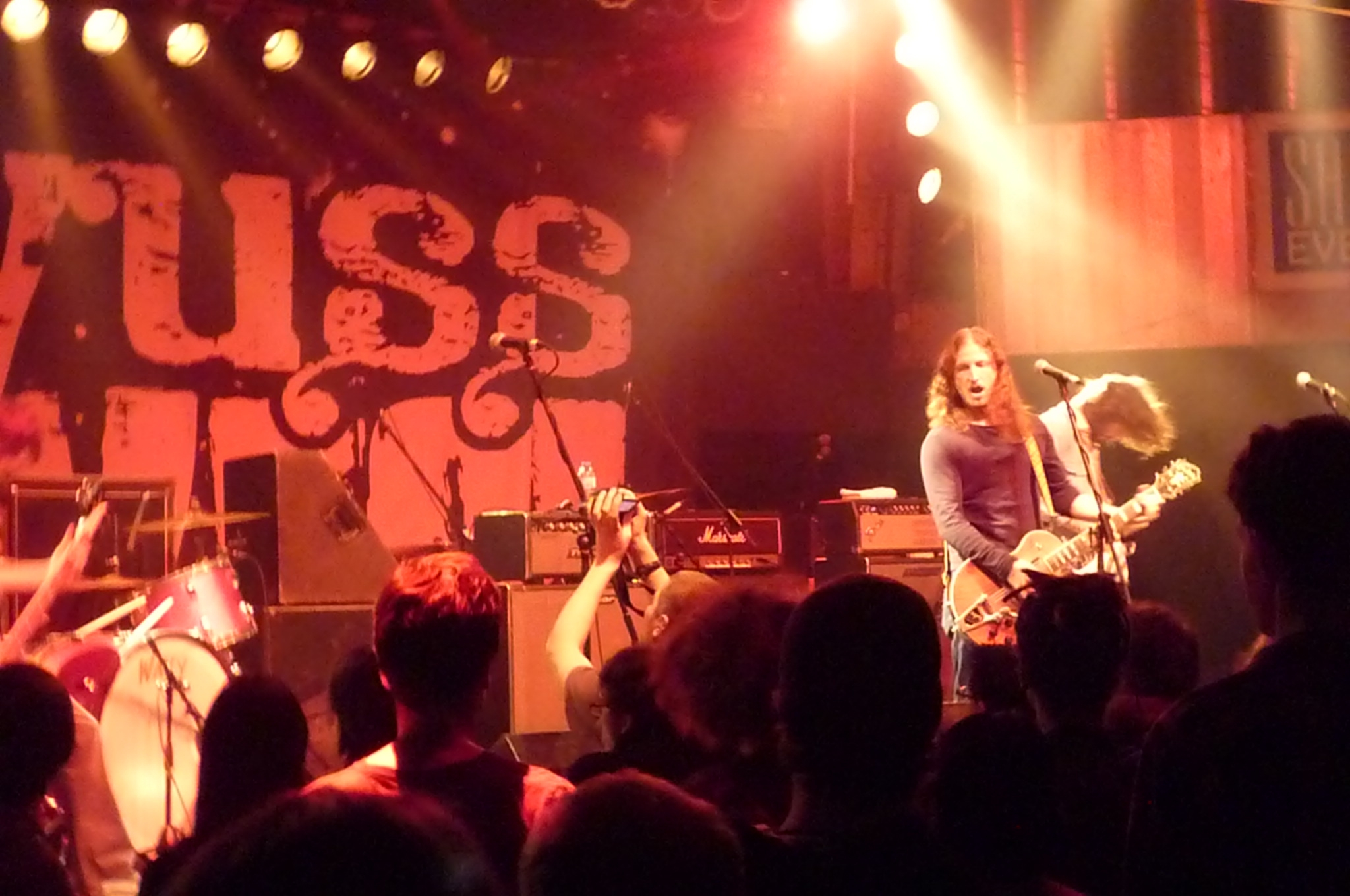
- Waxy live at the Garage Saarbrücken

Background information
- Origin: California, United States
- Genres: Stoner rock; desert rock
- Label: Bowlleg Records
- Members: Robbie Waldman; Jeff Bowman; Robert Bowman; Tyler Ontiveros
- Past members: Charles Pasarell; Brett Stadler; Owen Street; Sean Landerra; Jack Kohler; Ehren Groban Damian Lautiero Robbie Waldman
- Website: www.waxymusic.net

Waxy is an American stoner rock band from the Desert of Southern California (Palm Springs / Palm Desert / Indio), and is part of the Palm Desert Scene. The power trio consists of frontman Robbie Waldman (guitar/vocals), Tyler Ontiveros (drums) and Robert Bowman (bass). Brett Stadler, long time personal friend of Waldman, is the band's eccentric co-lyricyst as well as a published poet. WAXY's sound is a cross between Black Sabbath and Thin Lizzy with a healthy dose of Tom Waits. Heavy, sexy and sincere best describe the vibe. Some people describe them as Desert Rock...Europeans call it Stoner Rock.

Following their 2005 self-titled debut, 2007 saw the release of their second effort Chainsaw Holiday.

Things really got going with the release of their album Without Any eXplanation whY.'

Since then WAXY hooked up with Cobraside for their distribution and have been touring ever since.

WAXY's latest album titles 'Betting on Forgetting'.
