= Stöner =

American rock band

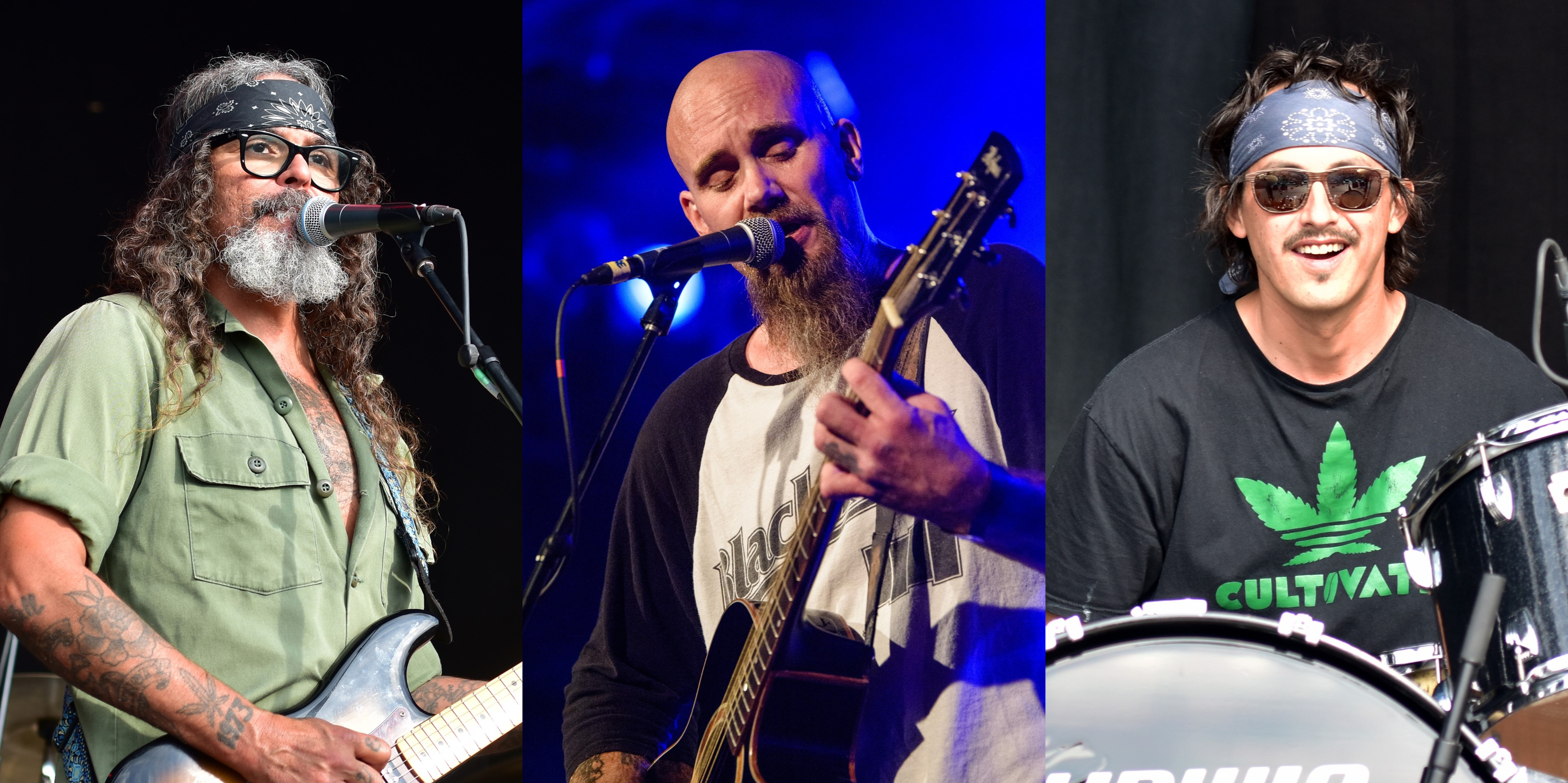
- The Stöner lineup, from left to right: Brant Bjork, Nick Oliveri and Ryan Güt.

Background information
- Origin: California, U.S.
- Genres: Stoner rock; desert rock; psychedelic rock; punk rock; metal; blues rock; hard rock
- Years active: 2020–present
- Label: Heavy Psych Sounds
- Spinoffs: Mario Lalli & the Rubber Snake Charmers; Brant Bjork Trio
- Spinoff of: Kyuss; Mondo Generator; Vista Chino; Brant Bjork and the Low Desert Punk Band
- Members: Brant Bjork; Nick Oliveri; Ryan Güt
- Website: stonerbandofficial.com

Stöner is an American rock band formed in 2020 by former Kyuss members Brant Bjork and Nick Oliveri, and Bjork's solo band drummer, Ryan Güt. The power trio has released two studio albums and toured extensively in support of both albums.

== History ==
=== Formation and Stoners Rule (2020–2021) ===
Stöner was formed in 2020, first appearing on bassist Nick Oliveri's solo compilation album N.O. Hits at All Vol.666. Guitarist Brant Bjork stated that Oliveri founded the band name while playing music together with him and Ryan Güt. In October 2020, the band made their live debut by performing on the fourth volume of the Live in the Mojave Desert concert film series produced and recorded by Giant Rock Records. The live album was also mixed and released separately by the band's label Heavy Psych Sounds Records. In June 2021, Stöner released their debut studio album, Stoners Rule. The album received mostly positive reviews from critics, with Kerrang! giving the album a 4 out of 5 rating, stating, "If you are any kind of stoner rock fan, Stöner are a very familiar hit." Games, Brrraaains & a Head-Banging Life rated the album an 8.5/10 and wrote, "STÖNER proving that the threesome has incredible chemistry and are able to stand out amongst each individual's other musical work." The band embarked on a full U.S. tour in support of the album and as a supporting act for fellow stoner rock band Clutch.

=== Totally... and Boogie to Baja (2022–present) ===
In 2022, the trio embarked on their West North West Tour and Interstellar Taco Tour alongside desert rock neighbors Yawning Man ahead of the May 6 release of their sophomore album, Totally.... During select dates of the tours, 2/3 of Yawning Man weren't able to perform due to COVID-19 related issues. Among those dates, Yawning Man bassist Mario Lalli, who is also the touring manager for Stöner, and his improvisational act dubbed the 'Rubber Snake Charmers' featured the lineup of Oliveri on vocals, Lalli on bass, and Bjork and Güt on their respective instruments. Come the album's release, it received positive reviews with some critics calling it an improvement over the debut album. Rock Sins gave the album a 9 out of 10 overall score, declaring, "Totally… treads the line between giving stoner rock fans those essential big puthering riffs and grooves while adding a little stamp of personality and fun to proceedings." Louder Sound gave it a verdict of 3.5/5 with the headline, "Stöner's new album is a consummate lesson in High Desert grooviness." The band arranged numerous tour dates throughout Europe, the U.S., Australia and New Zealand to promote the album while being accompanied by various supporting acts including Norwegian desert rock outfit Slomosa and the Rubber Snake Charmers featuring Sean Wheeler of Throw Rag.

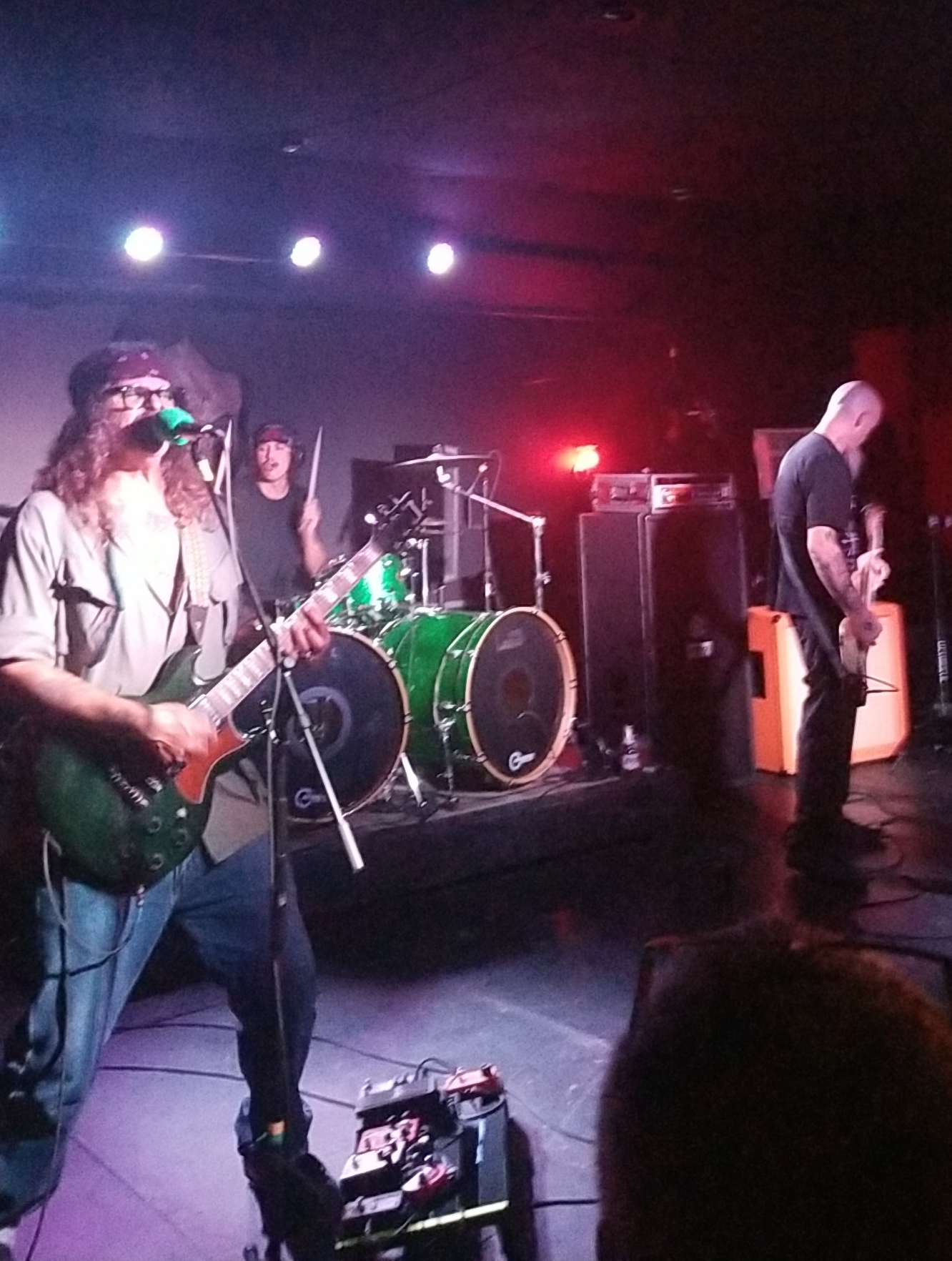
Stöner live in 2022

In June, 2022, Oliveri revealed that a record titled Boogie to Baja had been recorded during the Totally... sessions and would be released the following year. The EP was released in February 2023 to praise from critics. Distorted Sound gave Boogie to Baja an 8/10, with the closing statement, "So, if you’re in need of some time to sit back and space out with some fuzz-laden desert riffs and trippy guitar melodies, this EP is for you." Soundmagnet also gave the release an 8/10 and wrote in its conclusion, "The excursions into the musical surroundings make the five tracks very entertaining, whereby the traditionalists also get enough desert sand in their ears."

== Musical style and influences ==
In an interview with Outlaws of the Sun, Brant Bjork said about the band's musical style:

"We all put our musical influences into this via original jam sessions. This feels like a mixture of punk rock, metal, blues rock and hard rock. Some stuff we're already known for and some stuff that will surprise and hopefully entertain people."

Games, Brrraaains, & a Head-Banging Life described the music in their review of Stoners Rule, "You'll also be well aware of just how good STÖNER's brand of psych, stoner, proto rock and retro noise is. Stuff that is super chilled, fuzzy and psychedelia but super groovy too." When speaking to Decibel about the inspiration of the band along with the influences on the album Totally..., Bjork explained how it dated back to when him and Oliveri were growing up in their youth together:

"Those bands we loved and shared with each other when we were young, those are our influences. Ramones and The Damned and Black Flag and Motörhead and AC/DC and all that shit."

Stöner's bio on the band's website also lists Blue Öyster Cult, Kiss, Blue Cheer, the Misfits, the Stooges, and MC5 among the band's inspirations.

== Controversy ==
In June 2021, Brant Bjork announced that Stöner and Mario Lalli of Yawning Man had completely distanced themselves from Bjork's former personal manager, Ryan Jones of Giant Rock Records, along with any other record labels and/or venues Jones is associated with. Bjork added that all trademarks, site domains and revenue were already in dispute at the time. Further tensions arose with the digital release of the Live in the Mojave Desert: Volume 4 album by Giant Rock Records when Stöner announced on social media that the band "does not endorse or recognize" the Giant Rock versions of the album and that they are considered bootleg copies. Giant Rock claims Stöner's stance on the issue stems from the trademark dispute and that the album rights were also licensed to the band's label Heavy Psych Sounds Records. According to its website, the production of the Live in the Mojave Desert film series is solely accredited to Giant Rock. Additionally and prior to the dispute, Bjork had stated in an interview that Jones conceptualized the idea for Live in the Mojave Desert as a stand-in for the concert festival Stoned and Dusted, which Bjork and Lalli have performed for annually, as well as the initial planning for the release of the concert as a video stream, vinyl pressing and digital download.

== Band members ==
- Brant Bjork – guitar, vocals (2020–present)
- Nick Oliveri – bass, vocals (2020–present)
- Ryan Güt – drums, percussion (2020–present)

== Discography ==
=== Studio albums ===
- Stoners Rule (2021, Heavy Psych Sounds Records)
  | No. | Title | Length |
  |---|---|---|
  | 1. | "Rad Stays Rad" | 6:27 |
  | 2. | "The Older Kids" | 5:09 |
  | 3. | "Own Yer Blues" | 6:00 |
  | 4. | "Nothin'" | 2:37 |
  | 5. | "Evel Never Dies" | 2:51 |
  | 6. | "Stand Down" | 6:19 |
  | 7. | "Tribe / Fly Girl" | 13:19 |
  | Total length: | | 42:42 |
- Totally... (2022, Heavy Psych Sounds Records)
  | No. | Title | Length |
  |---|---|---|
  | 1. | "Party March" | 3:52 |
  | 2. | "A Million Beers" | 2:43 |
  | 3. | "Strawberry Creek (Dirty Feet)" | 3:46 |
  | 4. | "Spacedude & The Burn" | 8:11 |
  | 5. | "Stöner Theme" | 2:36 |
  | 6. | "Turn It Around Now" | 5:03 |
  | 7. | "Driving Miss Lazy" | 4:07 |
  | 8. | "Great American Sage" | 7:07 |
  | Total length: | | 37:25 |

=== EPs ===
- Boogie to Baja (2023, Heavy Psych Sounds Records)
  | No. | Title | Length |
  |---|---|---|
  | 1. | "Stöner Theme (Baja Version)" | 2:41 |
  | 2. | "City Kids" | 3:39 |
  | 3. | "Night Tripper vs. No Brainer" | 7:31 |
  | 4. | "It Ain't Free" | 2:31 |
  | 5. | "Boogie to Baja" | 10:07 |
  | Total length: | | 26:29 |

=== Live albums ===
- Live in the Mojave Desert: Volume 4 (2021, Heavy Psych Sounds Records)
  | No. | Title | Length |
  |---|---|---|
  | 1. | "Rad Stays Rad" | 6:37 |
  | 2. | "Nothin'" | 2:40 |
  | 3. | "Own Yer Blues" | 6:28 |
  | 4. | "The Older Kids" | 5:26 |
  | 5. | "Stand Down" | 6:49 |
  | 6. | "Evel Never Dies" | 2:51 |
  | 7. | "Tribe / Fly Girl" | 15:16 |
  | Total length: | | 46:07 |

Notes

- The Giant Rock Records release of Live in the Mojave Desert: Volume 4 has a slightly different track listing and separates "Tribe / Fly Girl" into two tracks.

=== Singles ===
- "Nothin'" (2021, Heavy Psych Sounds Records)
- "Rad Stays Rad" (2021, Heavy Psych Sounds Records)
- "A Million Beers" (2022, Heavy Psych Sounds Records)
- "Party March" (2022, Heavy Psych Sounds Records)
- "Strawberry Creek (Dirty Feet)" (2022, Heavy Psych Sounds Records)
- "City Kids" (2022, Heavy Psych Sounds Records)
- "It Ain't Free" (2022, Heavy Psych Sounds Records)
- "Night Tripper vs. No Brainer" (2023, Heavy Psych Sounds Records)

== Tours ==
2021

- 30 Years of Rock & Roll Tour (with Clutch)

2022

- Interstellar Taco Tour (with Yawning Man)
- West North West Tour (with Yawning Man)
- U.K./Ireland Tour (with Slomosa, Patrón, New Secret Weapon)
- Europe Tour (with Slomosa, Mario Lalli & the Rubber Snake Charmers)
- East Coast/South West Tour (with Mario Lalli & the Rubber Snake Charmers)
- Australia & New Zealand Tour (with Mario Lalli & the Rubber Snake Charmers)
