= Mankind Woman =

Studio album by Brant Bjork
- Released: September 14, 2018
- Studios: Zainaland, Twentynine Palms, California
- Genres: Stoner rock; desert rock; psychedelic rock
- Length: 38:49
- Label: Heavy Psych Sounds
- Producer: Bubba Dupree

Brant Bjork chronology
Europe '16 (2017)	Mankind Woman (2018)	Jacoozzi (2019)

Singles from Mankind Woman
- 1. "Chocolatize" Released: July 3, 2018; 2. "Swagger & Sway" Released: August 20, 2018; 3. "Charlie Gin" Released: August 31, 2018

Mankind Woman is the thirteenth solo album by stoner rock musician Brant Bjork. It was released on September 14, 2018, by Heavy Psych Sounds Records.

The album is notable for its primary songwriting collaboration with Low Desert Punk Band guitarist Bubba Dupree. A music video was made for the lead single "Chocolatize".

== Reception ==
Professional ratings
Review scores
Source	Rating
Ghost Cult	7/10
KNAC	3.5/5 stars
Metal Hammer	3/5 stars
Metal Rules	3/5 stars
Metal Temple	8/10
MyGlobalMind	9/10
QRO	8.5/10
Sputnikmusic	3.5/5 stars

Reviews for Mankind Woman were mostly positive. Critics pointed out similarities with 1960s–70s rock influences including Jimi Hendrix, Cream and Led Zeppelin. 50ThirdAnd3rd praised the album, stating that, "With Mankind Woman, everything Brant Bjork has mastered throughout his career comes together in one cohesive album, celebrating who he is as an artist", while drawing comparisons to Hendrix, Deep Purple and Funkadelic. Some noted the more psychedelic and political tracks off the album including "Nation of Indica" and "Somebody". QRO explained how the sound of the album is more relaxed compared to the previous bands Bjork has been a member of. Metal Rules called the album "a very easy listening tome of Stoner and Desert music".

About the sound and inspiration of Mankind Woman, The Desert Sun noted that "The album actually reveals the Grateful Dead-Black Sabbath roots of Kyuss. "Charlie Gin" has a guitar sound like the 1968 Dead. He titled one song "1968" because the year fascinates Bjork, but it has that deep, sludgy guitar sound of Kyuss."

== Track listing ==
All tracks are written by Brant Bjork, except where noted. All music by Bjork and Bubba Dupree. Lead vocals by Bjork, except where noted

No.	Title	Lyrics	Lead vocals	Length
1.	"Chocolatize"			2:34
2.	"Lazy Wizards"			2:56
3.	"Pisces"			3:53
4.	"Charlie Gin"			2:11
5.	"Mankind Woman"			4:31
6.	"Swagger & Sway"			4:02
7.	"Somebody"	Dupree	Dupree	4:43
8.	"Pretty Hairy"	Sean Wheeler	Wheeler	3:53
9.	"Brand New Old Times"			2:04
10.	"1968"			3:14
11.	"Nation of Indica"	Bjork, Wheeler	Wheeler	4:48
Total length:				38:49

== Personnel ==
Credits adapted from the album's liner notes.

- Brant Bjork – vocals, guitar, bass, drums
- Bubba Dupree – vocals, guitar, bass, percussion
- Sean Wheeler – vocals

Additional musicians

- Armand Sabal-Lecco – bass guitar on "Chocolatize"
- Nick Oliveri – additional backing vocals on "Chocolatize"
