= Brant Bjork & the Operators =

Studio album by Brant Bjork
- Released: April 30, 2002
- Recorded: November 2000
- Studios: Donner & Blitzen Studios, Silverlake, California
- Genres: Stoner rock; desert rock
- Length: 45:40
- Labels: Music Cartel; Duna; Low Desert Punk (Double LP reissue); Heavy Psych Sounds (2022 reissue)
- Producer: Mathias Schneeberger

Brant Bjork chronology
Jalamanta (1999)	Brant Bjork & the Operators (2002)	Keep Your Cool (2003)

Alternative cover
- Heavy Psych Sounds reissue

Brant Bjork & the Operators is the second solo album by desert rocker Brant Bjork. Although titled Brant Bjork and the Operators, Bjork sings and plays most instruments on the album. He is joined by friends Mathias Schneeberger and Mario Lalli to lend guitar and vocals. The album was Duna Records' first release.

This album was reissued on vinyl in 2008 as a double LP by Bjork's Low Desert Punk label, and again in 2022 by Bjork's current label, Heavy Psych Sounds Records.

== Track listing ==
All tracks are written by Brant Bjork

No.	Title	Length
1.	"Hinda65"	5:05
2.	"Smarty Pants"	4:02
3.	"My Ghettoblaster"	4:48
4.	"Electric Lalli Land"	5:11
5.	"From the Ground Up (We Just Stay the Same)"	3:41
6.	"Cheap Wine"	4:09
7.	"Cocoa Butter"	3:13
8.	"Joey's Radio"	4:01
9.	"Captain Lovestar"	6:33
10.	"Hinda65 (Return Flight)"	4:57
Total length:		45:40

== Reception ==
Professional ratings
Review scores
Source	Rating
AllMusic	3/5 stars
RTÉ	3/5 stars

Reviews were mostly positive, with AllMusic declaring "all of the above experiments come off so effortlessly original and organic that despite occasional misfires [...] one has to tip his or her hat to Bjork's purely musical instincts." Exclaim! appreciated the quieter and varied nature of the album, as well as promoting it as a "gem that makes the hours wading through musical sewage worth it".

== Personnel ==
Credits adapted from the album's liner notes.

- Brant Bjork – guitar, vocals, bass, drums
- Mathias Schneeberger – Fender Rhodes, bass on "Smarty Pants"
- Mario Lalli – guitar lead on "Electric Lalli Land"
- Debbie Levitt – backing vocals on "Captain Lovestar"
- Franz Stahl – backing vocals on "Captain Lovestar"
- Low Desert Punks – handclaps

== Notes ==
- "My Ghettoblaster" is Bjork's first single to have a music video.
- "Electric Lalli Land" is a reference to Jimi Hendrix's album Electric Ladyland. The song features Mario Lalli on guitar.
