= Big Scenic Nowhere =

American rock supergroup

- Origin: California, U.S.
- Genres: Stoner rock; desert rock; psychedelic rock
- Years active: 2009–2012, 2019–present
- Labels: Blues Funeral; Satin; Heavy Psych Sounds
- Spinoff of: Yawning Man; Yawning Balch; Fatso Jetson; Fu Manchu; Mos Generator; WaterWays; Ten East
- Members: Gary Arce; Bob Balch; Bill Stinson; Tony Reed

Big Scenic Nowhere is an American rock supergroup from California.

== History ==
=== Demo album (2009–2012) ===
Big Scenic Nowhere dates back to 2009 when demo recordings of the one-off project were recorded and released under the moniker; some being instrumental versions of songs that were eventually recorded and released by Gary Arce of Yawning Man's additional side project WaterWays, and others being early variations of songs that appeared on the Yawning Man album, Nomadic Pursuits. Through 2012, this short-lived act performed live at concerts with lineups including Arce, Mario Lalli, Tony Tornay and Billy Cordell. John Garcia would guest vocals, notably on the Kyuss-covered Yawning Man song, "Catamaran".

=== Studio releases (2019–present) ===
Big Scenic Nowhere was revived as an official band in 2019 by Arce along with Bob Balch of Fu Manchu. The duo released their debut EP, Dying on the Mountain, the same year with guest appearances from Nick Oliveri of Mondo Generator, Lalli and Bill Stinson of Yawning Man, Tony Reed of Mos Generator, Per Wiberg of Spiritual Beggars, Lisa Alley and Ian Graham of The Well, and Thomas V. Jäger of Monolord.

Following the band's full-length debut album, Vision Beyond Horizon in January 2020, Reed and Stinson joined as full-time members. The album featured several collaborating artists including Alain Johannes. The group then released their second EP, Lavender Blues on October 23, 2020, notably produced by Chris Goss of Masters of Reality. Guest musicians included Wiberg and Daniel Mongrain of Voivod.

In January 2022, the band released their sophomore album, The Long Morrow, on Heavy Psych Sounds Records. The album consists of recorded material taken from Lavender Blues as well as unused material written around the time of the EP's release. It featured guest appearances from Wiberg, who has since appeared on every release, and Reeves Gabrels of The Cure.

In early 2023, the band teased a new album set to be released later in the year while showcasing their cover of the song "Sara Smile" with former Hall & Oates keyboardist Eliot Lewis. In November, the album, titled The Waydown, was revealed and features contributions from guest musicians including Wiberg, Gabrels and Gar from Red Barn Studios. It will be released in February 2024.

Released on December 6, 2024 the band contributed a cover of the Jethro Tull song "My God" from the 1971 release, Aqualung to the album Aqualung Redux released through Magnetic Eye Records. In review of the album by Blabbermouth.net the band's song was referred to as "an incendiary, garage doom delight." A song with the lyrical theme, as described by Rolling Stone writer Ben Gerson as dealing with hypocrisy in religion including "how people manipulate notions of God for their own ends" was an example of the album's "brilliant structural organization." The music is set to an "accusatory tone" with a constantly "moving musical theme" and parts that "suggests the influence of Beethoven." An example was cited with the lyrics, "So lean upon him gently and don't call on him to save" which leads into a Sturm und Drang explosion from the band.

== Band members ==
=== Current lineup ===
- Gary Arce – guitar (2009–2012, 2019–present)
- Bob Balch – guitar (2019–present)
- Tony Reed – bass, vocals, synth, guitar (2020–present)
- Bill Stinson – drums (2020–present)

=== Former touring members ===
- Mario Lalli – bass (select dates between 2009–2012)
- Tony Tornay – drums (select dates between 2009–2012)
- Billy Cordell – bass (select dates between 2010–2012)
- Greg Saenz – drums (select dates between 2010–2012)

=== Past collaborators ===
- Mario Lalli (2019)
- Nick Oliveri (2019–2020)
- Per Wiberg (2019–2024)
- Tony Reed (2019–2020)
- Bill Stinson (2019–2020)
- Lisa Alley (2019–2020)
- Ian Graham (2019–2020)
- Thomas V. Jäger (2019–2020)
- Jim Monroe (2019–2020)
- Alain Johannes (2020)
- Chris Goss (2020)
- Daniel Mongrain (2020)
- Reeves Gabrels (2022, 2024)
- Gar (Red Barn Studios) (2024)

== Discography ==
=== Studio albums ===
- Vision Beyond Horizon (2020, Satin / Heavy Psych Sounds)
  No.	Title	Length
  1.	"The Glim"	5:04
  2.	"The Paranoid"	1:35
  3.	"Then I Was Gone"	3:46
  4.	"Mirror Image"	5:41
  5.	"Hidden Wall"	6:55
  6.	"Shadows from the Altar"	4:24
  7.	"En Las Sombras"	6:37
  8.	"Tragic Motion Lines"	5:51
  9.	"War Years"	4:11
- The Long Morrow (2022, Heavy Psych Sounds)
  No.	Title	Length
  1.	"Defector (of Future Days)"	4:19
  2.	"Murder Klipp"	4:47
  3.	"Lavender Bleu"	5:12
  4.	"LeDü"	2:51
  5.	"The Long Morrow"	19:45
- The Waydown (2024, Heavy Psych Sounds)
  No.	Title	Writer(s)	Length
  1.	"The Waydown"		7:41
  2.	"Summer Teeth"
  3.	"Surf Western"
  4.	"Bleed On"
  5.	"Sara Smile"	Hall & Oates
  6.	"BT-OH"
  7.	"100"

=== EPs ===
- Dying on the Mountain (2019, Blues Funeral)
  No.	Title	Length
  1.	"Dying on the Mountain / Altered Ages / Dying on the Mountain (Part 2)"	20:12
  2.	"Towards the Sun"	5:16
- Lavender Blues (2020, Satin / Heavy Psych Sounds)
  No.	Title	Length
  1.	"Lavender Blues"	13:10
  2.	"Blink of an Eye"	4:18
  3.	"Labyrinths Fade"	6:34

=== Other appearances ===
- Aqualung Redux (2024, Magnetic Eye)
  No.	Title	Writer(s)	Length
  7.	"My God"	Jethro Tull	6:00
