= Black Power Flower =

Studio album by Brant Bjork and the Low Desert Punk Band
- Released: November 14, 2014
- Studio: Jalamanta Studios, Joshua Tree, California
- Genre: Stoner rock; desert rock
- Length: 49:15
- Label: Napalm
- Producer: Brant Bjork

Brant Bjork chronology
Gods & Goddesses (2010)	Black Power Flower (2014)	Tao of the Devil (2016)

Professional ratings
Review scores
Source	Rating
Metal Hammer	3/5 stars
The Rockpit	4/5 stars
Metal Blast	3.5/5 stars
Sputnikmusic	4/5 stars

Black Power Flower is the tenth solo album by stoner rock musician Brant Bjork. It was released on November 14 2014, and is his first album credited to his solo band, the Low Desert Punk Band, and his first solo album released on the Napalm Records label.

Music videos were made for the songs "Boogie Woogie on Your Brain" and "Controllers Destroyed".

== Track listing ==
All tracks are written by Brant Bjork.

No.	Title	Length
1.	"Controllers Destroyed"	5:10
2.	"We Don't Serve Their Kind"	4:13
3.	"Stokely Up Now"	5:04
4.	"Buddha Time (Everything Fine)"	3:21
5.	"Soldier of Love"	5:40
6.	"Boogie Woogie on Your Brain"	3:25
7.	"Ain't No Runnin'"	2:58
8.	"That's a Fact, Jack"	5:17
9.	"Hustler's Blues"	5:55
10.	"Where You From, Man"	8:12
Total length:		49:15

== Personnel ==
- Brant Bjork – vocals, guitar
- Bubba Dupree – guitar
- Dave Dinsmore – bass
- Tony Tornay – drums

== Credits ==
- Artwork design by Alexander von Wieding
- Mastered by Gene Grimaldi
- Recorded by Harper Hug & Trevor Whatever
- Mixed by Brant Bjork, Harper Hug & Trevor Whatever
