= Saved by Magic =

Studio album by Brant Bjork and the Bros
- Released: August 1, 2005
- Studio: Rancho de la Luna, Joshua Tree, California
- Genre: Stoner rock; desert rock
- Length: 1:28:32
- Label: Duna Records; Heavy Psych Sounds (2023 re-release)

Brant Bjork and the Bros chronology
Saved by Magic (2005)	Somera Sól (2007)

Brant Bjork chronology
Local Angel (2004)	Saved by Magic (2005)	Tres Dias (2007)

2023 re-release cover
- Brant Bjork – Saved by Magic Again

2023 re-release cover
- Brant Bjork & the Bros – Saved by Magic Again

Professional ratings
Review scores
Source	Rating
AllMusic	4/5 stars
Lords of Metal	77/100
The Metal Forge	7/10

Saved by Magic is the debut double LP released by stoner rock band Brant Bjork and the Bros, and the fifth solo album by Brant Bjork. The album was released on August 1, 2005, by Bjork's personal label, Duna Records.

In September 2023, the album was re-released by Heavy Psych Sounds Records as two separate albums under the new title, Saved by Magic Again. The albums feature track listings consisting of the songs recorded by Bjork himself and the songs recorded with the Bros, respectively. Both albums were remastered by John McBain.

== Track listings ==
Original CD release

Fuckin' A
No.	Title	Length
1.	"Magic vs. Technology"	2:03
2.	"Get Into It"	5:47
3.	"Kiss Away"	5:34
4.	"'73"	3:50
5.	"Lil' Bro"	3:15
6.	"Moda"	5:19
7.	"Dr. Aura"	3:08
8.	"Gonna Make the Pony Trot"	3:40
9.	"Sweet Maria's Dreams"	4:48
10.	"Inside of You"	3:24

Fuckin' Be
No.	Title	Length
11.	"Freak Levels"	6:17
12.	"Let the Truth Be Known"	2:23
13.	"Dylan's Fantasy"	2:31
14.	"Messengers"	4:50
15.	"Paradise on Earth"	5:30
16.	"Cool Abdul"	4:50
17.	"Avenida de la Revolución"	4:41
18.	"Sunshine of Your Love"	6:33
19.	"Arcade Eyes"(ends at 5:05) "2000 Man" (hidden track, starts at 7:05)	10:09

Original LP release

Fuckin' A
No.	Title	Length
1.	"Magic vs. Technology"	2:03
2.	"Get Into It"	5:47
3.	"Kiss Away"	5:34
4.	"'73"	3:50
5.	"Lil' Bro"	3:15

Fuckin' Be
No.	Title	Length
6.	"Moda"	5:19
7.	"Dr. Aura"	3:08
8.	"Gonna Make the Pony Trot"	3:40
9.	"Sweet Maria's Dreams"	4:48
10.	"Inside of You"	3:24

Fuckin' See?
No.	Title	Length
11.	"Freak Levels"	6:17
12.	"Let the Truth Be Known"	2:23
13.	"Dylan's Fantasy"	2:31
14.	"Messengers"	4:50
15.	"Paradise on Earth"	5:30

Fuckin' Dee Dee
No.	Title	Length
16.	"Cool Abdul"	4:50
17.	"Avenida de la Revolución"	4:41
18.	"Sunshine of Your Love"	6:33
19.	"Arcade Eyes"(ends at 5:05) "2000 Man" (hidden track, starts at 7:05)	10:09

== Personnel ==
The Bros

- Brant Bjork – guitar, vocals
- Dylan Roche – bass
- Scott "Cortez" Silverman – guitar
- Michael Peffer – drums, percussion

== Credits ==
Additional Guitars on "Sweet Maria's Dreams" & "Avenida de la Revolución" by Mario Lalli

Produced by The Older Kids

Recorded at Rancho de la Luna, Joshua Tree, CA

Engineered by Tony Mason

Mixed by Tony Mason & Brant Bjork

Mastered by Brian "Big Bass" Gardner

All songs by Brant Bjork and the Bros (Dune Boogie Tunez BMI & 3BSound BMI) Except "Sunshine of Your Love" by Cream and "2000 Man" by The Rolling Stones

Album Illustration by Adamstab

Colorized by Chris Henry with Adamstab

Duna Art direction and layout by Cale Bunker & SweetnLow

Management and booking by Denise DiVitto

== Notes ==
- The vinyl release is separated into four tracks, "Fuckin' A, Fuckin' Be, Fuckin' See?, Fuckin' Dee Dee", with the first three tracks containing five songs, and the last track containing four songs.
- Brant Bjork covers the Cream hit "Sunshine of Your Love". The song is absent from the digital versions.
- At the end of "Avenida de la Revolución", (Cream's "SWLABR") can be heard playing on the background.
- At the end of "Arcade Eyes" is a cover of the song "2000 Man" by The Rolling Stones.
