= Local Angel =

Studio album by Brant Bjork
- Released: August 10, 2004
- Recorded: February 6, 2004–February 15, 2004
- Studio: Rancho de la Luna, Joshua Tree, California
- Genre: Stoner rock; desert rock
- Length: 47:37
- Label: Duna Records; Heavy Psych Sounds Records (2018 reissue)
- Producer: Brant Bjork & Tony Mason

Brant Bjork chronology
Keep Your Cool (2003)	Local Angel (2004)	Saved by Magic (2005)

Alternative cover
- Heavy Psych Sounds reissue

Professional ratings
Review scores
Source	Rating
AllMusic	3.5/5 stars
Sputnikmusic	3.5/5 stars

Local Angel is the fourth solo album by desert rock musician Brant Bjork. It is considered his most intimate and laid back record, mixing acoustic guitars and simple melodies.

== Track listing ==
All tracks are written by Brant Bjork, except tracks 11 & 12

No.	Title	Length
1.	"Beautiful Powers"	3:25
2.	"Hippie"	5:35
3.	"Chico"	3:51
4.	"The Feelin'"	4:38
5.	"Bliss Ave."	4:35
6.	"Fly to Haiti"	3:15
7.	"You're Alright"	3:36
8.	"Spanish Tiles"	2:13
9.	"She's Only Tryin'"	4:30
10.	"The Good Fight"	4:14
11.	"Hey Joe"	5:49
12.	"I Want You Around" (Ramones cover)	1:56
Total length:		47:37

== Credits ==
- Produced by Brant Bjork and Tony Mason
- Engineered by Tony Mason
- Mastered by Mathias Schneeberger
- Front cover angel by www.mistercartoon.com
- Layout Bunker/Bjork for Dunart

== Notes ==
- Local Angel CD releases feature two cover bonus tracks by Billy Roberts and the Ramones. The vinyl and digital versions don't feature either of these songs.
- The initial material for the album was originally recorded on a cassette tape by Bjork in 2001. Bjork then recorded the material at Rancho De La Luna in 2003 with Molly McGuire and Dave Catching, before ultimately shelving the group's tapes and re-recording the album himself which would become the released version.
- The album was re-released in 2018 with new artwork under Bjork's current label, Heavy Psych Sounds.
