= Brant Bjork =

American musician (born 1973)

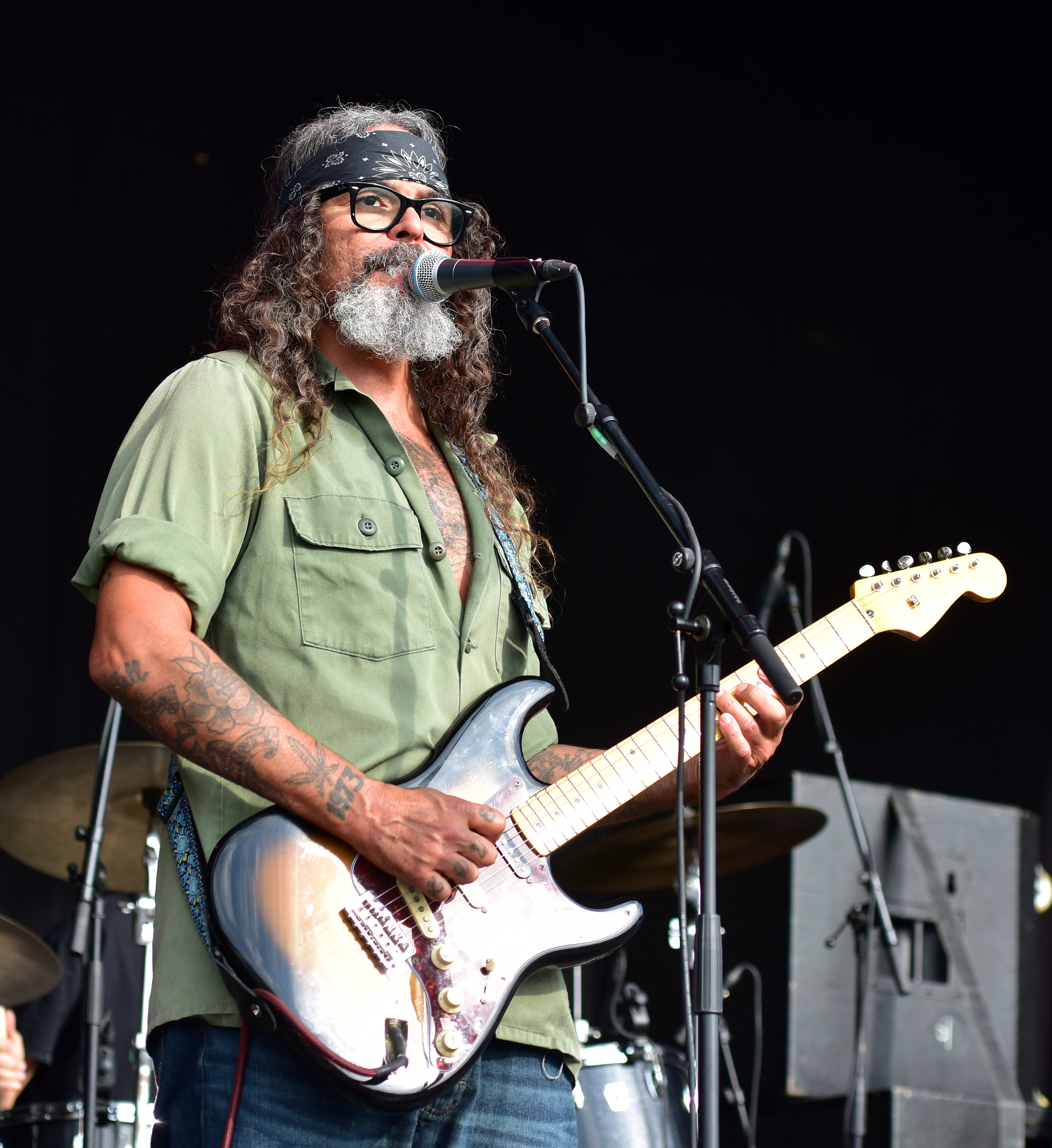
- Brant Bjork at the Burg Herzberg Festival, 2024

Background information
- Born: March 19, 1973 (age 53); Redlands, California, U.S.
- Origin: Palm Springs, California, U.S.
- Genres: Stoner rock; desert rock; heavy metal; hardcore punk
- Occupations: Musician; singer; songwriter; record producer
- Instruments: Drums; vocals; guitar; bass
- Works: Brant Bjork discography
- Years active: 1987–present
- Labels: El Camino; Duna; Man's Ruin; Low Desert Punk; Napalm; Heavy Psych Sounds
- Member of: Stöner; Brant Bjork Trio
- Formerly of: Kyuss; Fu Manchu; Vista Chino; Brant Bjork and the Bros; Brant Bjork and the Low Desert Punk Band; Ché; Mondo Generator; The Desert Sessions; De-Con; LAB; Ten East; Fatso Jetson
- Website: brantbjork.net

Brant Bjork (born March 19, 1973) is an American musician, singer, songwriter and record producer. He is best known as the drummer and founder of the influential Californian stoner rock band Kyuss. Bjork has also been a member of Fu Manchu, Mondo Generator and Vista Chino, the latter with former Kyuss members John Garcia and Nick Oliveri. He is currently the frontman and co-founder of the stoner rock power trio, Stöner. Bjork is one of the more notable figures in the stoner rock and Palm Desert scene and maintains a prolific solo career with over a dozen released albums.

== Musical career ==
=== Kyuss ===
While still in high school, Bjork got together with friends Chris Cockrell, Nick Oliveri, Josh Homme and John Garcia in 1987 to form a band called Katzenjammer. At Bjork's prompting, the band would soon be renamed Sons of Kyuss for a single EP, named after "The Sons of Kyuss" monsters in the Dungeons & Dragons role-playing game, and then later shortened to Kyuss. The band relocated to Los Angeles in 1990 and signed to Chameleon Records, releasing their debut album, Wretch in September 1991. They were then picked up by the major label Elektra Records, becoming the first desert rock band to achieve international success. Bjork was a major creative force in Kyuss, contributing a substantial portion of the band's songwriting, including standout tracks like "Green Machine" and "50 Million Year Trip (Downside Up)". In 1994, Bjork left the band following the release of Welcome to Sky Valley, frustrated at guitarist Homme's growing reluctance to play the songs he was contributing to the band.

Josh and I were the creative force of Kyuss. We had a very deep understanding of the need for each other in getting the band to exist musically. At the time of Sky Valley, I was young, probably about 19 or 20, and I certainly had a lot of artistic vision for Kyuss. I exercised that with Blues for the Red Sun, but when it came time for Sky Valley, there was a conflict in direction between Josh and I. That never really happened before, and I didn't know how to handle it.

— Bjork on the tension in Kyuss.

=== Post-Kyuss ===
After leaving Kyuss, Bjork would go on to play with several different bands, as well as founding the independent label El Camino Records (later Duna Records). Through his label, Bjork would release albums that he was musically involved in, such as hardcore punk band De-Con's 1995 album Balls for Days, on which he played drums. Bjork would also release and produce stoner rock band Solarfeast's 1995 debut Gossamer. Bjork would later go on to join former Kyuss bandmate, Josh Homme, in his Palm Desert musical collective series, The Desert Sessions. He would play a mixture of guitar, bass, drums, and percussion on various tracks on the 1997 releases Volume 1: Instrumental Driving Music For Felons and Volume 2: Status: Ships Commander Butchered, as well as 1999's Volume 5: Poetry for the Masses (SeaShedShitheadByTheSheSore) and Volume 6: Black Anvil Ego.

Bjork briefly moved to Santa Cruz to play guitar for hardcore punk band LAB in 1997 (made up of the remaining members of '80s punk band BL'AST!), playing on their 1997 release, the 7-inch EP "Burning Leaf/Chihuahua". He would also play guitar for Fatso Jetson during 1997–1998, including on their 1998 "Jailbreak" 7-inch split EP with stoner rock band Fu Manchu.

Bjork was playing with another former member of Kyuss, Nick Oliveri, in Oliveri's metal band Mondo Generator. Joining in 1997, Bjork's drumming would feature on the 2000 LP Cocaine Rodeo, and the 2003 LP A Drug Problem That Never Existed. He would tour with the band until leaving in 2004. Bjork also appeared on the live video album Use Once and Destroy Me released in 2004, as well as later releases recorded during his stint lineup, including the 2006 7-inch single "I Never Sleep" and the 2008 Australian Tour EP.

=== Fu Manchu ===
Having produced their debut album No One Rides for Free in 1994, Bjork would officially join Fu Manchu with the release of their critically acclaimed 1997 album The Action Is Go. Bjork would continue to play on every Fu Manchu recording until his departure following the release of 2001's California Crossing, including the albums Eatin' Dust and King of the Road.

=== Solo career ===
Bjork recorded his first solo album, 1999's Jalamanta, in February of that year and performed all of the album's instruments, including guitar and vocals. He would also perform guitar and vocals in the short-lived stoner rock band Ché – a side-project collaboration with former Kyuss and Queens of the Stone Age drummer Alfredo Hernández and former Unida bassist Dave Dinsmore. Ché released their only album, Sounds of Liberation, in October 2000. Bjork's next album, 2002's Brant Bjork & the Operators, named for Bjork's fictional backing band, 'the Operators', was recorded in November 2000 with Bjork again performing vocals and most instruments. He would continue to be the sole performer, except for a few guest spots, on 2003's Keep Your Cool and 2004's Local Angel.

Bjork would form the band Brant Bjork and the Bros in 2003, featuring guitarist Mike Pygmie, bassist Dylan Roche, and drummer Michael Peffer, with Bjork performing vocals and additional guitar. They toured Europe in October 2003, performing a mixture of Bjork's solo material and Ché's Sounds of Liberation. Pygmie was replaced by Scott Cortez Silverman for further touring in Europe and North America in 2004. This line-up went on to record the 2005 double album Saved by Magic. The album featured a return to the sound of Bjork's earlier sound from his Jalamanta/Sounds of Liberation era.

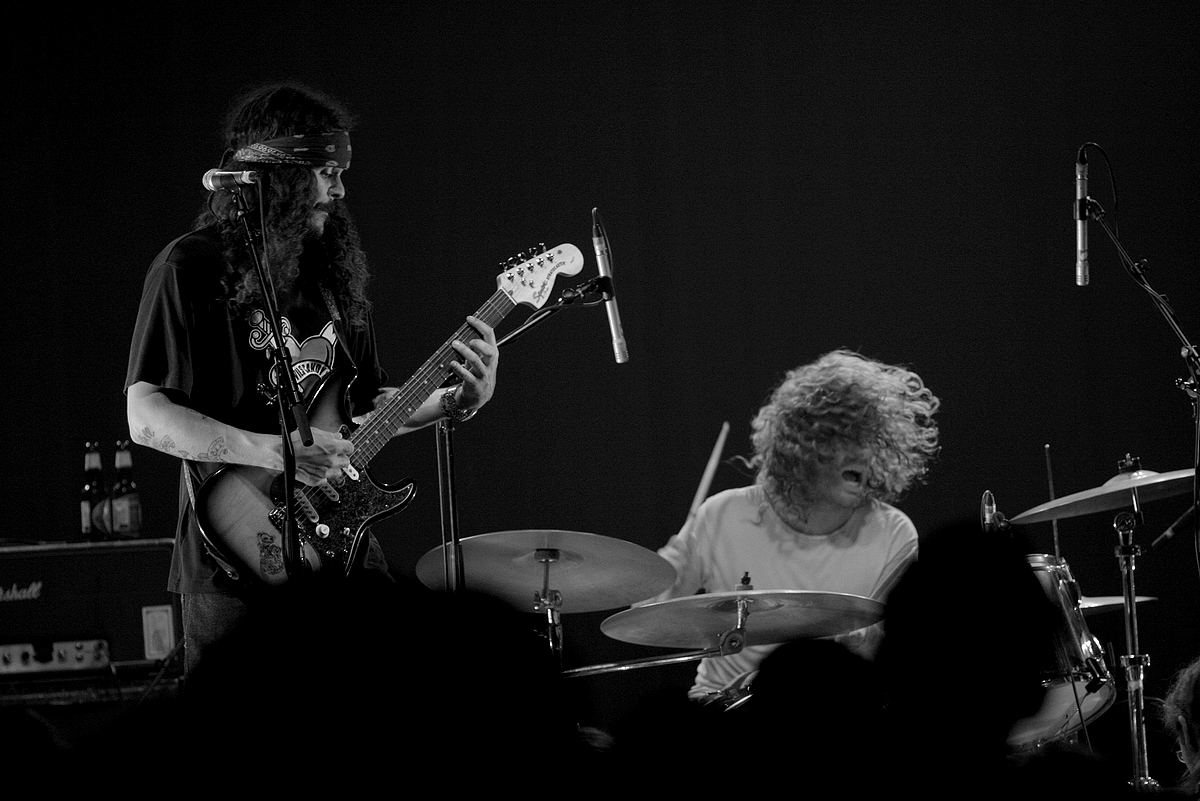
Bjork playing live with the Bros in 2006

2006 saw the release of Sabbia, a feature film "visual soundtrack" by filmmaker Kate McCabe, featuring Bjork's music. Brant Bjork and the Bros would go on to record another album, 2007's Somera Sól, with Alfredo Hernández replacing Michael Peffer on drums. In the same year, Bjork released his fifth solo album, Tres Dias, an acoustic album featuring reinterpretations of older songs, as well as some new material. The title of the album (Three Days) comes from the purported amount of time that Bjork claimed it took to record it at producer Tony Mason's house in Joshua Tree, California.

Bjork reported in 2007 that he had ended his label, Duna Records, citing that it took too much time and energy to run. Bjork soon created a new label, Low Desert Punk Recordings, and the Duna Records website now functions as a Brant Bjork community fansite and forum. The first release on the new label was Bjork's 2008 album, Punk Rock Guilt, made up of recordings from December 2005 referred to as the "New Jersey Sessions". This release was followed up with the 2010 album Gods & Goddesses. Recorded in LA in 2009, Gods & Goddesses was the first Brant Bjork solo album not to be primarily recorded by Bjork himself. Instead, Bjork recorded with a new line-up of musicians including guitarist Brandon Henderson, former Yawning Man bassist Billy Cordell, and former Mondo Generator drummer Giampaolo Farnedi.

In March 2014, Bjork announced that he would tour Australia in May with his backing band, the 'Low Desert Punks', consisting of bassist Dave Dinsmore, guitarist Bubba Dupree, and Tony Tornay on drums. He would later announce a New Zealand tour with dates in June. In November, an album, Black Power Flower was released on Napalm Records under the name Brant Bjork and the Low Desert Punk Band.

In June 2018, Bjork announced his new album, Mankind Woman. The album released on September 14, 2018, on Heavy Psych Sounds. Mankind Woman was noted for its "smoother and more laid back" style and psychedelic influences, compared to Bjork's previous work. The album was produced by Bubba Dupree, also serving as guitarist throughout. Another notable feature was the shared lead vocals between Bjork and long-time friend Sean Wheeler, who also performed as special guest on the subsequent Mankind Woman album tour in North America and Europe. Brant Bjork handpicked Danish The Sonic Dawn as his European tour support, echoing the psychedelic touches of Mankind Woman.

In April 2019, a new solo record entitled Jacoozzi was released. Originally recorded in 2010 and then shelved, Jacoozzi is an instrumental album, featuring jazz and funk influences with break beats. Bjork explains the material was improvisation meant to lead up to a new solo record. But Vista Chino started up around that time and thus the album was shelved. It was released on April 5, 2019, on Heavy Psych Sounds.

In May 2019, a 'remixed and remastered' reissue of Jalamanta was announced, set for release on September 13, 2019, on Heavy Psych Sounds, 20 years after the album's initial release. The remix was done by Tony Mason, who also did the original mix, and the remastering was done by John McBain at JPM Mastering, San Francisco.

In May 2020, Bjork released his eponymous studio album, Brant Bjork, on Heavy Psych Sounds.

In October 2022, Bjork released his sixteenth solo album, Bougainvillea Suite, on Heavy Psych Sounds. Bjork has described the album as "bittersweet" since it is his last record to be recorded in his studio in Joshua Tree. The album features contributions from his Stöner bandmates.

In 2023, Bjork announced a tour with his new backing band, the Brant Bjork Trio. The lineup includes bassist Mario Lalli of Fatso Jetson and Stöner drummer Ryan Güt.

=== Vista Chino ===
In November 2010, it was announced that Bjork was forming Kyuss Lives! with Bruno Fevery on guitar, Nick Oliveri on bass and John Garcia on vocals. The band undertook a European, Australian and New Zealand tour from March to May 2011. In November 2012, Kyuss Lives! announced that they had changed their name to Vista Chino.

Vista Chino released their debut album Peace on September 3, 2013, through Napalm Records.

He played with the band until October 2014, at which point Nick Oliveri announced there was a falling out and that Bjork and Garcia would continue working on their solo projects.

=== Stöner ===
In early 2020, Bjork formed the stoner rock power trio, Stöner, alongside Oliveri and Ryan Güt, the drummer for Bjork's solo band. In October, the trio made their live debut performing on the fourth volume of the concert series Live in the Mojave Desert. The album was released on April 30. In June 2021, the band released their debut album, Stoners Rule. Stöner released their sophomore album, Totally..., in May 2022. In February 2023, the band released their debut EP, Boogie to Baja.

== Gear ==
- Drums:

Ludwig Drums 24x16 Bass Drum, 14x13 Tom Tom, 16x16 Floor Tom, 18x16 Floor Tom, 14x6.5 Snare

- Cymbals:

Paiste 15" sound edge hi-hats', 22" Signature Reflector Heavy Full Crash', 22" 2002 Heavy Ride', 22" 2002 Crash

- Pro-mark: 2b Drumsticks

In the early days of Kyuss, Brant would reverse his sticks to get more power. Towards the end of his stint with Kyuss, Brant used Zildjian Rock Sticks. During his time with Fu Manchu, Brant used various Ludwig drum kits, including the kit he used in Kyuss, but primarily used a blonde maple Ludwig with a 26x16 kick, 14x14 tom and a 18x18 floor tom. His cymbals were Zildjian A's, 20 and 22 crashes and ride and 15 or 16 inch hats. His sticks varied from 5b's or 2b's from Vater, Vic Firth or Pro-mark turned upside down for maximum power.

- Guitars:

Fender Stratocaster, Gibson SG, Gibson Firebird

- Amps:

Marshall Heads and Cabs

- Effects:

Fuzzrocious 420 Fuzz, Dunlop Fuzz Face, Dunlop Echoplex, Dunlop Cry Baby Wah, MXR Phase 90

== Discography ==
=== Brant Bjork ===
Title	Album details
Jalamanta	Released: 1999
Brant Bjork & the Operators	Released: 2002
Keep Your Cool	Released: 2003
Local Angel	Released: 2004
Tres Dias	Released: 2007
Punk Rock Guilt	Released: 2008
Gods & Goddesses	Released: 2010
Tao of the Devil	Released: 2016
Europe '16	Released: 2017
Mankind Woman	Released: 2018
Jacoozzi	Released: 2019
Brant Bjork	Released: 2020
Bougainvillea Suite	Released: 2022

=== Brant Bjork and the Bros ===
Title	Album details
Saved by Magic	Released: 2005
Somera Sól	Released: 2007
Live in the High Desert	Released: 2025

=== Brant Bjork and the Low Desert Punk Band ===
Title	Album details
Black Power Flower	Released: 2014

=== Brant Bjork Trio ===
Title	Album details
Once Upon a Time in the Desert	Released: 2024
