= Punk Rock Guilt =

Studio album by Brant Bjork
- Released: May 13, 2008
- Recorded: December 2005
- Studios: Glide On Fade Studios, New Jersey
- Genres: Stoner rock; desert rock
- Length: 47:00
- Labels: Low Desert Punk; Heavy Psych Sounds Records (2020 reissue)
- Producer: Dave Raphael

Brant Bjork chronology
Somera Sól (2007)	Punk Rock Guilt (2008)	Gods & Goddesses (2010)

Alternative cover
- Heavy Psych Sounds reissue

Professional ratings
Review scores
Source	Rating
New Zealand Herald	4/5 stars
Sputnikmusic	4/5 stars
MikeLadano.com	4/5 stars

Punk Rock Guilt is the eighth solo album by stoner rock musician Brant Bjork. The album was released on May 13, 2008 on Low Desert Punk Records. Initially having been recorded and shelved in 2005 under the title The New Jersey Sessions.

== Track listing ==
All tracks are written by Brant Bjork.

No.	Title	Length
1.	"Lion One"	10:28
2.	"Dr. Special"	2:56
3.	"Punk Rock Guilt"	4:04
4.	"This Place (Just Ain't Our Place)"	4:35
5.	"Shocked by the Static"	5:20
6.	"Born to Rock"	6:03
7.	"Plant Your Seed"	3:04
8.	"Locked and Loaded"	10:30
Total length:		47:00

== Credits ==
- Produced by Dave Raphael
- Recorded and mixed December 2005 by Dave Raphael at Glide On Fade Studios, New Jersey
- Mastered by Dave Collins Los Angeles, California

== Notes ==
- The album was remastered and re-released in 2020 with new artwork on Bjork's current label, Heavy Psych Sounds.
- The promotional release of this album had placed all of the songs in a different order, and titled them all incorrectly save for the title track.
- The promo release and 2LP feature a bonus track, which is "Chinarosa" from the previous two albums, done in the style to fit this album's sound.
- One song cut from the album was released via the record label's website entitled "Jenny" - (3:12).
