= Duna Records =

- Founder: Brant Bjork
- Country of origin: United States

Duna Records is a record label founded by desert rocker Brant Bjork.

As of mid-September 2007 the dunarecords.com website no longer hosted tour dates or album information, being replaced with a simple text message "Brant Bjork is a modern guitar hero and rock legend, hailing from infamous stoner rock bands such as Kyuss, Fu Manchu, and Ché. He currently tours with his own band Brant Bjork & the Bros." Since July 2009, dunarecords.com has morphed into a Brant Bjork fansite hosting reviews and interviews, album information, videos, discographies, links, tour dates, and a community forum.

Duna has since been revived under the new name "Low Desert Punk Recordings". First release is Brant Bjork's Punk Rock Guilt.

== Discography ==
Artist	Title	Format	Catalog number
Brant Bjork	Brant Bjork & the Operators	CD	Duna-001
Brant Bjork	Jalamanta	LP	Duna-002
Brant Bjork	Jalamanta	CD	Duna-003
Brant Bjork	Keep Your Cool	CD/LP	Duna-004
Brant Bjork	Local Angel	CD	Duna-005
Brant Bjork	Local Angel	LP	Duna-006
Vic Du Monte's Idiot Prayer	Prey For The City	CD	Duna-007
Vic Du Monte's Idiot Prayer	Prey For The City	LP	Duna-008
Brant Bjork and the Bros	Saved by Magic	CD	Duna-009
Brant Bjork and the Bros	Saved by Magic	LP	Duna-010
John McBain	The In-Flight Feature	CD	Duna-011
John Mcbain	The In-Flight Feature	LP	Duna-012
Brant Bjork & Kate McCabe	Sabbia	DVD	Duna-013
Brant Bjork	Tres Dias	LP	Duna-014
Brant Bjork	Tres Dias	CD	Duna-015
Brant Bjork and the Bros	Somera Sól	LP	Duna-016
Brant Bjork and the Bros	Somera Sól	CD	Duna-017
Brant Bjork	Punk Rock Guilt	CD/LP	LDP-1973
Brant Bjork and the Bros	Somera Sól	CD	LDP-1974
Ché	Sounds of Liberation	LP	LDP-1975
Brant Bjork	Brant Bjork & the Operators	LP	LDP-1976
Ché	Sounds of Liberation	CD	LDP-1977
Brant Bjork and the Bros	Live Album (Unreleased)	?	LDP-1978
Brant Bjork	Jalamanta	LP	LDP-1979
Brant Bjork	Gods & Goddesses	CD/LP	LDP-1980
Brant Bjork Trio	Once Upon a Time in the Desert	CD/LP	Duna-018
Brant Bjork and the Bros	Live in the High Desert	CD/LP	Duna-019

== See also ==
- List of record labels
