= Use Once and Destroy Me =

Use Once And Destroy Me

Video by Mondo Generator
- Released: September 7, 2004
- Recorded: 2003
- Genre: Stoner rock, alternative metal
- Label: Tornado, Cargo Records

Use Once and Destroy Me is a DVD filmed on the 2003 tour of Europe and the United States by Mondo Generator. It was released on September 7, 2004 by Tornado Records. It is currently being distributed by Cargo Records Germany.

== Chapters ==
- "Six Shooter" - Amsterdam, Holland
- "Here We Come" - Los Angeles, US
- "Ode to Clarissa" - Birmingham, England
- "Shawnette" - Hamburg
- "I Want You to Die" - Glasgow, Scotland
- "Scottish Girl" - Glasgow, Scotland
- "Detroit" - Manchester, England
- "F.Y.I.F." - Glasgow, Scotland
- "Jr. High Love" - Manchester, England
- "Backstage" - Hamburg
- "Allen's Wrench" - Hamburg & London
- "Do the Headright" - Hamburg
- "Unless I Can Kill" - Berlin, Germany
- "So High, So Low" - Manchester, England
- "13th Floor" - Berlin & Hamburg
- "Open Up and Bleed for Me" - Hamburg
- "Simple Exploding Man" - Hamburg
- "Backstage" - London, England
- Credits

=== Bonus footage ===
- "Miss Mary" - Portland, Oregon
- "So High, So Low" - Dallas, Texas (filmed at Lollapalooza)
- "Ya Me Voy" - Hamburg
- "Ode to Clarissa" - Los Angeles (features Dave Grohl on drums, Jeordie White and Josh Homme on guitars)

== Personnel ==
- Nick Oliveri - vocals
- Brant Bjork - drums
- Dave Catching - guitars
- Molly McGuire - bass guitar
- Deborah Viereck - photography and video
- John Leamy - cover design
- Bob Sexton - "Ode To Clarissa" bonus video
