= Keep Your Cool =

Studio album by Brant Bjork
- Released: October 21, 2003
- Studio: Glide On Fade Studios, New Jersey
- Genre: Stoner rock; desert rock
- Length: 33:14
- Label: Duna Records; Heavy Psych Sounds Records (2019 reissue)
- Producer: Brant Bjork & Dave Raphael

Brant Bjork chronology
Brant Bjork & the Operators (2002)	Keep Your Cool (2003)	Local Angel (2004)

Alternative cover
- Heavy Psych Sounds reissue

Keep Your Cool is the third solo album by desert rocker Brant Bjork. It was released on October 31, 2003, through Duna Records. The album features a musical style influenced by soul, funk and blues. The album was remastered and reissued in 2019 through Heavy Psych Sounds Records.

== Reception ==
Professional ratings
Review scores
Source	Rating
AllMusic	3/5 stars
Sputnikmusic	4/5 stars

Sputnikmusic mentioned in their review that the songs consist of "mid-paced, often blues/funk influenced riffs leading them, accompanied with Bjork's relaxed, swagger-filled vocals."

== Track listing ==
All tracks are written by Brant Bjork

No.	Title	Length
1.	"Hey, Monkey Boy"	2:07
2.	"Johnny Called"	4:03
3.	"Rock-n-Rol'é"	4:25
4.	"I Miss My Chick"	4:08
5.	"Keep Your Cool"	2:47
6.	"Gonna Make the Scene"	5:00
7.	"Searchin'..."	3:56
8.	"My Soul"	6:48
Total length:		33:14

== Personnel ==
- Brant Bjork – drums, guitars, bass, percussion, vocals, producer, artwork
- Dave Raphael – producer, recording engineer
- Mathias "Schneebie" Schneeberger – mastering
- Claudio Gruer – mastering (Heavy Psych Sounds reissue)
- Denise DiVitto – management, photography
- Cale Bunker – artwork, layout
- DUNArt – artwork
- Branca Studio – design (Heavy Psych Sounds reissue)

== Notes ==
- In many live performances, Brant Bjork and the Bros have been known to perform an extended jam of the song "I Miss My Chick" and lead into a cover of Cream's "Sunshine of Your Love" or Gary Numan's "Cars".
