= Ten East =

American rock band

Ten East is an experimental/jam rock project based in the Palm Desert and Los Angeles area of the United States. The musicians involved share a common respect for improvised jamming mixed with years of playing and listening to all types of rock, psychedelic, Latin, jazz, blues, surf and punk music. The end result is an intense, cohesive wall of sound of heavy, dark, instrumental blues with psychedelic and surf overtones.

The name "Ten East" comes from the highway which leads from the heart of Los Angeles towards the desert cities. The music is an expression of feelings that overcome oneself as they travel the two hours time down the length of highway, leaving behind the bustling metropolis and suburban sprawl in the wake of the mesa, mountains, and distant windmills.

Their debut album, Extraterrestrial Highway, was released in October 2006 on the record label Cobraside. The second album The Robot's Guide to Freedom was released in 2008, on the Lexicon Devil label.

The new Ten East lineup featuring Gary Arce, Bill Stinson and Erik Harbers & Pieter Holkenborg from the band Automatic Sam, opened for Yawning Man and Fatso Jetson at the Deventer show (NL) at De Hip on February 13, 2015. They played new songs from their 2016 album, Skyline Pressure.

== Band members ==
- Gary Arce – guitar (Yawning Man, Big Scenic Nowhere)
- Mario Lalli – guitar (Fatso Jetson, Yawning Man)
- Bill Stinson – drums (Yawning Man, Big Scenic Nowhere)
- Bryan Giles – guitar (Red Fang)
- Scott Reeder – bass (Kyuss, The Obsessed)
- Brant Bjork – bass (Kyuss, Fu Manchu)
- Greg Ginn – guitar, organ (Black Flag, Gone)
- Erik Harbers – bass (Automatic Sam)
- Pieter Holkenborg – guitar (Automatic Sam)

== Albums ==
Extraterrestrial Highway (2006)
No.	Title	Length
1.	"Heavy Light"	10:31
2.	"Aqua Bird"	6:36
3.	"Scraping the Barrel"	6:57
4.	"Draggin' Balls"	10:18
5.	"Extraterrestrial Highway"	3:55
6.	"Spiritual Hangover"	3:48
7.	"Progressive Guillitine"	12:46
8.	"Expanding Darkness"	4:16

The Robot's Guide to Freedom (2008)
No.	Title	Length
1.	"Nocturnal Migration"	7:13
2.	"Sun Filter"	4:37
3.	"Hogbreath"	2:46
4.	"Ocean Dome"	4:58
5.	"Octopad"	3:53
6.	"Silkworm"	8:34
7.	"Hexxon"	6:06
8.	"Moon Tail"	4:27
9.	"Where the Hunted Hide"	6:18
10.	"Lockjaw"	3:34

Skyline Pressure (2016)
No.	Title	Length
1.	"Daisy Cutter"	13:02
2.	"Eye Soar"	4:42
3.	"Historical Graffiti"	5:40
4.	"Planet Blues"	6:21
5.	"Skyline Pressure"	5:50
6.	"Sonars and Myths"	14:33
7.	"Stalactite Dip"	3:13
8.	"Tangled Forest"	5:26
