= Throw Rag =

American punk rock band

- Origin: Salton Sea, California, U.S.
- Genres: Punk rock, psychobilly, rock and roll, desert rock
- Years active: 1993–present
- Labels: Acetate Records; BYO Records
- Members: Sean Wheeler; Francis "Franco" Cronin; Patrick "Dino" Bostrom; Daniel "Scorcho" Lapham
- Past members: Jacko; Chango; Chino; King Taco Pearl; The Outlaw; Barfly; Col. Riptide Tenmen; Gusto; John Summers; Louis Bluefeather; Talmadge Black; Chance Roulette; Dr. Brittle Bones ("outpatient")
- Website: www.throwrag.com

Throw Rag is an American four-piece punk rock band from the Salton Sea, California, United States. Formed in 1993, Throw Rag has been fronted by Sean Wheeler (a.k.a. Captain Sean Doe, a.k.a. Diamond Boss, a.k.a. Sun Trash) since the inception of the band. Other current members of the band are Patrick Bostrom (a.k.a. Dino, a.k.a. Dean McQueen) on lead guitar, Frank Cronin (a.k.a. Franco Fontana, a.k.a. New Rome Emperor) on bass, and Daniel Lapham (a.k.a. Scorcho) on sampler. In its various incarnations, Throw Rag has been categorized as rockabilly, punk rock, psychobilly, and sailor rock. They have blended sounds of traditional rock and roll, country, and surf.

== History ==
Throw Rag started up in October 1993 with founding members Sean Wheeler (vocals), Roger "Chino" Smith (drums), and Dan "Scorcho" Lapham (rhythm guitar). Also in the original lineup were bassist Danny "Talmadge" Black (who wrote Table 4 3) and guitarist Michael "The Outlaw" McCartney. Throw Rag played primarily at the Indio, California venue Rhythm and Brews (operated by renowned desert musician Mario Lalli, whose song "King Baby" was also performed by the band) throughout 1994 with other shows in Orange County, CA. Other members of the early Throw Rag were Scott "Barfly" Brooks (bass) and Tom "Colonel Riptide Tenmen" Lynn (banjo and vibes). By the end of 1994, Francis "Franco" Cronin (bass fiddle), Patrick "Dino" Bostrom (lead guitar), and Craig "Jacko" Jackman (lord of scum) had joined the band.

From late 1996 through mid-1997, the band saw more lineup changes as Jacko left temporarily to be replaced on occasion by John Summers a.k.a. Johnny Bloodstreak on washboard and vocals. Also on board during this period were Louis Bluefeather (harmonica and didgeridoo) and Dr. Brittle Bones (tambourine and onstage medical assistance).

From 1995, many of the songs that would eventually make it onto the debut album (Tee-Tot) were featured on compilations. Tee-Tot saw its first release on Hellnote Records in 1999. The album featured musical contributions from Wheeler, Scorcho, Dino, Franco, Jacko, Chino, and Tony "Gusto" Portillo (drums). Supported by Tee-Tot, and bolstered by new rhythm guitarist A.J. "King Taco Pearl" Nesselrod, Throw Rag started building a wider fan base with their intense, maniacal live shows. Usually wearing a sea captain's hat and 70s double-knit suit, Wheeler and Jacko (with nothing more than a wife beater and double knit pants) became notorious for stripping on stage. The band eventually started opening for acts such as Supersuckers, Green Day, Wesley Willis and Willie Nelson. In 2001, the band released a CD split with Supersuckers which featured a song that would later appear a Warped Tour 2002 Tour Compilation and their follow up album Desert Shores. Tee-Tot was only released in smaller record stores, and was available at live shows. Now out of print, Acetate plans to re-release the album in 2008.

Desert Shores was released June 3, 2003, on BYO Records. Critics referred to the album as "fun" record, and compared highly to The Damned.

"Throw Rag's approach to punk rock is refreshing and yet still time-honored. "Space Hump Me" has a lot of early-'70s punk in it, particularly with the sneering vocals and simple arrangement such as the Damned."

Throw Rag takes the anything-goes attitude of early Damned and grafts it to the purposefully sloppy riffs of boozy bar punk to get a record that celebrates punk's cut-loose mentality that's frequently lost in the dead-serious world of rock'n’roll rebellion. Desert Shores isn't going to change the world (psst – neither will Rancid's latest Clash copy, either, so get over it) but it's sure made for a rollicking punk rock-up."

In 2004, Kung Fu Films approached Throw Rag to star in their 15th Episode of The Show Must Go Off! and, on April 29, 2004, Throw Rag's performance (opening for the Circle Jerks) was recorded Live at the House of Blues of Anaheim. On November 2, 2004, the DVD was released. This featured all six members of Throw Rag. Shortly thereafter, King Taco Pearl left the band to sustain a family life.

After 25 months of relentless touring, 2005 saw the release of 13 Feet and Rising, which featured guest vocals by Keith Morris, Jello Biafra, and a cover of the Merle Haggard song "Tonight the Bottle Let Me Down", which featured guest vocalist Lemmy.

Throw Rag's fourth full-length album entitled 2nd Place was released on June 10, 2008. This album features a mix of both new and older songs.
