= Ché (band) =

American rock band

- Origin: California, U.S.
- Genres: Stoner rock; desert rock
- Years active: 1999–2000
- Labels: Man's Ruin; Low Desert Punk; Heavy Psych Sounds
- Spinoff of: Kyuss; Unida
- Past members: Brant Bjork; Dave Dinsmore; Alfredo Hernández

Ché was an American stoner rock band founded by former Kyuss drummers Brant Bjork and Alfredo Hernández, and former Unida bassist Dave Dinsmore. Ché released their only album, Sounds of Liberation, in 2000.

== Overview ==
Though best known at the time of the album's release as a drummer, Ché featured Bjork as the band's vocalist and guitarist. Another of Bjork's bands, Brant Bjork and the Bros, covered many of Ché's songs during their live performances, with Alfredo Hernández making occasional guest appearances with the band.

According to Bjork, he had been friends with Hernández and Dinsmore for years; they began playing together in the late 1990s after Hernández left Queens of the Stone Age.

== Members ==
- Brant Bjork – vocals, guitar
- Dave Dinsmore – bass
- Alfredo Hernández – drums, percussion

== Sounds of Liberation ==
Sounds of Liberation

Studio album by Ché
- Released: October 3, 2000
- Recorded: February 20–23, 2000
- Studios: Donner & Blitzen, Silver Lake, California
- Genres: Stoner rock; desert rock
- Length: 35:35
- Labels: Man's Ruin; Low Desert Punk; Heavy Psych Sounds (2023 reissue)
- Producers: Ché; Mathias Schneeberger

Professional ratings
Review scores
Source	Rating
AllMusic	4/5 stars
Rock Hard	5/10
MikeLadano.com	4/5 stars

=== Track listings ===
All tracks are written by Ché.

CD
No.	Title	Length
1.	"Hydraulicks"	4:23
2.	"The Knife"	3:39
3.	"Pray for Rock"	5:17
4.	"Sounds of Liberation"	6:11
5.	"Adelante"	5:13
6.	"Blue Demon"	6:13
7.	"The Day the Pirate Retired"	4:39

LP

Side A
No.	Title	Length
1.	"Hydraulicks"	4:23
2.	"The Knife"	3:39
3.	"Pray for Rock"	5:17
4.	"The Day the Pirate Retired"	4:39

Side B
No.	Title	Length
5.	"Sounds of Liberation"	6:11
6.	"Adelante"	5:13
7.	"Blue Demon"	6:13

Notes

- The album was reissued in September 2023 by Heavy Psych Sounds Records.
