= Yawning Man =

American experimental rock band

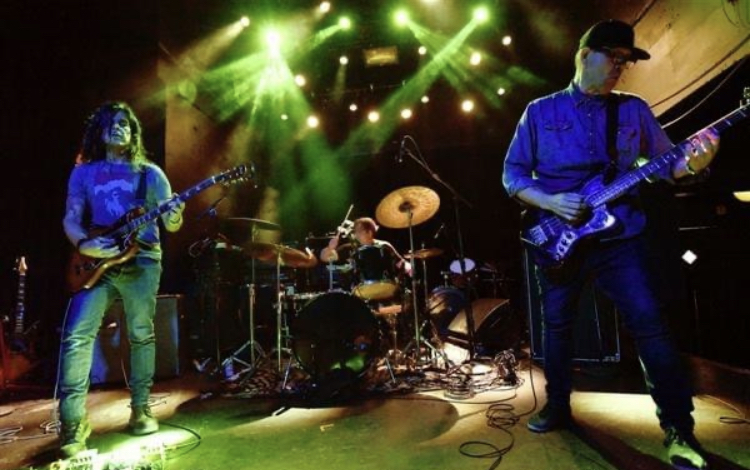
- Yawning Man performing at The Echo in 2019; left to right: Gary Arce, Bill Stinson and Mario Lalli

Background information
- Origin: La Quinta, California, U.S.
- Genres: Instrumental rock; stoner rock; desert rock; psychedelic rock; experimental rock; heavy psych
- Years active: 1986–present
- Labels: Go Down; Alone; Plastic Cactus; Heavy Psych Sounds; Ripple Music
- Spinoffs: Fatso Jetson; Yawning Sons; Yawning Balch; Big Scenic Nowhere; Ten East; WaterWays; Mario Lalli & the Rubber Snake Charmers
- Spinoff of: Across the River
- Members: Gary Arce; Billy Cordell; Greg Saenz; Mario Lalli (hiatus); Bill Stinson (hiatus)
- Past members: Larry Lalli; Alfredo Hernández; Randy Reantaso
- Website: yawningman.com

Yawning Man is an American experimental rock band from La Quinta, California. The band originally formed in 1986, although they released no studio recordings until 2005. They have been noted to be one of the first influential bands in the desert rock scene.

== History ==
Yawning Man was formed in 1986, founded by Gary Arce, Alfredo Hernández, Mario Lalli, and Larry Lalli. At this time, the band started to play marathon jams during sets performed in the only readily available venues at the time: garages around town and impromptu concerts staged in the nearby desert. As word spread of these parties they evolved into what were called "generator parties" which were informal concerts held deep in the uninhabited desert outskirts of the cities in the Coachella Valley, gradually attracting larger and larger crowds to their shows.

Their music heavily influenced the likes of John Garcia, Josh Homme, and Brant Bjork (who would later form the stoner rock band Kyuss) to name only a few. When Hernandez played in Kyuss on their last album ...And the Circus Leaves Town (1995) they recorded a cover of Yawning Man's song "Catamaran".

From 1986 to 1987, 30 to 40 songs were recorded on 2 different demos but no official Yawning Man material was ever released until 2005. Yawning Man's music began to mutate into strange loops with an almost dark/free-form jazz punk sound, and the name of the band just didn't fit the music anymore. The band changed name to The Sort of Quartet and in the mid '90s released three albums with SST Records and one with German label Hot Wax Crippled Dick. During this time, the Lalli cousins also achieved recognition with their band Fatso Jetson, which briefly included Arce.

In 2005, Yawning Man's first LP Rock Formations was released on the Spanish label Alone Records. It is a collection of 10 tracks recorded in late 2004 and described as "a melancholic mix of acoustic space rock with elements of surf music, as well as middle eastern guitar style". Months later, Pot Head, a four-track EP, would be released. In 2006, Rock Formations was re-released with a limited edition bonus DVD recorded at W2 club in Den Bosch, Netherlands on June 17, 2005, during their European tour.

In 2007, Yawning Man was to release a collection of past material on a double album known as The Birth of Sol Music. The album would include 30 older songs from the late 1980s with an extensive booklet including information about the band and the whole Palm Desert connection. According to band member Gary Arce, this release has been postponed indefinitely. In 2009, The Birth of Sol Music (The Demo Tapes) was released on iTunes as a two-disc set containing 24 songs.

In 2007, an LP called Vista Point, a combination of the Rock Formations and Pot Head releases, was released. In 2009, members of Yawning Man collaborated with British band Sons of Alpha Centauri to release the album Ceremony to the Sunset under the band name Yawning Sons. The album was well received by music critics, with Echoes and Dust labelling it a "classic". In 2021, the second Yawning Sons album, Sky Island, was released.

Yawning Man was the sickest desert band of all time. (...) Sometimes it would be a scene; sometimes it would be very intimate. (...) They were kinda like a house band. It wasn't militant like Black Flag. It was very drugged, very stone-y, it was very mystical. Everyone's just tripping, and they're just playing away, for hours.

— Brant Bjork (2002)

In 2010, Yawning Man released their second studio album Nomadic Pursuits under the imprint of Cobraside Records. Its cover art was composed and delivered by Hernández. Following the release of the album, the band embarked on a tour across Europe with Bill Stinson and Billy Cordell replacing Hernández and Mario Lalli as touring members respectively. The Nomadic Pursuits tour concluded with a headline show at the DesertFest in London and Berlin in April 2013 with Yawning Sons and Fatso Jetson. The band then self-released a dedicated tour vinyl with Fatso Jetson.

In August 2014, Yawning Man returned to Europe with Arce, Mario Lalli, and Stinson for a tour that ran from August 29 to September 7, after which they undertook the Legends of the Desert Tour with Fatso Jetson from February 2 to 28, 2015.

In 2016, Yawning Man released their third studio album Historical Graffiti, which marked the first studio recordings to feature Stinson on drums. The album also featured Adolfo Trepiana on bandoneon, Sara Ryan on violin and Malene Arce on mellotron, and it was recorded by Leonardo Checchia at Ion Studios in Buenos Aires, Argentina while the band were on tour. The first vinyl pressings were released by Lay Bare Records and later re-released by Cobraside Records. In 2017, Yawning Man went on their first ever tour of the United States and Canada to support the album's release.

In 2018, Yawning Man released their fourth studio album The Revolt Against Tired Noises. Six of the eight songs are in the instrumental tradition the band is mostly known for, however two tracks feature the rare appearance of a vocalist (bassist Mario Lalli) alongside Gary Arce's dream-weaving guitar work and Bill Stinson's drums. One of these tracks of notable mention is the song "Catamaran", a Yawning Man song made popular by the legendary influential desert rock band Kyuss on their 1995 release ...And the Circus Leaves Town. The Kyuss cover of Catamaran proved to be a favorite among Kyuss fans, spreading the word about Yawning Man's unique rock music. On The Revolt Against Tired Noises, Yawning Man finally released this classic song, properly recorded for the first time in 30 years.

In 2019, the band released their fifth studio album Macedonian Lines. The album received an 8/10 by Distorted Sound, stating in their conclusion, "Psychedelic, intricate and expressive, this is a cool but well put together record."

In 2020, the band released a live album titled Live at Giant Rock which was recorded as a live concert film at the Mojave Desert site known as Giant Rock. The album was heavily influenced by the Pink Floyd concert film Live at Pompeii.

In June 2023, the band released their sixth studio album, Long Walk of the Navajo, which features returning bassist Billy Cordell. The band had also formed a collaborative group known as Yawning Balch, featuring the members of Yawning Man with the addition of Bob Balch from Big Scenic Nowhere and Fu Manchu. The first volume of the group's recording sessions together was released in July. A second volume was scheduled for release in November.

In November 2025, the band—now consisting of founding members Gary Arce and Mario Lalli with Bill Stinson—is set to release the album Pavement Ends on Heavy Psych Sounds Records. The first single from the album is “Bomba Negra”. The release will be followed by a tour of central Europe in Nov–Dec 2025.

== Members ==
=== Current members ===
- Gary Arce – guitar (1986–present)
- Mario Lalli – bass, vocals (1986–present)
- Bill Stinson – drums (2011–present)

=== Former members ===
- Alfredo Hernández – drums (1986–2011)
- Larry Lalli – guitar, bass
- Randy Reantaso – percussions
- Billy Cordell – bass (2022–2025)
- Greg Saenz – drums (2023–2025)

=== Former touring members ===
- Justine Ruiz – bass, guitar (2016)
- Greg Saenz – drums (2018)
- Billy Cordell – bass (2005–2012)

== Discography ==
=== Studio albums ===
Rock Formations (2005)
No.	Title	Length
1.	"Rock Formations"	5:21
2.	"Perpetual Oyster"	5:22
3.	"Stoney Lonesome"	6:02
4.	"Split Tooth Thunder"	2:58
5.	"Sonny Bono Memorial Freeway"	3:52
6.	"Airport Boulevard"	5:22
7.	"Advanced Darkness"	2:33
8.	"She Scares Me"	4:09
9.	"Crater Lake"	3:37
10.	"Buffalo Chips"	4:27

Nomadic Pursuits (2010)
No.	Title	Length
1.	"Camel Tow"	5:02
2.	"Sand Whip"	6:54
3.	"Far-off Adventure (Eastern Interests)"	8:28
4.	"Blue Foam (WaterWays)"	6:42
5.	"Ground Swell"	6:16
6.	"Camel Tow Too"	5:00
7.	"Laster Arte (Nomadic Pursuits)"	4:28

Historical Graffiti (2016)
No.	Title	Length
1.	"The Wind Cries Edalyn"	8:31
2.	"Her Phantom Finger of Copenhagen"	6:58
3.	"Naomi Crayola"	3:05
4.	"The Secret Language of Elephants"	6:27
5.	"Historical Graffiti"	7:48

The Revolt Against Tired Noises (2018)
No.	Title	Length
1.	"Black Kite"	5:21
2.	"Revolt Against Tired Noises"	5:26
3.	"Skyline Pressure"	7:40
4.	"Grant's Heart"	3:17
5.	"Violent Lights"	6:32
6.	"Catamaran"	3:02
7.	"Misfortune Cookies"	3:31
8.	"Ghost Beach"	5:04

Macedonian Lines (2019)
No.	Title	Length
1.	"Virtual Funeral"	6:50
2.	"Macedonian Lines"	4:44
3.	"Melancholy Sadie"	4:48
4.	"Bowie's Last Breath"	4:02
5.	"I'm Not a Real Indian (But I Play One on TV)"	3:22
6.	"I Make Wierd Choices"	7:21

Long Walk of the Navajo (2023)
No.	Title	Length
1.	"Long Walk of the Navajo"	15:08
2.	"Respiratory Pause"	13:25
3.	"Blood Sand"	9:05

Pavement Ends (2025)
No.	Title	Length
1.	"Burrito Power"	4:41
2.	"Gestapo Pop"
3.	"Bomba Negra"	5:05
4.	"Dust Suppression"
5.	"Pavement Ends"
6.	"Bad Day To Be Alive"

=== EPs ===
Pot Head (2005)
No.	Title	Length
1.	"Manolete"	6:47
2.	"Digital Smoke Signal"	7:09
3.	"Encounters with an Angry God"	5:01
4.	"Samba de Primavera"	5:03

Yawning Man & Fatso Jetson Split (2013)
No.	Title	Length
1.	"Dark Meet" (Yawning Man)	5:21
2.	"Mono Decay" (Fatso Jetson)	4:08
3.	"Trans World Sleep" (Fatso Jetson)	6:44
4.	"Underwater Noise" (Yawning Man)	5:21

=== Live albums ===
Live at Maximum Festival (2016)
No.	Title	Length
1.	"Rock Formations"	5:27
2.	"Far-off Adventure"	7:03
3.	"Perpetual Oyster"	4:22
4.	"Stoney Lonesome"	6:12
5.	"Manolete"	6:16
6.	"Ground Swell"	9:00
7.	"Dark Meet"	6:24
8.	"Ocean Hearts" (OJM bonus track)	7:26

Notes

- Tracks 3 and 4's titles are swapped on the official release.

Live at Giant Rock (2020)
No.	Title	Length
1.	"Tumbleweeds in the Snow"	14:53
2.	"The Last Summer Eye"	8:58
3.	"Nazi Synthesizer"	7:37
4.	"Blowhole Sunrise/Space Finger"	17:38

=== Compilation albums ===
Vista Point (2007)
No.	Title	Length
1.	"Rock Formations"	5:21
2.	"Perpetual Oyster"	5:22
3.	"Stoney Lonesome"	6:02
4.	"Split Tooth Thunder"	2:58
5.	"Sonny Bono Memorial Freeway"	3:52
6.	"Airport Boulevard"	5:22
7.	"Advanced Darkness"	2:33
8.	"She Scares Me"	4:09
9.	"Crater Lake"	3:37
10.	"Buffalo Chips"	4:27
11.	"Manolete"	6:47
12.	"Digital Smoke Signal"	7:09
13.	"Encounters with an Angry God"	5:01
14.	"Samba de Primavera"	5:03

The Birth of Sol (The Demo Tapes) (2009)
No.	Title	Length
1.	"Tuff Dude"	1:08
2.	"Dots, Lines and Mesh"	1:21
3.	"Faith Cakes"	3:22
4.	"Devil's Ladder"	5:05
5.	"Sour Glaze"	1:43
6.	"Kone of Meet"	2:46
7.	"Menso"	1:15
8.	"Sinkhole"	2:49
9.	"SLAB"	5:36
10.	"Fires of Papa's Chile"	2:05
11.	"Saucey and Saggy"	2:29
12.	"Paseo Lindo"	4:07
13.	"Change for a Beggar"	4:57
14.	"Bet I'll Six"	2:19
15.	"Sweet Nugget"	3:04
16.	"Saco"	5:36
17.	"Three Legged Table"	2:39
18.	"Pheasant Under Glass"	4:16
19.	"Catamaran"	2:56
20.	"Deaf Conductor"	9:30
21.	"Crack, Harden, Dry"	3:20
22.	"Friends of Me"	1:54
23.	"The Lonely Rancher"	5:38
24.	"Moroccan Stash"	4:57

=== DVDs ===
Live at W2
No.	Title	Length
1.	"Perpetual Oyster"
2.	"Digital Smoke Signal"
3.	"Rock Formations"
4.	"Stoney Lonesome"
5.	"Split Tooth Thunder"
6.	"Crack, Harden, Dry"
7.	"Manolete"
8.	"Fires of Papa's Chili"
9.	"Advanced Darkness"
10.	"Encounters with an Angry God"
11.	"Buffalo Chips"
12.	"Airport Boulevard"

Notes

- The DVD was released as a bonus disc for the Alone Records release of Rock Formations.
- The concert was filmed at W2 Concertzaal, Den Bosch, Netherlands in 2005.
