= Palm Desert Scene =

Music culture in Southern California

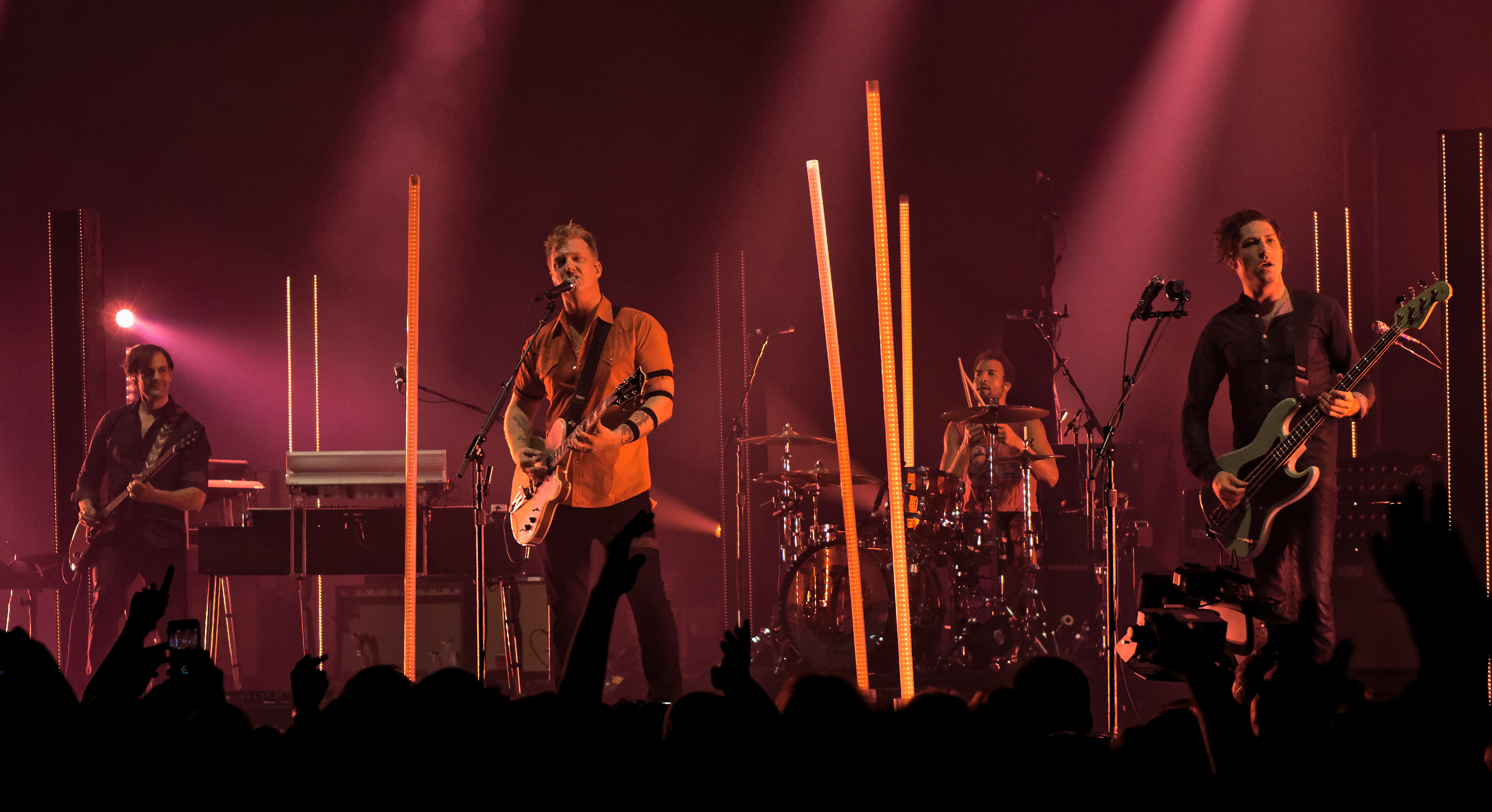
- Queens of the Stone Age performing in London, England, in November 2017
- Stylistic origins: Hard rock; heavy metal; alternative rock; stoner rock; blues rock; psychedelic rock; acid rock; grunge; hardcore punk
- Cultural origins: Early 1990s, Palm Desert, Southern California, U.S.

Other topics
- Sludge metal; doom metal; neo-psychedelia; Paisley Underground

The Palm Desert Scene is a group of related bands and musicians from Palm Desert, California that began in the early 1990s. Their hard rock sound – sometimes described as desert rock – contains elements of heavy metal, psychedelia, blues, punk, alternative, grunge, and other genres. It often features distinctive repetitive drum beats, a propensity for free-form jamming, and "sludgy" or "trance-like" grooves. The involved musicians often play in multiple bands simultaneously, and there is a high rate of collaboration between bands. The term "stoner rock" is sometimes used interchangeably with the term "desert rock". However, not all Palm Desert scene bands are "stoner rock" and not all stoner rock bands sound exactly like those in Palm Desert. Palm Desert has been named by Blender magazine as "one of the top seven rock n' roll cities in America".

== History ==
The scene evolved from various Palm Desert bands' (especially Yawning Man's) marijuana-driven instrumental jam sessions in the desert. It is largely known for its heavy, grinding riffs and association with the use of illicit substances, particularly marijuana, peyote, LSD, and magic mushrooms. These jam sessions inevitably contained some psychedelic rock influences.

Palm Desert bands built a large local following by frequently performing at bars and parties in and around the isolated towns of Southern California's desert areas. The band Kyuss, specifically, performed shows at desert parties known as "generator parties". These shows consisted of small crowds of people partying in the desert, beer drinking, drugs, and the use of gasoline-powered generators to provide electricity for the musical equipment. Kyuss and Queens of the Stone Age member Josh Homme commented that playing in the desert "was the shaping factor for [Kyuss]", noting that "there's no clubs here, so you can only play for free. If people don't like you, they'll tell you. You can't suck."

== The Desert Sessions ==
One project within this scene are the Desert Sessions, in which Josh Homme invites a group of musicians, most of whom are from the Palm Desert scene, to Rancho De La Luna, a studio in the desert, where they write, rehearse and record some 10 songs in one week's time. The songs are recorded and then never played again by the same lineup, though a number of Desert Sessions songs have later been covered on albums by Queens of the Stone Age and become part of the QOTSA live repertoire. The Desert Sessions series has now yielded 12 volumes, which have been released in pairs on CD but individually in 10" vinyl EP format. Though the series is commonly associated with the Palm Desert Scene, not all artists in the scene have participated, and there have been other artists to contribute to the project who are clearly not from the scene, such as John McBain of Red Bank, New Jersey's Monster Magnet, Dean Ween of Pennsylvania's Ween and England's PJ Harvey.

== See also ==
- Stoner rock
- Paisley Underground
- Neo-psychedelia
