= Kyuss discography =

- Studio albums: 4
- Extended plays: 2
- Compilation albums: 2
- Singles: 7
- Music videos: 4

The following is a comprehensive discography of Kyuss, a Southern California-based stoner/desert rock band active between 1988 and 1995 and again since 2010 as Kyuss Lives! During their initial seven-year run, Kyuss had four full-length studio albums, one split album, seven singles, and four music videos. They also released one EP under the name Sons of Kyuss.

This list does not include material performed by members or former members of Kyuss that was recorded with Queens of the Stone Age, Slo Burn, Unida, Hermano, Yawning Man, Mondo Generator, Brant Bjork and the Bros, Eagles of Death Metal, Them Crooked Vultures and Fu Manchu.

== Albums ==
=== Studio albums ===
Title	Details	Peak chart positions		
Title	Details	AUS	GER	UK
Wretch	Released: September 23, 1991; Label: Dali	—	—	—
Blues for the Red Sun	Released: June 30, 1992; Label: Dali	—	—	—
Welcome to Sky Valley	Released: June 28, 1994; Label: Elektra	53	74	—
...And the Circus Leaves Town	Released: July 11, 1995; Label: Elektra	70	45	127

=== Compilation albums ===
Release date	Title	Label	Notes
November 28, 2000	Muchas Gracias: The Best of Kyuss	Elektra Records	Compilation of live tracks and B-sides, released after disbandment.
June 26, 2007	Rhino Hi-Five : Kyuss	Rhino Entertainment	Compilation album, released after disbandment.
April 27, 2018	Green Machine	X5 Music Group	Compilation streaming/download album, released after disbandment.

=== Extended plays ===
Release date	Title	Label	Notes
April 19, 1990	Sons of Kyuss	Black Highway	Recorded and released under the name Sons of Kyuss, many songs would be re-recorded for Wretch.
December 5, 1997	Kyuss/Queens of the Stone Age	Man's Ruin Records	Split release with Queens of the Stone Age, released after disbandment.

=== Tribute album ===
Release date	Title	Label	Notes
February 2004	Listen Without Distraction	Dias de Garage	Includes liner notes by Scott Reeder.

== Singles ==
Year	Title	US rock	AUS	UK	UK rock	Album
1993	"Green Machine"	—	114	—	—	Blues for the Red Sun
1994	"Demon Cleaner"	—	—	78	13	Welcome to Sky Valley
1995	"Gardenia"	—	—	—	—	Welcome to Sky Valley
1995	"One Inch Man"	42	—	—	—	...And the Circus Leaves Town
1996	"Shine!"	—	—	—	—	Non-album single (split single with Wool)
1996	"Into the Void"	—	—	—	—	Non-album single

== Music videos ==
- "Thong Song" (1992)
- "Green Machine" (1992)
- "Demon Cleaner" (1994)
- "One Inch Man" (1995)
