= Muchas Gracias: The Best of Kyuss =

Compilation album by Kyuss
- Released: November 28, 2000
- Recorded: 1991–1995
- Genre: Stoner rock
- Length: 75:13
- Label: Elektra
- Producer: Kyuss, Chris Goss, Catherine Enny, Ron Krown, Hutch

Kyuss chronology
Kyuss / Queens of the Stone Age (1997)	Muchas Gracias: The Best of Kyuss (2000)

Professional ratings
Review scores
Source	Rating
AllMusic	2.5/5 stars
Rolling Stone	2/5 stars

Muchas Gracias: The Best of Kyuss is a compilation album by American stoner rock band Kyuss, released in 2000 through Elektra Records. Although promoted as a "best of" album, it features mostly rare tracks and B-sides and includes only five tracks from the band's four studio albums. The final four tracks are live recordings from a May 24, 1994 performance in Hamburg, previously released as the Live at Marquee Club EP which was included with the first 3,000 copies of the band's 1994 album Welcome to Sky Valley released in Germany and Australia; the tracks were also included on various editions of the "Demon Cleaner" single that same year.

== Track listing ==
Writing credits adapted from the album's liner notes.

No.	Title	Writer(s)	Originally appears on:	Length
1.	"Un Sandpiper"	Josh Homme, Scott Reeder, John Garcia, Alfredo Hernández	"Gardenia" single, 1995	8:16
2.	"Shine"	Reeder	Split single with Wool, 1996	5:55
3.	"50 Million Year Trip (Downside Up)"	Brant Bjork	Blues for the Red Sun, 1992	5:45
4.	"Mudfly"	Homme	"One Inch Man" single, 1995	2:26
5.	"Demon Cleaner"	Homme	Welcome to Sky Valley, 1994	5:20
6.	"A Day Early and a Dollar Extra"	Homme	"One Inch Man" single, 1995	2:17
7.	"I'm Not"	Homme, Garcia	Wretch, 1991	4:30
8.	"Hurricane"	Homme, Garcia	...And the Circus Leaves Town, 1995	2:42
9.	"Flip the Phase"	Homme	"One Inch Man" single, 1995	2:16
10.	"Fatso Forgotso"	Reeder	"Into the Void" single, 1996	8:34
11.	"El Rodeo"	Homme, Garcia	...And the Circus Leaves Town, 1995	5:36
12.	"Gardenia" (live)	Bjork	Live at the Marquee Club, "Demon Cleaner" single, 1994	6:46
13.	"Thumb" (live)	Homme, Bjork	Live at the Marquee Club, "Demon Cleaner" single, 1994	4:38
14.	"Conan Troutman" (live)	Homme	Live at the Marquee Club, "Demon Cleaner" single, 1994	2:18
15.	"Freedom Run" (live)	Homme, Bjork	Live at the Marquee Club, "Demon Cleaner" single, 1994	7:54
Total length:				75:13

Tracks 12–15 recorded May 24, 1994, at the Marquee Club in Hamburg, Germany.

== Personnel ==
Credits adapted from the album's liner notes.

Band

- John Garcia – vocals, producer
- Josh Homme – guitar, producer
- Scott Reeder – bass guitar on tracks 1, 2, 4–6, and 8–15; producer
- Nick Oliveri – bass guitar on tracks 3 and 7; producer
- Alfredo Hernández – drums on tracks 1, 2, 4, 6, and 8–15; producer
- Brant Bjork – drums on tracks 3, 5, and 7; producer

Production

- Niels Anderson – track compiler
- Batterman – track compiler
- Henning Mielke – compilation supervisor
- Chris Goss – producer of tracks 1, 3, and 5
- Catherine Enny – producer of track 7
- Ron Krown – producer of track 7
- Patrick "Hutch" Hutchinson – recording engineer and producer of tracks 12–15
- Der Diener – cover design
- Arne Ketelsen – cover photography
