= Taura (band) =

Argentine alternative rock groups

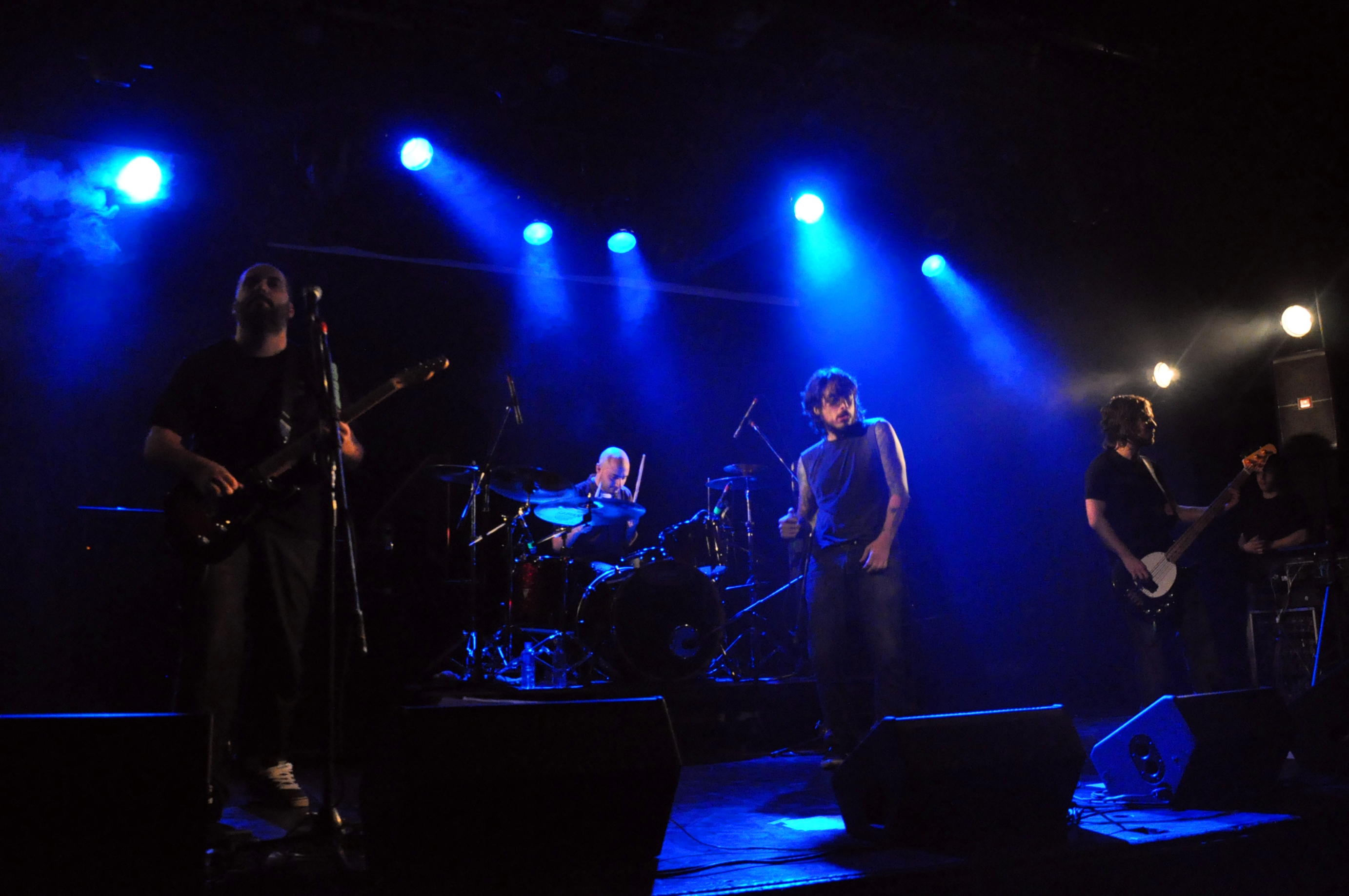
- TAURA live at La Trastienda Club

Background information
- Origin: Buenos Aires, Argentina
- Genres: Alternative rock, Melancholic rock
- Years active: 2000–present
- Label: Pleamar Records
- Members: Alejo García Guraieb; Gabriel Raimondo; Santiago García Ferro; Leonardo Della Bitta
- Website: taurarock.com.ar

Taura is an Argentinian rock band founded in 2000. Its members are Santiago García Ferro, Gabriel "Chaimon" Raimondo, Leonardo Della Bitta and Alejo García Guraieb.

== History ==
=== Beginnings and Taura EP (2000–2004) ===
Taura was formed in 2000 in Buenos Aires after guitar player Santiago García Ferro called Gabriel "Chaimon" Raimondo -former singer of pioneer hardcore act Vrede – to join him in a new project. In that moment the band was completed with Guillermo Houdin on bass and Alfredo Felitte on drums. When Houdin left the band a few months later, Lars Rosenberg- former bass player of Swedish bands Entombed, Therion and Serpent- joined Taura.

After several live performances, in which opening for American rock act Queens of the Stone Age stands out, Rosenberg and Felitte left the band. From that moment on Leonardo Della Bitta on bass and Alejo García Guraieb on drums completed the new lineup. A few months later, Taura released in 2002 its self-titled three-track Ep.

=== Mil Silencios, Aconcagua|Acantilada EP and first European tour (2005–2007) ===
In 2004 Taura recorded a version of the song Writhe for the tribute album to the iconic stoner rock band Kyuss entitled Listen Without Distraction. Further in 2004, the band started recording its first full-length album, Mil Silencios. After a long year of recording, Taura released the album in 2005. Mil Silencios received great reviews on the Argentinian rock press. From that moment on the band began building a faithful fan base. In 2006 the album was re-released by Giboon Records. Taura began 2007 releasing an innovative album: the Aconcagua|AcantiladaEp. The album features four versions of the song Acantilada and four of Aconcagua, with the acoustic versions standing out.

In October that same year, Taura toured Spain for the first time in support of their album Mil Silencios with shows in Madrid, Baracaldo, San Sebastián, Gijón, Santander and Pontevedra.

=== Huésped, second European tour (2008–2010) ===
After the tour, Taura returned to Argentina to close the year with several live performances. In January 2008 they began recording their new record: Huésped. Pelle Henricsson, frequent collaborator of post metal Swedish band Cult of Luna, did the mastering process for the album at his studio in Umeå, Sweden. Huésped was released in October 2008 with several shows in Buenos Aires, Mendoza and Santa Fe. Once again, Taura's second album was very well received by the press. Renowned rock magazines such as Soy Rock and Rolling Stone gave Huésped great reviews. Starting 2009, Taura successfully toured Europe for the second time, this time supporting the record Huésped in Madrid, Baracaldo, Mondragón, Vitoria, San Sebastián, Gijón and Burgos.

=== El Fin del Color (2011–present) ===
In November 2011 Taura released its latest album, El Fin del Color with the label Pleamar Records. This album shows a much compact and complex band. This record features 12 songs and the singles were 200 Días and A Cántaros. In May 2013, Zonda Records released the vinyl, featuring a new cover and also a bonus track: Rick Hunter.

== Members ==
- Alejo García Guraieb – Drums
- Gabriel "Chaimon" Raimondo – Vocals
- Santiago García Ferro – Guitar
- Leonardo Della Bitta – Bass
