= Sky Valley =

Sky Valley may refer to:

- Sky Valley, California
- Sky Valley, Georgia
- Sky Valley Mistress, rock band from Blackburn, Lancashire, England
- Skykomish Valley, also known as Sky Valley
- Welcome to Sky Valley, Kyuss album
