= Green Machine (song) =

Single by Kyuss

from the album Blues for the Red Sun
- Released: 1993
- Recorded: 1992
- Studio: Sound City (Van Nuys, California)
- Genre: Stoner metal; desert rock
- Length: 3:38
- Label: Dali Records
- Songwriter: Brant Bjork
- Producers: Kyuss, Chris Goss

Kyuss singles chronology
"Green Machine" (1993)	"Demon Cleaner" (1994)

Music video
- "Green Machine" on YouTube

"Green Machine" is a song by Kyuss from their 1992 album, Blues for the Red Sun. The song was written by drummer Brant Bjork.

== Music video ==
The video for "Green Machine" features bassist Scott Reeder instead of Nick Oliveri, who left the band shortly after the release of Blues for the Red Sun. Filmed in the desert, an acknowledgement of the desert rock scene of the early 90s, it shows the band performing intercut with scenes of the expansive Californian desert.

== Legacy ==
The back of the CD case contains the following review by Murray Engleheart:

The skyscraping amp inside the CD slick of Blues for the Red Sun—the second meisterwork by Palm Springs, USA natives, Kyuss—just looks loud. It's an image that recalls another era. A time when the battle wasn't to get into the pit but to put your head into one of the bass bins of the PA system. It used to be called fun though it played hell with the pressure in your ears. Maybe the gents in Kyuss used to get up to similar tricks and have set out reproducing those same sounds that pushed them to the brink of passing out. They certainly look like something straight out of a worn promo shot of crazed sixties decibel barbarians, Blue Cheer and sound that almost unbelieveably [sic] at times like a street punk version of the original Black Sabbath. Now let's face it—who doesn't need that. Yep, Kyuss are out to move your head and bowel and make the earth beneath your feet shudder. Mighty noble ideas if you ask me.

Japanese band Greenmachine named themselves after the song.

Dutch musician Bong-Ra sampled the song on his track "Suicide Speed Machine Girl" from his 2006 album Stereohype Heroin Hooker.

In 2006, German band Emil Bulls covered "Green Machine" on their acoustic album The Life Acoustic.

In 2008, American band Pelican debuted their first music video, "Dead Between the Walls". The video was intended as an homage to the "Green Machine" video.

== Accolades ==
Year	Publication	Country	Accolade	Rank
1995	Guitarist	United Kingdom	"The 50 Heaviest Riffs of All Time"	*
2023	Rolling Stone (Australia)	Australia	"The 100 Greatest Heavy Metal Songs of All Time"	44
"*" denotes an unordered list.

== Track listings ==
Australia CD

1. "Green Machine" – 3:38
2. "Thong Song" – 3:47

US promo CD

1. "Green Machine" – 3:38

== Personnel ==
- John Garcia – vocals
- Josh Homme – guitar
- Nick Oliveri – bass
- Brant Bjork – drums
- Chris Goss – producer

== Charts ==
Chart (1993)	Peak position
Australia (ARIA)	114
