= Deep Blue (Louise Patricia Crane album) =

Studio album by Louise Patricia Crane
- Released: 15 May 2020
- Recorded: 2019
- Studio: Stanton Manor Studio, Cambridge
- Genre: Progressive rock; psychedelic rock
- Length: 39:12
- Label: Peculiar Doll Records
- Producer: Stephen Carey

Singles from Deep Blue
- 1. "Deity" Released: 15 December 2019; 2. "Snake Oil" Released: 2 April 2020; 3. "Ophelia" Released: 29 April 2020

Deep Blue is the debut solo album by Northern Irish singer-songwriter Louise Patricia Crane, released on 15 May 2020 by Peculiar Doll Records.

The album project began following the recording of The Eden House's third studio album Songs for the Broken Ones in 2017, in which Crane first met founding member and producer Stephen Carey. For the album, Crane brought in progressive rock veterans Jakko Jakszyk (King Crimson) and Ian Anderson (Jethro Tull), the first time the pair have performed together. The front cover is a photograph taken by Irish artist Jim Fitzpatrick, known for creating album covers for the band Thin Lizzy and his iconic two-tone portrait of Che Guevara created in 1968.

The first single of the album, "Deity", was released on 15 December 2019. The second single, "Snake Oil", featuring Jakko Jakszyk, Ian Anderson and Scott Reeder was released on 2 April 2020. The third single "Ophelia" featuring Jakko Jakszyk and Ian Anderson was released on 29 April 2020.

In the United Kingdom, the album entered the Official Rock & Metal Albums Chart at number 8, and the Official Independent Albums Chart at number 20.

== Production ==
=== Writing and recording ===
In the summer of 2017, following the recording sessions for The Eden House's third studio album Songs for the Broken Ones, Crane wrote a piano-and-vocal lament with musician and producer Stephen Carey that would ultimately become the title track for her debut solo album, "Deep Blue". Enthused by the outcome of the collaboration, Crane relocated to Cambridgeshire from her native Belfast to begin working on the project with Carey at his Stanton Manor studio. Simon Rippin, also of The Eden House, was recruited to provide drums and other percussion.

During the writing process, Crane became obsessed with Victorian era books on botany and floriography – a means of cryptological communication through the use or arrangement of flowers – a theme that would run throughout the record both lyrically and visually. Scott Reeder, formally of American rock band Kyuss, contributed to the album by providing bass and backing vocals for a couple of songs remotely from his home in America.

As writing continued in early 2019, Crane sent the demo "Deity" to her friend, King Crimson guitarist and frontman Jakko Jakszyk, initially for his opinion but upon hearing the track he wished to contribute in some way and so was invited to collaborate, providing his distinctive guitar sound and multi-track vocal harmonies to six of the eight tracks. Recording began in earnest around early summer. Impressed with what he had heard in the studio, Jakszyk brought in multi-instrumentalist Danny Thompson to play Double bass on the closing track of the album, "The Eve Of The Hunter", and uilleann piper John Devine for "Painted World".

It was around this time that Crane was introduced to one of her heroes, Jethro Tull's Ian Anderson, due to a calculated seating arrangement at King Crimson's 50th anniversary residency at the Royal Albert Hall in London that Jakszyk had planned as a joke. The two quickly became friends and arranged to meet again a few months later in Dublin after a Jethro Tull gig that Crane would be attending. By the end of that evening, Anderson was approached by Crane with hopes of him playing flute on her album, to which he agreed. When it came to the point of adding embellishments on the record, Crane turned to German musician and classical composer Shir-Ran Yinon to provide violin on multiple songs.

=== Artworks ===
Early in the creation process for the album Deep Blue, Crane visualised each song as having a corresponding piece of artwork, owing to her chromesthesia – a type of synesthesia in which sound involuntarily evokes an experience of colour. After the completion of the record, Crane stated that she immersed herself in each song as she painted, creating individual abstract pieces for each track. The series of works, also titled Deep Blue, have a botanical theme much like the corresponding album. The series were printed in the form of art cards and were included with the Bandcamp and official website store exclusive vinyl records.

The artwork entitled Deep Blue was used throughout the packaging design of the physical releases of the album. The singles "Snake Oil" and "Ophelia" use their corresponding artworks for their digital releases, although the Ophelia artwork was digitally altered for this purpose.

All of the original artworks were sold as part of eight limited deluxe editions of the album.

== Release ==
For the release of the album, Crane started her own record label, Peculiar Doll Records, with distribution and marketing handled by Bad Omen Records via Plastic Head Music Distribution Ltd.

The album was released on 15 May 2020 on CD (PECUL001CD), 180g black vinyl (PECUL001), Bandcamp/official store exclusive 180g blue vinyl (PECUL001) and on digital platforms.

On 3 August 2020, a Bandcamp/official store exclusive on 180g "Snake Oil" Serpent Green vinyl (PECUL001) was released.

Vinyl records of the album bought through Bandcamp and the official website store included a set of eight exclusive art cards. A limited deluxe edition boxed set of the album, each including one randomly selected original song painting, the 180g black vinyl record and set of signed art cards was also sold via Bandcamp only.

The front cover is a photograph taken by Irish artist Jim Fitzpatrick.

== Critical reception ==
Professional ratings
Review scores
Source	Rating
Classic Rock	7/10
Planet Rock	4/4 stars
Hi-Fi News	90%
Rock Hard	8.5/10

On its release, reviews were full of praise for the album. Prog Magazine said that the album is "Unique, immersive and captivating" adding "this is an exceptional debut", with reviewer Dom Lawson proclaiming "The new queen of psychedelic prog has arrived". HRH Magazine said that "It will transport you on a journey that you just may not want to come back from", and that Crane has "obvious writing and vocal talents".

Internationally the album was well received, with Rock Hard Magazine and Orkus Magazine both giving Deep Blue favourable reviews.

In the United Kingdom, the album entered the Official Rock & Metal Albums Chart at number 8, and the Official Independent Albums Chart at number 20.

At the end of 2020, Deep Blue was chosen as one of Prog Magazine's Critics' Choice Top 20 Albums of the Year, featuring at number 20.

== Track listing ==
All tracks are written by Louise Patricia Crane and Stephen Carey, except where noted.

Sun
No.	Title	Writer(s)	Length
1.	"Deity"		4:00
2.	"Snake Oil"	Simon Rippin, Louise Patricia Crane, Stephen Carey	3:41
3.	"Painted World"		3:50
4.	"Cascading"		5:32

Moon
No.	Title	Length
5.	"Deep Blue"	4:18
6.	"Ophelia"	4:48
7.	"Isolde"	5:58
8.	"The Eve Of The Hunter"	5:43

== Personnel ==
- Louise Patricia Crane – vocals, artwork
- Ian Anderson – flute (2,6)
- Stephen Carey – electric guitar (1,2,4–8), acoustic guitar (3), bass guitar (1,4,8), piano (5), keyboards (2,7,8), production, mixing
- John Devine – uilleann pipes (3)
- Jim Fitzpatrick – Cover photo
- Steve Gibbons – fretless bass (6,7), bass guitar (6)
- Jakko Jakszyk – backing vocals (1,2,4,6,8), electric guitar (2–4), sitar (2), acoustic guitar (3), low whistle (6)
- Scott Reeder – bass guitar (2,3), backing vocals (3)
- Simon Rippin – percussion (1,2,4,6–8)
- Phil Smee – Layout
- Danny Thompson – upright bass (8)
- Shir-Ran Yinon – violin (5–7), viola (5)
- Gordon Young – mastering

== Chart performance ==
Country	Chart (2020)	Peak position
United Kingdom	Official Rock & Metal Albums Chart	8
United Kingdom	Official Independent Albums Chart	20
