= Dali's Llama =

American band

Dali's Llama is an American band formed in 1993 by Zach Huskey and his wife, Erica. The band is primarily a desert rock / stoner rock band but over the years, it has ventured into doom, punk rock, experimental, and garage rock. The Huskeys also started their own record label called Dali's Llama Records and have released thirteen Dali's Llama albums and two EPs, in addition to numerous side projects and solo albums.

== Before Dali's Llama ==
Zach Huskey's early bands were The Sciotics (with Sean Wheeler), Blue Sunday, Cloudy Daze and The Next. All featured Tony Brown Diprima from Unsound on drums. Huskey's garage-psychedelic bands in the 1980s are considered by some to be influential in what later became known as the original desert rock music scene.

In 1986, Huskey moved to Los Angeles, where he formed the band Long, Dead and Gone. Occasionally, the band traveled back to the desert to play a club or a generator party. When Long, Dead and Gone disbanded, Huskey formed a heavy down-tuned rock band called My Pain, which opened shows for bands such as Wool, White Zombie, Rage Against The Machine, The Obsessed, etc. When My Pain disbanded, Huskey returned to the desert.

== Band history ==
In 1993, Zach and Erica Huskey formed Dali's Llama, created Dali's Llama Records and self-released the band's first album, Pre Post Now. Bruce Fessier of The Desert Sun said, "Zach Huskey has been an integral player on the desert rock scene since the days of the generator parties in the late 1980s and early 1990s. His tuned-down guitar sounds epitomize desert rock as surely as the music of Kyuss, Fatso Jetson and House of Broken Promises..."

The following year, Dali's Llama released their second album entitled Creative Space. The song "Listen" was later featured in the 2010 movie I'm Not Like That No More featuring Paul Rodriguez and Felipe Esparanza. The band's lineup for both of these early albums was Zach Huskey (songwriter/vocals/guitar), Erica Huskey (bass) and Johnnie Moreno (drums).

In 1994, Ian Dye replaced Johnnie Moreno on drums. In 1995, Dali's Llama released a third album, Being. Both “Creative Space” and “Being” were produced by Steve Kravac and recorded at West Beach Recorders, Los Angeles, the studio owned by Brett Gurewitz of Bad Religion.

After Being, Huskey took the band artistically in a different direction. He wrote songs using elements of his avant-garde compositions. The band had a new drummer, George Rubacava and a second guitar player, Eric Overton. The new experimental improvisational songs were recorded live at a rehearsal in 1995 but were not released until 2001 on The Color Of Apples album.

In 2005, after pursuing other projects (including Primordial Blues) and solo projects, Dali's Llama released a fifth album, Chordata, with drummer Robin Clewell and second guitarist, Josh Roell.

Alfredo Hernandez said, "Way before Kyuss or Queens of the Stone Age, Dali’s Llama frontman Zach Huskey was a musician to be reckoned with. Today’s Dali’s Llama are punchy, powerful and to the point. Dali’s Llama is one of the best desert rock bands today and the best live desert rock band around!"

In 2006, Huskey wrote some tuned down, heavy, slow, and sludgy songs, which became Dali Llama's sixth album, Sweet Sludge, recorded at The Sanctuary and produced by Scott Reeder (Kyuss, The Obsessed, etc.).

Scott Reeder said, "They were out here a few weeks ago - tracked and mixed it in only four days! It was good to hang out again with my old pal Zach Huskey, who’s been a stalwart of the desert music scene since our high school days together. Along with his wife/bassist Erica and drummer Robin, Dali’s Llama have been working hard - hardcore DIY, and in it for all the right reasons - for the pure joy of making music. Zach’s always-thought-inspiring lyrics, coupled with epic song structures, are tossed off as if it’s no big deal. After a few listens, a deep appreciation develops for the love that goes into what they do together."

Around this time Dali's Llama performed with Fatso Jetson, Dixie Witch, Sasquatch, House of Broken Promises, SuperGiant, Floating Goat, etc., and they played the Stoner Hands of Doom Festival (SHoD VIII) in Mesa, Arizona.

Dali's Llama's seventh album, Full on Dunes presented heavier, thicker, and faster songs. It blended the band's desert punk and heavy rock roots. Jeff Howe, drummer, joined the band. Some of the Huskeys' high school friends performed as guests on the album. They included Mario Lalli (Fatso Jetson, Yawning Man and Desert Sessions), Sean Wheeler (Throw Rag, Sun Trash and Charley Horse), Joe Dillon (from Hot Beat Pussy Fiend) and Scott Reeder. Mike Frame said, "Here is another album full of top-notch stoner/desert rock from this great band. This is some of the best of this style in a decade!"

The band's next album was Raw is Real. Joe Dillon joined the band full-time as a second guitarist. Again, the album was recorded at The Sanctuary with Scott Reeder. This album had a darker, heavier and angrier sound. The Obelisk website commented, "Raw is Real definitely lives up to its name, more ideologically than sonically. It sounds clean but there is a cynical bite to the lyrics of songs like Theocracy and the punkish Grump that, political or not, adds thematic heft."

The band's 2010 album, Howl Do You Do? was a lighthearted detour for the band with a live unpolished sixties psychedelia sound. It incorporated a garage element with raw blues. A new drummer, Craig Brown joined the band and Mikael Jacobson, also the producer, played the organ. It was recorded at Audio Grande studios. Jay Snider said, "Nothing wrong with a little trip to the chemistry lab! "Howl do you do?" is an experiment that works. Not as much of a departure from the band's sound as I expected (riffs are still the trail boss on this wagon train), but the quicker, catchier song structures, heavy organ interplay, and the more jammed-out feel of the material sure do show another side to Dali's Llama."

In 2012, Dali’s Llama released the album Autumn Woods with influences from doom metal. Joe Wangler, a new second guitarist joined the band. This album was recorded in two and a half days at The Sanctuary. Scott Reeder again engineered and produced the album. Ed and Sally on Doommantia website commented, "After so many years together and with so much music recorded already, it is remarkable that Dali's Llama have still yet to make a wrong turn in their recording career."

Celebrating 20 years together, Dali's Llama released an anthology of some of their better known songs up to that point. "...it is a lovingly curated eight song LP that represents the last five years of the band... Although this isn't the lavish, career-spanning box set the band deserves, Twenty Years Underground gives you a tantalizing taste of power and majesty that is Dali's Llama. It will leave you wanting more." - Eleni P. Austin, Coachella Valley Weekly

In 2016, Dali's Llama released their twelfth album "Dying In The Sun", which had Joe Dillon rejoin the band, this time on keyboards. "...they continue to crank out fantastic heavy music. They don’t try to be “scary” or to be “tough,” they just blast out cool, heavy riffs with excellent vocals..." – Mike Frame, Razorcake

Dali's Llama followed up with "The Blossom E.P." in 2018, a bluesy, three song release."...Dali’s Llama may remain the desert’s best kept secret when it comes to songwriting, but like they do, they’ll keep moving forward anyway, and while parts of “Longtime Woman” and “Like I Do” feel like they're playing to the band's strengths, the jammier feel also shows the chemistry the four-piece have developed over their time with this lineup around Zach and Erica..." - The Obelisk

In 2019, Dali's Llama released the album "Mercury Sea", which featured the single/video "Weary".

The "Dune Lung EP" was released in 2021. "...It’s only four tracks; but those four tracks will give you the perfect amount of that heavy goodness you all went out into the desert for in the first place. No exaggeration. None at all. Dune Lung EP is everything you love about the desert. It is the desert..." – JK, Stoner HiVe

== Credits and testimonials ==
Dali's Llama was credited and thanked in the John Srebalus film Such Hawks, Such Hounds (2008).

Eleni P. Austin wrote in the Coachella Valley Weekly, "If someone were to erect a shrine to the founders of the Desert Rock scene, an imposing Mount Rushmore-style monument, the four faces would have to be Mario Lalli, Herb Lineau, Sean Wheeler and Zach Huskey. Other Desert musicians have received more recognition and achieved more notoriety, but these guys were the originators, the pioneers."

In 2014, at the Coachella Valley Music Awards, Bruce Fessier wrote, "Special Trailblazer Awards were presented to two bands that came out of the generator scene and remain relevant. Zach and Erica Huskey of Dali’s Llama have self-recorded 20 albums. Unsound recently packed Schmidy’s Tavern despite a rare-for-this-desert $15 cover charge"

== Discography ==
=== Albums ===
- Pre Post Now - 1993
- Creative Space - 1994
- Being - 1995
- The Color of Apples - 2001
- Chordata - 2006
- Sweet Sludge - 2007
- Full on Dunes - 2008
- Raw is Real - 2009
- How Do You Do - 2010
- Autumn Woods - 2012
- Twenty Years Underground - 2013
- Dying in the Sun - 2016
- The Blossom EP - 2018
- Mercury Sea - 2019
- Dune Lung EP - 2021
- Star Resistant - 2023

=== Compilations ===
- StonerRock Compilation 8
- Lollipop's Fall 2009 mp3

== Filmography ==
=== Music documentaries ===
- Such Hawks, Such Hounds by John Srebalus (2008), in which they were credited and thanked
- Lo Sound Desert by Jörg Steineck

=== Movie soundtracks ===
- Shoot the Hero directed by Christian Sesma (starring Jason Mewes and Danny Trejo) (2010)
- I’m Not Like That No More directed by Christian Sesma (starring Felipe Esparza and Paul Rodriguez) (2010)
- The Night Crew directed by Christian Sesma (starring Luke Goss, Danny Trejo, Jason Mewes) (2015)
- Lo Sound Desert directed by Jörg Steineck (2016)

=== Internet series ===
- Vigilante Diaries (2013)

== Festivals ==
- Stoner Hands of Doom Festival (SHoD VIII), Mesa, Arizona
- Hellride Festival, Yucaipa, California
- Summer Spell, Fullerton, California
- 420 Fest, Fullerton, California
- Lo Sound Desert, Indio, California
- Doom in June III, Las Vegas, Nevada

== Awards ==
- CV Weekly's Trailblazer Award (2014)

== Line-up ==
=== Current ===
- Zach Huskey - guitar and vocals (1993–present)
- Erica Huskey - bass (1993–present)
- Craig Brown - drums (2009–present)
- Joe Dillon - guitar (2008–2010), guitar, backing vocals, keyboards (2014–present)

=== Former ===
- Johnnie Moreno - drums (1993–1994)
- Ian Dye - drums (1994–1995)
- Eric Overton - guitar (1995–1996)
- George Rubacava - drums (1995–1996)
- Robin Clewell - drums and vocals (2005–2007)
- Josh Roell - guitar (2005–2006)
- Jeff Howe - drums (2007–2009)
- Trent Ramseyer - drums (2009)
- Michael Whitehead - guitar (2010)
- Joe Wangler - guitar (2011–2018)

=== Guest appearances ===
- Scott Reeder - bass and background vocals (Full On Dunes)
- Mario Lalli - guitar and background vocals (Full On Dunes)
- Sean Wheeler - background vocals (Full On Dunes)
- Mikael Jacobson - organ (Howl Do You Do?)
