= The Black Path (album) =

Studio album by Emil Bulls
- Released: April 4, 2008
- Recorded: December 13, 2007 – February 2, 2008 at Horus Sound Studio, Hannover, Germany; Butterfly Studio, Mülheim an der Ruhr, Germany
- Genre: Alternative metal
- Label: Drakkar Records/Sony BMG
- Producer: Benny Richter

Emil Bulls chronology
The Life Acoustic (2007)	The Black Path (2008)	Phoenix (2009)

Professional ratings
Review scores
Source	Rating
Hard Wired	6/10
Laut.de	3/5 stars
Plattentests.de	5/10
Rock Hard	7/10

The Black Path is the fourth major studio album by the German band Emil Bulls, released on April 4, 2008. The first single from the record is "The Most Evil Spell", released on March 7, 2008. The Black Path was the first album released by the group without longtime collaborator and former band member Paul Rzyttka (DJ Zamzoe).

== Recording session ==
On Saturday December 13, 2007, the band entered the Horus-Sound Studio with 17 demo tracks previously written in a two weeks span at an isolated camp in Nesselwang, Bavaria. With producer Benny Richter, who had produced records for bands such as Caliban and Krypteria, the band sought a heavier sound than their previous album The Southern Comfort. It was engineered and mixed by close friend of the band, Jakob Bernhart, the man behind the console on The Life Acoustic. The final mix was completed on February 2, 2008, at around 4:40AM local time.

Soon after recording the album, the band announced that they had signed with major label Sony BMG/Drakkar for its release.

=== Nesselwang's demo track titles ===
On December 9, 2007, the band posted several tentative track titles on its recording session blog:

- "Hit"
- "Schutzmann"
- "Robennkot"
- "Pure Anger"
- "Waiting in Niederbayern"
- "To End All Wars"
- "Variax"
- "Kill Em All"
- "Feel It"
- "Schweremut"

== Track listing ==
All songs and lyrics written by Emil Bulls.

1. "The Black Path (Intro)" – 0:28
2. "To End All Wars" – 2:38
3. "The Most Evil Spell" – 2:55
4. "All In Tune With The Universe" – 3:55
5. "Pledge Allegiance To The Damned (The Unseen One)" – 4:24
6. "Wolfsstunde" – 4:40
7. "Nothingness" – 4:34
8. "Collapsed Memorials" – 3:25
9. "Close To The Wind" – 3:32
10. "Worlds Apart" – 3:32
11. "Pure Anger (The Hex)" – 5:23
12. "10050" – 3:18
13. "Cigarette Scars" – 3:26
14. "Glad To Be With You Again" – 19:50

=== Tour edition ===
15. "All In Tune With The Universe (live)" – 4:15
16. "Symphony Of Destruction (live, Megadeth Cover)" – 4:19
17. "Worlds Apart (live)" – 3:48

== Personnel ==
- Christoph von Freydorf – vocals, guitar
- James Richardson – bass guitar
- Stephan "Moik" Karl – guitar
- Fabian "Fab" Fuess – drums
- Christian Schneider – guitar, vocals (on "10050") • (credited as Chrissy Schneider)
- DJ Butterfly Cuts - vocals (on "10050")
- Benny Richter - producer, pianos, keyboards, vocals (on "10050")
- Jakob Bernhart – sound engineer, mixer (credited as Jakob "JDawg" Bernhart)
- Toni Meloni – editing
- Klaus Scheuermann – mastering
- Severin Schweiger – photography
- KOMA-Grafik – artwork
