= Jim Fitzpatrick (artist) =

Irish artist

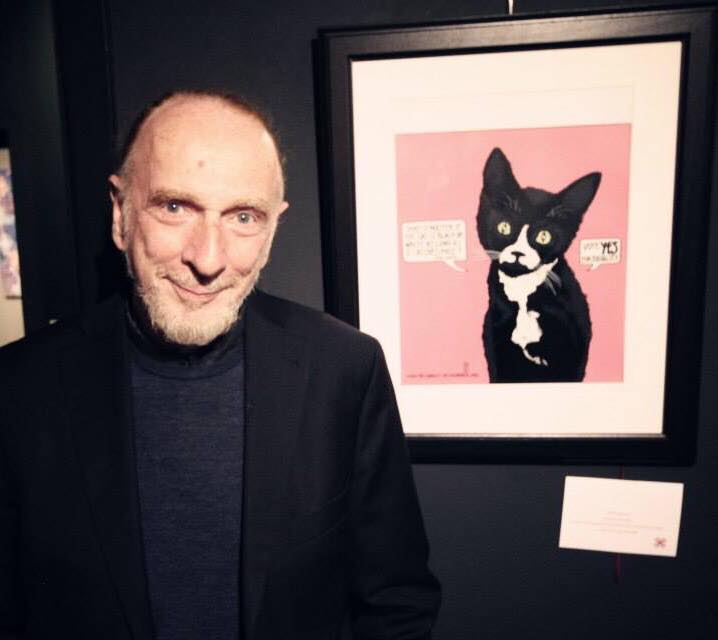
- Fitzpatrick in front of his work Elroy for Equality at the exhibition Making Out in GalleryX 2015
- Born: 29 December 1944 (age 81); Dublin, Ireland
- Known for: Stylised Celtic artwork
- Notable work: Portrait of Che Guevara (1968)
- Website: https://www.jimfitzpatrick.com/

Jim Fitzpatrick (born 1944) is an Irish artist. He is best known for elaborately detailed work inspired by the Irish Celtic artistic tradition. However, his most famous single piece is a two-tone portrait of Che Guevara created in 1968, based on a photo by Alberto Korda.

== Early life ==
Jim Fitzpatrick was born in December 1944 to James and Elizabeth Fitzpatrick (née O'Connor). His parents had married in the north Dublin suburb of Cabra in June 1943. During a period of childhood sickness with pleurisy, Fitzpatrick read and drew in bed, as well as his mother and great-aunt telling him stories of the Tuatha Dé Danann, Cú Chulainn and Fionn MacCumhaill. He was educated at the Franciscan College Gormanston, County Meath, just north of Dublin. His father was a photo-journalist and he is a grandson of political cartoonist Thomas Fitzpatrick.

== Career ==
Portrait of Che Guevara (1968)

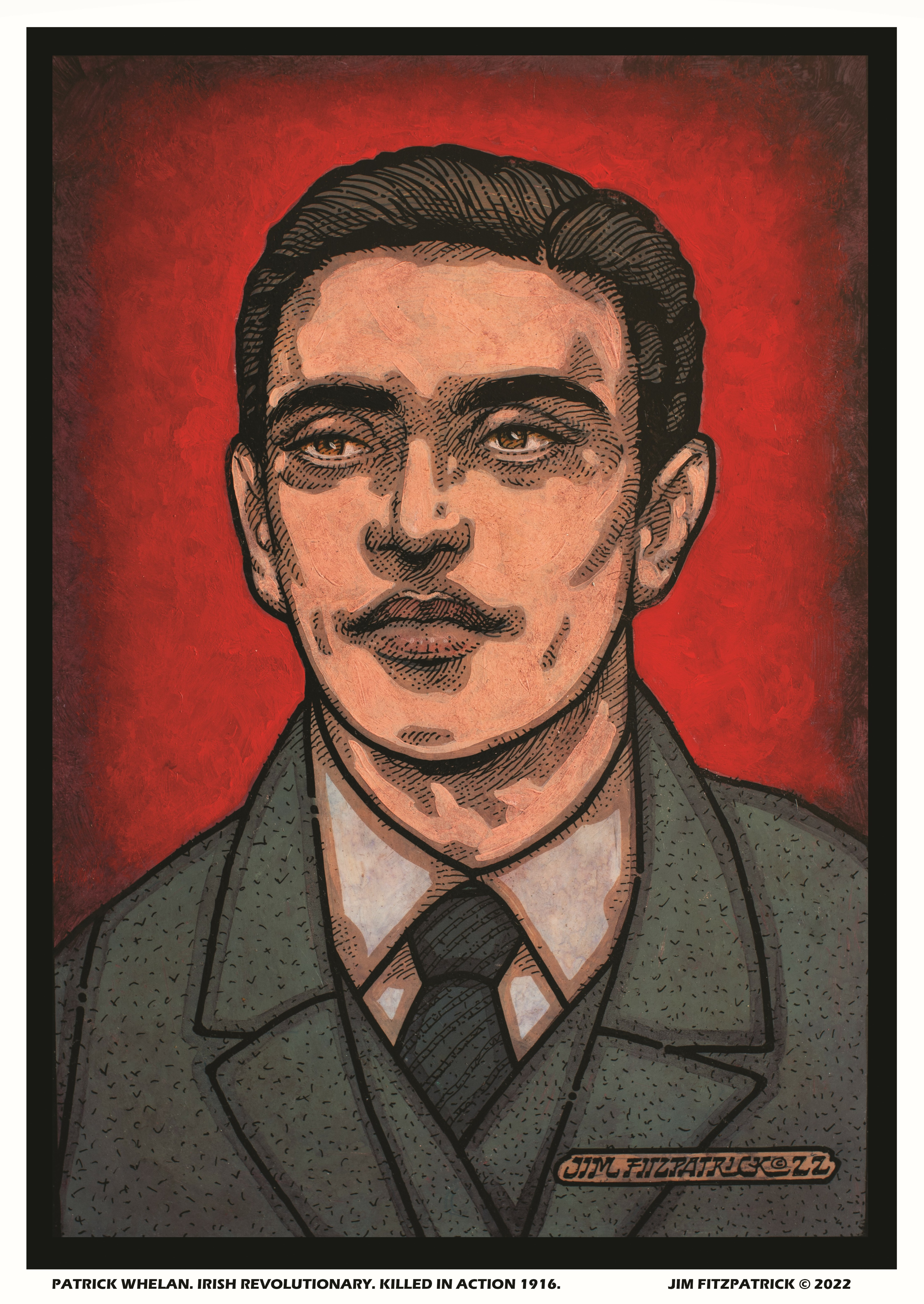
Portrait of Patrick Whelan (2022)

Fitzpatrick's earliest work was the graphic portrait of Che Guevara, which was based on the photograph by Alberto Korda, entitled Guerrillero Heroico, was taken on 5 March 1960. Fitzpatrick met Guevara 5 years earlier in Kilkee during Guevara's visit to trace his Irish ancestry. Having initially tried to distribute the poster himself, Fitzpatrick chose to remove copyright from the image so that it could be used freely by left wing groups, stating that "I literally wanted it to breed like rabbits. I wanted it to spread."

In 1978, he wrote and illustrated a book called The Book of Conquests, the retelling of a cycle of Irish myths, the Lebor Gabála Érenn. The book is a retelling of the legends of the coming of the Tuatha dé Dannan to Ireland and their fight with the Fir Bolg. The illustrations include intricate Celtic scroll work and knotwork, for which Fitzpatrick has become known. A second book, The Silver Arm, is based on the deeds of Nuada of the Silver Arm and Lugh in their fight with the Formor.

Fitzpatrick has produced artwork for bands such as Thin Lizzy, providing the portraits of the band for their Vagabonds of the Western World album, then going on to illustrate the logo for 1975 album Fighting (frequently displayed onstage thereafter and used on compilation albums and merchandise) and their Jailbreak album in 1976, for Sinéad O'Connor's 2000 album Faith and Courage, for The Darkness' 2003 single "Christmas Time (Don't Let the Bells End)", Norwegian black metal band Darkthrone's 2013 album cover The Underground Resistance, and took the photograph for the cover of Louise Patricia Crane's 2020 album Deep Blue. He was commissioned by CityJet in 2007 to create images reflecting Ireland's culture, mythology, history and landscapes.

In 2011, Fitzpatrick announced that he intended to copyright the iconic red and black Che Guevara graphic. He cited "crass commercial" use of the image for his decision and planned to hand over the copyright and all rights, in perpetuity, to the family of Guevara in Cuba. The image remains available for free through Fitzpatrick's website for non-commercial usage. An Post released a stamp featuring Fitzpatrick's image of Guevara in 2017 to mark 50 years since its publication.

In June 2023, Fitzpatrick released Ancient Ireland, Land of Legend, his first portfolio in 40 years.

== Meeting Guevara in Ireland ==
According to Fitzpatrick, in 1963 while a teenage student at Gormanston College he worked a summer job at the Marine Hotel pub in Kilkee, the town of his mother's birth. One morning Che Guevara walked in with two Cubans. He asked Fitzpatrick what he should drink, and was recommended an Irish whiskey with water. Fitzpatrick immediately recognized him because of his interest in the Cuban Revolution. Knowing about the Irish diaspora and history in Argentina, Fitzpatrick asked Che vaguely about his roots. Che told Fitzpatrick that his grandmother was Irish and that his great-grandmother, Isabel, was from Galway, with other family being from County Cork.

"I am in this green Ireland of your ancestors. When they found out, the television station came to ask me about the Lynch genealogy, but in case they were horse thieves or something like that, I didn't say much."

— Che Guevara, jokingly in a letter to his father

Guevara's father also bore the Norman-Irish surname "Lynch." Fitzpatrick describes Che as "curious" about Ireland "from a revolutionary point of view" and remarks that Che proclaimed his "great admiration" for the fact that, in his view, Ireland was the first country to "shake off the shackles of the British Empire". Apparently Che was stranded on an overnight flight from Moscow to Cuba and had touched down at Shannon Airport, where the Soviet airline Aeroflot had a refueling base. Unable to depart because of thick fog, Che and his accompanying Cubans took the day off for an "unofficial" visit. It was this experience, according to Fitzpatrick, that gave him the impetus to follow the future actions of Che, including his ill-fated mission to Bolivia.

In December 2008, Jim Fitzpatrick, along with local historian Anne Holliday and the Shannon Development, announced plans to commemorate Guevara's visit to Ireland, and specifically his time spent in Limerick. Early plans are focused on an exhibition of Guevara's visit at the City Museum, followed by the creation of a "permanent mark" symbolizing his time spent at Hanratty Hotel's – White House pub in Shannonside. Fitzpatrick explained the initiative by remarking "we want to commemorate the fact Che Guevara spent some very important hours of his life here … this probably was Che's last hurrah."

== Personal life ==
Fitzpatrick was partnered and married to Deirdre for over twenty years; they later divorced. Fitzpatrick has lived on the Burrow Road in Sutton on the Howth peninsula since the 1970s, in an apartment which later became his studio, in a converted schoolmasters' house, and then back in the apartment. The Fitzpatricks had three children, two of whom are in business with the artist. His younger son, Redmond, issues prints of Fitzpatrick's work from California, while his daughter has produced a line of scarves, Lile, named for his grandmother and printed with his artwork.

== Selected works ==
=== Books ===
- The Book of Conquests 1978 p/b ISBN 0-525-47511-7, 1991 p/b ISBN 0-905895-14-2
- The Silver Arm (1981) ISBN 1-85028-081-9
- The Children of Lir (with Michael Scott) (1992) ISBN 0-7497-0888-3
- Erinsaga. The Mythological Paintings of Jim FitzPatrick

=== Design ===
- Celtworld

=== Portfolios ===
- Celtia (1975)
- The Book of Conquests (1984)
- Ancient Ireland, Land of Legend (2023)

== See also ==
- Irish art
