= Monogamy (disambiguation) =

Monogamy is a human relationship where an individual has only one partner.

Monogamy may also refer to:

- Monogamy in animals, a similar concept in animals
- Monogamy (album), by Emil Bulls, 2000
- Monogamy (film), 2010
- Monogamy (TV series), an American television series that premiered in 2018
- "Monogamy", a song by Tim Kasher from the 2010 album The Game of Monogamy
- "Monogamy", a song by Christopher from the 2018 album Under the Surface
