= The Life Acoustic =

The Life Acoustic may refer to:

- The Life Acoustic (Everlast album)
- The Life Acoustic (Emil Bulls album)
