= The Life Acoustic (Emil Bulls album) =

Live album by Emil Bulls
- Released: February 23, 2007
- Recorded: July 21, 2006 at 1200 Jahre Pullach in Munich, Germany
- Genre: Acoustic, Alternative metal
- Length: 54:56
- Label: Oh My Sweet Records
- Producer: Jakob Bernhart

Emil Bulls chronology
The Southern Comfort (2005)	The Life Acoustic (2007)	The Black Path (2008)

The Life Acoustic is an acoustic live album by the German alternative metal band Emil Bulls, released on February 23, 2007. It was recorded at a show in Munich on July 21, 2006.

== Track listing ==
All lyrics written by Christoph von Freydorf, except "Green Machine" written by Brant Bjork for the band Kyuss. Additional lyrics on "Style School" by Paul Rzyttka.

1. "Bachham" (Christoph von Freydorf, James Richardson, Fabian Fuess, Stephan Karl, Christian Schneider, Paul Rzyttka) - 4:05
2. "Revenge" (von Freydorf, Richardson, Fuess, Karl, Schneider, Rzyttka) - 4:35
3. "Magnificent Lies" (Richardson) - 3:21
4. "Cocoon" (von Freydorf, Richardson, Stefan Finauer, Karl, Schneider, Rzyttka) - 4:42
5. "These Are The Days" (von Freydorf, Richardson, Fuess, Karl, Schneider, Rzyttka) - 3:56
6. "Leaving You With This" (von Freydorf, Richardson, Finauer, Karl, Schneider, Rzyttka) - 3:35
7. "At Fleischberg's" (von Freydorf, Richardson, Fuess, Karl, Schneider, Rzyttka) - 3:34
8. "Style School" (von Freydorf, Richardson, Finauer, Karl, Schneider, Rzyttka) - 3:59
9. "Mongoose" (von Freydorf) - 4:54
10. "Green Machine" (Brant Bjork) - 3:44
11. "Monogamy" (von Freydorf, Richardson, Finauer, Karl, Schneider, Rzyttka) - 5:43
12. "Newborn" (von Freydorf) - 3:55
13. "Smells Like Rock'n'Roll" (von Freydorf, Richardson, Finauer, Karl, Schneider, Rzyttka) - 4:53

== Personnel ==
- Christoph von Freydorf – vocals, guitar
- James Richardson – bass (credited as Citnoh)
- Fabian Fuess – drums (credited as Don Fabuloso)
- Stephan Karl – guitar (credited as M-Oikal)
- Christian Schneider – guitar (credited as Ricky Glam)
- Beatbox Eliot – beatbox (on "Smells Like Rock'N'Roll")
- Felix Antreich - additional percussion
- Jakob Bernhart – producer, mixer (credited as "JDawg" Jakob Bernhart)
- Klaus Scheuermann – mastering
- Franz Wickenhãuser – photography
- Rashana – artwork
