= Luna Mausoleum =

Studio album by Sky Valley Mistress
- Released: 23 January 2026
- Studio: The Nave (Leeds, England); Namouche (Lisbon, Portugal); The Wood Rooms (Salford, England)
- Genre: Blues rock; desert rock
- Length: 41:49
- Label: New Heavy Sounds
- Producer: Joe Fossard

Sky Valley Mistress chronology
Acoustic Session E.P. (2021)	Luna Mausoleum (2026)

Singles from Luna Mausoleum
- 1. "Too Many Ghosts" Released: 28 March 2025; 2. "Thundertaker" Released: 26 September 2025

Luna Mausoleum is the second studio album by English rock duo Sky Valley Mistress, released on 23 January 2026 via New Heavy Sounds and produced by Joe Fossard. Preceded by the singles "Too Many Ghosts" and "Thundertaker" in 2025, it is their first album as a duo, following their debut album Faithless Rituals from 2020.

The record has been described as a blues rock and desert rock album. It received mostly positive reviews, with critics highlighting the duo's musicianship and the catchiness of the riffs and choruses; much of the more negative criticism it received was aimed at the long length of some of its songs. Luna Mausoleum peaked on the UK Independent Albums Chart at no. 30.

== Background and recording ==
When the band's debut studio album Faithless Rituals was released in March 2020, they were heavily affected by the concurrent nationwide lockdowns that resulted from the COVID-19 pandemic, prohibiting them from touring to promote the record. Since then, the band's lineup was reduced to the duo of Kayley "Hell Kitten" Davies and Max "Leather Messiah" Newsome. While both play instruments during their live performances, only Newsome provided the instrumentals in the studio between the two of them. The pair have stated that Luna Mausoleum is the soundtrack to them driving their hearse—which they tour in—to the Moon. It was recorded at The Nave and Namouche Studios, with brass and strings recorded at The Wood Rooms Studio.

== Composition ==
The music in Luna Mausoleum has been characterised as blues rock and desert rock. Sputnikmusic staff member Caleb Robinson compared the album to certain rock bands from the 2000s, such as Queens of the Stone Age, the Black Keys, and the White Stripes. After a brief introductory piece, a guitar solo begins "The Exit List", then is followed by the bass-driven "Too Many Ghosts". "House of the Moon" includes a minute-long conclusion consisting of a string section, performed by the Up North Orchestra. At about nine-and-a-half minutes long, the closer "Blue Desert II" begins slowly, then about halfway through, it increases tempo and crescendos until it slows back down to a climax with a guitar solo and drum fills.

== Promotion and singles ==
On 28 March 2025, Sky Valley Mistress released the single "Too Many Ghosts", which was accompanied with a lyric video. It was the band's first release since 2020's Faithless Rituals. Then on 26 September, they announced the album and released their second single "Thundertaker", named after their hearse. In October, the duo embarked on The Thundertaker World Tour in the UK, beginning on the 2nd at the Black Heart in London and ending on the 25th at The Lighthouse in Kent. The official music video for "Too Many Ghosts", starring the duo and their hearse, followed on 9 January 2026.

== Release ==
Luna Mausoleum was released on 23 January 2026 by New Heavy Records, roughly six years after their previous record. It peaked on the UK Independent Albums Chart at no. 30.

== Critical reception ==
Professional ratings
Review scores
Source	Rating
The Arts Desk	4/5 stars
Classic Rock	8/10
Distorted Sound	7/10
Sputnikmusic	3.75/5

Writing for Classic Rock magazine, Julian Marszalek gave the album an 8 out of 10, opining that by revising their lineup, the band "sharpened their vision" and gained a "renewed purpose and confidence", ultimately creating a record that sounds unique whilst remaining musically rooted in their desert rock origins. In a four-star review for The Arts Desk, Thomas H. Green said Luna Mausoleum retains the heaviness of their earlier work and also provides "an invigorating leap forward" in their sound and songwriting. Speaking of the lyrics, Green found them to be mostly "adequate rather than central" but added that by the time it finishes, the album makes up for it overall.

In a 3.75 out of 5 review for the website Sputnikmusic, staff reviewer Caleb Robinson complimented Newsome's "catchy" guitar riffs and Davies' vocal delivery for knowing when to provide the appropriate amount of grittiness, softness, or emotion as the music demands. As criticisms, Robinson thought that some songs were too long and that the album stuck too much to a similar musical structure throughout. Itay Gilad of Distorted Sound rated it 7 out of 10 and highlighted the quality of the instrumentation and the catchiness of the choruses; their main critiques were that it felt occasionally inconsistent and that a few of the songs felt too lengthy to be fully impactful.

== Track listing ==
All tracks are written by Sky Valley Mistress.

Luna Mausoleum track listing
No.	Title	Length
1.	"An Eagle's Epitaph"	0:40
2.	"The Exit List"	4:26
3.	"Too Many Ghosts"	3:25
4.	"No Sleep"	4:43
5.	"House of the Moon"	5:57
6.	"Live Past Life"	4:16
7.	"White Night"	5:03
8.	"Thundertaker"	3:51
9.	"Blue Desert II"	9:24
Total length:		41:49

== Personnel ==
Credits are adapted from the CD liner notes, except where noted.

=== Sky Valley Mistress ===
- Kayley "Hell Kitten" Davies – vocals
- Max "Leather Messiah" Newsome – instrumentals, string arrangements

=== Additional musicians ===
- Up North Orchestra (Jenny Cox, Simon Denton, Conall Gormley, Natalie Purton, Paula Smart, Alistair Vennart) – strings and brass at The Wood Rooms Studio
- Gregory Harper – string arrangements
- Ian Hodgson – backing vocals (3)
- Andrew Woodhouse – guitar solo #1 (5)
- Liam Meers – backing vocals (6)
- Suse Ribeiro – vibraphone (7, 8)
- Callum Jonathan Squire Williams – guitar solo #1 (7)
- Joe Fossard – "voice-inside-your-head" (8)
- Gold Thing – organ (9)

=== Technical and design ===
- Joe Fossard – production, mixing
- Dan Blackburn, Andy Hawkins – engineering at The Nave
- Miguel Peixoto – engineering at Namouche
- Graeme Lynch – mastering
- Sky Valley Mistress – model concept, design, and art direction
- Chris Monaghan of Eaten Alive Illustrations – model and front cover illustrations
- Leather Messiah Design Co. – packaging and sleeve design
- Devon Rea – packaging and sleeve design assistance
- Jack Bolton – photography
- Bethany Davies – photography assistance
- Mick Greenwood, Danny Casson – hearsecraft mechanics

== Charts ==
Chart performance for Luna Mausoleum
Chart (2026)	Peak position
UK Album Downloads (OCC)	29
UK Albums Sales (OCC)	96
UK Independent Albums (OCC)	30
UK Record Store (OCC)	15
