= Porcelain (Emil Bulls album) =

Studio album by Emil Bulls
- Released: May 12, 2003
- Recorded: Conny Planck Studio, Cologne, Germany; Heartbeat Studio, Cologne, Germany; Gismo7 Studio, Motril, Spain
- Genre: Nu metal, alternative metal
- Length: 63:57
- Label: Motor Music
- Producer: Wolfgang Stach

Emil Bulls chronology
Angel Delivery Service (2001)	Porcelain (2003)	The Southern Comfort (2005)

Professional ratings
Review scores
Source	Rating
Laut.de	3/5 stars
Plattentests.de	6/10
Rock Hard	8/10
Visions	7/12

Porcelain is the fourth studio album by German alternative metal band Emil Bulls, released on May 12, 2003. Produced by Wolfgang Stach and mixed by Stephan Glauman, it was the band's first record released on the now (circa 2004) independent Motor Music. The album marks a departure from the rapcore influence found on Angel Delivery Service toward a more progressive sound. It is also the last recording in which drummer Stefan Finauer would partake as a member of the band.

== Track listing ==
All songs written by Emil Bulls. All lyrics written by Christoph von Freydorf.

1. "Porcelain" – 4:13
2. "Cocoon" – 3:21
3. "No Hay Banda" – 3:36
4. "Lava" – 5:58
5. "Moloko Velocet" – 3:28
6. "40 Days" – 3:39
7. "The Coolness Of Being Wretched (Mud Blood and Beer)" – 3:32
8. "Lullaby Overdose" – 2:31
9. "Paranoid Love Affair" – 3:41
10. "This Day" – 3:19
11. "Symbiote" – 4:09
12. "Killer's Kiss" – 5:52
13. "Facials (The Corrosion of Mind)...The Hoover Jam" – 15:56

== Personnel ==
- Christoph von Freydorf – vocals, guitar
- James Richardson – bass (credited as Citnoh)
- Stefan Finauer – drums (credited as Graint)
- Stephan Karl – guitar (credited as M-Oikal)
- Christian Schneider – guitar (credited as Ricky Glam)
- Paul Rzyttka – deejay, synth (credited as DJ Zamzoe)
- Sabastian Gramss – additional strings, vocal design
- Marcel Mader – percussion
- Wolfgang Stach – producer (credited as Wolfgang "Stackman" Stach)
- Oliver Sroweleit – audio engineer
- Stephan Glaumann – mixer
- Roger Lian - mastering
- Gerald von Foris - photography
