= ...And the Circus Leaves Town =

Studio album by Kyuss
- Released: July 11, 1995
- Recorded: March 1–20, 1995
- Studios: Sound City Studios, Van Nuys, California
- Genres: Stoner rock; stoner metal; desert rock
- Length: 71:59
- Label: Elektra
- Producers: Chris Goss; Kyuss

Kyuss chronology
Welcome to Sky Valley (1994)	...And the Circus Leaves Town (1995)	Kyuss / Queens of the Stone Age (1997)

Singles from ...And the Circus Leaves Town
- 1. "One Inch Man" Released: June 9, 1995

...And the Circus Leaves Town is the fourth and final studio album by American stoner rock band Kyuss, released on July 11, 1995, nearly a year before their breakup. Drummer Alfredo Hernández (Yawning Man) replaced Brant Bjork, who left Kyuss in 1993. The album features a tighter and more straightforward sound, both in songwriting and production, than the band's preceding efforts. The album was not as commercially or critically successful as the previous Blues for the Red Sun and Welcome to Sky Valley. Critic Dean Brown attributes this partly to a lack of promotion and the band's breakup, but also notes that the album "deserves to be cherished as much as the two molten hot records that came right before it." A video was released for "One Inch Man", the album's only official single.

== Reception ==
Professional ratings
Review scores
Source	Rating
AllMusic	3/5 stars
Collector's Guide to Heavy Metal	8/10
MetalReviews.com	86/100
The Rolling Stone Album Guide	2.5/5 stars

The album received a positive review in Tharunka, an Australian student publication, in August 1995. The review described the lead single, "One Inch Man", as "unrepresentative" of the album's sound. Two of the tracks, "Jumbo Blimp Jumbo" and "Catamaran", were compared favorably to Black Sabbath and Sonic Youth respectively, and the reviewer noted, "What is admirable here too is songwriter/guitarist Josh's seeming ability to formulate brilliantly executed songs, despite the regular adoption of atypical song-writing structures."

== Track listing ==
Writing credits adapted from the album's liner notes.

No.	Title	Writer(s)	Length
1.	"Hurricane"	Josh Homme, John Garcia	2:41
2.	"One Inch Man"	Garcia, Scott Reeder	3:30
3.	"Thee Ol' Boozeroony"	Reeder	2:47
4.	"Gloria Lewis"	Homme, Garcia	4:02
5.	"Phototropic"	Homme	5:13
6.	"El Rodeo"	Homme, Garcia	5:35
7.	"Jumbo Blimp Jumbo"	Homme	4:39
8.	"Tangy Zizzle"	Homme	2:39
9.	"Size Queen"	Homme	3:46
10.	"Catamaran" (originally performed by Yawning Man)	Alfredo Hernández	2:59
11.	"Spaceship Landing" (ends at 11:14) "M'deea" (hidden track, starts at 14:42) "Day One" (hidden track, starts at 31:41)	Homme Reeder	34:04
Total length:			71:59

== Notes ==
- The song "Catamaran" is a cover of a song originally recorded by drummer Alfredo Hernández' previous band Yawning Man.
- Hidden track "Day One" was originally released in the UK and Germany as part of the "Demon Cleaner" extended CD single under the title "Day One (To Dave and Krist)". It was dedicated to the remaining Nirvana members Dave Grohl and Krist Novoselic, after Kurt Cobain's suicide.
- The song "Hurricane" is featured in the 2006 video game Need for Speed: Carbon. An early recording of the song, as well as "El Rodeo", was released on the "Demon Cleaner" single in 1994.

== Personnel ==
Credits adapted from the album's liner notes. Kyuss

- John Garcia – lead vocals, producer
- Josh Homme – guitar, producer
- Scott Reeder – bass, producer
- Alfredo Hernández – drums, producer

Production

- Chris Goss – producer
- Joe Barresi – recording engineer
- Brian Jenkins – mixing engineer
- Billy Bowers – assistant engineer
- Chad Banford – assistant engineer
- Eddy Schreyer – mastering engineer

Artwork

- Jill Jordan – painting
- Michael Anderson – photography

== Charts ==
Chart performance for ...And the Circus Leaves Town
Chart (1995)	Peak position
Australian Albums (ARIA)	70
German Albums (Offizielle Top 100)	45
UK Albums (OCC)	127
