= Phoenix (Emil Bulls album) =

Studio album by Emil Bulls
- Released: September 25, 2009
- Recorded: April 2009 at Principal Studios, Senden, Germany; Coma Studio, Mülheim an der Ruhr, Germany
- Genre: Alternative metal
- Length: 50:46
- Label: Drakkar Records/Sony BMG
- Producer: Benny Richter & Emil Bulls

Emil Bulls chronology
The Black Path (2008)	Phoenix (2009)	The Feast (2010)

Professional ratings
Review scores
Source	Rating
Laut.de	3/5 stars
Metal Hammer	4/7
Plattentests.de	6/10
Rock Hard	9/10

Phoenix is Emil Bulls' fifth major studio and seventh overall studio album. It was released on September 25, 2009. The first single from the record is "When God Was Sleeping". It is the first album recorded with guitarist Andreas Bock as Christian Schneider left the band to pursue personal projects. It was co-produced by Benny Richter and the band.

== Track listing ==
All songs written by Emil Bulls except where noted.
Lyrics by Christoph von Freydorf.

1. "Here Comes the Fire" (Christoph von Freydorf) – 4:20
2. "When God Was Sleeping" – 3:17
3. "The Architects of My Apocalypse" – 3:15
4. "Ad Infinitum" – 4:13
5. "Infecting the Program" – 3:18
6. "Nothing in This World" – 3:55
7. "Time" (Christoph von Freydorf) – 3:51
8. "It's High Time" – 3:29
9. "The Storm Comes In" – 2:39
10. "Triumph and Disaster" – 3:53
11. "Man Overboard! (The Dark Hour of Reason)" – 4:21
12. "Son of the Morning" – 4:14
13. "I Don't Belong Here" (Christoph von Freydorf) – 6:01

=== Limited Edition ===
14. "Son of the Morning (Sepalot Remix)" – 3:54
15. "When God Was a Razorcat (Dunn Ho' Landrock Remix)" – 3:41
16. "Ad Flamingum (Christ's Flamingo Remix)" – 4:06
17. "Triumphant Disaster (Cadillac Remix)" – 4:31
18. "Fire in the Audience (Sin.bios Remix)" – 4:06

== Personnel ==
- Christoph von Freydorf – vocals, guitar
- James Richardson – bass
- Stephan "Moik" Karl – guitar
- Fabian "Fab" Fuess – drums
- Andreas Bock – guitar, vocals
- Benny Richter - producer, pianos, keyboards
- Klaus Scheuermann – mixer, mastering
- Toni Meloni – sound engineer, editing
- Marco Perdacher - editing
- Clemens Nagl - editing
- Gerald von Foris – photography
- KOMA-Grafik – artwork
