= Angel Delivery Service =

Studio album by Emil Bulls
- Released: June 4, 2001
- Recorded: Heartbeat Studio, Cologne, Germany; Dierks Studio, Cologne, Germany; Galaxy Studio, Belgium
- Genres: Nu metal, rap metal
- Length: 54:48
- Label: Island
- Producer: Wolfgang Stach

Emil Bulls chronology
Monogamy (2000)	Angel Delivery Service (2001)	Porcelain (2003)

Professional ratings
Review scores
Source	Rating
Plattentests.de	6/10
Rock Hard	8/10
Visions	9/12

Angel Delivery Service is the major label debut by the German band Emil Bulls. It was released on June 4, 2001 and produced, as would their next record be, by Wolfgang Stach.

== Track listing ==
All songs written by Emil Bulls except "Take On Me" by Magne Furuholmen, Morten Harket and Pål Waaktaar of the Norwegian group A-ha.

All lyrics are by Christoph von Freydorf except "Style School" (by von Freydorf and Paul Rzyttka) and "Take on Me" (by Furuholmen, Harket and Waakaar).

=== Original Edition ===
1. "Angel Delivery" – 3:00
2. "Style School" – 3:24
3. "Smells Like Rock'N'Roll" – 3:32
4. "Leaving You With This" – 4:18
5. "Water (A Snapshot)" – 3:17
6. "Chickeria" – 3:10
7. "Mirror (Me)" – 4:08
8. "Hi It's Me, Christ" – 3:47
9. "Monogamy" – 5:10
10. "Resurrected" – 4:49
11. "Tomorrow I'll Be Back Home" – 3:18
12. "Wheels Of Steel" – 6:29
13. "Quiet Night" – 6:17

=== Second Edition ===
1. "Angel Delivery" – 3:01
2. "Style School" – 3:25
3. "Smells Like Rock'N'Roll" – 3:30
4. "Leaving You With This" – 4:16
5. "Water (A Snapshot)" – 3:10
6. "Chickeria" – 3:19
7. "Mirror (Me)" – 4:07
8. "Hi It's Me, Christ" – 3:44
9. "Monogamy" – 5:18
10. "Resurrected" – 4:48
11. "Tomorrow I'll Be Back Home" – 3:16
12. "Wheels Of Steel" – 6:20
13. "Quiet Night" – 6:15
14. "Take on Me" – 3:36

== Personnel ==
- Christoph von Freydorf – vocals, guitar
- James Richardson – bass (credited as Citnoh)
- Stefan Finauer – drums (credited as Graint)
- Stephan Karl – guitar (credited as M-Oikal)
- Christian Schneider – guitar (credited as Ricky Glam)
- Paul Rzyttka – deejay, synth (credited as DJ Zamzoe)
- Pain In The Ass – guest vocals (on "Tomorrow I'll Be Back Home")
- Mathias "Jablonski" Elsholz (TAE) – guest vocals (on "Wheels of Steel")
- Dirk Riegener – programming, string arrangement (on "Monogamy")
- Marcel Mader –percussion
- Wolfgang Stach – producer, audio engineer, tambourine (credited as Wolfgang "Stackman" Stach)
- Oliver Sroweleit – audio engineer
- Clemens Matznic – audio engineer
- Pelle Henricsson – mixer, mastering
- Eskil Lõvstrõm – mixer
- Mathias Bothor – photography
