= Gardenia (Kyuss song) =

Single by Kyuss

from the album Welcome to Sky Valley
- B-side: "Un Sandpiper"; "Conan Troutman"
- Released: 1995
- Recorded: 1993, Sound City, Van Nuys, California
- Genre: Stoner rock
- Length: 6:53
- Label: Elektra
- Songwriter(s): Brant Bjork
- Producer(s): Chris Goss; Kyuss

Kyuss singles chronology
"Demon Cleaner" (1994)	"Gardenia" (1995)	"One Inch Man" (1995)

"Gardenia" is a song by American rock band Kyuss. It was released in 1995 as the second single from their third studio album, Welcome to Sky Valley (1994). It was written by the band's drummer, Brant Bjork.

== Accolades ==
Year	Publication	Country	Accolade	Rank
2004	Kerrang!	United Kingdom	"666 Songs You Must Own (Heavy Metal)"	*
"*" denotes an unordered list.

== Track listing ==
Europe CD

1. "Gardenia" – 6:53
2. "Un Sandpiper" – 8:16
3. "Conan Troutman" (Live at the Marquee Club; produced by Hutch) – 2:18

== Personnel ==
- John Garcia – vocals
- Josh Homme – guitar
- Scott Reeder – bass
- Brant Bjork – drums
- Chris Goss – producer
- Joe Barresi – engineering, mixing
