= Sky Valley Mistress =

English rock band

- Origin: Blackburn, Lancashire, England
- Genres: Heavy rock; stoner rock; desert rock
- Years active: 2012–present
- Labels: Holy Roller; New Heavy Sounds
- Members: Kayley "Hell Kitten" Davies; Max "Leather Messiah" Newsome
- Past members: Sean "Starsky" Berry; Russell Russell; Squire Williams
- Website: skyvalleymistress.com

Sky Valley Mistress are an English rock band from Blackburn, Lancashire, formed in 2012 and currently consisting of Kayley "Hell Kitten" Davies and Max "Leather Messiah" Newsome. They have been described musically as heavy rock and stoner rock with influences ranging from Black Sabbath to Queens of the Stone Age. After two early EPs, they released their debut studio album Faithless Rituals in 2020 as a quartet. It was followed nearly six years later with Luna Mausoleum (2026) as a duo, which charted on the UK Independent Albums Chart at no. 30.

== History ==
=== 2012–2018: Formation and early EPs ===
Deriving their name from the Kyuss album Welcome to Sky Valley, Sky Valley Mistress formed in 2012 in Blackburn, Lancashire, England. The following year, they released their debut extended play The Best Thing You've Never Heard and were included as part of the UK's Download Festival. On 15 December 2014, they released their second EP, entitled Rivals, Hounds & Revel Sisters, on Holy Roller Records.

=== 2019–2022: Faithless Rituals ===
In 2019, the band signed to rock music label New Heavy Sounds for a two-album deal. Led by the single "Skull & Pistons", their debut album Faithless Rituals was released on 20 March 2020, having worked on it for roughly five years. That same day, the looming COVID-19 pandemic caused the UK to close down all schools nationwide, and the outbreak of the virus halted their scheduled tour meant to promote the album. Recorded at Rancho de la Luna in California, the album was co-produced by Dave Catching, known for playing guitar for Queens of the Stone Age and Eagles of Death Metal. At that point, the band's lineup consisted of Kayley "Hell Kitten" Davies on vocals, Max "Leather Messiah" Newsome on drums, Sean "Starsky" Berry on guitar, and Russell Russell on bass.

=== 2023–present: Luna Mausoleum ===
On 15 August 2023, Swedish band the Hives were promoting their album The Death of Randy Fitzsimmons with a signing session, and Sky Valley Mistress began playing live outside on Slater Street, Liverpool, England. They were eventually joined by Hives frontman and vocalist Pelle Almqvist while covering their song "Hate to Say I Told You So". Sky Valley Mistress arrived in a hearse.

Preceded by the singles "Too Many Ghosts" and "Thundertaker", the latter named after their hearse, the band released their second studio album Luna Mausoleum on 23 January 2026, again on New Heavy Sounds. The record subsequently charted on the UK Independent Albums Chart at no. 30. By this point in their career, the band's lineup had been reduced to just Davies and Newsome. During live performances, the two share the instrumentals; Newsome simultaneously plays the guitar and kick drum, and on top of vocals, Davies performs on the remainder of the drum kit. They tour in a hearse.

== Style and influences ==
Sky Valley Mistress' music has been variously described as heavy rock, stoner rock, as well as desert rock, with comparisons often made to bands such as Black Sabbath and Queens of the Stone Age. In April 2020 for the website Louder, Sky Valley Mistress, then still a quartet, listed ten of their favourite songs by Queens of the Stone Age frontman Josh Homme, spanning several of his musical projects.

== Members ==
=== Current members ===
- Kayley "Hell Kitten" Davies – vocals, drums
- Max "Leather Messiah" Newsome – drums, guitar

=== Former members ===
- Sean "Starsky" Berry – guitar
- Russell Russell – bass
- Squire Williams – guitar

== Discography ==
=== Studio albums ===
List of studio albums, with selected chart positions
Title	Details	Peak chart positions			
Title	Details	UK DL	UK Indie	UK RS	UK Sales
Faithless Rituals	Released: 20 March 2020; Label: New Heavy Sounds	68	—	—	—
Luna Mausoleum	Released: 23 January 2026; Label: New Heavy Sounds	29	30	15	96
"—" denotes a recording that did not chart.

=== Extended plays ===
List of extended plays
Title	Release details
The Best Thing You've Never Heard	Released: 2013; Format: Download
Rivals, Hounds & Rebel Sisters	Released: 15 December 2014; Label: Holy Roller; Formats: CD, Download
Acoustic Session E.P.	Released: 26 March 2021; Label: New Heavy Sounds; Formats: CD, Download

=== Singles ===
List of singles
Year	Title	Album	Ref.
2016	"Hell Ain't Got Your Hound"	Non-album single	
2020	"Skull & Pistons"	Faithless Rituals	
2025	"Too Many Ghosts"	Luna Mausoleum	
2025	"Thundertaker"	Luna Mausoleum	
