= One Inch Man =

Single by Kyuss

from the album ...And the Circus Leaves Town
- Released: 1995
- Recorded: March 1–20, 1995
- Genre: Stoner rock
- Length: 3:30
- Label: Elektra Records
- Songwriters: John Garcia, Scott Reeder
- Producers: Chris Goss; Kyuss

Kyuss singles chronology
"Gardenia" (1995)	"One Inch Man" (1995)

Music video
- "One Inch Man" on YouTube

One Inch Man is a song by American rock band Kyuss. It is the first and only single from their fourth and final album ...And the Circus Leaves Town, released in 1995.

== Release ==
In the US, "One Inch Man" received some airplay on Active rock radio in 1995.

== Reception ==
Music & Media, in a review of the album, ...And the Circus Leaves Town, stated of the song "Perhaps their abilities are best summarised in the first single "One Inch Man", which boasts a killer guitar riff and hook to match."

In a 2015 retrospective review of the album, The Quietus stated that ""One Inch Man" still stands tall today as a track worthy of the now-lauded Kyuss name."

In a 2020 interview with Louder Sound, Louise Lemón said of "One Inch Man", "The repetitiveness is what gets me going with this track. When I write, I usually write just one or two sentences and I could be fine with that. I love everything that is repetitive, like a mantra, it soothes."

== Music video ==
Kerrang! said of the music video for "One Inch Man": "Case in point: the clip for "One Inch Man" from ...Circus simply shows the band playing in the desert and in a room under psychedelic lights. No glitz, no glamour, but by God they were the band you wanted to have a beer with."

== Track listings ==
Germany CD

1. "One Inch Man" – 3:29
2. "Flip The Phrase" – 2:16
3. "Mudfly" – 2:26
4. "A Day Early And A Dollar Extra" – 2:17

US promo CD, Spain promo CD

1. "One Inch Man" – 3:29

Germany promo cassette

1. "One Inch Man" – 3:29
2. "One Inch Man" – 3:29

== Charts ==
Chart (1995)	Peak position
US Rock (CMJ)	42
