= Listen Without Distraction =

Listen Without Distraction: a tribute to Kyuss

Studio album by various artists
- Released: July 2004
- Genre: Heavy metal
- Length: 73:42
- Label: Dias de Garage
- Producer: Hugo Garcia

Professional ratings
Review scores
Source	Rating
Chronicles of Chaos	3.5/5 stars

Professional ratings
Review scores
Source	Rating
Doom Metal.com	4/5 stars

Argentinean label Dias De Garage released the first-ever tribute to the rock legend Kyuss in July 2004. Titled Listen Without Distraction, the collection was named after the instructions Kyuss used to give music fans on their albums. This CD contains songs from Argentinean bands and features liner notes by ex-Kyuss bass player Scott Reeder.

Commented Scott Reeder after listening to the album: "I'm reminded of why music has been so much a part of my life and brought me so much satisfaction in reaching out to people at home and all over the world." Blabbermouth.net

According to Kyuss tribute Blog Hugo Garcia, the producer of this album, said "In 2005 I released a Kyuss Tribute album called Listen Without Distraction. It was a CD full of 16 Kyuss cover songs done by 16 bands from my country, Argentina. As you can guess, I did that tribute CD to show my love for Kyuss, a band that was not very well known in my country. Time has passed and Kyuss popularity has grown a lot in my country... I guess you can blame it on the internet".

== Track listing ==
1. Thumb (Cygnus)
2. Green Machine (Avernal)
3. One Inch Man (Melissa)
4. Love Has Passed Me By (Sendero Luminoso)
5. Writhe (Taura)
6. Allen’s Wrench (Los Natas)
7. Odyssey (Buffalo)
8. 100°/Whitewater (Cruzdiablo)
9. Space Cadet (Superextra)
10. Phototropic (Sauron)
11. Demon Cleaner (Sick Porky)
12. Supa Scoopa And Mighty Scoop (Sereen)
13. Gardenia (Sunferno)
14. Asteroid (Poseidotica)
15. El Rodeo (Regular Xon)
16. Spaceship Landing (Gallo De Riña)

== Credits ==
Executive producer: Hugo García

Photography: Hugo García

Liner Notes: Scott Reeder

All Songs Written By Kyuss
