= Louise Patricia Crane =

Northern Irish singer-songwriter and musician

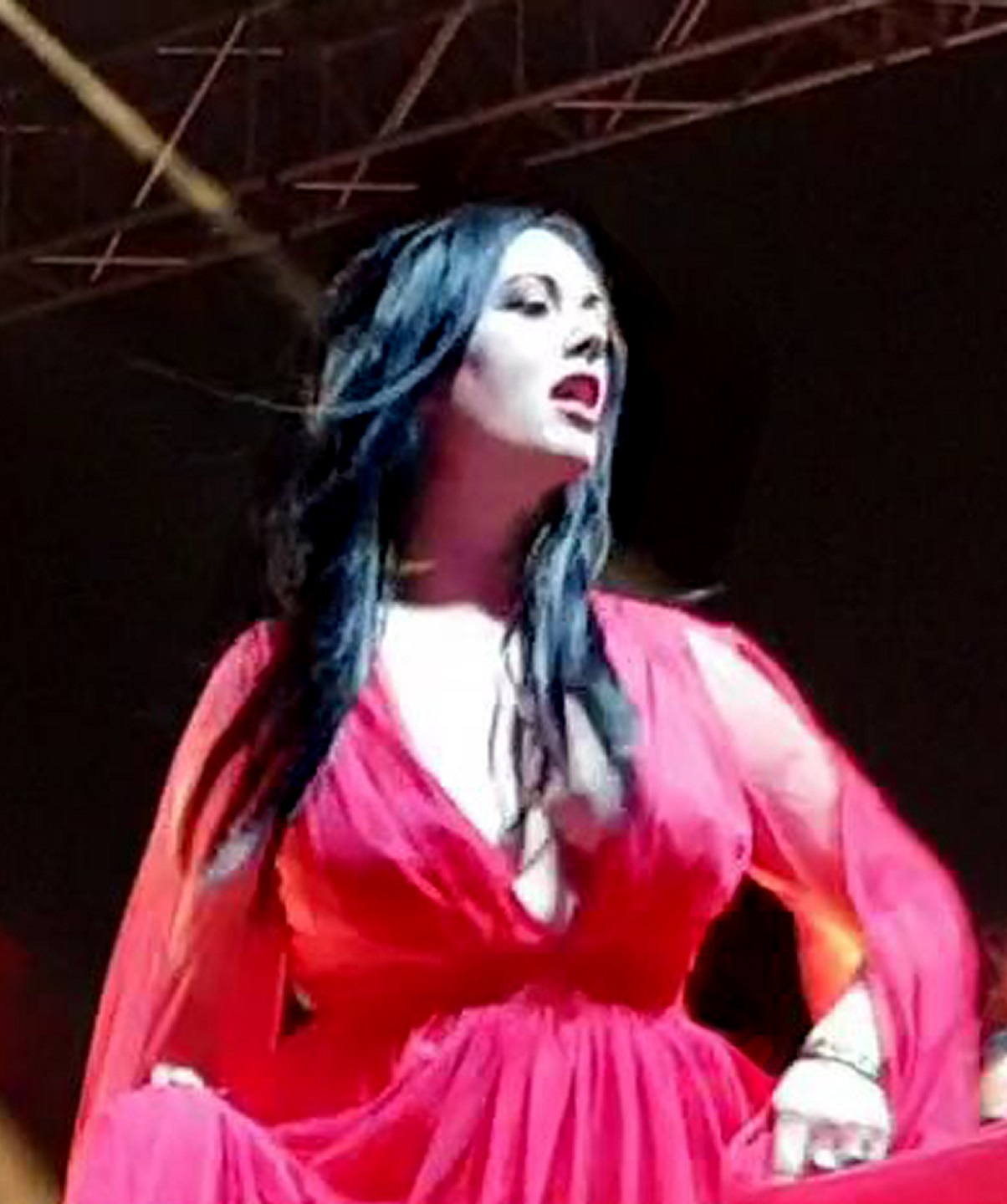
- Louise Patricia Crane performing live at Castle Party Festival in Poland, 13 July 2018

Background information
- Born: Louise Patricia Crane; 8 December 1984 (age 40); Belfast, Northern Ireland
- Genres: Alternative; art rock; baroque pop; folk; avant-garde; progressive rock
- Occupations: Singer-songwriter; composer; producer; visual artist
- Instruments: Vocals; guitar; bass; piano; keyboards
- Years active: 2006–present
- Labels: Alice In...; Jungle Records; Peculiar Doll Records
- Website: louisepatriciacrane.com

Louise Patricia Crane (born 8 December 1984) is a Northern Irish singer-songwriter and musician. She is known for her unique blend of romantic escapism and dreamlike progressive rock, leading to music journalist Dom Lawson dubbing her "The new queen of psychedelic prog".

Born in Belfast, Northern Ireland, Crane began her career in music fronting gothic rock band Solemn Novena in 2006, with whom she gained a small following and wrote and performed on both of their releases. In 2016 she joined The Eden House and debuted on their 2017 album Songs for the Broken Ones.

Crane made her solo debut in 2020, with the album Deep Blue which included contributions from progressive rock veterans Jakko Jakszyk and Ian Anderson, and Kyuss bassist Scott Reeder. In the United Kingdom, the album entered the Official Rock & Metal Albums Chart at number 8, and the Official Independent Albums Chart at number 20.

At the end of 2020, Crane ranked number 5 in Prog's Readers' Poll of the Best Female Vocalists.

Outside of her music career, Crane is a visual artist and has produced album artworks for the band Grooving in Green, and vocalist Monica Richards.

== Career ==
=== Solemn Novena: 2006–2010 ===
In early 2006, with the intent of bringing guitar orientated goth rock back to the forefront of the UK goth scene, Crane along with friends Stuart Harland, Marc McCourt, and Andi Effe formed gothic rock band Solemn Novena. An EP titled As Darkness Falls was released that December, but it wasn't until four years later that their full-length debut album Kiss The Girls was released. Due to various reasons the band split up only two months after the release of their debut album in July 2010.

=== Raven Adore: 2011–2013 ===
After the dissolution of Solemn Novena, Crane and band mate Stuart Harland formed alternative band Raven Adore in 2011.

The following summer, the band recorded five songs for an EP titled Let's Watch Flowers Bloom which was released as a limited edition run of 100 hand numbered digipaks in October 2012. This would ultimately be the band's only release, as Crane and Harland ended the project soon after.

=== The Eden House: 2016–present ===
Sometime in 2013, Crane auditioned for musical ensemble The Eden House by sending through her versions of the tracks "All My Love" and "Trashed Treasure", both originally performed with Julianne Regan on vocals, and a demo of one of her own compositions, "Misery".

In October 2016, it was publicly announced that Crane would be joining the band as a new vocalist and would be appearing on their third studio album, Songs for the Broken Ones. Following the release, the band embarked on a UK tour and two European festival events culminating in a live album for Record Store Day.

== Solo career ==
Following the recording of The Eden House album Songs for the Broken Ones, Crane relocated to Cambridge to embark on her solo career, enlisting The Eden House founder and producer Stephen Carey.

Louise later approached and recruited Progressive rock veterans Jakko Jakszyk of King Crimson and Ian Anderson of Jethro Tull to join the project resulting in the album Deep Blue.

In the United Kingdom, the album entered the Official Rock & Metal Albums Chart at number 8, and the Official Independent Albums Chart at number 20.

Crane released the piano and vocal track 'Springtime' on 17th March 2022 via Bandcamp having composed, written, produced, recorded and mixed the song herself, in her home studio.

In June 2024 Crane released her sophomore album 'Netherworld', described by Classic Rock (magazine) as "a feast of dreamlike prog and parabolic psych-folk". Crane co-produced the album, composing, arranging and playing a wide array of instruments throughout including acoustic and electric guitar, eBow, bass, piano, mellotron and percussion.

Crane's concept for Netherworld was to create a deeply personal work of Magical Realism based upon her own life growing up in Northern Ireland, drawing upon Brothers Grimm fairytales and Irish folklore as common themes within the lyrics and artwork. Many of the songs use animals as a recurring lyrical theme similar to Grimm's Fairy Tales and deal with the darker aspects of the human condition such as self-destruction and nihilism, among contrasting lighter references throughout to Crane's childhood growing up around falconry, plus a folk ode to her cat Bosco featuring Jethro Tull (band) frontman Ian Anderson on flute.

== Peculiar Doll records ==
Peculiar Doll Records is a British record label, founded by Crane in 2019.

The label was created for the launch of her own music as an independent solo artist, with Crane herself illustrating logos, graphically designing packaging and advertisements, and shipping select releases.

== Artwork ==
"I wanted to dare myself to be vulnerable and push myself further as a songwriter... In Celtic folklore there’s the Otherworld, which is like a spirit realm. I wanted to explore the spirits of my own past and present. Some that are good and some that aren’t, of course."

—Louise Patricia Crane on songwriting for Netherworld (2024).

Aside from music, Crane is also a visual artist who works with mixed media.

Early in the creation process for the album Deep Blue, Crane visualised each song as having a corresponding piece of artwork, owing to her chromesthesia. Eight abstract pieces were created and later sold with a deluxe edition of the album.

Crane was commissioned to create the cover artwork for Grooving in Green, a band featuring her Eden House band mate and solo album collaborator Simon Rippin, for their 2019 album A Second Chance....

== Personal life ==
Crane experiences the perceptual phenomenon chromesthesia, a form of synesthesia that involuntarily evokes an experience of colour and imagery while listening to music.

During an interview with Metal-Discovery, it was revealed that Crane is a trained falconer, having grown up with falconry, and during childhood having thirty or forty different birds of prey.

Although left-handed, she plays a right-handed bass guitar.

== Discography ==
=== Studio albums ===
- Deep Blue (2020)
- Netherworld (2024)

=== Singles ===
- Ladies (2023)

with Solemn Novena

- As Darkness Falls EP (2006)
- Kiss The Girls (2010)

with Raven Adore

- Let's Watch Flowers Bloom EP (2012)

with The Eden House

- Songs for the Broken Ones (2017)
- Live in Session (2018)
