= Monogamy (album) =

Studio album by Emil Bulls
- Released: 2000
- Genre: Nu metal, alternative metal
- Length: 56:56
- Label: Oh My Sweet Records

Emil Bulls chronology
| Red Dick's Potatoe Garden (1997) | Monogamy (2000) | Angel Delivery Service (2001) |

Monogamy is the second album by Emil Bulls. It was released in 2000, and re-released in 2004 via Oh My Sweet/ALIVE.

== Track listing ==
| No. | Title | Length |
|---|---|---|
| 1. | "Calm Down" | 3:58 |
| 2. | "Leaving You With This" | 4:21 |
| 3. | "Water" | 0:57 |
| 4. | "Chickeria" | 3:22 |
| 5. | "Mirror (Me)" | 4:02 |
| 6. | "Moonchild (Intro)" | 0:44 |
| 7. | "Hi It's Me, Christ" | 4:21 |
| 8. | "Monogamy" | 5:25 |
| 9. | "Obstacles" | 2:38 |
| 10. | "Resurrected" | 4:24 |
| 11. | "Smells Like Rock 'n' Roll" | 4:11 |
| 12. | "Wheels Of Steel" | 6:23 |
| 13. | "Quiet Night" | 6:50 |
| 14. | "DJ Sam Soe's Moonchild" | 5:20 |
| Total length: | | 62:16 |
