= Demon Cleaner (song) =

Single by Kyuss

from the album Welcome to Sky Valley
- Released: September 1994
- Recorded: Early 1993
- Genre: Stoner rock; desert rock
- Length: 5:19
- Label: Elektra Records
- Songwriter: Josh Homme
- Producers: Kyuss, Chris Goss

Kyuss singles chronology
| "Green Machine" (1993) | "Demon Cleaner" (1994) | "Gardenia" (1995) |

Music video
- "Demon Cleaner" on YouTube

Demon Cleaner is a song by American rock band Kyuss. It was released as the first single from their third album Welcome to Sky Valley in 1994. It was written by the band's guitarist Josh Homme.

== Release ==
Released as a single in September 1994, "Demon Cleaner" was Kyuss' biggest hit. The b-side to the single, "Day One (To Chris and Dave)", is apparently dedicated to surviving Nirvana band members Krist Novoselic and Dave Grohl as it was released after the death of Nirvana band leader, Kurt Cobain.

In 2000, the song "Demon Cleaner" was re-released on Muchas Gracias: The Best of Kyuss, which although was promoted as a "best of" album was actually mostly a collection of b-sides, live tracks and rarities.

In 2018, the song was released once more on the compilation album "Green Machine", which was only made available on Spotify.

== Reception ==
In their review of Welcome to Sky Valley, CMJ tells the reader to "cleanse your mind with 'Demon Cleaner'".

A review by the Gavin Report stated "Psychedelic hard rock enthusiasts rejoice! Elektra Records treats you to more groove-infested rock from Kyuss with the release of 'Demon Cleaner', a four-song EP featuring three live tracks recorded at the Marquee Club in Hamburg. Squirrely guitar licks layered with Sabbath-styled rhythms, severe drum bashing and haunting vocals await you when you throw this puppy on."

In a retrospective review, Louder Sound stated, "This song has got it all, you're spellbound from the first second. The vocals on this track are amazing." Paste rated it number 4 in their 8 Best Josh Homme Songs. Guitar.com included it in their 11 Essential Stoner Rock And Metal Tracks To Hear In 2021. Ultimate Classic Rock described the song as having a monster groove.

== Music video ==
A review of the music video by CMJ stated that Kyuss produces a pretty dark racket. Unsurprisingly, the band's latest video is filled with characters of sinister and curious.

== Personnel ==
- John Garcia – lead vocals, producer
- Josh Homme – guitar, backing vocals, producer
- Scott Reeder – bass, backing vocals, producer
- Brant Bjork – drums, producer

== Track listings ==
Australia CD, Europe CD1 (limited edition), Germany CD

1. "Demon Cleaner" – 5:11
2. "Day One (To Chris and Dave)" – 1:50
3. "El Rodeo" – 5:24
4. "Hurricane" – 2:49

Germany CD2

1. "Demon Cleaner" – 5:11
2. "Gardenia" (Live) – 6:46
3. "Thumb" (Live) – 4:38
4. "Conan Troutman" (Live) – 2:18

UK 7" (limited edition)

1. "Demon Cleaner" – 5:11
2. "Freedom Run" (Live) – 7:54

US promo CD

1. "Demon Cleaner" – 5:11

== Charts ==
| Chart (1994–1995) | Peak position |
|---|---|
| UK Singles (Official Charts) | 78 |
| UK Rock & Metal (Official Charts) | 13 |
| US Top 40 Rock Airplay (Gavin Report) | 25 |

== Cover versions ==
"Demon Cleaner" has been covered live by American rock band Tool.

== Use in other media ==
"Demon Cleaner" featured in the 2009 videogame Guitar Hero: Metallica.

== Legacy ==
Swedish stoner rock band, Demon Cleaner, took their band-name from the Kyuss song.
