= Emil Bulls =

German rock band

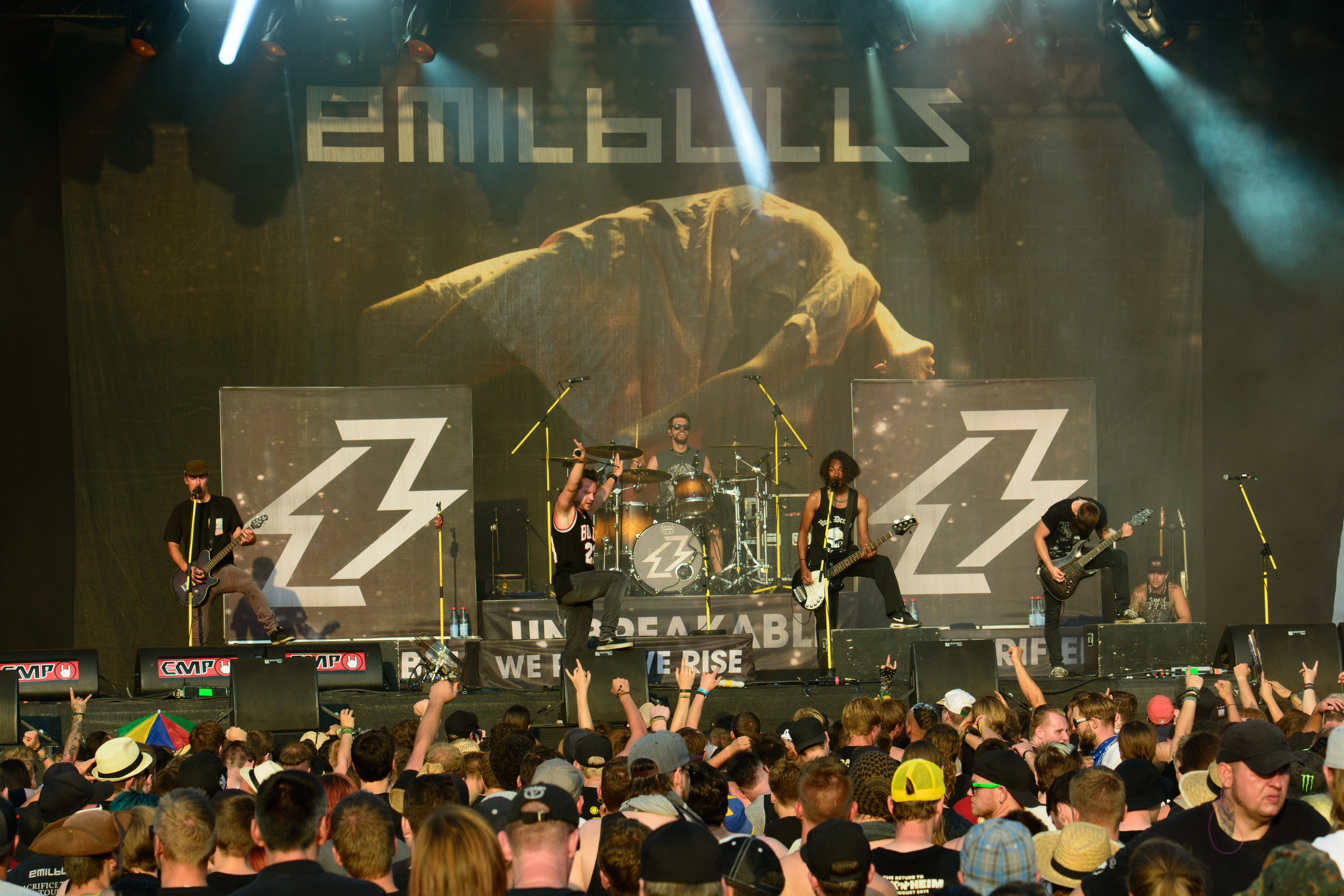
- Emil Bulls at the Reload Festival in 2016

Background information
- Origin: Munich, Germany
- Genres: Alternative metal; nu metal; alternative rock
- Years active: 1995–present
- Labels: Oh My Sweet; Island; Motor; Pirate; Drakkar; Arising Empire
- Members: Christoph von Freydorf; Stephan Karl; Andreas Bock; Fabian Fuess; Pascal Theisen
- Past members: Stefan Finauer; Paul Rzyttka; Franz Wickenhäuser; Christian Schneider; Klaus Kössinger; Manuel Lotter; James Richardson
- Website: emilbulls.com

Emil Bulls is a German rock band that was formed in 1995 in Munich, Bavaria. The group currently consists of Christoph "Christ" von Freydorf, Stephan "M-Oikal" Karl, Fabian "Füß" Fuess, Andreas "Andy" Bock and Pascal "Passy" Theisen.

The band has released 16 studio albums, including their latest "Love Will Fix It", released in 2024.

== History ==
In 1995, Christoph "Christ" von Freydorf (vocals) and Stefan "Fini" Finauer (drums), pupils of a convent school, founded the band together with Christoph's church choir friend Jamie "Citnoh" Richardson (bass guitar). They were joined by Stephan Karl "Moik" and Franz Wickenhäuser (both guitar). The band was founded in Hohenschäftlarn near Munich. The name Emil Bulls is derived from a children's movie.

In 1996, they recorded their first CD Red Dick's Potatoe Garden themselves. In 1997, they attended the Emergenza festival, won the regional finals in Munich and finished third in the European competition. For this competition they hired DJ Paul Rzyttka (known as DJ Zamzoe) who afterwards became a permanent member of the band.

After a long tour, their album Monogamy was released by the indie record label Oh My Sweet Records. The record could only be purchased through the internet or during live shows. Monogamy was noticed by Island Records, which offered the band a recording deal. Some of the songs on Monogamy and a few new songs were recorded. The result was Angel Delivery Service, released in 2001. The album was already out of stock a few months later. A new edition was released including a cover version of A-Ha's "Take on Me". The songs "Smells Like Rock 'n' Roll", "Leaving You with This" and "Take on Me" were released as singles.

In May 2002, Porcelain was released through Motor Music. "The Coolness of Being Wretched" and "This Day" were released as singles. Between June 2001 and August 2002, the band played 129 live shows including Rock am Ring. In August 2003, drummer Stefan Finauer left the band to go to university. He was replaced by Fabian Fab Füß. In 2003, the band played some shows in Canada and the United States.

On 20 June 2005, The Southern Comfort was released on Pirate Records. It was the last record with DJ Zamzoe.

In February 2007, the live and acoustic album The Life Acoustic was released. The album, which was recorded in Pullach in 2006, was followed by an acoustic tour.

The following album The Black Path was released on 4 April 2008, on Drakkar records. The single "The Most Evil Spell" was offered as a free download.

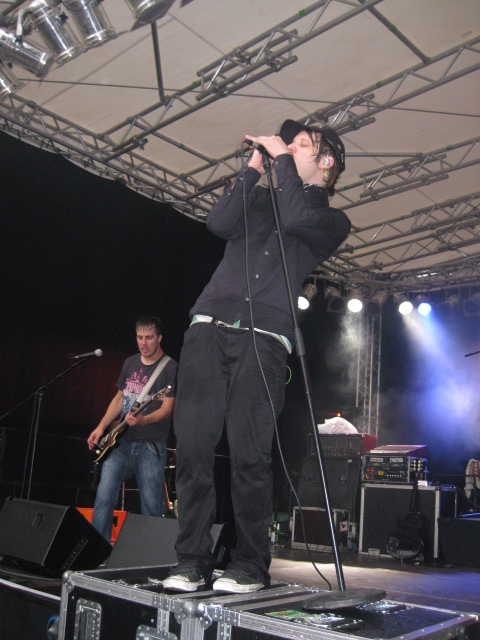
Emil Bulls in Gießen, Germany 2009

In 2009, Chrissy Schneider left the band and was replaced by Andy Bock, who was the guitar player of From Constant Visions. On 25 September 2009, Phoenix was released. "Here Comes The Fire" was offered as a free download on their website. In September 2009, a music video of "When God Was Sleeping" was released.

The band's next studio offering, Oceanic, was to be released on 30 September 2011.

In 2014, the band recorded new album Sacrifice to Venus and released it on 8 August the same year.

In the beginning of 2016, the band released double best-of compilation XX. CD1 contained acoustic versions of best Emil Bulls songs while on CD2 there were original versions.

The studio album called Kill Your Demons was released on 29 September 2017.

In May 2022, Richardson announced on their social media page that he will be stepping back from touring because of multiple sclerosis. Pascal Theisen (of Cadet Carter) took over as Richardson's replacement.

The latest release from Emil Bulls is the studio album called Love Will Fix It, released January 12th, 2024.

== Members ==
Current members

- Christoph "Christ" von Freydorf - vocals (1995–present), guitar (1995–present)
- Stephan "M-Oikal" Karl - guitar (1995–present)
- Fabian "Füß" Fuess - drums (2003–2010, 2017–present)
- Andreas "Andy" Bock - guitar, backing vocals (2009–present)
- Pascal "Passy" Theisen - bass, backing vocals (2022–present)

Former members

- Stefan "Graint" Finauer - drums (1995–2003)
- Paul "DJ Zamzoe" Rzyttka - turntables, sampler (1997–2005)
- Franz Wickenhäuser - guitar (1995–1999)
- Christian "Ricky Glam" Schneider - guitar (1999–2009)
- Klaus "Kanone" Kössinger - drums (2010–2014)
- Manuel "Manu" Lotter - drums (2014–2017)
- Jamie "Citnoh" Richardson - bass, backing vocals (1995–2022)

== Discography ==
=== Studio albums ===
==== Independent releases ====
- 1995: Made In India
- 1997: Red Dick's Potatoe Garden
- 1998: Fell Sick EP
- 2000: Monogamy

==== Major-label releases ====
- 2001: Angel Delivery Service
- 2003: Porcelain
- 2005: The Southern Comfort
- 2008: The Black Path
- 2009: Phoenix
- 2011: Oceanic
- 2014: Sacrifice to Venus (#6 Germany)
- 2014: Those Were the Days: Best Of
- 2016: XX
- 2017: Kill Your Demons
- 2019: Mixtape
- 2024: Love Will Fix It

=== Live albums ===
- 2007: The Life Acoustic

=== DVDs ===
- 2003: Mud, Blood and Beer
- 2010: The Feast

=== Singles ===
- 2001: "Smells Like Rock 'n' Roll"
- 2001: "Leaving You with This"
- 2001: "Take On Me"
- 2003: "The Coolness of Being Wretched"
- 2003: "This Day"
- 2006: "Newborn"
- 2006: "Revenge"
- 2008: "The Most Evil Spell"
- 2009: "When God Was Sleeping"
- 2011: "Between the Devil and the Deep Blue Sea"
- 2011: "The Jaws of Oblivion"
- 2012: "The Knight in Shining Armour"
- 2012: "Not Tonight Josephine"
- 2014: "Hearteater"
- 2014: "Pants Down"
- 2017: "The Ninth Wave"
- 2017: "Kill Your Demons"

=== Music videos ===
- 2001: "Leaving You with This"
- 2001: "Take On Me"
- 2001: "Smells Like Rock 'n' Roll"
- 2003: "This Day"
- 2003: "Serenity now"
- 2005: "Newborn"
- 2005: "Mongoose"
- 2005: "Friday Night"
- 2008: "The Most Evil Spell"
- 2008: "Worlds Apart"
- 2009: "When God Was Sleeping"
- 2009: "Nothing in This World"
- 2010: "The Architects of My Apocalypse"
- 2011: "The Jaws of Oblivion"
- 2011: "Between the Devil and the Deep Blue Sea"
- 2012: "The Knight in Shining Armour"
- 2012: "Not Tonight Josephine"
- 2014: "Pants Down"
- 2017: "Kill Your Demons"
- 2019: "Mr. Brightside [The Killers Cover]"
- 2019: "Tell It To My Heart [Taylor Dayne Cover]"
- 2019: "Survivor [Destiny's Child Cover]"
- 2023: "The Devil Made Me Do It"
- 2024: "Love Will Fix It"
- 2025: "My Favorite Waste Of Time"
