= The Southern Comfort =

Studio album by Emil Bulls
- Released: June 20, 2005
- Recorded: 2005 at 40HM Music, Munich
- Genre: Hard rock, Alternative metal
- Length: 52:08
- Label: Pirate Records
- Producer: Klaus Scheuermann and Emil Bulls

Emil Bulls chronology
| Porcelain (2003) | The Southern Comfort (2005) | The Life Acoustic (2007) |

Professional ratings
Review scores
| Source | Rating |
|---|---|
| Laut.de | 2/5 stars |
| Plattentests.de | 6/10 |
| Rock Hard | 8.5/10 |
| Visions | 7/12 |

The Southern Comfort is the fifth album by Emil Bulls, released on June 20, 2005. Singles from this album were "Newborn" then "Revenge". It is their first release with Fabian Fuess playing the drums. DJ Zamzoe (Paul Rzyttka) is featured on the record but not as part of the band as he had previously left the band to pursue other projects.

== Track listing ==
All lyrics by Christoph von Freydorf.
All songs were written by Emil Bulls and DJ Zamzoe, except where noted.

1. "The Southern Comfort" - 0:44
2. "Revenge" - 3:53
3. "Ignorance Is Bliss" (Christoph von Freydorf) - 4:24
4. "Newborn" (von Freydorf) - 3:59
5. "A Southern Lullaby" (James Richardson) - 1:02
6. "These Are The Days" - 3:45
7. "Wolves" (von Freydorf) - 3:43
8. "At Fleischberg's" - 3:43
9. "Magnificent Lies" (Richardson) - 3:39
10. "Mongoose" (von Freydorf) - 4:51
11. "Bachham" - 4:20
12. "Friday Night" - 4:11
13. "Underground" - 5:52
14. "Swoin-Soo" (Hidden Bonus Track) - 4:02

=== Digitally Purchasable Bonus Songs ===
These songs are only available through online stores and do not appear on any cd version of the album.

1. "No Chucks" - 4:34
2. "Dog Days" - 3:33

== Personnel ==
- Christoph von Freydorf – vocals, guitar
- James Richardson – bass (credited as Citnoh)
- Fabian Fuess – drums
- Stephan Karl – guitar (credited as M-Oikal)
- Christian Schneider – guitar (credited as Ricky Glam)
- Paul Rzyttka – Deejay (credited as DJ Zamzoe)
- Hans Tauscheck – string & piano arrangements (on "At Fleischberg's", "Mongoose" and "Friday Night")
- Dominik Hofmann – trombone (on "The Southern Comfort")
- Klaus Scheuermann – producer, mixer
- Roger Lian – mastering
- J. Reich – photography
- Stephan Hefring – artwork
