= Sons of Kyuss (EP) =

EP by Sons of Kyuss
- Released: April 19, 1990
- Recorded: 1989
- Studio: Headway Studios, Westminster, California
- Genre: Stoner rock
- Length: 28:54
- Label: Black Highway, Smash!
- Producer: Catherine Enny, Ron Krown

Kyuss chronology
Sons of Kyuss (1990)	Wretch (1991)

Professional ratings
Review scores
Source	Rating
Encyclopaedia Metallum	62/100
Sputnikmusic	3/5 stars

Sons of Kyuss is the debut EP by American rock band Kyuss, released in 1990 under the group's original name, Sons of Kyuss. The band released it independently as a vinyl record, pressing only 500 copies. Following this release, the band shortened its name to Kyuss and included these recordings of the songs "Deadly Kiss" and "Black Widow" on their first full-length album, Wretch (1991), while re-recording "Love Has Passed Me By", "Katzenjammer", and "Isolation Desolation" for the album (the latter song's title was shortened to "Isolation").

== Track listing ==
The EP's liner notes credit the writing of all songs to Sons of Kyuss, consisting of John Garcia, Josh Homme, Chris Cockrell, and Brant Bjork. The liner notes of Wretch, on which five of the EP's eight songs appear, give more specific writing credits, with "Deadly Kiss", "Isolation Desolation", and "Black Widow" attributed solely to Homme, while "Love Has Passed Me By" is attributed to Homme and Bjork and "Katzenjammer" to Homme and Cockrell.

Side A
No.	Title	Writer(s)	Length
1.	"Deadly Kiss"	Homme	5:05
2.	"Window of Souls"	Garcia, Homme, Cockrell, Bjork	4:23
3.	"King"	Garcia, Homme, Cockrell, Bjork	3:07
4.	"Isolation Desolation"	Homme	3:33

Side B
No.	Title	Writer(s)	Length
5.	"Love Has Passed Me By"	Homme, Bjork	3:14
6.	"Black Widow"	Homme	2:42
7.	"Happy Birthday"	Garcia, Homme, Cockrell, Bjork	3:50
8.	"Katzenjammer"	Homme, Cockrell	3:00
Total length:			28:54

== Personnel ==
Credits adapted from the EP's liner notes.

Kyuss

- John Garcia – vocals
- Josh Homme – guitar
- Chris Cockrell – bass guitar
- Brant Bjork – drums

Production

- Catherine Enny – record producer
- Ron Krown – record producer
- J.B. Lawrence – recording engineer
- Michael Mikulka – mixing engineer
- Tim Shean – assistant engineer
- Tom Nunes – assistant engineer

Artwork

- Merle Schoelkoph – photography
- Debra Hintz – layout
