= Blues for the Red Sun =

Studio album by Kyuss
- Released: June 30, 1992
- Recorded: 1992
- Studios: Sound City Studios, Van Nuys, California
- Genres: Stoner rock; stoner metal; desert rock
- Length: 50:39
- Label: Dali
- Producers: Chris Goss; Kyuss

Kyuss chronology
Wretch (1991)	Blues for the Red Sun (1992)	Welcome to Sky Valley (1994)

Singles from Blues for the Red Sun
- 1. "Green Machine" Released: 1993

Blues for the Red Sun is the second studio album by American rock band Kyuss, released in 1992. While the album received mainly favorable reviews, it fared poorly commercially, selling only 39,000 units. It has since become a very influential album within the stoner rock genre. It was the last Kyuss album to feature bassist Nick Oliveri, who was replaced by Scott Reeder shortly after recording had been completed. The album is dedicated to Oliveri's father who died in a car accident in 1991.

== Touring, promotion, and release ==
In support of the album, Kyuss went on tour with such established groups as Faith No More, White Zombie, and Danzig. In early 1993, the band was chosen by Metallica to be an opening act for nine shows in Australia. After their first show with Metallica, the group was only allowed to use half the P.A. system for the other eight concerts.

The music videos for the songs "Green Machine" and "Thong Song" received moderate rotation on MTV's Headbangers Ball and on MuchMusic in Canada. The album also received airplay on album-oriented radio stations such as KNAC, KISW, WYSP, and KIOZ. The album was released by the independent record label Dali, which was later bought out by Elektra Records. It ended up selling only 39,000 copies.

== Musical style and influence ==
Blues for the Red Sun incorporates stoner rock and desert rock, and has been compared to acts such as Black Sabbath, Hawkwind, Blue Cheer, and Alice in Chains. Daniel Bukszpan, the author of The Encyclopedia of Heavy Metal, has written that the album has influenced "countless" bands. Many consider Blues for the Red Sun "the template for 21st-century bands that have followed in the pioneering wake of Kyuss". Martin Popoff similarly credits the band with the creation of a "certain core sample" of stoner rock, in part due to an "uncompromising bassquake" that was composed of more than "tar-pitted Sabbath riffs". Exclaim! credited the album for opening "the way for bands like Monster Magnet and a whole host of other desert grunge practitioners". Melissa Auf der Maur has said that she attempted to "knock-off" Blues for the Red Sun for her single "Followed the Waves", to the point that she recruited the band's rhythm section to play on the track and Chris Goss to produce. Other fans of the album include Dave Grohl and Metallica.

Steve Taylor, the author of A to X of Alternative Music, wrote that, in comparison to the music, "lyrics can't really compete", and went on to call the album's lyrics "stoned immaculate phrases". Rolling Stone described the lyrics of "Thong Song" — a song about flip-flops — as "deathless".

Guitarist Josh Homme plugged down-tuned guitars into Marshall amplifiers (specifically a Marshall JCM900 4100) with Ampeg 8x10 cabinets for the distortion featured on the album. Wah-wah pedals were also used by Homme on Blues for the Red Sun. Wayne Robins of Newsday described Homme's riffs as "post-Hendrix guitar flurries". Several of the songs on Blues for the Red Sun have slow tempos and groove-laden rhythms. "Green Machine" features a bass guitar solo, and the album features several instrumental tracks. A number of songs on the album also credit lyrics to John Garcia, but have no discernible lyrics or even vocals.

== Reception ==
Professional ratings
Review scores
Source	Rating
AllMusic	4.5/5 stars
Billboard	(favorable)
Collector's Guide to Heavy Metal	9/10
Entertainment Weekly	B+
Kerrang!	5/5 stars
Q	5/5 stars
The Rolling Stone Album Guide	4/5 stars

The album received acclaim from both fans and critics. Steve Taylor considers it the best album Kyuss ever made. AllMusic's Eduardo Rivadavia gave the album four and a half out of five stars and called the album "a major milestone in heavy music". In particular, he praised producer Chris Goss for its "unique heavy/light formula". Debaroh Frost of Entertainment Weekly gave the album a B+. Rolling Stone considered "Green Machine" and "Thong Song" to be the album's highlights and also thought that the production had greatly improved from the band's previous album, Wretch. Kerrang! also gave the album a favorable review. College Music Journal claimed that the album was "raw and unorthodox" and, like Rivadavia, complimented Chris Goss for the production. Q called it "one of the landmark metal albums of the '90s", and rewarded it a perfect five out of five stars. Guitar Player magazine added the song "Green Machine" in their 1995 article titled "50 Heaviest Riffs of All Time".

Spin ranked Blues for the Red Sun 10th on their list of the "10 Best Albums You Didn't Hear in '92". In 2002, Spin put the album in 36th place on their list of the "40 Greatest Metal Albums of All Time". IGN listed the album as an honorable mention on their list of the "Top 25 Metal Albums". Chad Bowar of About.com named the album the 8th best heavy metal album of 1992 and went on to write that Blues for the Red Sun "was a landmark album that influenced a lot of bands". MusicRadar included the album on "The 50 Greatest Heavy Metal Albums of All Time" and ranked it in 48th place. In 2017, Rolling Stone ranked Blues for the Red Sun 41st on their list of "The 100 Greatest Metal Albums of All Time".

== Track listing ==
Writing credits adapted from the album's liner notes.

No.	Title	Lyrics	Music	Length
1.	"Thumb"	Josh Homme	Homme, Brant Bjork	4:41
2.	"Green Machine"	Bjork	Bjork	3:38
3.	"Molten Universe" (instrumental)	John Garcia	Homme	2:49
4.	"50 Million Year Trip (Downside Up)"	Bjork	Bjork	5:52
5.	"Thong Song"	Homme	Homme	3:47
6.	"Apothecaries' Weight" (instrumental)	Garcia	Homme	5:21
7.	"Caterpillar March" (instrumental)		Bjork	1:56
8.	"Freedom Run"	Homme, Bjork	Homme	7:37
9.	"800" (instrumental)	Garcia	Homme	1:34
10.	"Writhe"	Homme	Homme	3:42
11.	"Capsized" (instrumental)	Garcia	Homme	0:55
12.	"Allen's Wrench"	Bjork	Bjork, Homme	2:44
13.	"Mondo Generator"	Nick Oliveri	Oliveri	6:15
14.	"Yeah"	Garcia	none (spoken word)	0:04
Total length:				50:39

== Personnel ==
Credits adapted from the album's liner notes.

Kyuss

- John Garcia – lead vocals on all tracks except "Mondo Generator" and "Writhe", producer
- Josh Homme – guitar, lead vocals on "Writhe", producer
- Nick Oliveri – bass, lead vocals on "Mondo Generator", producer
- Brant Bjork – drums, album concept, producer

Production

- Chris Goss – producer
- Joe Barresi – recording engineer, mixing engineer
- Brian Jenkins – drum tracking engineer
- Jeff Sheehan – assistant engineer
- Mike Bosely – additional mixing
- Howie Weinberg – mastering engineer

Artwork

- Skiles – art director
- Art Industria – design
- Marc Rude – cover illustration
- Big Bear Solar Observatory – cover photography
- Michael Anderson – additional photography

== Charts ==
Weekly chart performance for Blues for the Red Sun
Chart (2023)	Peak position
Hungarian Physical Albums (MAHASZ)	26
