= Wretch (album) =

Studio album by Kyuss
- Released: September 23, 1991
- Recorded: 1989–1991
- Studio: Headway Studios (Westminster, California); Master Control Recording Studios (Burbank, California)
- Genre: Stoner rock; stoner metal
- Length: 48:49
- Label: Dali
- Producer: Catherine Enny; Ron Krown; Kyuss

Kyuss chronology
Sons of Kyuss (1990)	Wretch (1991)	Blues for the Red Sun (1992)

Professional ratings
Review scores
Source	Rating
AllMusic	2.5/5 stars
Collector's Guide to Heavy Metal	8/10
The Rolling Stone Album Guide	2.5/5 stars

Wretch is the first full-length album by American rock band Kyuss, released in September 1991. The tracks "Black Widow" and "Deadly Kiss" are taken from the band's debut EP, Sons of Kyuss (1990), recorded with original bassist Chris Cockrell, while the rest of the album was recorded with his replacement Nick Oliveri. The Sons of Kyuss songs "Love Has Passed Me By", "Katzenjammer", and "Isolation Desolation" were re-recorded for Wretch, the latter's title shortened to "Isolation".

== Track listing ==
Writing credits adapted from the album's liner notes.

No.	Title	Writer(s)	Length
1.	"(Beginning of What's About to Happen) Hwy 74"	Josh Homme	4:43
2.	"Love Has Passed Me By"	Homme, Brant Bjork	3:12
3.	"Son of a Bitch"	Homme, John Garcia, Nick Oliveri	6:03
4.	"Black Widow" (from Sons of Kyuss, 1990)	Homme	2:44
5.	"Katzenjammer"	Homme, Chris Cockrell	2:23
6.	"Deadly Kiss" (from Sons of Kyuss, 1990)	Homme	5:05
7.	"The Law"	Homme, Oliveri	7:53
8.	"Isolation"	Homme	2:48
9.	"I'm Not"	Homme, Garcia	4:39
10.	"Big Bikes"	Bjork	5:01
11.	"Stage III"	Bjork	4:14
Total length:			48:49

== Personnel ==
Credits adapted from the album's liner notes.

Kyuss

- John Garcia – vocals, producer
- Josh Homme – guitar, producer
- Brant Bjork – drums, producer
- Nick Oliveri – bass (all tracks except "Black Widow" and "Deadly Kiss"), producer
- Chris Cockrell – bass on "Black Widow" and "Deadly Kiss"

Production

- Catherine Enny – producer
- Ron Krown – producer
- J.B. Lawrence – recording engineer
- Chris Fuhrman – mixing engineer (all tracks except "Black Widow" and "Deadly Kiss")
- Michael Mikulka – mixing engineer of "Black Widow" and "Deadly Kiss"
- Carol Hibbs – mastering engineer

Artwork

- Harlan Williams – layout, design
- NTS – art direction
- Mark Cieslikowski – back cover photograph
