= Welcome to Sky Valley =

Studio album by Kyuss
- Released: June 28, 1994
- Recorded: Early 1993
- Studio: Sound City (Van Nuys, California)
- Genre: Stoner rock; stoner metal; desert rock
- Length: 51:55
- Label: Elektra
- Producer: Chris Goss; Kyuss

Kyuss chronology
Blues for the Red Sun (1992)	Welcome to Sky Valley (1994)	...And the Circus Leaves Town (1995)

Singles from Welcome to Sky Valley
- 1. "Demon Cleaner" Released: 1994; 2. "Gardenia" Released: 1995

Professional ratings
Review scores
Source	Rating
AllMusic	4/5 stars
Christgau's Consumer Guide	(dud)
Collector's Guide to Heavy Metal	9/10
Daily Republic	A−
Entertainment Weekly	B+
The Rolling Stone Album Guide	3/5 stars

Welcome to Sky Valley (also known as Sky Valley and Kyuss) is the third studio album by American stoner rock band Kyuss, released on June 28, 1994, through Elektra Records.

Welcome to Sky Valley was the band's first album to feature bassist Scott Reeder, who replaced Nick Oliveri in 1992. The album was also the last to feature founding member Brant Bjork, who left the band shortly after recording concluded. The song "N.O." was originally recorded by Across the River, a band fronted by Mario Lalli and featuring bassist Reeder. After Reeder left the Obsessed and joined Kyuss, Bjork suggested they record "N.O." as a tribute to Across the River.

== Background and recording ==
Welcome to Sky Valley was recorded in early 1993 and scheduled for release in January 1994. They sneak-previewed the completed album at Foundations Forum 93 and contributed the song "Demon Cleaner" to the sampler disc. Due to mild success from their previous album, Kyuss had been promoted from their subsidiary record label "Dali" to the main label "Chameleon". On November 11, 1993, Chameleon Records abruptly shut down. Their joint-venture partner Elektra Records quickly picked up the band and scheduled the album for release in March 1994. The album was released three months after that, a year after being recorded.

== Release history ==
On CD, Welcome to Sky Valley was originally released with its ten total songs contained in three tracks, with an additional, fourth hidden track. It was later re-released with all ten tracks separated individually.

== Musical style ==
Musically, Welcome to Sky Valley has been described as a stoner rock and stoner metal album. According to Eduardo Rivadavia of Loudwire, the album's tracks "spun waves of feedback like expanding nebulae." Writing for AllMusic, Rivadavia also stated that the album's songs display "the band's impressive creative range, from furious metal to psychedelic grooves, and anything in between."

== Legacy ==
The band Tool covered "Demon Cleaner" live twice (albeit with slight lyrics changes), with bassist Scott Reeder joining them onstage during the performances: March 27, 1998, in Los Angeles, California, at The Hollywood Palladium, March 29, 1998, in San Diego, California, at The Rimac Theatre.

The English heavy rock band Sky Valley Mistress named themselves after Welcome to Sky Valley.

== Track listing ==
All tracks are written by Josh Homme, except where noted

I
No.	Title	Writer(s)	Length
1.	"Gardenia"	Brant Bjork	6:54
2.	"Asteroid"		4:49
3.	"Supa Scoopa and Mighty Scoop"		6:04

II
No.	Title	Writer(s)	Length
4.	"100°"		2:29
5.	"Space Cadet"	Homme, Scott Reeder	7:02
6.	"Demon Cleaner"		5:19

III
No.	Title	Writer(s)	Length
7.	"Odyssey"		4:19
8.	"Conan Troutman"		2:12
9.	"N.O." (Across the River cover)	Reeder, Mario Lalli	3:47
10.	"Whitewater"	Bjork	8:00

Hidden track
No.	Title	Length
11.	"Lick Doo"	0:57
Total length:		51:55

== Personnel ==
Credits adapted from the album's liner notes.

Kyuss

- John Garcia – lead vocals, producer
- Josh Homme – guitar, backing vocals, producer
- Scott Reeder – bass, acoustic bass in "Space Cadet", backing vocals, producer
- Brant Bjork – drums, producer

Additional performers

- Peter Moffett – additional percussion on "Asteroid"
- "Madman of Encino" – backing vocals
- Mario Lalli – lead guitar on "N.O."

Production

- Chris Goss – producer
- Joe Barresi – recording engineer, mixing engineer
- Jeff Sheehan – assistant engineer
- Wade Norton – assistant engineer
- Alexe Campbell – assistant engineer
- Brian Jenkins – additional engineering
- Eddy Schreyer – mastering engineer

Artwork

- Alex Solca – photography
- Skiles – art director

== Charts ==
Chart performance for Welcome to Sky Valley
Chart (1994)	Peak position
Australian Albums (ARIA)	53
German Albums (Offizielle Top 100)	74
