= Scott Reeder (bassist) =

American bassist

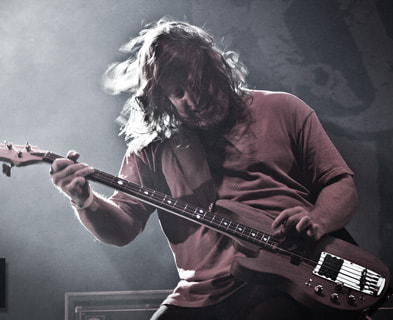
- Reeder with Kyuss Lives! in 2011

Background information
- Born: Scott Thomas Reeder; May 16, 1965 (age 61); Pomona, California, U.S.
- Genres: Desert rock; stoner rock; doom metal
- Occupation: Musician
- Instrument: Bass guitar
- Years active: 1990–present
- Member of: Fireball Ministry; Sun and Sail Club
- Formerly of: Across the River; Kyuss; The Obsessed; Unida

Scott Thomas Reeder (born May 16, 1965) is an American musician best known as the former bass player of stoner rock bands Across the River, Kyuss and The Obsessed, as well as the current bass player for Fireball Ministry.

== History ==
Scott Thomas Reeder was born in Pomona, California. In 1990 when Scott "Wino" Weinrich reformed The Obsessed, Reeder joined on bass and recorded two albums with the band including the landmark 1991 album Lunar Womb. Reeder left The Obsessed in 1992, and joined stoner rock band Kyuss who were without a bassist after the departure of Nick Oliveri. Reeder remained with Kyuss until they disbanded in 1995. After the breakup of Kyuss, Reeder auditioned for Tool but lost out to Justin Chancellor. He also formed a short-lived supergroup with Jason Newsted, Devin Townsend, and Dale Crover, though none of the group's recordings have ever been released.

In 2002, Reeder produced the British hard rock band Orange Goblin's album Coup De Grace, with former Kyuss vocalist John Garcia providing guest vocals on tracks "Made of Rats" and "Jesus Beater". In 2003, Reeder received a call from Lars Ulrich asking him to audition for Metallica after the departure of Jason Newsted, a position eventually won by Robert Trujillo. Short excerpts from Reeder's meeting with Metallica can be seen in the documentary Metallica: Some Kind of Monster.

Reeder handled production and bass duties for Bütcher and appeared on their album Auricle in 2005. He left the band in October 2006. He recently produced the album "Wyllt" for LA band, Black Math Horseman. In 2006, Reeder released his first solo album TunnelVision Brilliance on which he wrote and performed all tracks by himself.

In 2009, Reeder contributed to the Yawning Sons project, singing on the track "Garden Sessions III" on their album Ceremony to the Sunset.

In 2010, Reeder produced the Karma to Burn album Appalachian Incantation.

== Discography ==
=== Scott Reeder ===
- TunnelVision Brilliance (2006)

=== Kyuss ===
- Welcome to Sky Valley (1994)
- ...And the Circus Leaves Town (1995)
- "Shine!" (1996)
- "Into the Void" (1996)
- Kyuss/Queens of the Stone Age (split EP) (1997)
- Muchas Gracias: The Best of Kyuss (2000)

=== The Obsessed ===
- The Obsessed – Lunar Womb (1991)
- The Obsessed – Incarnate (1999)

=== Sun and Sail Club ===
- Mannequin (2013)
- The Great White Dope (2015)

=== Other ===
- Unida – El Coyote/The Great Divide (unreleased 2001)
- Goatsnake – Trampled Under Hoof (2004)
- Bütcher – Auricle (2005)
- The Freeks – The Freeks (2008)
- Ten East – The Robot's Guide to Freedom (2008)
- Yawning Sons – Ceremony to the Sunset (2009)
- Louise Patricia Crane – Deep Blue (2020)

=== As producer ===
- The Obsessed – Lunar Womb (1992)
- Sunn O))) – ØØ Void (2000)
- Orange Goblin – Coup de Grace (2002)
- Sixty Watt Shaman – Reason to Live (2002)
- Bütcher – Auricle (2005)
- Whores of Tijuana – Whores of Tijuana (2005)
- Dali's Llama – Sweet Sludge (2007)
- Dali's Llama – Full On Dunes (2008)
- Dali's Llama – Raw Is Real (2009)
- Black Math Horseman – Wyllt (2009)
- Blaak Heat Shujaa – Blaak Heat Shujaa (2010)
- Karma to Burn – Appalachian Incantation (2010)
- Whores of Tijuana – Psycholongevity (2010)
- Rise of The Willing – Dark Desert Tales (2012)
- Dali's Llama – "Autumn Woods" (2012)
- Blaak Heat Shujaa – The Storm Generation (2012)
- Solrize – Mano Cornuta (2012, Go Down Records)
- Blaak Heat Shujaa – The Edge of an Era (2013)
- Dali's Llama – Dying in the Sun (2016)

== Other appearances ==
- He covered a Kyuss song, "Demon Cleaner", on stage with Tool in 1998.
- He briefly joined the Los Angeles band Nebula and played several live shows with them in Southern California.
- In 2004, Reeder played bass on three tracks of the Goatsnake EP Trampled Under Hoof.
- In 2008, Reeder played bass on the Ten East album The Robot's Guide to Freedom.
- During the recording sessions for the Sixty Watt Shaman album Reason to Live, Reeder joined Sixty Watt Shaman, and former bandmate Scott "Wino" Weinrich for a live song recording of the song "All Things Come to Pass". Reeder played bass while Wino played guitar along with all of the members of Sixty Watt Shaman. The song was recorded live in one take.
- Reeder joined Kyuss Lives! in Europe in July 2011 to play four shows as a substitute for Nick Oliveri.
- Reeder was featured on the title track of Hungarian progressive metal band Angertea's Distrust EP.
- He played bass on the song "From Can to Can't" from the 2013 documentary film Sound City.
- Reeder was the recording engineer/co-producer for the Low Fly Incline album "Other Desert City" recorded in 2012 and released in 2014. Also contributed bass to the song "Three Cheers", and Talk-box to the song "Silver Cadillac".

== Gear ==
- Reeder has used various Rickenbacker 4001 basses, but changed to Ibanez ATK 300 basses later in his Kyuss career.
- He was endorsed by Ibanez and played a custom made ATK model.
- Currently, Reeder is endorsed by Warwick and uses a Thumb Bolt-On, Katana NT4, and a custom Katana NT8.
- With Kyuss, Reeder would often play through a vintage Ampeg SVT all-valve head, into one or two Ampeg 8x10" speaker cabinets.
- He is currently involved with different bands as a sound engineer (currently mixing Ten East's new songs).
- Reeder plays the bass left-handed, and consequently uses left-handed basses. Rather unusually, however, he strings them upside down. This is because he would play on his father's right-handed instruments when young.
- As of 2013, Reeder now plays a custom Warwick Katana bass. Designed to his left-hand specification but still strung in reverse.
