= Kyuss =

American stoner rock band

- Kyuss c. 1992. Left to right: Josh Homme, Brant Bjork, John Garcia, Nick Oliveri.

Background information
- Also known as: Katzenjammer (1987–1989); Sons of Kyuss (1989–1991)
- Origin: Palm Desert, California, U.S.
- Genres: Stoner rock; desert rock; stoner metal
- Works: Kyuss discography
- Years active: 1987–1995
- Labels: Dali; Chameleon; Elektra; Bong Load; Man's Ruin
- Spinoffs: Vista Chino; Queens of the Stone Age; Mondo Generator; Ché; Unida; Hermano; Slo Burn; The Desert Sessions; Eagles of Death Metal; Ten East; Stöner
- Past members: Josh Homme; John Garcia; Scott Reeder; Alfredo Hernández; Chris Cockrell; Brant Bjork; Nick Oliveri

Kyuss (/ˈkaɪəs/ KY-əs) was an American stoner rock band formed in Palm Desert, California, in 1987. They are considered one of the pioneers of the genre. After disbanding in 1995, a number of band members have gone on to form or play in several notable bands including Queens of the Stone Age, Screaming Trees, Fu Manchu, Dwarves, Eagles of Death Metal, Mondo Generator, Hermano, Unida, Slo Burn and Them Crooked Vultures.

In November 2010, three former members of the band (minus Homme, who declined to participate) reunited under the adapted moniker "Kyuss Lives!" for a world tour with plans to record a new album. A federal lawsuit subsequently filed by Homme resulted in Oliveri leaving the band in March 2012. Five months later, a court ruled that Garcia and Bjork were not allowed to release audio recordings under the Kyuss Lives! moniker. As a result, they changed their name to Vista Chino.

== History ==
=== As Katzenjammer and Sons of Kyuss (1987–1991) ===
The band formed in 1987 jamming under the name Katzenjammer (German slangword for "Hangover" [archaic], literally "moaning of a cat") before eventually deciding upon Sons of Kyuss. Brant Bjork selected the name from the undead monster found in the Advanced Dungeons & Dragons roleplaying game. In 1989 the band recorded their eponymous debut EP, Sons of Kyuss, which was their only release to feature Chris Cockrell on bass. After self-releasing the EP in 1990, the band recruited Nick Oliveri – who had previously played second guitar in Katzenjammer – to replace Cockrell on bass, and shortened their name to Kyuss.

=== As Kyuss (1991–1995) ===
Kyuss' first line-up consisted of vocalist John Garcia, guitarist Josh Homme, bassist Nick Oliveri and drummer Brant Bjork. The band gradually built a local following in Palm Desert, California and frequently performed at parties in and around the isolated towns of Southern California's desert areas. These impromptu and predominantly outdoor shows, referred to locally as "generator parties", consisted of small crowds of people, beer drinking, and the use of gasoline-powered generators to provide electricity for the equipment. Homme commented that playing in the desert "was the shaping factor for the band" noting that "there's no clubs here, so you can only play for free. If people don't like you, they'll tell you. You can't suck."

The band then signed with independent record label Dali, a subsidiary of the Elektra Records-distributed Chameleon Records, who released their debut album, Wretch, in September 1991. Several songs on the album were re-recorded versions of those that appeared on the Sons of Kyuss EP. Album sales were sluggish, though the band was quickly making a name for itself as a live act. Guitarist Josh Homme soon gained a reputation for his unique downtuned, psychedelic style of guitar playing, and his convention of playing electric guitars through bass guitar amplifiers to create a bass-heavy sound.

In 1992, the band, along with new producer Chris Goss, began work on their next album, Blues for the Red Sun. Goss understood the band, and was able to accurately capture their live sound in the studio. Released in June that year, the album was critically hailed and is today widely regarded as a pioneering stoner rock record. By the end of 1993, they were invited to open nine dates for Metallica touring Australia. Comparisons to stoner rock godfathers Black Sabbath became common, though Homme claimed to have little knowledge of the band at the time but Bjork asserted he and Oliveri were hugely influenced by the British group. Oliveri left the band following completion of the album and Scott Reeder, who had been approached about joining Kyuss five to six months earlier during a West Coast tour with The Obsessed, made his debut at the release party for Blues for the Red Sun.

In 1993, Kyuss were moved from Dali to the main Chameleon label, and recorded their third album, Welcome to Sky Valley. Once again produced by Chris Goss, it demonstrated a much more psychedelic and mature sound. However, personal problems emerged and drummer Brant Bjork left the band following completion of the recording sessions. Bjork cited his extreme distaste for touring, particularly band relationship problems that develop during long periods on the road. He was replaced by Alfredo Hernández, who had previously played with Reeder in the band Across the River during the mid-80s. The album was initially scheduled to be released in January 1994, but Chameleon went under in November 1993. Elektra opted to pick up the band's contract from Chameleon, and issued the album in June 1994 to critical acclaim. One of the album's singles, "Demon Cleaner", reached number 78 on the UK Singles Chart.

"Thee Ol' Boozeroony"
Sample of "Thee Ol' Boozeroony", from ...And the Circus Leaves Town

In July 1995, Kyuss released their fourth and final album, ...And the Circus Leaves Town. The band's only album recorded for a major label, it featured a simpler sound, in contrast to the instrumentally based Welcome to Sky Valley. "One Inch Man" was released as the album's only single in June 1995, and a music video was also made for the song. The album was not as successful commercially as Sky Valley, receiving mixed reviews. Kyuss broke up during the late summer of 1995.

After the band's breakup in 1995, there had been frequent and persistent speculation among fans regarding the possibility of a Kyuss reunion. When asked in late 2004 about whether the band would ever re-unite, Homme replied that this was unlikely to happen in the near future. However, on December 20, 2005, Garcia made a guest appearance onstage with Queens of the Stone Age during their encore at the Wiltern LG in Los Angeles. They performed three Kyuss songs together: "Thumb", "Hurricane" and "Supa Scoopa and Mighty Scoop". The band has reportedly received numerous offers to reform, all of which have been turned down:

"The offers come in all the time. They're getting more and more expensive, and more and more elaborate. The money is crazy, but I've never been tempted – I don't really care about the money, I never have. That's not what KYUSS was about, so to punctuate the end of our sentence with that would be blasphemy. KYUSS fans are so fuckin' rad, they're fuckin' badass – but to me, reunions are just not necessary. It's not what it was, it's what it is, and KYUSS was a really magical thing – and if you weren't there, well, you weren't. That's just the luck of the draw. I don't feel the urge to do it for somebody who didn't have the opportunity to see us, or just didn't take the opportunity to see us. I'll let other bands alter their great legacies. KYUSS has such a great history that it would be a total error. I like that nobody saw KYUSS, and that it was largely misunderstood. That sounds like a legend forming to me. I'm too proud of it to rub my dick on it."

— Josh Homme to Joel McIver, May 2007

Scott Reeder also commented on a possible Kyuss reunion in early 2008, saying "I think everyone but Josh would do it in a heartbeat". Reeder also noted that he would "do it for free beer again".

=== Post-breakup (1996–present) ===
Shortly after the breakup, Homme toured as the rhythm guitarist with Screaming Trees and began work on ongoing The Desert Sessions recording series. In December 1997, a transitional split EP was released, featuring three songs by Kyuss (the Black Sabbath cover "Into the Void," "Fatso Forgotso", and "Flip the Phase") and three songs by Queens of the Stone Age ("If Only Everything", "Born to Hula" and "Spiders & Vinegaroons"). Homme and Hernandez formed Queens of the Stone Age in 1998, and recruited Oliveri as bassist after completion of their debut album.

Hernandez later played with Yawning Man, Ché and Orquesta del Desierto, while Oliveri formed the band Mondo Generator, named after the only Kyuss song credited solely (words and music) to him. Drummer Brant Bjork went on to form the band Brant Bjork and the Bros, recorded and performed with Fu Manchu and Mondo Generator, and has recorded several solo albums.

John Garcia went on to form Slo Burn, although the band was short-lived and released only one EP, Amusing the Amazing, before disbanding in September 1997. He was also briefly associated with the band Karma to Burn. In 1998, he began working with the band Unida, recording one EP, one LP and an unreleased album. At the same time he started working with the band Hermano, having released three LP's and one live album to date. Garcia had more recently been working on a solo album.

In 1997, Homme, Bjork, and Oliveri recorded three songs together ("13th Floor", "Simple Exploding Man", and "Cocaine Rodeo") for Mondo Generator's debut album Cocaine Rodeo, released in 2000. Also featuring Garcia and Chris Goss on one track, the songs are regarded by many fans as the true final Kyuss recordings.

In 2000, a compilation album, Muchas Gracias: The Best of Kyuss, was released. The album is a collection of the band's singles, as well as B-sides and live material.

Although Kyuss left behind some "rarities", many of them were released on Muchas Gracias, and further releases from the band appear unlikely. Singer John Garcia told Billboard in a 2005 interview:

"There are so many untitled songs that have never been heard, that I have up in my little crawl space up above my bed. I don't see those songs coming out anytime in the near future. Everybody's too busy to do stuff like that. It's a job to go back and listen to it, and then if you want to re-record them."

In 2010, a European "John Garcia plays Kyuss" tour was announced. In June 2010, former Kyuss members Nick Oliveri and Brant Bjork joined Garcia onstage to perform "Green Machine" and "Gardenia" during a headlining appearance by "Garcia Plays Kyuss" at Hellfest in Clisson, France, and they also appeared onstage with Garcia in other concerts on the tour.

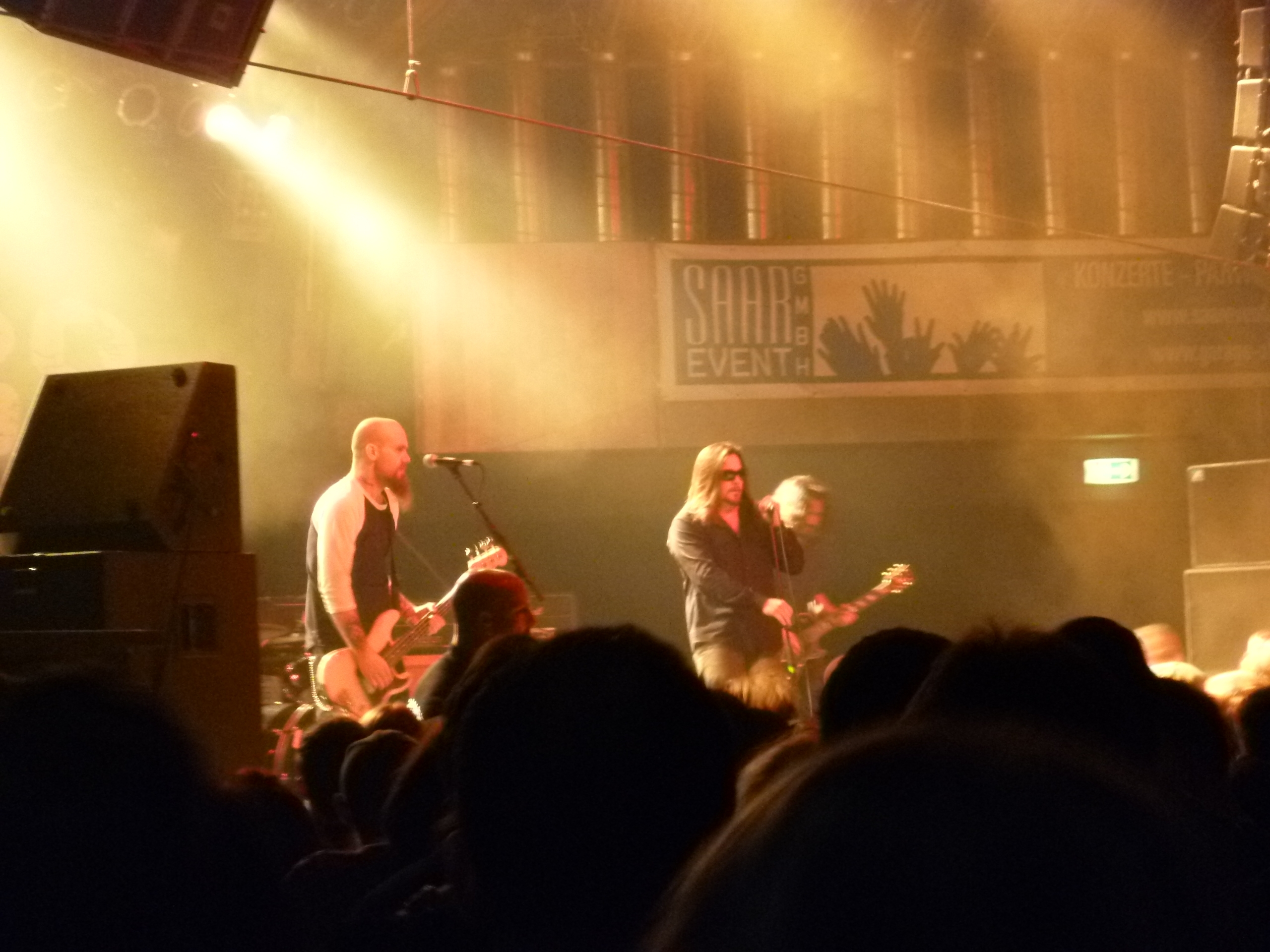
Kyuss Lives! in 2011

In November 2010, Garcia, Oliveri and Bjork announced plans to tour under the moniker "Kyuss Lives!" with guitarist Bruno Fevery. In reference to the new band name, Garcia stated that "there is never going to be a Kyuss without Josh Homme" and that "hopefully in the future him and I can get together and do some writing." The band went on to tour Europe, Australia, New Zealand, and North and South America. The band then announced plans to record a new studio album for a summer 2012 release in addition to a live album.

However, in March 2012, it was revealed that Josh Homme, after persuading bassist Scott Reeder to support him, had filed a federal lawsuit against John Garcia and Brant Bjork alleging "trademark infringement and consumer fraud" over the use of the Kyuss name despite the fact Brant Bjork had originally created the name. Nick Oliveri left the project later that month after it was revealed that Garcia and Bjork had tried to take control of the Kyuss trademark.

In August 2012, the courts ruled that Garcia and Bjork could not release any recordings, studio or live, under the Kyuss Lives! moniker. While they were allowed to continue using the moniker for live shows (as long as, unlike the band's current logo, Lives! is written in the same size and next to the word Kyuss to avoid confusion), the judge stated that they may face issues in the future and that "it may be in Defendants' best interest to begin re-branding under a new name". On November 29, 2012, it was announced that Kyuss Lives! had changed their name to Vista Chino.

In July 2020, Homme stated that he was open to the possibility of participating in a Kyuss reunion. "There have been times I thought it cannot end that way, and the only real way to end it correctly now would be to play." In 2021, Bjork stated he had reached out to Homme in regards to his comments, however, the probability of a reunion has been put into question due to a lack of communication from Homme.

== Style and legacy ==
Kyuss are considered pioneers of stoner rock in the 1990s. Eduardo Rivadavia of AllMusic described the band's sound as a "combination of sludgy, down-tuned guitars, spacey jams, galloping thrash metal rhythms, and organic drums." Guitarist Josh Homme used C tuning and played his guitar through a bass cabinet "for maximum, earth-shaking intensity."

Kyuss is compared to The Velvet Underground in hard rock and heavy metal circles, in part due to their limited commercial success in spite of their insurmountable influence.

The band cited influences including Masters of Reality, Fatso Jetson, Black Sabbath, Cream, Deep Purple, Led Zeppelin, Jimi Hendrix, the Stooges, Soundgarden, Alice in Chains, the Melvins, Mudhoney, Screaming Trees, Meat Puppets, Metallica, Discharge, Black Flag and the Cult.

== Band members ==
- Josh Homme – guitars, backing vocals (1987–1995)
- John Garcia – lead vocals (1987–1995)
- Brant Bjork – drums, percussion (1987–1994)
- Chris Cockrell – bass (1987–1991)
- Nick Oliveri – rhythm guitar (1987–1988), bass, backing and lead vocals (1991–1992)
- Scott Reeder – bass, backing vocals (1992–1995)
- Alfredo Hernández – drums, percussion (1994–1995)

=== Lineups ===
1987–1989 Katzenjammer	John Garcia – lead vocals; Josh Homme – lead guitar, backing vocals; Nick Oliveri – rhythm guitar; Chris Cockrell – bass; Brant Bjork – drums, percussion
1989–1991 Sons of Kyuss	John Garcia – lead vocals; Josh Homme – guitars, backing vocals; Chris Cockrell – bass; Brant Bjork – drums, percussion
1991–1992	John Garcia – lead vocals; Josh Homme – guitars, backing vocals; Nick Oliveri – bass, vocals; Brant Bjork – drums, percussion
1992–1994	John Garcia – lead vocals; Josh Homme – guitars, backing vocals; Scott Reeder – bass, backing vocals; Brant Bjork – drums, percussion
1994–1995	John Garcia – lead vocals; Josh Homme – guitars, backing vocals; Scott Reeder – bass, backing vocals; Alfredo Hernández – drums, percussion

== Discography ==
- Wretch (1991)
- Blues for the Red Sun (1992)
- Welcome to Sky Valley (1994)
- ...And the Circus Leaves Town (1995)
