= Return to Earth 91–93 =

Return to Earth 91-93

Compilation album by Fu Manchu
- Released: October 27, 1998
- Recorded: October 25, 1991 – August 19, 1992
- Genre: Stoner rock
- Length: 27:54
- Label: Elastic Records

Fu Manchu chronology
The Action Is Go (1997)	Return to Earth 91-93 (1998)	Eatin' Dust (1999)

Professional ratings
Review scores
Source	Rating
AllMusic	3.0/5 stars

Return to Earth 91–93 is a compilation album by California stoner rock band Fu Manchu, released in 1998 on Elastic Records. The album is a collection of three early singles released in 1992, along with two bonus songs. The band features Scott Votaw on lead guitar before he was replaced by Eddie Glass on the debut album. This compilation has more of a gritty and punk edge to it than their later albums did.

== Track listing ==
1. "Don't Bother Knockin' (If This Van's Rockin')" – 3:55
2. "Senioritis" – 2:42
3. "Pick-Up Summer" – 2:33
4. "El Don" – 2:23
5. "Ojo Rojo" – 3:44
6. "Simco" – 3:08
7. "Space Sucker" – 3:05
8. "Pinbuster" – 2:14
9. "Vankhana (Rollin' Rooms)" – 4:16
- Tracks 1 and 7 originally appeared on the "Don't Bother Knockin' (If This Van's Rockin')" single.
- Tracks 2, 4 and 8 originally appeared on the "Senioritis" single.
- Tracks 3 and 9 originally appeared on the "Pick-Up Summer" single.
- An alternative version of track 5 ("Ojo Rojo") appears on No One Rides for Free.
- "Simco" originally appeared on Goar Records' "EP #7" compilation.
