= Asphalt Risin' =

Single by Fu Manchu

from the album In Search of...
- B-side: "Chevy Van"
- Released: 1996 (US)
- Recorded: September 1995
- Studio: Grandmaster Recorders, Ltd. in Hollywood, California
- Genre: Stoner rock
- Length: 3:13
- Label: Mammoth Records
- Songwriter(s): Brad Davis, Eddie Glass, Scott Hill, Ruben Romano
- Producer(s): Fu Manchu & Brian Jenkins

Fu Manchu singles chronology
"Missing Link" (1996)	"Asphalt Risin'" (1996)	"Jailbreak" (1998)

"Asphalt Risin'" is a song by American stoner rock band Fu Manchu. It was released as a single in 1996 by Mammoth Records – the first of two single releases off the album In Search of.... The B-side was a rendition of the 1975 song "Chevy Van" which was originally written and performed by Sammy Johns. It was featured in and on the soundtrack of the 1977 film The Van, in which the main character drove around in a retrofitted custom van.

== Reception ==
Dave Pehling from CBS news listed this song alongside the In Search of... track "Regal Begal" as the standouts which made the album it came from, "a bonafide classic of the genre" which he described as a "downtuned, psychedelic style of heavy stoner rock" created with "enormous fuzzed-out riffs."

Representing Classic Rock magazine, Malcolm Dome noted the "decisive edge" that lead guitarist Eddie Glass and drummer Ruben Romano contributed to the tracks "Asphalt Risin'" and "Seahag" as a reason for inclusion in the article, "10 stoner rock albums you should definitely own."

Bearing to the longevity of the song's composition Curtis Craig from AllMusic, commenting on the live version from the bands 2003 Go for It... Live! album that, "it's songs from early albums that shine like a sparkly GTO paint job" noting that "Asphalt Risin'" in particular "rumbles through shifting gears of fuzz."

== Track listing ==
7" vinyl 1996 (MR0139-7)

1. "Asphalt Risin'" – 3:11
2. "Chevy Van" – 3:22 (Sammy Johns)

== Personnel ==
- Scott Hill – vocals, guitar, producer
- Ruben Romano – drums, producer
- Eddie Glass – guitar, producer
- Brad Davis – bass, producer

== Charts ==
Chart (1996)	Peak position
UK Rock & Metal (OCC)	21
