= Live at Roadburn 2003 =

Live album by Fu Manchu
- Released: December 29, 2019
- Recorded: June 27, 2003
- Venue: Effenaar
- Genre: Stoner rock
- Length: 40:16
- Label: At the Dojo
- Producer: Fu Manchu

Fu Manchu chronology
Clone of the Universe (2018)	Live at Roadburn 2003 (2019)	A Look Back : Dogtown & Z-Boys (2021)

Poster of the event

Live at Roadburn 2003 is a live album by American stoner rock band Fu Manchu. It documents their performance at the Roadburn Festival 2003 edition which was held at the Effenaar music venue located in Eindhoven, Netherlands. Also playing the festival were the rock acts 35007, Firebird and Astrosoniq. Walter Hoeijmakers, the music journalist who organized the festival, shared why he chose the band for the festival stating, "Fu Manchu is one of the standard bearers of the genre. The band evokes the relaxed atmosphere of the American West Coast with its music: skating, surfing, cruising and hanging out in arcades."

It was released through the record label At the Dojo Records as a Record Store Day special release in 2019. The setlist included "I Wanna Be" and "Written In Stone" which were new songs that weren't yet recorded. The bands lead vocalist and guitar player Scott Hill shared how the listeners were able to see into the creative process of the musicians crafting their work in progress music by stating, "It was the year before we put out Start the Machine and we played a couple of songs from it live for the first time on that tour. One of the songs that's on this live record, "I Wanna Be," is a different arrangement than what ended up on the final studio release."

== Track listing ==
No.	Title	Length
1.	"Squash That Fly"	3:42
2.	"Hell on Wheels"	4:14
3.	"Eatin' Dust"	3:10
4.	"Laserbl'ast!"	3:07
5.	"I Wanna Be"	3:38
6.	"Boogie Van"	4:28
7.	"King of the Road"	4:25
8.	"Written in Stone"	3:24
9.	"Saturn III"	10:03
Total length:		40:16

== Personnel ==
- Scott Hill – vocals, guitar
- Bob Balch – guitar
- Brad Davis – bass
- Scott Reeder – drums

Production

- Live sound – Brian "Curly" Engel
- Recording/mixing – VPRO
- Mastering – Carl Saff
- Cover artwork – Ernie Parada
