= Fu Manchu/Fatso Jetson split =

"Jailbreak"

Single by Fu Manchu
- Released: 1998
- Genre: Stoner rock
- Label: Sessions Records
- Songwriter(s): Thin Lizzy
- Producer(s): J. Yuenger

Fu Manchu singles chronology
"Asphalt Risin'" (1996)	"Jailbreak" (1998)	"Something Beyond" (2003)

Fu Manchu / Fatso Jetson is a split 7-inch from 1998 featuring the American stoner rock bands Fu Manchu and Fatso Jetson. The Fu Manchu side contains a cover of the Thin Lizzy song "Jailbreak".

== Track listing ==
=== Fu Manchu ===
1. "Jailbreak"

=== Fatso Jetson ===
1. "Blueberries and Chrome"

The song "Jailbreak" was later released as a CD single with a different cover and two more songs: "Urethane" from The Action Is Go and a live version of "Coyote Duster" from the Dynamo Open Air. "Coyote Duster" was originally released on Daredevil. The version of "Jailbreak" that appears on the CD is also a remastered version.

== CD track listing ==
1. "Jailbreak"
2. "Urethane"
3. "Coyote Duster" (live)

"Jailbreak" was a "test recording" with J. Yuenger of White Zombie to determine if they would get along. (This was stated by Scott Hill in an interview.) They apparently did, as Yuenger later produced their album, The Action Is Go.

Both versions of "Jailbreak" are out of print.
