= Dos EPs =

Compilation album by Nebula
- Released: May 28, 2002
- Recorded: June 1998 – December 2001
- Venues: The Crocodile, Seattle, Washington (tracks 12, 13)
- Studios: Private Radio Studios, Seattle, Washington (tracks 1, 2, 4, 5, 7); LoHo Studios, New York City (tracks 3, 6, 8); Donner & Blitzen Studios, Los Angeles, California (tracks 9–11)
- Genres: Stoner rock; psychedelic rock
- Length: 47:38
- Labels: MeteorCity; Heavy Psych Sounds (2018 reissue)

Nebula chronology
Charged (2001)	Dos EPs (2002)	Atomic Ritual (2003)

Professional ratings
Review scores
Source	Rating
AllMusic	4/5 stars
Classic Rock	7/10
Exclaim!	(positive)
Indieville	88/100
Myglobalmind	9/10
New Noise Magazine	4.5/5 stars

Dos EPs is the first compilation album by the American stoner rock band Nebula. It was released on May 28, 2002, by MeteorCity, and later reissued in 2018 by the band's current label, Heavy Psych Sounds Records. The album contains songs from the Nebula/Lowrider and Sun Creature EPs, as well as three new tracks.

== Track listing ==
All tracks are written by Nebula. All music by Eddie Glass

Original release
No.	Title	Length
1.	"Rocket"	3:42
2.	"Long Day"	3:32
3.	"Bardo Airways"	2:37
4.	"Anything from You"	3:56
5.	"Rollin' My Way to Freedom"	5:12
6.	"Fall of Icarus"	4:11
7.	"Smokin' Woman"	5:28
8.	"Fly On"	6:54
9.	"Full Throttle"	4:08
10.	"Sun Creature"	3:34
11.	"Back to the Dawn"	4:17

2018 reissue bonus tracks
No.	Title	Length
12.	"Anything from You" (live)	4:43
13.	"Rollin' My Way to Freedom" (live)	4:38

Notes

- Tracks 1–3 were previously unreleased.
- Tracks 4, 6, 9 and 11 are from Nebula/Lowrider.
- Tracks 5, 7, 8 and 10 are from Sun Creature.
- Tracks 5, 7, 8, 10 and 11 were remixed for the release.

== Personnel ==
Credits adapted from album's liner notes.

- Eddie Glass – guitar, vocals, Fender Rhodes
- Ruben Romano – drums, vocals
- Mark Abshire – bass

Additional personnel

- Mathias Schneeberger – Fender Rhodes (tracks 6, 8, 10)
