= We Must Obey =

Studio album by Fu Manchu
- Released: February 19, 2007
- Recorded: August 2006
- Studios: Grandmaster, Hollywood, California
- Genre: Stoner rock
- Length: 36:25
- Labels: Liquor and Poker, Century Media
- Producers: Fu Manchu, Andrew Alekel

Fu Manchu chronology
Start the Machine (2004)	We Must Obey (2007)	Signs of Infinite Power (2009)

Singles from We Must Obey
- 1. "Hung Out to Dry" Released: January 30, 2007

Professional ratings
Review scores
Source	Rating
AllMusic	3.5/5 stars
PopMatters	7/10
Spin	3/5 stars

We Must Obey is the ninth studio album by the southern California stoner rock band Fu Manchu. It was released on February 19, 2007, and features a cover of the Cars' "Moving in Stereo."

== Track listing ==
No.	Title	Length
1.	"We Must Obey"	3:12
2.	"Knew it All Along"	3:11
3.	"Let Me Out"	3:08
4.	"Hung Out to Dry"	3:25
5.	"Shake It Loose"	4:12
6.	"Land of Giants"	3:56
7.	"Between the Lines"	1:32
8.	"Lesson"	3:20
9.	"Moving in Stereo" (The Cars cover)	2:42
10.	"Didn't Really Try"	2:51
11.	"Sensei Vs. Sensei"	4:56

European bonus track
No.	Title	Length
12.	"Never Again"

== Personnel ==
- Scott Hill – vocals, guitar
- Bob Balch – guitar
- Brad Davis – bass, theremin
- Scott Reeder – drums

Production

- Andrew Alekel – producer
- Fu Manchu – producer
