= Atomic Ritual =

Studio album by Nebula
- Released: September 23, 2003
- Recorded: 2002
- Genre: Stoner rock; desert rock
- Length: 51:04
- Label: Liquor and Poker; Sweet Nothing; Heavy Psych Sounds (2022 reissue)
- Producer: Chris Goss

Nebula chronology
Dos EPs (2002)	Atomic Ritual (2003)	Apollo (2006)

Atomic Ritual is the third studio album by the American stoner rock band Nebula. It was released on September 23, 2003, by Liquor and Poker and Sweet Nothing Records. The album was reissued in 2022 by the band's current label, Heavy Psych Sounds Records.

== Reception ==
Professional ratings
Review scores
Source	Rating
AllMusic	4/5 stars
Entertainment Weekly	A−
Exclaim!	(positive)
KNAC.com	3.5/5 stars
Uncut	1.5/5 stars

Atomic Ritual was released to mostly positive reviews from critics. AllMusic called Nebula a "hard-working power trio [that] sounds like it has been hanging out in the garage since 1973, blissfully unaware of the changing world outside. Which is definitely to its benefit".

== Track listing ==
All songs written by Eddie Glass and Ruben Romano except where noted.

1. "Atomic Ritual" – 4:14
2. "So It Goes" (Ruben Romano) – 3:54
3. "Carpe Diem" – 4:21
4. "More" (Glass, Judgement of Paris) – 3:15
5. "The Beast" – 3:35
6. "Out of Your Head" – 4:11
7. "The Way to Venus" – 2:46
8. "Paradise Engineer" – 4:10
9. "Electric Synapse" – 3:00
10. "Strange Human" – 5:05
11. "Fin" (Ruben Romano) – 2:43
12. "Atomic Ritual Revisited" – 9:13 (hidden track)

== Personnel ==
- Eddie Glass – guitar, vocals, keyboards, bass, drums, percussion
- Ruben Romano – drums, vocals, keyboards, guitar, percussion, artwork
- Simon Moon – bass

== Trivia ==
Some copies of the CD come with a Liquor and Poker sticker. On one of the flaps of the album case there are 5 lines of text reading:

- "In the years of the Primal Course, in the dawn of terrestrial birth,
  Man Mastered the mammoth and horse, and Man was the lord of the earth."
- "He made him a hollow skin from the heart of a holy tree,
  He compassed the earth therein, and Man was lord of the Sea."
- "He controlled the vigour of steam, he harnessed the lightning for hire;
  He drove the celestial team, and Man was the lord of Fire."
- "Deep-mouthed from their thrones deep-seated, the choirs of the aeons declare
  The last of the demons defeated, for Man is the lorde of the Air."
- "Arise, O Man, in thy strength! the kingdom is thine to inherit
  Till the high gods witness at length that Man is the lord of his spirit."

Underneath this the initials A.C. are printed. These are the initials of occultist Aleister Crowley, the author. This is not Nebula's only Aleister Crowley reference; their MySpace tagline is a direct quote from Crowley: "Do what thou wilt, shall be the whole of the law."

"So It Goes" is featured on the soundtrack to Tony Hawk's Underground 2. It also contains references to Kurt Vonnegut's book Slaughterhouse-Five.
