= Idle Hands (disambiguation) =

Idle Hands is a 1999 American comedy horror film directed by Rodman Flender.

Idle Hands may also refer to:

== Entertainment ==
- Idle Hands (Tim Ryan album), a 1993 album by Tim Ryan Rouillier
- "Idle Hands", a song from the 2002 album Stone Sour by Stone Sour
- "Idle Hands", a song from the 2015 album The Young Souls by Myka Relocate
- Idle Hands (Fatso Jetson album), a 2016 album by Fatso Jetson

== See also ==
- Unto Others, the band formerly known as Idle Hands
- "Idle Nuts", a segment from the 2006 episode "Dragon Nuts", from the second season of the stop-motion television series Robot Chicken
