= Signs of Infinite Power =

Studio album by Fu Manchu
- Released: October 20, 2009
- Recorded: June 2009
- Studio: Maple Sound Studios, Santa Ana, California
- Genre: Stoner rock
- Length: 34:22
- Label: Century Media; At the Dojo
- Producer: Fu Manchu & Sergio Chavez

Fu Manchu chronology
We Must Obey (2007)	Signs of Infinite Power (2009)	Gigantoid (2014)

Professional ratings
Review scores
Source	Rating
AllMusic	4/5 stars

Signs of Infinite Power is the tenth studio album by the southern California stoner rock band Fu Manchu. It was released on October 20, 2009, by Century Media Records.

== Track listing ==
No.	Title	Length
1.	"Bionic Astronautics"	3:44
2.	"Steel.Beast.Defeated"	3:48
3.	"Against the Ground"	3:20
4.	"Webfoot Witch Hat"	4:32
5.	"El Busta"	3:18
6.	"Signs of Infinite Power"	4:11
7.	"Eyes x 10"	2:22
8.	"Gargantuan March"	3:41
9.	"Take It Away"	3:20
10.	"One Step Too Far"	2:13

== Personnel ==
- Scott Hill – vocals, guitar
- Bob Balch – guitar
- Brad Davis – bass
- Scott Reeder – drums

Production

- Sergio Chavez – producer
- Fu Manchu – producer
