= Toasted (album) =

Studio album by Fatso Jetson
- Released: January 1, 2001
- Recorded: April 1998
- Genre: Stoner rock; desert rock
- Length: 40:13
- Label: Bong Load Custom
- Producer: Chris Goss

Fatso Jetson chronology
Flames for All (1999)	Toasted (2001)	Cruel & Delicious (2002)

Professional ratings
Review scores
Source	Rating
AllMusic	4/5 stars

Toasted is the fourth album from Fatso Jetson, released on Bong Load Custom Records. Originally recorded in 1998, it wasn't completely released until 2001. This album was re-issued on LP in 2012 for the European Tour.

== Track listing ==
No.	Title	Length
1.	"New Age Android"	4:33
2.	"Magma"	5:57
3.	"I've Got the Shame"	2:27
4.	"She's so Borg"	4:38
5.	"Swollen Offering"	5:53
6.	"Tutta Dorma"	4:35
7.	"Rail Job"	1:45
8.	"Procrastination Process"	3:46
9.	"Too Many Skulls"	6:39

== Personnel ==
- Mario Lalli – guitar, vocals
- Tony Tornay – drums
- Larry Lalli – bass
- Chris Goss – producer
