= In Search of... =

In Search of may refer to:

- In Search of... (TV series), an American documentary television series, on air 1977–1982, revived in 2002 and 2018.
- In Search of... (N.E.R.D. album), 2001
- In Search of... (Fu Manchu album), 1996
