= Start the Machine =

Start the Machine may refer to:

- Start the Machine (film), a documentary that focuses on the break-up of Blink-182
- Start the Machine (album), a 2004 album by Fu Manchu
