= Olivelawn =

American punk rock band

- Origin: San Diego, California, U.S.
- Genres: Punk rock
- Years active: 1990–1992
- Labels: Headhunter, Nemesis
- Spinoffs: Fluf
- Past members: Mike Olson; O (Otis Barthoulameu); Eddie Glass; Jonny Donhowe

Olivelawn was an American punk rock band from San Diego, California, that released two albums in the early 1990s.

== History ==
Olivelawn was composed of singer Mike Olson, guitarist O. (a.k.a. Otis Barthoulameu) and the rhythm section of drummer Eddie Glass and bassist Neil Blender. Jonny Donhowe replaced Blender on bass after the group had released one single. Identified influences include The Stooges, Black Sabbath, and the MC5. After three singles, the group released their debut album, Sap, on Nemesis Records in 1991, and following it with their second album, Sophomore Jinx! on Headhunter Records in 1992. Sophomore Jinx! was recorded in Seattle and produced by Jack Endino. This was their final release, with O and Donhowe going on to form Fluf, and Glass joining the band Fu Manchu in 1993 as lead guitarist. Glass founded the power trio Nebula in 1996, playing guitar.

The band took its name from the Olive Lawn Memorial Park in La Mirada, California, which was near their rehearsal space.

Barthoulameu died in February 2023.

== Discography ==
=== Albums ===
- Sap (1991), Nemesis
- Sophomore Jinx! (1992), Headhunter

=== Singles ===
- "4 Is Greater Than 2" (1990), Nemesis
- "Instant Punk Rock Song" (1990), Insta-Noise
- "Cat's Farm" (1990), Nemesis
- Split single with Jack of Hearts (1990), No Guff: "Symptom Of The Universe (Live)"
- "Beautiful Feeling" (1991), Sympathy for the Record Industry
