= Hung Out to Dry =

Hung Out to Dry may refer to:

- "Hung Out to Dry" (song), a 2006 song by Fu Manchu
- "Hung Out to Dry" (NCIS), the second episode of the first season of the crime drama television series NCIS
- "Hung Out to Dry" (CSI: NY episode), the fourth episode of the third season of the crime drama television series CSI: NY
