= Daredevil (Fu Manchu album) =

Studio album by Fu Manchu
- Released: January 1, 1995
- Recorded: August 1994
- Studio: The Shop in Humboldt County, California
- Genre: Stoner rock
- Length: 43:36
- Label: Bong Load Records
- Producer: Tom Rothrock, Rob Schnapf and Fu Manchu

Fu Manchu chronology
No One Rides for Free (1994)	Daredevil (1995)	In Search of... (1996)

Professional ratings
Review scores
Source	Rating
AllMusic	2.5/5 stars

Daredevil is the second studio release from Fu Manchu, a Southern Californian stoner rock band, released on the Bong Load Custom Records label in 1995. A remastered version of the album was released in 2015.

== Track listing ==
No.	Title	Length
1.	"Trapeze Freak"	4:18
2.	"Tilt"	3:00
3.	"Gathering Speed"	4:22
4.	"Coyote Duster"	2:51
5.	"Travel Agent"	4:12
6.	"Sleestak"	3:42
7.	"Space Farm"	5:30
8.	"Lug"	3:29
9.	"Egor"	3:36
10.	"Wurkin'"	3:37
11.	"Push Button Magic"	4:56

== Personnel ==
- Scott Hill – guitar, vocals, producer
- Ruben Romano – drums, producer
- Eddie Glass – guitar, producer
- Brad Davis – bass, producer

Additional personnel

- Tom Rothrock – producer
- Rob Schnapf – producer

== Credits ==
Engineered and mixed by Rob and Tom. Assisted by Dennis Brower
Mastered by Stephan Marcussen
Cover photography by Gary Gladstone 1972
Fu Manchu photographed by Lisa Johnson
All songs by Fu Manchu © 1995 Van-O-Rama Music/ASCAP
Project coordination by Surfer Brad
