= Let It Burn (Nebula album) =

EP by Nebula
- Released: October 20, 1998
- Recorded: May 1997; June 1998
- Studio: Rancho de la Luna, Joshua Tree, California; LoHo Studios, New York City
- Genre: Stoner rock; psychedelic rock
- Length: 34:49
- Label: Tee Pee; Relapse; Heavy Psych Sounds (2018 reissue)
- Producer: Nebula

Nebula chronology
Let It Burn (1998)	Sun Creature (1999)

Professional ratings
Review scores
Source	Rating
AllMusic	3/5 stars
Classic Rock	7/10
Myglobalmind	9/10
New Noise Magazine	4.5/5 stars

Let It Burn is the debut EP by the American stoner rock band Nebula. It features a more psychedelic experimental sound as opposed to the straightforward approach of Eddie Glass' former band Fu Manchu. It was out of print until re-released in 2018 by Heavy Psych Sounds Records.

== Track listing ==
All tracks are written by Eddie Glass and Ruben Romano. All music by Glass

2018 reissue
No.	Title	Length
1.	"Elevation"	2:56
2.	"Down the Highway"	3:18
3.	"Let It Burn"	4:52
4.	"Vulcan Bomber"	2:55
5.	"Dragon Eye"	3:25
6.	"Raga in the Bloodshot Pyramid"	5:09
7.	"Sonic Titan"	7:40
8.	"Devil's Liquid"	4:29

Bonus tracks
No.	Title	Length
9.	"Let It Burn" (Live at Roskilde Festival)	5:10
10.	"Devil's Liquid" (Demo Version)	4:45

== Personnel ==
- Eddie Glass – guitar, vocals, percussion
- Ruben Romano – drums, percussion, sitar
- Mark Abshire – bass
