= Staring at the Sun =

Staring at the Sun may refer to:

== Music ==
- Staring at the Sun (Level 42 album), 1988
- Staring at the Sun (Neil Zaza album), 2001
- "Staring at the Sun" (Anastacia song), 2014
- "Staring at the Sun" (Rooster song), 2005
- "Staring at the Sun" (TV on the Radio song), 2004
- "Staring at the Sun" (U2 song), 1997
- "Staring at the Sun", a song by Simple Kid
- "Staring at the Sun", a song by James Marriott from Don't Tell the Dog, 2025
- "Staring at the Sun", a song by Mika from No Place in Heaven, 2015
- "Staring at the Sun", a song by The Offspring from Americana, 1998
- "Staring at the Sun", a song by Post Malone from Hollywood's Bleeding, 2019
- "Staring at the Sun", a song by Smile from Maquee, 1994
- "Staring at the Sun", a song by Ultra Vivid Scene from Joy 1967–1990
- "Staring at the Sun", a song by Wendy & Lisa from Eroica, 1990
- "Staring At the Sun", a song by White Lies from As I Try Not to Fall Apart, 2022
- Staring at the Sun, a 2014 album by Anthony Head

== Other media ==
- Staring at the Sun (novel), a 1986 novel by Julian Barnes
- "Staring at the Sun" (Grey's Anatomy), an episode of the TV series Grey's Anatomy
- Staring at the Sun (film), a 2005 film starring Alec Newman
- Staring at the Sun: Overcoming the Terror of Death, a 2008 self-help book by Irvin Yalom
- Staring at the Sun, a film short, 2002
- Staring At The Sun, a radio program featuring experimental music on WVFS-Tallahassee, 89.7FM since 1990

== See also ==
- Staring into the Sun, a 1990 album by The Gufs
- "Staring to the Sun", a 2006 single by Scarling.
- Sungazing
