= Sun Creature (EP) =

EP by Nebula
- Released: March 19, 1999
- Recorded: June – August 1998
- Genre: Stoner rock
- Length: 22:21 (copy with "Fly On"), 13:18 (copies without "Fly On")
- Label: Man's Ruin
- Producer: Nebula; Jack Endino; Joe Hogan

Nebula chronology
Let It Burn (1998)	Sun Creature (1999)	Nebula/Lowrider (1999)

Professional ratings
Review scores
Source	Rating
AllMusic	2.5/5 stars

Sun Creature is the second EP by the American stoner rock band Nebula. The album is compared to Fu Manchu's Eatin' Dust (also released on Man's Ruin) stating that there are many "similarities" in the sound and energy of it. Some CD copies of the EP contain a nine-minute bonus track entitled "Fly On". A shortened "remixed" copy of the song can be heard on Dos EPs compilation. It is out of print.

== Track listing ==
All tracks are written by Eddie Glass and Ruben Romano. All music by Glass

No.	Title	Length
1.	"Rollin' My Way to Freedom"	5:22
2.	"Sun Creature"	3:27
3.	"Smokin' Woman"	5:29
4.	"Fly On"	9:03

Notes

- "Fly On" appears as a bonus track on some releases.

== Personnel ==
- Eddie Glass – guitar, vocals, percussion
- Ruben Romano – drums, vocals
- Mark Abshire – bass
