= Live at Roadburn =

Live at Roadburn may refer to:

- Live at Roadburn (Earthless album), 2008
- Live at Roadburn (Ulver album), 2013
- Live at Roadburn 2003, by Fu Manchu
