= Sun Creature =

Sun Creature may refer to:

- Sun Creature (EP), a 1999 EP by Nebula
- Sun Creature Studio, a Danish animation studio
