= The Action Is Go =

Studio album by Fu Manchu
- Released: October 7, 1997
- Recorded: 1997
- Studios: Grandmaster, Hollywood, California; Sound City, Van Nuys, California
- Genres: Stoner rock; alternative metal
- Length: 55:43
- Label: Mammoth
- Producer: Jay Noel Yuenger

Fu Manchu chronology
| In Search of... (1996) | The Action Is Go (1997) | Godzilla's/Eatin' Dust (1999) |

Professional ratings
Review scores
| Source | Rating |
|---|---|
| AllMusic | 4/5 stars |
| Chronicles of Chaos | 4/10 |
| Collector's Guide to Heavy Metal | 8/10 |
| Entertainment Weekly | A− |
| The Independent | 3/5 stars |
| Kerrang! | 4/5 stars |
| Metal Hammer | 10/10 |
| NME | 8/10 |
| Rock Hard | 7.5/10 |
| Select | 3/5 stars |

The Action Is Go is the fourth studio album by American stoner rock band Fu Manchu. It features new drummer Brant Bjork (Kyuss) and new lead guitarist Bob Balch, replacing Eddie Glass and Ruben Romano who left to form the band Nebula. The album was produced by Jay Noel Yuenger of White Zombie, who contributed some additional instrumentation.

According to AllMusic, the new lineup provided Fu Manchu with "the impetus and inspiration to really start moving forward," and the resulting album demonstrates the band's "punk energy, classic rock drive, psychedelic crunch, and heavy-ass grind all at once." The album sold 25,000 copies in the United States by May 2000.

== Track listing ==
| No. | Title | Length |
|---|---|---|
| 1. | "Evil Eye" | 3:30 |
| 2. | "Urethane" | 3:36 |
| 3. | "The Action Is Go" | 3:06 |
| 4. | "Burning Road" | 5:47 |
| 5. | "Guardrail" | 2:57 |
| 6. | "Anodizer" | 4:26 |
| 7. | "Trackside Hoax" | 4:54 |
| 8. | "Unknown World" | 2:49 |
| 9. | "Laserbl'ast!" | 3:47 |
| 10. | "Hogwash" | 3:41 |
| 11. | "Grendel, Snowman" | 4:09 |
| 12. | "Strolling Astronomer" | 3:43 |
| 13. | "Saturn III" | 7:55 |
| 14. | "Nothing Done" | 1:15 |

European bonus tracks
| No. | Title | Length |
|---|---|---|
| 15. | "Swami's Last Command" | 3:15 |
| 16. | "Module Overload" | 4:19 |

== Personnel ==
- Scott Hill – vocals, guitar
- Brant Bjork – drums
- Bob Balch – guitar
- Brad Davis – bass, theremin
- Jay Noel Yuenger – producer, organ, Minimoog, Electro-Harmonix Space Drum

== Notes ==
- "Module Overload" was first released on the Godzilla EP and was re-recorded with a new vocal line and a different middle part. The original version appears again on Eatin' Dust.
- "Swami's Last Command" was originally a contribution to the soundtrack of the movie Chicago Cab (1998).
- "Evil Eye" was featured on Tony Hawk's Pro Skater 2.
- Tony Alva (of Z-Boys) is on the CD cover skating in the "Dogbowl".
- This albums introduces Brad Davis on the theremin which he used again on Start the Machine.
