= This One (disambiguation) =

"This One" is a single from Paul McCartney's 1989 album Flowers in the Dirt.

This One may also refer to:

- "This One", a song from the 2001 album Charged by Nebula
- "This One", a song from the 2009 album This Is the One by Utada
- This One, a 2012 album by Joe Mafia
- "This One", a song from the 2016 album Good Karma by Roxette
