= Apollo (Nebula album) =

Studio album by Nebula
- Released: February 21, 2006
- Recorded: 2005
- Studio: Hollywood Sound Studios
- Genre: Stoner rock
- Length: 38:05
- Label: Liquor and Poker; Sweet Nothing; Heavy Psych Sounds (2022 reissue)
- Producer: Daniel Rey; Nebula

Nebula chronology
Atomic Ritual (2003)	Apollo (2006)	Heavy Psych (2009)

Professional ratings
Review scores
Source	Rating
AllMusic	4/5 stars
The Aquarian	(positive)
Blabbermouth.net	7/10
Sea of Tranquility	2.5/5 stars

Apollo is the fourth studio album by the American stoner rock band Nebula. It was released on February 21, 2006. The album was reissued in 2022 by the band's current label, Heavy Psych Sounds Records.

Apollo is the band's last album featuring drummer Ruben Romano. Some enhanced copies of the CD include a video of Nebula playing the song "Future Days" live in Japan.

== Track listing ==
All tracks are written by Eddie Glass and Ruben Romano

No.	Title	Length
1.	"Orbit"	0:39
2.	"Loose Cannon"	4:00
3.	"Fever Frey"	2:12
4.	"Lightbringer"	3:13
5.	"Future Days"	4:35
6.	"Ghost Ride"	3:00
7.	"The Alchemist"	2:51
8.	"Trapezium Procession"	1:01
9.	"Controlled"	1:48
10.	"The Eagle Has Landed"	4:20
11.	"Fruit of My Soul"	2:49
12.	"Decadent Garden"	2:50
13.	"Wired"	0:55
14.	"Opiate Float"	3:55

== Personnel ==
- Eddie Glass – guitar, vocals, drums, keyboard
- Ruben Romano – drums, vocals, guitar, keyboard, sitar
- Tom Davies – bass, vocals
