= Gigantoid =

Studio album by Fu Manchu
- Released: April 29, 2014
- Recorded: Simi Valley, California
- Genre: Stoner rock
- Length: 34:44
- Label: At the Dojo Records
- Producers: Fu Manchu & Andrew Giacumakis

Fu Manchu chronology
Signs of Infinite Power (2009)	Gigantoid (2014)	Clone of the Universe (2018)

Professional ratings
Review scores
Source	Rating
The New Zealand Herald	4.5/5 stars
The Sydney Morning Herald	4/5 stars
Salad Days Magazine	7.5/10

Gigantoid is the eleventh studio album by American stoner rock band Fu Manchu. It was released on April 29, 2014, on At the Dojo Records. The album features "a slightly more primitive, raw and ultra fuzzed-out sound" than previous releases.

Initially released as a 2013 split seven-inch single with psych-metal trio Moab, "Robotic Invasion" appears as a bonus track on the digital version of Gigantoid.

== Track listing ==
No.	Title	Length
1.	"Dimension Shifter"	4:32
2.	"Invaders on My Back"	2:26
3.	"Anxiety Reducer"	4:56
4.	"Radio Source Sagittarius"	3:54
5.	"Mutant"	2:18
6.	"No Warning"	1:25
7.	"Evolution Machine"	5:05
8.	"Triplanetary"	2:08
9.	"The Last Question"	7:54
10.	"Robotic Invasion" (digital-only bonus track)	4:17
Total length:		38:55

== Personnel ==
- Scott Hill – vocals, guitar
- Bob Balch – guitar
- Brad Davis – bass
- Scott Reeder – drums

=== Production ===
- Artwork by Kieron Cropper
- Mastered by Gene Grimaldi
- Produced by Andrew Giacumakis and Fu Manchu
- Recorded, engineered, and mixed by Andrew Giacumakis
