= Maquee =

Studio album by Smile
- Released: July 18, 1995
- Genres: Alternative rock, grunge, alternative punk, heavy metal
- Labels: Atlantic, Headhunter

Smile chronology
| Resin (1994) | Maquee (1995) | Girl Crushes Boy (1998) |

Maquee is an album by Smile. It was released by Atlantic on July 18, 1995.

== Background ==
Smile had originally finished recording the album by September 1994, and it was released under the San Diego–based label Headhunter. Their album caught the attention of Atlantic Records, and Smile was soon offered a contract. Upon signing with Atlantic, the trio quit their day jobs and began touring the country. Part of the tour featured the band "Inch", and Smile stayed on the road for nearly a year and a half promoting Maquee. Lyrically, the album plays with themes of fatalism, revenge, and Gothicism. The name of the album came from Reeder's best buddy from Barstow, who had the nickname "Maquee".

Rosas wrote their first single, which was one of the first songs he ever wrote, called "Staring at the Sun" in 1990, stating that he "...wasn't aware enough of what I was doing to be able to make any keen observations on the world of pop culture. It was just looking at my friends and me". It has been described as a "psychedelic plunge into retro rock and modern grunge" by Larry Flick of Billboard Magazine, and it is noted for having a particularly "loud" sound.

== Reception ==
Professional ratings
Review scores
| Source | Rating |
|---|---|
| Allmusic | 2.5/5 stars |
| Los Angeles Times | 3/4 stars |

Maquee fared well with some reviewers, while some felt that it fell short of what they believed the band was capable of making. Ultimately, the album charted on College Music Journal's "Metal" chart in November 1995, but failed to appear afterwards.

The single "Staring at the Sun" received airplay on the radio.

== Charts ==
| Chart (1995) | Peak position |
|---|---|
| CMJ Metal | 23 |

== Track listing ==
| No. | Title | Length |
|---|---|---|
| 1. | "Rock Anthem for the Retarded Teenage Hipster Population" | 3:16 |
| 2. | "Staring at the Sun..." | 3:42 |
| 3. | "Spud Gun" | 2:30 |
| 4. | "Picture Made Past" | 4:54 |
| 5. | "Lemonade" | 3:16 |
| 6. | "Moosh" | 2:42 |
| 7. | "Jack Shrimp" | 2:26 |
| 8. | "Papaya Clearance Sale" | 3:05 |
| 9. | "She" | 5:19 |
| 10. | "Wallflower" | 2:41 |
| 11. | "Until(?)" | 5:52 |

== Personnel ==
- Mike Rosas – guitar, lead vocals, cabasa, rainstick, aspirin bottle, tambourine, cowbell
- Aaron Sonnennberg – bass; backing vocals on "Wallflower"
- Scott Reeder – drums, bongos, cowbell; backing vocals on "Picture Made Past"; lead vocals on "Moosh"

=== Additional personnel ===
- Heather Anderson – backing vocals on "Until(?)"

== Sources ==
- Borzillo, Carrie (15 July 1995). "Popular Uprisings". Billboard Magazine. 107 (28). Nielsen Business Media, Inc: 96. ISSN 0006-2510.
- CMJ New Music Monthly (27). CMJ Network, Inc: 60. November 1995. ISSN 1074-6978.
- Flick, Larry (1 July 1995). "Single Reviews". Billboard Magazine. 107 (26). Nielsen Business Media, Inc: 120. ISSN 0006-2510.
