= Power of Three (Fatso Jetson album) =

Studio album by Fatso Jetson
- Released: 1997
- Recorded: 1996
- Studio: Double Time Studios; Santee, California
- Genre: Stoner rock; desert rock
- Length: 48:41
- Label: SST (341)
- Producer: Fatso Jetson & Jeff Forrest

Fatso Jetson chronology
Stinky Little Gods (1995)	Power of Three (1997)	Flames for All (1999)

Professional ratings
Review scores
Source	Rating
Discogs	4.5/5 stars

Power of Three is the second album released from Fatso Jetson, and the last to appear on SST Records.

== Track listing ==
No.	Title	Length
1.	"Builders and Collectors"	4:26
2.	"Ugly Man, Ugly Name"	4:12
3.	"Mummified"	3:32
4.	"Orgy Porgy"	4:10
5.	"El Taurino"	4:26
6.	"Phil the Hole"	6:11
7.	"Phantom of the Opry"	3:54
8.	"Handgun"	4:35
9.	"Sandy and the Clockfarmer"	3:28
10.	"Bored Stiff"	3:36
11.	"Itchy Brother"	3:58
12.	"Drones Pills"	2:07

== Personnel ==
- Mario Lalli – guitar, vocals
- Larry Lalli – bass
- Tony Tornay – drums
- Vince Meghrouni – harmonica, flute

== Credits ==
Cover Design by Mario Lalli & Mike Maracha

Painting (back cover) by Mario Lalli
