= Livewired in Europe =

Live album by Nebula
- Released: October 27, 2023
- Recorded: 2023
- Venue: Plan B, Malmö, Sweden; Vera, Groningen, Netherlands
- Genre: Stoner rock; heavy psych; space rock; desert rock; psychedelic rock
- Label: Heavy Psych Sounds

Nebula chronology
Transmission from Mothership Earth (2022)	Livewired in Europe (2023)

Livewired in Europe is the third live album by the American stoner rock band Nebula. The album was released on October 27, 2023, by Heavy Psych Sounds Records. It was recorded during the European leg of the band's Transmission from Mothership Earth tour. The band then went on a full-length European tour ahead of Livewired in Europe's release.

== Reception ==
Professional ratings
Review scores
Source	Rating
Distorted Sound	8/10

Tom Fordham of Distorted Sound gave Livewired in Europe an 8 out of 10 rating, stating in his review, "Capturing their iconic sound in a live environment is always going to be a special moment; Nebula once again light up the stage and give you a live experience unlike anything in the stoner scene." Martin Williams of The Sleeping Shaman wrote in the conclusion of his positive review of the album, "Livewired in Europe is a glorious, fuzzy, heavy, sometimes quasi-sloppy, testament to Nebula's skill, power, tenacity, and consistency as a stoner rock band, even under the circumstances of missing a longtime member and having a fill-in bassist."

== Track listing ==
Livewired in Europe track listing
No.	Title	Length
1.	"Man's Best Friend"	4:37
2.	"Down the Highway"	3:24
3.	"Out of Your Head"	4:06
4.	"Highwired"	4:10
5.	"Giant / Clearlight"	6:52
6.	"Full Throttle"	4:30
7.	"Aphrodite"	4:12
8.	"Messiah"	4:44
9.	"Let It Burn"	4:43

CD bonus tracks
No.	Title	Length
10.	"Transmission from Mothership Earth"	3:54
11.	"Let's Get Lost"	4:19
12.	"Warzone Speedwulf"	6:42

== Personnel ==
Credits adapted from the album's liner notes.

- Eddie Glass – guitar, vocals
- Ranch Sironi – bass, backing vocals
- Mike Amster – drums
