= Transmission from Mothership Earth =

Studio album by Nebula
- Released: July 22, 2022
- Studio: Heaven's Gate, Mojave Desert, California
- Genre: Stoner rock; psychedelic rock; space rock
- Length: 38:09
- Label: Heavy Psych Sounds
- Producer: Eddie Glass; Tom Davies

Nebula chronology
Holy Shit (2019)	Transmission from Mothership Earth (2022)	Livewired in Europe (2023)

Singles from Transmission from Mothership Earth
- 1. "Highwired" Released: June 2, 2022; 2. "The Four Horseman" Released: June 28, 2022

Transmission from Mothership Earth is the seventh studio album by the American stoner rock band Nebula. The album was released on July 22, 2022, by Heavy Psych Sounds Records. It is the band's last album featuring late bassist Tom Davies.

== Recording and influences ==
In an interview with Distorted Sound, bassist Tom Davies explained how his shared California residence with guitarist Eddie Glass had an influence on the recording of Transmission from Mothership Earth:

"Since myself and Eddie both live in the Mojave Desert in Joshua Tree, it was perfect. There’s nothing better than recording in surroundings that you’re used to and are relaxed and comfortable in."

He also credited bands including Black Sabbath, Hawkwind, Monster Magnet and The Cosmic Dead as influences on the album. When comparing the release to the band's previous albums, Davies elaborated on how its material is innovative for Nebula:

"It's more just a natural occurrence of the band's sound evolving over time. As any type of artist or creative being, you're always looking to challenge and better yourself within your field. We never say ok now let's write music that’s more spacey or whatever, it's all very natural and organic."

Transmission from Mothership Earth features contributions from former Nebula bassist Mark Abshire along with musician and songwriter Camille Marquez.

== Reception ==
Professional ratings
Review scores
Source	Rating
Distorted Sound	9/10
Ever Metal	9/10
Grizzly Butts	76/100
Metal Digest	70/100
Metal Epidemic	3.5/5 stars
Metal Hammer	5/7
Metal Injection	9/10
Metal Temple	5/10
Reverb Is for Lovers	7.4/10
Spectrum Culture	75/100

Transmission from Mothership Earth received varied reviews from critics, ranging from mixed to very positive. Echoes and Dust gave a favorable review of the album with the concluding statement, "If you like Nebula at their deepest and heaviest trip then Transmission more than ticks that box – it's an essential purchase." Spectrum Culture praised the album to an extent by describing the band's target audience in their review summary, "If you're looking for a soundtrack for riding your motorcycle into outer space to battle intergalactic pharaohs in their cosmic pyramids, though…congratulations, you’ve just found your new favorite record." Metal Epidemic had a mixed response to the release, explaining how the album "doesn't demand repeat listens from the casual Stoner Rock listener", while also calling it "38 minutes of stoner rock heaven."

== Track listing ==
All tracks are written by Eddie Glass, except track 6.

No.	Title	Writer(s)	Length
1.	"Highwired"		4:08
2.	"Transmission from Mothership Earth"		4:08
3.	"Wilted Flowers"		5:19
4.	"Melt Your Head"		3:55
5.	"Warzone Speedwulf"		7:18
6.	"I Got So High"	Tom Davies	4:47
7.	"Existential Blues"		5:21
8.	"The Four Horseman"		3:13
Total length:			38:09

== Personnel ==
Credits adapted from the album's liner notes.

- Eddie Glass – guitar, vocals, keys
- Tom Davies – bass, vocals, ear candy
- Mike Amster – drums

Additional musicians

- Mark Abshire – additional bass on "Melt Your Head"
- Camille Marquez – additional vocals on "The Four Horseman"
