= Clone of the Universe =

2018 album by Fu Manchu

Studio album by Fu Manchu
- Released: February 9, 2018
- Recorded: Simi Valley, California
- Genre: Stoner rock
- Length: 36:48
- Label: At the Dojo
- Producer: Jim Monroe

Fu Manchu chronology
Gigantoid (2014)	Clone of the Universe (2018)	The Return of Tomorrow (2024)

Clone of the Universe is the twelfth studio album by American stoner rock band Fu Manchu, released on February 9, 2018, by At the Dojo Records. The album features a guest appearance by Rush guitarist Alex Lifeson on its closing track, the 18-minute mostly instrumental "Il Mostro Atomico." It was produced by Jim Monroe.

== Reception ==
Professional ratings
Aggregate scores
Source	Rating
Metacritic	78
Review scores
Source	Rating
Blabbermouth.net	8/10
Exclaim!	7/10
Punknews.org	4/5 stars
Sputnikmusic	3.8/5

Exclaim! writer Matthew Ritchie said in his review about the album: "Due to the first half's measly runtime (half of its high octane songs clock in at under three minutes) and heavy as hell ending, listening to Clone of the Universe kind of feels like visiting a tapas bar with a few friends, only to drunkenly venture off at the end of the night to slam down a whole duck, solo (and no, that's not a euphemism): it's a journey most would avoid making, but a compelling one for those willing to roll the dice and ride".

== Track listing ==
No.	Title	Length
1.	"Intelligent Worship"	3:01
2.	"(I've Been) Hexed"	2:48
3.	"Don't Panic"	2:04
4.	"Slower Than Light"	3:26
5.	"Nowhere Left to Hide"	4:19
6.	"Clone of the Universe"	2:57
7.	"Il Mostro Atomico"	18:07
Total length:		36:48

== Personnel ==
- Scott Hill – vocals, guitar
- Bob Balch – guitar
- Brad Davis – bass
- Scott Reeder – drums
- Alex Lifeson – guitar (Track 7)

Additional personnel

- Carl Saff – mastering
