= Fatso Jetson =

American stoner rock band

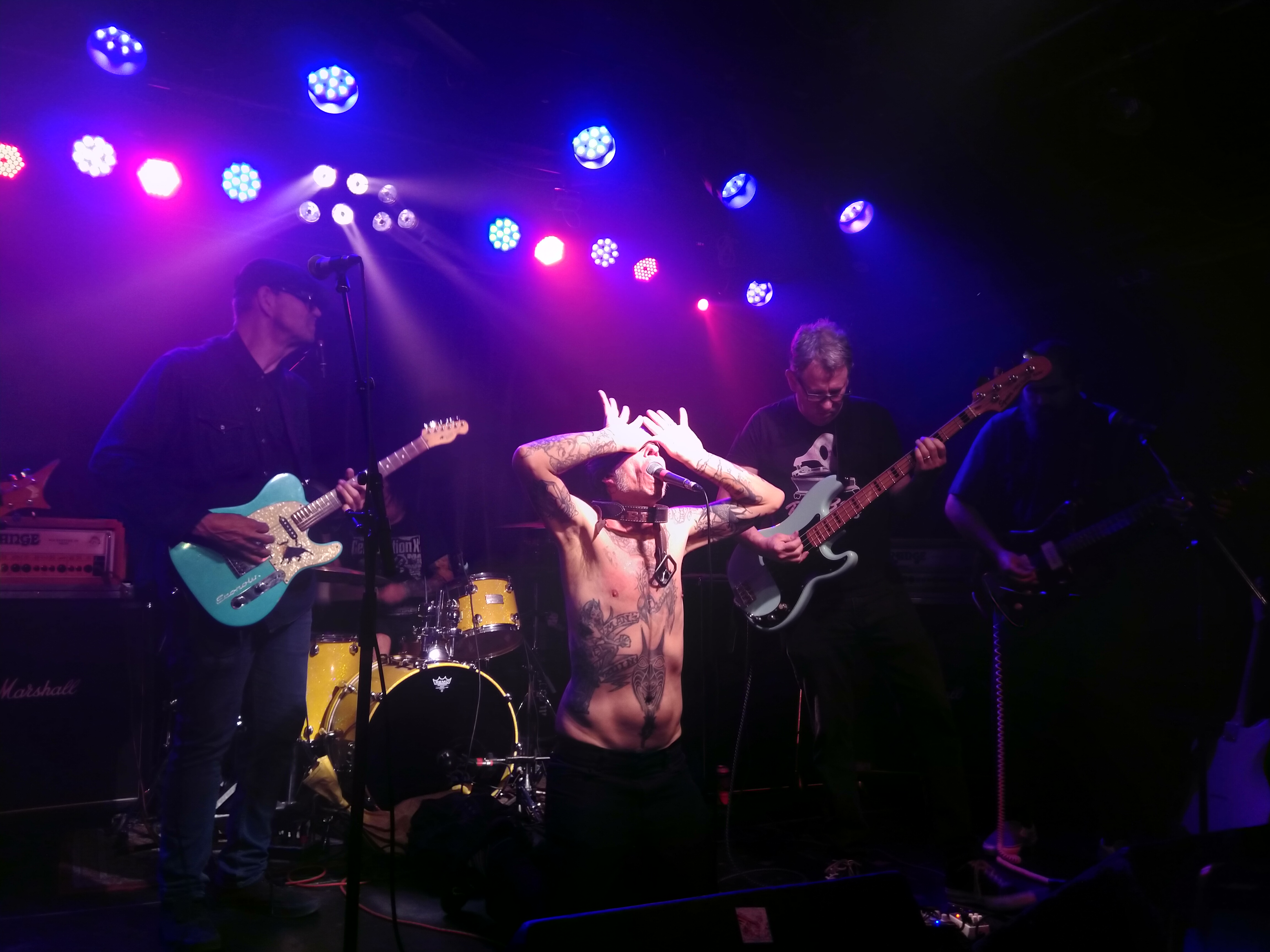
- Fatso Jetson performing with Sean Wheeler in 2023

Background information
- Origin: Palm Desert, California, U.S.
- Genres: Stoner rock; desert rock; psychedelic rock; blues rock
- Years active: 1994–present
- Members: Mario Lalli; Larry Lalli; Tony Tornay; Dino Von Lalli; Herb Lienau
- Past members: Brant Bjork; Gary Arce; Vince Meghrouni
- Website: fatsojetson.net

Fatso Jetson is an American desert rock band from Palm Desert, California, formed in 1994 by Yawning Man members Mario Lalli and Larry Lalli, along with Tony Tornay. They are often credited as the fathers of the desert strain of stoner rock later made most famous by their slightly younger neighbors Kyuss and Queens of the Stone Age. While musically similar to some of their stoner brethren, Fatso Jetson incorporate a broader variety of musical influences that includes punk and surf.

== History ==
Fatso Jetson hail from the Palm Desert area in California. Living in the desert, secluded away from the trendy "scenes" in Los Angeles, Orange County and San Diego, the only places for original music to be played have been pool halls, Mexican restaurants (after hours) and the occasional struggling bar looking to make some fast cash. On many occasions, the only place for a band to play has been in secluded desert canyons powered by a generator. Then in 1994, Mario and Larry Lalli opened the desert's first "rock club". It was at this club that the three decided to form a band.

Fatso Jetson formed after Tony, Mario and Larry spent way too much time together playing pool, drinking beer and watching TV after hours at Mario and Larry's nightclub, "Rhythm & Brews". They decided that since they already played the appropriate instruments, that their time would be better spent playing music.

They played their first show in September 1994, opening for former Black Flag guitarist Greg Ginn. On the basis of this show, Greg decided he wanted to release an album with the band on his record label SST. The band then went on to play as many shows as possible including a small 6 show tour with fellow desert dwellers Kyuss.

Then, in August 1995, Fatso Jetson's first record, "Stinky Little Gods" was released. Just over 2 years later in November 1997, the band released their second full length opus, "Power Of Three", again on SST. It was around this time that the band hooked up with Brant Bjork (ex-Kyuss, ex-Fu Manchu skinsman) who played rhythm guitar. Brant stayed in this capacity until touring with Fu Manchu forced him to leave the band, though he did appear on two 7" releases. One a split with The Bloodshot, and the other a split with Fu Manchu.

In late 1997 Fatso Jetson started to look for another record label and found themselves in the company of Bongload Custom Records. In April 1998, Tony, Mario and Larry entered Monkey Studios in Palm Springs to record their 3rd full length offering for Bongload, "Toasted", produced by Chris Goss (Masters of Reality). Then in August 1998, Gary Arce joined the band as a rhythm guitarist for a tour up the coast with Queens of the Stone Age and continued in this role for a while playing on the 'Flames For All' record and toured with the band for a European tour and an appearance at the Dynamo festival in 1999 until he finally departed in April 2000.

In 2001, Fatso Jetson headed back in the studios to record their fifth album Cruel & Delicious. It was recorded by Schneebie of Earthlings? and released on Josh Homme's record label Rekords Rekords. It features 13 songs including a cover of Devo's "Ton O' Love".

The band continues today as a four piece, adding Vince Meghrouni on the saxophone and harmonica. They still write new material and play as many shows as possible.

In addition to playing shows in and around Los Angeles, Mario and Larry operated a small restaurant and club in Sierra Madre, California called 'Café 322,' which is now closed.

== Band members ==
=== Current members ===
- Mario Lalli – vocals, guitar
- Larry Lalli – bass
- Tony Tornay – drums
- Dino Von Lalli – guitar
- Herb Lienau – bass / guitar

=== Former members ===
- Brant Bjork – guitar (1997–1998) – (Kyuss, Fu Manchu)
- Gary Arce – guitar (1998–2000) – (Yawning Man, Big Scenic Nowhere)
- Vince Meghrouni – harmonica/ sax

== Discography ==
=== Albums ===
- Stinky Little Gods – 1995 – SST Records
- Power of Three – 1997 – SST Records
- Flames for All – 1999 – Man's Ruin Records
- Toasted – 2001 – Bong Load Custom Records
- Cruel & Delicious – 2002 – Rekords Rekords
- Fatso Jetson Live (LP) – 2007 – Cobraside
- Archaic Volumes – 2010 – Cobraside
- Live at Maximum Festival – 2014 – Go Down Records
- Idle Hands – 2016 – Heavy Psych Sounds
- Live from Total Annihilation – 2022 – Ripple Music (split album with All Souls)
- Legends of the Desert: Volume 3 – 2023 – Desert Records (split album with Dali's Llama)

=== Singles and EPs ===
- "Jailbreak" CD/split-7inch w/ Fu Manchu – 1998 – Sessions Records
- Split 7-inch w/ The Bloodshot – 1998 – Miracle Records
- Split 7-inch w/ Fireball Ministry – 1999 – Cattle Prod Records
- Split 7-inch w/ Oak's Mary – 2010 Third Conspiracy
- Split 12-inch w/ Yawning Man – 2013
- 12-inch Tour EP Live at Maximum Festival – 2013
- Earlyshapes split 7-inch w/ Herba Mate – 2014 – Go Down Records
- Split 12-inch w/ Farflung – 2015
- Dreamhomes / Die Cast Split 7-inch w/ del-Toros – 2016 – Shattered Platter

=== Compilations ===
- Welcome to Meteor City – 1998 – Meteor City
- Graven Images – A Tribute to the Misfits – 1999 – Firebird Records
- Stoned Again – 2000 – Bong Load Custom Records
