= Heavy Psych =

Studio album by Nebula
- Released: July 7, 2009
- Studio: The Pass, Los Angeles, California; Mysterious Mammal, Los Angeles California
- Genre: Stoner rock; psychedelic rock; acid rock
- Label: Tee Pee; Heavy Psych Sounds (2022 reissue)
- Producer: Nebula

Nebula chronology
Apollo (2006)	Heavy Psych (2009)	Demos & Outtakes 98–02 (2019)

Heavy Psych is the fifth studio album by the American stoner rock band Nebula. It was released on July 7, 2009, by Tee Pee Records. The album was reissued in 2022 by the band's current label Heavy Psych Sounds Records.

Originally self released by the band as an EP in 2008, the album version is remastered and features three additional tracks.

== Reception ==
Professional ratings
Review scores
Source	Rating
AllMusic	3.5/5 stars
PopMatters	6/10
The Quietus	6/10
The Skinny	3/5 stars

PopMatters wrote that "Heavy Psych feels both weighted by history and infinitely lighter and spryer than the turgid slop that all too often passes for hard rock these days." The Village Voice called it "basically their familiar, green-fingered grooves filtered through a little Hawkwind cosmic glop." The Chicago Reader wrote: "The inspiration they obviously don't care to waste on their album titles gets channeled instead into period-perfect early-70s lazy-pothead comfy-chair boogie and ecstatic explosions of flanged-out guitar designed to turn your skull inside out through your headphones."

== Track listing ==
All tracks are written by Eddie Glass, except where noted

No.	Title	Lyrics	Music	Length
1.	"Pulse"			3:55
2.	"The Dagger"	Glass, Tom Davies	Glass, Davies	3:37
3.	"Aphrodite"			4:09
4.	"Dream Submarine"	(instrumental)	Davies	2:21
5.	"In the Depth's"			3:52
6.	"The Other Side"			5:33
7.	"Crown of Thorns"			3:00
8.	"Lead Sky"			3:01
9.	"Little Yellow Pill"			3:49
10.	"The Perfect Rapture"			3:15
11.	"Running of the Bulls"	Rob Oswald	Oswald	1:54

== Personnel ==
Credits adapted from the album's liner notes.

- Eddie Glass – guitar, vocals, keys
- Tom Davies – bass, vocals
- Rob Oswald – drums, percussion
