= Lutefisk (band) =

American alternative rock band

- Album cover for Lutefisk's unreleased third album, recorded for A&M Records

Background information
- Origin: Los Angeles, California
- Genres: Alternative rock
- Years active: 1990s
- Labels: Bong Load Custom Records
- Past members: Don Burnet (aka Dallas Don), Beale Dabbs (aka Frosting), Brandon Jay (aka Quasar), Jeff Watson, Greg Mora, Natalie Woodlawn, Brian McSherry

Lutefisk was an American alternative rock band based in Los Angeles. It was active in the 1990s as part of LA's Silver Lake alternative music scene. During this time, it released two studio albums on Bong Load Records and recorded a third unreleased record for A&M Records.

== History ==
Lutefisk's frontman, Don Burnet, was formerly the frontman of the band Plain Wrap during the 1980s, and led the band 3D Picnic from 1986 to 1992. Burnet had also played drums for Beck before becoming Lutefisk's guitarist. The founding of the band was related to the curing of a "premature midlife artistic crisis", faced by Burnet the age of 30. The name of the band refers to lutefisk, a dried fish dish of Scandinavian origin, prepared with lye. Its "window of success" as a recipe is rather small, according to Garrison Keillor's 2007 book Pontoon. According to Burnet, the band's name is about playing pop songs that are "hard to stomach".

Lutefisk released its first album, Deliver from Porcelain: Theme and Variations, in 1995 on Bong Load Custom Records. It was named the 10th best local album of the year by Mike Boehm in the Los Angeles Times. In 1996, Lutefisk performed at Lollapalooza on the indie stage.

They released their second and final album, Burn in Hell Fuckers, on the same label in 1997. Its name derives from a phrase the band's frontman wrote on the wall of their recording studio after it was robbed, in hopes it might scare away the burglars if they returned. Lutefisk recorded Burn in Hell Fuckers on a four-track, which they wore out during the album's production. It received mixed reviews from critics, particularly pertaining to the band's cover of Wild Cherry's "Play That Funky Music". Critics who wrote favorably of the cover included Steven Mirkin, who praised the cover as "near perfect", and Curtis Bonney, who wrote that it "plunges into the radioactive whirlpool and comes out mangled, nearly (and hilariously) unidentifiable." Conversely, Randy Roberts said the band's decision to cover it "makes one question the band's musical judgment from the first note to the last." The album was awarded a three-star rating by Jeff Salamon, who described the album's sound as "a cross between the Grifters and Frank Zappa".

The August 2009 issue of SPIN included Lutefisk in their article "SPIN's 100 Greatest Bands You've Probably Never Heard Of".

== Discography ==
- Deliver from Porcelain: Theme and Variations (Bong Load Custom, 1995)
- Burn in Hell Fuckers (Bong Load Custom, 1997)
- This Is Where The Stars Are (A&M Records, 1997, unreleased)
