= In Search of... (Fu Manchu album) =

Studio album by Fu Manchu
- Released: February 27, 1996
- Recorded: September 1995
- Studios: Grandmaster, Hollywood, California
- Genre: Stoner rock
- Length: 40:18
- Label: Mammoth
- Producers: Fu Manchu, Brian Jenkins

Fu Manchu chronology
Daredevil (1995)	In Search of... (1996)	The Action Is Go (1997)

Singles from In Search of...
- 1. "Asphalt Risin'" Released: 1996; 2. "Missing Link" Released: 1996

In Search of... is the third studio album by Fu Manchu, a stoner rock band from Southern California. It was released on February 27, 1996, by Mammoth Records.

This was the last album to feature Ruben Romano and Eddie Glass. Shortly after its release, the pair left and formed the band Nebula.

== Reception ==
Professional ratings
Review scores
Source	Rating
AllMusic	3.5/5 stars
Collector's Guide to Heavy Metal	8/10
Kerrang!	4/5 stars

CMJ New Music Monthly referred to In Search of...'s "down-tuned, fuzzed-out riffage" as an of extension of the previous "wonders" of "low-brow sonic crunch" including Entombed's Wolverine Blues and heavy metal pioneers Blue Cheer. Classic Rock magazine stated that the band "conquered a predilection for over-indulgence" which led to their inclusion on the list of 10 stoner rock albums you should definitely own.

In the book The Encyclopedia of Heavy Metal by Daniel Bukszpan it was brought out that "they are also notable for their influence on stoner rock's visual aesthetic, as the band's album artwork was among the first to feature the themes of muscle car's, gaseous astronomical entries, and that goofy Battlestar Galactica typeface." Speaking of the sonic influence of the album the book Come My Fanatics: A Journey Into the World of Electric Wizard by Dan Franklin stated, "Jus admits today that the album's gnarly guitar tone, generated in large part by a Crown model fuzzbox, blew him away and partially influenced what he wanted to achieve on Come My Fanatics...."

The band played the album live to commemorate its 15th anniversary. Lead vocalist and guitarist Scott Hill announced the tour explaining, "We are stoked to be playing these tunes for the fans and will be doing a few of them for the first time ever and maybe the last." Accurately recreating the instrumentation of the album Hill later related in an interview with The Aquarian Weekly that leading up to the tour, "we just pulled out all the old gear, the old guitars." In a post tour interview with Premier Guitar he went into the technical aspects of how they recreated the album live, "We tune to D all the way down D–G–C–F–A–D" and "I've pretty much had the same guitar tone since '93 or '94. I use a Univox Super-Fuzz and Crown W-Fuzz pedals, and those are basically the same tone."

== Track listing ==
No.	Title	Length
1.	"Regal Begal"	2:25
2.	"Missing Link"	3:21
3.	"Asphalt Risin'"	3:11
4.	"Neptune's Convoy"	5:06
5.	"Redline"	2:14
6.	"Cyclone Launch"	3:25
7.	"Strato-Streak"	4:02
8.	"Solid Hex"	2:37
9.	"The Falcon Has Landed"	4:21
10.	"Seahag"	3:13
11.	"The Bargain"	2:36
12.	"Supershooter"	3:41

Japanese edition bonus track
No.	Title	Length
13.	"Chevy Van" (Sammy Johns cover)	3:22

== Personnel ==
- Scott Hill – vocals, guitar, producer
- Ruben Romano – drums, producer
- Eddie Glass – guitar, producer
- Brad Davis – bass, producer

Production

- Recorded, mixed and produced by Brian Jenkins
- Assistant engineer: Josh Turner
- Mastered by Eddy Schreyer at Future Disc Systems, N. Hollywood, CA
- Cover and back photos by Alex Obleas
- Fu Manchu photographed by Lisa Johnson
