= Idle Hands (Fatso Jetson album) =

Studio album by Fatso Jetson
- Released: October 7, 2016
- Studio: Rancho De La Luna; Joshua Tree, California
- Genre: Stoner rock; desert rock
- Length: 56:22
- Label: Heavy Psych Sounds
- Producer: Mathias Schneeberger & Mario Lalli

Fatso Jetson chronology
Archaic Volumes (2010)	Idle Hands (2016)	Live from Total Annihilation (2022)

Idle Hands is the eighth album by American desert rock band Fatso Jetson, released in 2016 by Heavy Psych Sounds.

== Track listing ==
No.	Title	Length
1.	"Wires Wheels and Robots"	5:54
2.	"Portuguese Dream"	2:41
3.	"Royal Family"	4:52
4.	"Nervous Eater"	4:16
5.	"Seroquel"	6:33
6.	"Idle Hands"	5:44
7.	"Last of the Good Times"	5:23
8.	"Then and Now"	5:27
9.	"The Vincent Letter"	6:56
10.	"48 Hours"	4:26
11.	"Dream Homes"	4:05
Total length:		56:22

== Personnel ==
- Guitars, vocals – Mario Lalli
- Guitars, vocals – Dino von Lalli
- Bass – Lawrence Lalli
- Drums, percussion – Tony Tornay III
- Keyboard, guitars, bass, vox – Mathias Schneeberger
- Vocals, Spiritual Guido – Sean Wheeler
- Vocals – Olive Zoe Lalli
- Music by – Fatso Jetson, Dino Lalli, Mario Lalli, Lawrence Lalli, Tony Tornay, Mathias Schneeberger
- Lyrics on track 2 and 9 by Sean Wheeler, all other lyrics by Mario Lalli

Production

- Recorded June 2016 at Rancho de la Luna, Joshua Tree, California; Electric Lalliland, San Pedro, California
- Mixed by Mathias Schneeberger, Donner & Blitzen Studio, Los Angeles, California
- Produced by Mathias Schneeberger & Mario Lalli
