= Go for It... Live! =

Live album by Fu Manchu
- Released: July 22, 2003
- Recorded: January 2002–October 2002
- Genre: Stoner rock
- Length: 96:57
- Label: Steamhammer Records
- Producer: Fu Manchu

Fu Manchu chronology
California Crossing (2001)	Go for It... Live! (2003)	Start the Machine (2004)

Professional ratings
Review scores
Source	Rating
AllMusic	4/5 stars

Go for It... Live! is a live album by California stoner rock band Fu Manchu. It was recorded during the California Crossing World Tour of 2002. It is the first album to feature Scott Reeder on drums.

== Track listing ==
Disc One
No.	Title	Length
1.	"Hell on Wheels"	4:47
2.	"Laserbl'ast!"	3:28
3.	"Asphalt Risin'"	3:23
4.	"Mongoose"	3:53
5.	"Downtown in Dogtown"	3:56
6.	"Boogie Van"	4:31
7.	"Tilt"	2:55
8.	"Ojo Rojo"	3:52
9.	"Strato-Streak"	4:01
10.	"King of the Road"	4:42
11.	"Anodizer"	7:30

Disc Two
No.	Title	Length
1.	"Evil Eye"	4:45
2.	"Hang On"	3:37
3.	"Wurkin'"	3:48
4.	"California Crossing"	3:33
5.	"Over the Edge"	5:32
6.	"Regal Begal"	2:49
7.	"Godzilla"	5:37
8.	"Superbird"	4:15
9.	"Weird Beard"	4:36
10.	"Squash That Fly"	3:03
11.	"Saturn III"	8:29

== Personnel ==
- Scott Hill – vocals, guitar
- Bob Balch – guitar
- Brad Davis – bass
- Scott Reeder – drums
