= Cruel & Delicious =

Studio album by Fatso Jetson
- Released: November 30, 2002
- Studio: Donner and Blitzen; Silverlake, California
- Genre: Stoner rock; desert rock
- Length: 42:43
- Label: Rekords Rekords
- Producer: Mathias Schneeberger & Fatso Jetson

Fatso Jetson chronology
Toasted (2001)	Cruel & Delicious (2002)	Fatso Jetson Live (LP) (2007)

Professional ratings
Review scores
Source	Rating
AllMusic	3/5 stars

Cruel & Delicious is an album from Fatso Jetson. It was released on November 30, 2002, by Rekords Rekords.

== Track listing ==
No.	Title	Length
1.	"Pleasure Bent"	3:52
2.	"Drinkin' Mode"	1:31
3.	"Light Yourself on Fire"	4:59
4.	"Died in California"	3:03
5.	"Heavenly Hearse"	4:20
6.	"Ton o' Luv"	2:27
7.	"Pig Hat Smoking"	1:49
8.	"Superfrown"	4:25
9.	"Iron Chef"	4:07
10.	"Sunshine Enema"	2:24
11.	"Party Pig"	2:43
12.	"Stranger's Blues"	3:21
13.	"Mountains of Debt"	3:35

== Personnel ==
- Mario Lalli – guitar, vocals
- Tony Tornay – drums
- Larry Lalli – bass

Additional musicians

- Jesse Hughes – guitar, vocals
- Schneebie – organ, electric piano, vocals
- Vince Meghrouni – harmonica, tenor, alto sax

== Credits ==
Recorded & Mixed at Donner & Blitzen, Silver Lake, California

Produced by Mathias Schneeberger & Fatso Jetson

"Ton O Love" words and music by G. V. Casale/Devo

Cover Photography by Tony Tornay

Inside Booklet Photography by Patrick Krausgrill
