= No One Rides for Free =

No One Rides For Free

Studio album by Fu Manchu
- Released: 1994
- Genre: Stoner rock
- Length: 27:07
- Label: Bong Load
- Producer: Brant Bjork, Fu Manchu

Fu Manchu chronology
No One Rides For Free (1994)	Daredevil (1995)

No One Rides for Free is the debut album by the stoner rock band Fu Manchu. The album was produced by former Kyuss member Brant Bjork, who would eventually become Fu Manchu's drummer for a short tenure. It was the band's only album to feature bassist Mark Abshire. A twenty-year anniversary edition was released in 2014.

== Reception ==
Professional ratings
Review scores
Source	Rating
AllMusic	4/5 stars
Los Angeles Times	2.5/4 stars

The Los Angeles Times noted that "a band can go far these days by recycling sounds from the biggest, dumbest mastodons of '70s arena rock."

Drowned in Sound reckoned it inferior to Daredevil, but still authentic stoner rock. The Rough Guide to Rock called it a "classic".

== Track listing ==
No.	Title	Length
1.	"Time to Fly"	3:05
2.	"Ojo Rojo"	3:49
3.	"Show and Shine"	2:54
4.	"Mega-Bumpers"	3:51
5.	"Free and Easy (Summer Girls)"	2:03
6.	"Superbird"	4:05
7.	"Shine It On"	2:30
8.	"Snakebellies"	4:48

== Personnel ==
- Scott Hill – guitar, vocals, producer
- Ruben Romano – drums, producer
- Mark Abshire – bass, producer
- Eddie Glass – guitar, producer
- Brant Bjork – producer

== Credits ==
Recorded and mixed at Sandbox Studio
Engineered and mixed by Geoff Siegel
Mastered by Stephan Marcussen
All songs by Fu Manchu
Published by Van-O-Rama Music/ASCAP 1993
Cover photo: Von Lidd
Live photos: Alex Obleas
