= To the Center =

Studio album by Nebula
- Released: August 24, 1999
- Recorded: April 1999
- Studios: Hanszek, Seattle, Washington
- Genres: Stoner rock; desert rock
- Length: 47:51
- Labels: Sub Pop; Heavy Psych Sounds (2018 reissue)
- Producers: Jack Endino; Nebula

Nebula chronology
| Nebula/Lowrider (1999) | To the Center (1999) | Charged (2001) |

To the Center is the debut studio album by the American stoner rock band Nebula. It was released on August 24, 1999, on Sub Pop. The album was later reissued in 2018 by the band's current label, Heavy Psych Sounds Records.

== Production ==
Recorded in Seattle, the album was produced with Jack Endino. Guitarist Eddie Glass played a Gibson SG.

Mark Arm sang on the band's cover of the Stooges' "I Need Somebody".

== Critical reception ==
Professional ratings
Review scores
| Source | Rating |
|---|---|
| AllMusic | 4/5 stars |
| Antichrist Magazine | 78/100 |
| Chicago Sun-Times | 4/4 stars |
| Classic Rock | 8/10 |
| New Noise Magazine | 4.5/5 stars |

Exclaim! wrote that Glass "transformed himself into a veritable guitar god almost overnight in an era wherein the slightest six-string noodling is waved off the road, considered indulgent." The Chicago Tribune thought that "acoustic guitars, sitar, [and] synthesizer give this Hendrix-like trio added texture." OC Weekly decided that "the band also gets a little groovy, pulling out the aural incense to jam on the Fugazi-like 'Freedom' and synthesizer-laced, Jefferson Airplane-ish 'Synthetic Dream'."

The Province determined that "this power trio seems to have blotted up its churn and burn from ancient Frisco acid rock band, Blue Cheer." Tucson Weekly deemed To the Center "an album which undeniably pushes the band to the forefront of its genre, whether or not you've got a bong in front of you."

Houston Press wrote: "On a song such as 'Come Down', Nebula actually does what few '90s bands have ever done, chemically enhanced or not: It achieves true heaviness. After the song's simple three-note syncopated intro doubles back on itself, Glass scratches his guitar pick down his strings before singing the hurried lyrics. And it's during those one and a half seconds, the time it takes for Glass's pick to travel a few inches, that Nebula is the heaviest band on earth. Not since Ritchie Blackmore's days with Deep Purple has the simple gesture of pick scratching been used so perfectly."

AllMusic called the album a "retro-psychedelic heavy rock platter, long on stripped-down riff muscle and surprisingly technically adept guitar jams."

== Track listing ==
All tracks are written by Eddie Glass and Ruben Romano, except where noted. All music by Glass.

Standard release
| No. | Title | Lyrics | Length |
|---|---|---|---|
| 1. | "To the Center" | | 6:31 |
| 2. | "Come Down" | | 2:01 |
| 3. | "Whatcha Lookin' For" | | 2:37 |
| 4. | "Clearlight" | | 4:29 |
| 5. | "Freedom" | | 7:14 |
| 6. | "Antigone" | | 2:30 |
| 7. | "I Need Somebody" | Iggy Pop, James Williamson | 4:18 |
| 8. | "So Low" | | 3:45 |
| 9. | "Synthetic Dream" | | 4:28 |
| 10. | "Fields of Psilocybin" | | 2:15 |
| 11. | "Between Time" | Randy Holden | 3:22 |
| 12. | "You Mean Nothing" | | 4:21 |
| Total length: | | | 47:51 |

== Personnel ==
- Eddie Glass – guitar, vocals, percussion, Fender Rhodes, bolbatar, drums
- Ruben Romano – drums, vocals, percussion, sitar
- Mark Abshire – bass, vocals, audio generator

Additional personnel

- Mark Arm – vocals on "I Need Somebody"
- Jon Wright – Fender Rhodes on "To the Center" and "So Low"
