= California Crossing =

Studio album by Fu Manchu
- Released: October 23, 2001; January 17, 2002 (Japan)
- Studios: Sound City, Van Nuys, California
- Genre: Stoner rock
- Length: 39:27
- Label: Mammoth
- Producer: Matt Hyde

Fu Manchu chronology
King of the Road (2000)	California Crossing (2001)	Go for It... Live! (2003)

California Crossing is the seventh studio album by the American stoner rock band Fu Manchu It was released on October 23, 2001, by Mammoth Records.

== Production ==
The album was produced by Matt Hyde, who encouraged Fu Manchu to spend more time on preproduction and song arrangements. The band pushed the vocals higher in the mix for the album, worked on backing vocals, and tried to keep most of the tracks around three minutes. Circle Jerks singer Keith Morris provides vocals on "Bultaco".

Drummer Brant Bjork departed the band after the recording of the album.

== Critical reception ==
Professional ratings
Review scores
Source	Rating
AllMusic	4/5 stars
Calgary Herald	2.5/4 stars
The Encyclopedia of Popular Music	3/5 stars
Entertainment Weekly	C
NME	4/5 stars
Rolling Stone	3/5 stars
St. Petersburg Times	A
USA Today	2.5/4 stars

The Guardian deemed the album "a strangely nihilistic celebration of all things Cali." NME wrote that Fu Manchu "are the stoned Ramones, a matey Motorhead: a band who can rewrite that album into the infinite future and rule perpetually." The Washington Post thought that "more than anything else, it's the band's cartoonish perspective that keeps Crossing from flagging." USA Today called the songs "rooted in mad propulsion, clean sonics and Scott Hill's atonal holler."

== Track listing ==
No.	Title	Length
1.	"Separate Kingdom"	3:41
2.	"Hang On"	3:39
3.	"Mongoose"	4:10
4.	"Thinkin' Out Loud"	3:27
5.	"California Crossing"	3:36
6.	"Wiz Kid"	3:51
7.	"Squash That Fly"	2:56
8.	"Ampn'"	3:35
9.	"Bultaco"	3:11
10.	"Downtown in Dogtown"	3:18
11.	"The Wasteoid" (instrumental)	3:52

Japanese edition bonus track
No.	Title	Length
12.	"Planet of the Ape Hangers"	3:50

== Personnel ==
- Scott Hill – vocals, guitar
- Brant Bjork – drums
- Bob Balch – guitar
- Brad Davis – bass
- Matt Hyde – mixer, producer

Production

- Vocals on "Bultaco" by Keith Morris
- Backing vocals by Fu Manchu
- Engineered by Nick Raskulinecz
- Recorded at Sound City, Van Nuys, CA
- Vocals recorded at Aftermath, Laguna, CA
- Mixed at Henson Studios, Los Angeles, CA
- Mastered by Dave Collins at Steve Marcussen Mastering, Hollywood, CA
- Enhanced CD footage filmed by Ken Pucci
- All songs written by Fu Manchu, except "California Crossing", lyrics by Rodney Skelton.

== Charts ==
Chart (2001)	Peak position
Australian Albums (ARIA Charts)	98
