= Holy Shit (Nebula album) =

Studio album by Nebula
- Released: June 7, 2019
- Studios: Mysterious Mammal Studios, Los Angeles, California; All Welcome Records, Los Angeles, California; Heaven's Gate, Los Angeles, California
- Genres: Stoner rock; psychedelic rock; desert rock
- Length: 43:04
- Label: Heavy Psych Sounds
- Producers: Nebula; Matt Lynch

Nebula chronology
Demos & Outtakes 98–02 (2019)	Holy Shit (2019)	Transmission from Mothership Earth (2022)

Singles from Holy Shit
- 1. "Witching Hour" Released: April 4, 2019; 2. "Man's Best Friend" Released: May 16, 2019

Holy Shit is the sixth studio album by the American stoner rock band Nebula. It was the band's first studio album released after their seven-year hiatus that lasted from 2010–2017. The album was released on June 7, 2019, by Heavy Psych Sounds Records.

== Background and recording ==
In an interview with Heavy Music HQ, bassist Tom Davies explained how the band's reformation stemmed from jam sessions with guitarist Eddie Glass and the frontman of Sasquatch, Keith Gibbs. Gibbs was highly in favor of Nebula's reunion and was persistent on the idea of the band getting back together. Davies credited Glass on coming up with the album's title. He also revealed how the creative/recording process for Holy Shit contained both similarities and new aspects compared to the previous albums he's been a part of:

"We kinda used to just bring finished or part song ideas/demos to rehearsals and we’d all give them a listen, learn them and make any adjustments if needed and some of the songs were also written that way too this time around. We jammed a lot over the last couple of years and that’s how most of the songs for Holy Shit came together. One of us would have a riff and we’d start jamming it and go from there and eventually down the line at some point end up with a song."

Holy Shit introduced drummer Michael Amster of Blaak Heat to the band's lineup. It also features contributions from the band's touring bassist Ranch Sironi. Ahead of the release of the album, Davies summarized its sound to Kerrang! with the following statement:

"Our new album Holy Shit is the fuzzy, drugged up result of our time away in the deepest, darkest recesses of the wilderness in the space time continuum."

== Reception ==
Professional ratings
Review scores
Source	Rating
Ave Noctum	8.5/10
Ghost Cult	7/10
Hellbound.ca	6/10
Kerrang!	(favorable)
Metal Temple	8/10
Reverb Is for Lovers	5.2/10
Rock Hard	6/10
Science of Noise	7/10
Visions	7/12

Holy Shit garnered mixed to positive reviews from critics. Blabbermouth.net regarded the different direction the band took in its sound with Holy Shit, stating, "Nebula has always been just a little more dangerous. Just a little more unhinged. Holy Shit shows this front to back for the essential part of their character it is, and yet it's not trying to be anything they've done before." Kerrang! favored the album and called it "everything a good desert rock album should be." Echoes and Dust noted how the "album does drag in parts" yet "the good dramatically outweighs the bad" and ultimately does not tarnish the band's legacy.

== Track listing ==
All tracks are written by Nebula.

No.	Title	Length
1.	"Man's Best Friend"	4:56
2.	"Messiah"	4:28
3.	"It's All Over"	4:58
4.	"Witching Hour"	4:12
5.	"Fistful of Pills"	1:48
6.	"Tomorrow Never Comes"	7:11
7.	"Gates of Eden"	3:39
8.	"Let's Get Lost"	4:40
9.	"The Cry of a Tortured World"	7:12
Total length:		43:04

== Personnel ==
Credits adapted from the album's liner notes.

- Eddie Glass — guitar, vocals, percussion
- Tom Davies — bass, vocals
- Mike Amster — drums, percussion

Additional musicians

- Ranch Sironi – snores, guitar on "Gates of Eden"
