= Smile (American band) =

- Origin: Orange County, California, United States
- Genres: Post-punk, grunge, psychedelic rock, emo-core
- Years active: 1992–2003, 2013-2014
- Labels: Atlantic, Headhunter

Smile was an American rock band.

== 20 Year Reunion Shows ==
In February 2013, Scott Reeder, Michael Rosas, Aaron Sonnenberg, and Matt Fletcher reunited to play 3 shows in Southern California

- The Casbah - San Diego, CA
- Port Of Sound Record Shoppe - Costa Mesa, CA
- The Troubadour - West Hollywood, CA

In January 2014, Scott Reeder, Michael Rosas, and Aaron Sonnenberg reunited once more to play The Casbah 25th Anniversary.

== Background ==
Rosas and Sonnenberg, who were both attending Woodbridge High School, formed Smile in 1992. After placing an advertisement in The Recycler for a drummer, they found Reeder, which completed the band's lineup for the next seven years as a trio. Encompassing genres of both grunge and psychedelic rock, they released their second record, called Resin. Smile did not emerge from Orange County until 1995, from the success of their album Maquee.

The style of music of Smile has been described as "rage-filled rock" with "scraping guitars and screaming vocals". Some of their influences include The Kinks, The Melvins, early Pink Floyd, and The Seeds. They signed under Headhunter, a San Diego-based label, and Atlantic in 1994, but left Atlantic during the recording sessions of their second album, due to a growing resistance the band felt towards the label. They remained under Headhunter. In 1998, original band member, Aaron Sonnenberg left and was replaced by Bob Thomson on bass. In 1999, the band added keyboardist Matt Fletcher. In 2001, Scott Reeder left the band to join Fu Manchu and was replaced by Matt's brother, James Fletcher on drums. In 2003, Michael Rosas broke up the band.

=== Maquee ===
On July 18, 1995 Atlantic reissued the album Maquee, which had originally been released by Headhunter the previous year, September 1994. The first single from their album was "Staring at the Sun", which received airplay on the radio, and charted on College Music Journal's Metal chart in November 1995. Following the release of the album, Smile toured with the band Inch.

=== Girl Crushes Boy ===
Their follow-up album Girl Crushes Boy was released November 24, 1998, under Cargo and Headhunter.

== Members ==
- Michael Rosas – lead vocals, guitars, percussion, keyboards (1992-2003)
- Scott Reeder – drums, backing vocals, percussion, occasional lead vocals (1992–1999)
- Aaron Sonnenberg – bass, backing vocals (1992–1998)
- James Fletcher – drums (2001–2003)
- Matt Fletcher – keyboards, backing vocals (1999–2003)
- Bob Thomson – bass (1998–2003)

- Information on band members.

== Discography ==
- 1993 DEMOS EP • 2018
- 5 Song Demo EP • 2001
- Girl Crushes Boy • 1998
- Masterlocks + 3 EP • 1996
- Sleepover EP • 1996
- Maquee • 1995
- Resin EP • 1993
- Bus Vol. 1 EP • 1992

== Sources ==
- Borzillo, Carrie (July 15, 1995). "Popular Uprisings". Billboard Magazine. 107 (28). Nielsen Business Media, Inc: 96. ISSN 0006-2510.
- Clover, Joshua (February 1999). "The Shredder". Spin Magazine. 15 (2). Spin Media LLC: 134. ISSN 0886-3032.
- CMJ New Music Monthly (27). CMJ Network, Inc: 60. November 1995. ISSN 1074-6978.
- "New Releases". CMJ New Music Report. 56 (594). CMJ Network, Inc: 104. November 2, 1998. ISSN 0890-0795.
- Flick, Larry (July 1, 1995). "Single Reviews". Billboard Magazine. 107 (26). Nielsen Business Media, Inc: 120. ISSN 0006-2510.
- Gulla, Bob; Vlad (August 1995). "Reviews; Metal". CMJ New Music Monthly (24). CMJ Network, Inc: 60. ISSN 1074-6978.
- Reed, Lou (2000). Schwann Spectrum. Schwann Group, 2000. ISBN 1-57598-078-9.
- Robbins, Ira A. (1997). The Trouser Press guide to '90s rock. Simon & Schuster. p. 846. ISBN 0-684-81437-4.
