= King of the Road (album) =

Studio album by Fu Manchu
- Released: February 15, 2000; January 26, 2000 (Japan)
- Recorded: 1999
- Studios: Monkey, Palm Desert, California
- Genre: Stoner rock
- Length: 46:20
- Label: Mammoth
- Producer: Joe Barresi

Fu Manchu chronology
Godzilla's/Eatin' Dust (1999)	King of the Road (2000)	California Crossing (2001)

King of the Road is the sixth studio album by the California stoner rock band Fu Manchu. It was released on February 15, 2000, by Mammoth Records. Many of the songs are about cars and car culture.

The Japanese and European releases contain the track "Breathing Fire" in place of "Drive". "Breathing Fire" was on the demo version of the record that was sent to radio stations, clubs, and fans.

== Production ==
The album was produced by Joe Barresi at Monkey Studios. It was recorded live in the studio, where the band experimented with fuzz pedal tones. King of the Road contains a cover of Devo's "Freedom of Choice", which was praised by Mark Mothersbaugh.

== Critical reception ==
Professional ratings
Review scores
Source	Rating
AllMusic	4/5 stars
Collector's Guide to Heavy Metal	9/10
Courier News	3/4 stars
Des Moines Register	4/5 stars
Edmonton Journal	4/5 stars
The Encyclopedia of Popular Music	3/5 stars
Pittsburgh Post-Gazette	3.5/4 stars
Rock Hard	8/10
Rolling Stone	3/5 stars
Spin	7/10

The Austin Chronicle wrote: "King of the Road is another rock & roll road trip back to the early days of the Carter administration, sounding like an album that could have been made in 1977 ... It's full of obscenely fat guitar licks à la Frehley, Blackmore, Iommi (and the most perfect AC/DC break you've ever heard in the middle of 'Over the Edge'); treble-free tones; and more songs about driving and vans. It'd be stupid if it weren't so thoroughly convincing and didn't rock so unrelentingly." The Morning Call wrote that "like the Ramones (and most great rock 'n' roll in general), the [monolithic] concept is based on visceral rather than cerebral response." The Riverfront Times deemed the album "a happy hunting ground of beefy, bong-rattling RAWK AND ROLLLLL." The Chicago Tribune called it "one bad, bone-jarring tour of the Great Riff Valley in all its arid, inhospitable majesty." The Windsor Star noted that "Fu Manchu even flesh the primeval metal groove out of a new wave tune, Devo's 'Freedom of Choice', giving the song a beefy bottom end."

The Washington Post opined that "true believers might call Fu Manchu's approach to headbanging odes of the road conceptually pure; skeptics could deem it moronic." The Boston Globe thought that "guitarists [Scott] Hill and Bob Balch's aptitude for the big guitar sound popularized by Kiss and AC/DC locks into a monster rhythm section, ensuring that listeners are laughing with Fu Manchu, never at them." In a review of Fu Manchu's next album, California Crossing, USA Today deemed King of the Road a "creative peak" and "a stoner milestone of turbo-revved guitars and West Coast slackerdom." The New York Times advised: "Think Tommy Lee riffing with Jerry Garcia."

== Track listing ==
No.	Title	Length
1.	"Hell on Wheels"	4:48
2.	"Over the Edge"	5:01
3.	"Boogie Van"	4:17
4.	"King of the Road"	4:03
5.	"No Dice"	3:09
6.	"Blue Tile Fever"	5:30
7.	"Grasschopper"	3:51
8.	"Weird Beard"	3:32
9.	"Breathing Fire"	3:46
10.	"Hotdoggin'"	4:52
11.	"Freedom of Choice" (Devo cover)	3:27

== Personnel ==
- Scott Hill – vocals, guitar
- Brant Bjork – drums
- Bob Balch – guitar
- Brad Davis – bass

Production

- Joe Barresi – producer

Credits

- All songs written by Bob Balch, Brant Bjork, Brad Davis and Scott Hill, except "Freedom of Choice": written by Mark Mothersbaugh and Gerald Casale
- All tracks recorded, mixed and engineered at Monkey Studios, Palm Desert, CA, except "Hell on Wheels" mixed at Sound City Studios, Van Nuys, CA
- Assistant engineer: Steve Feldman
- Mastered by Dave Collins A&M Studios, Los Angeles, CA
- Live photo: C. Taylor Crothers
- Band photo: Alex Obleas
- Art direction: Lane Wurster
- Graphic design: Christopher Eselgroth
