= Stinky Little Gods =

Studio album by Fatso Jetson
- Released: August 22, 1995
- Studio: Rhythm & Brews; Indio, California
- Genre: Stoner rock; desert rock; surf rock
- Length: 39:42
- Label: SST (321)

Fatso Jetson chronology
| Stinky Little Gods (1995) | Power of Three (1997) |

Professional ratings
Review scores
| Source | Rating |
|---|---|
| AllMusic | 4/5 stars |

Stinky Little Gods is the debut album from desert rock band Fatso Jetson.

== Track listing ==
| No. | Title | Length |
|---|---|---|
| 1. | "Kettles of Doom" | 4:28 |
| 2. | "Joke Shop" | 2:27 |
| 3. | "Von Deuce" | 2:34 |
| 4. | "Captain Evil" | 1:34 |
| 5. | "Pressure for Posture" | 4:21 |
| 6. | "Nightmares Are Essential" | 2:23 |
| 7. | "Gargle" | 3:45 |
| 8. | "Salt Chunk Mary's" | 3:08 |
| 9. | "Highway 86" | 4:22 |
| 10. | "Corn on the Macabre" | 10:11 |

== Personnel ==
- Mario Lalli – guitar, vocals, lap steel guitar
- Tony Tornay – drums
- Larry Lalli – bass

== Credits ==
Recorded and Mixed by Mike Thuney and Fatso Jetson at Rhythm & Brews, Indio, Calif.

Cover Art by Fernando Munoz (Viva La Poachers!)

Band Photo by Stacey Grouix
