= Flames for All =

Studio album by Fatso Jetson
- Released: January 8, 1999
- Studio: Monkey Studios; Palm Springs, California
- Genre: Stoner rock; desert rock
- Length: 31:41
- Label: Man's Ruin

Fatso Jetson chronology
Power of Three (1997)	Flames for All (1999)	Toasted (2001)

Professional ratings
Review scores
Source	Rating
AllMusic	4/5 stars

Flames for All is the third album from Fatso Jetson, released on the legendary Man's Ruin Records. This is the only album to feature their short lived four-piece lineup featuring Gary Arce of Yawning Man.

== Track listing ==
No.	Title	Length
1.	"The Untimely Death of the Keyboard Player"	3:04
2.	"Vatos of the Astral Plane"	3:51
3.	"Fucked Up and Famous"	4:11
4.	"Flames for All"	3:53
5.	"Icon to Excon"	1:32
6.	"Let's Clone"	2:52
7.	"August in Lawndale"	2:28
8.	"Graffiti in Space"	4:09
9.	"Deaf Conductor"	5:38

== Personnel ==
- Mario Lalli – guitar, vocals
- Larry Lalli – bass
- Gary Arce – guitar
- Tony Tornay – drums
- Steve Feldman – drums (Track 7)

== Credits ==
Recorded and Mixed by Steve Feldman at Monkey Studios, Palm Springs, California

Mastered at Future Disc, Hollywood, California
