= Eddie Glass =

American musician

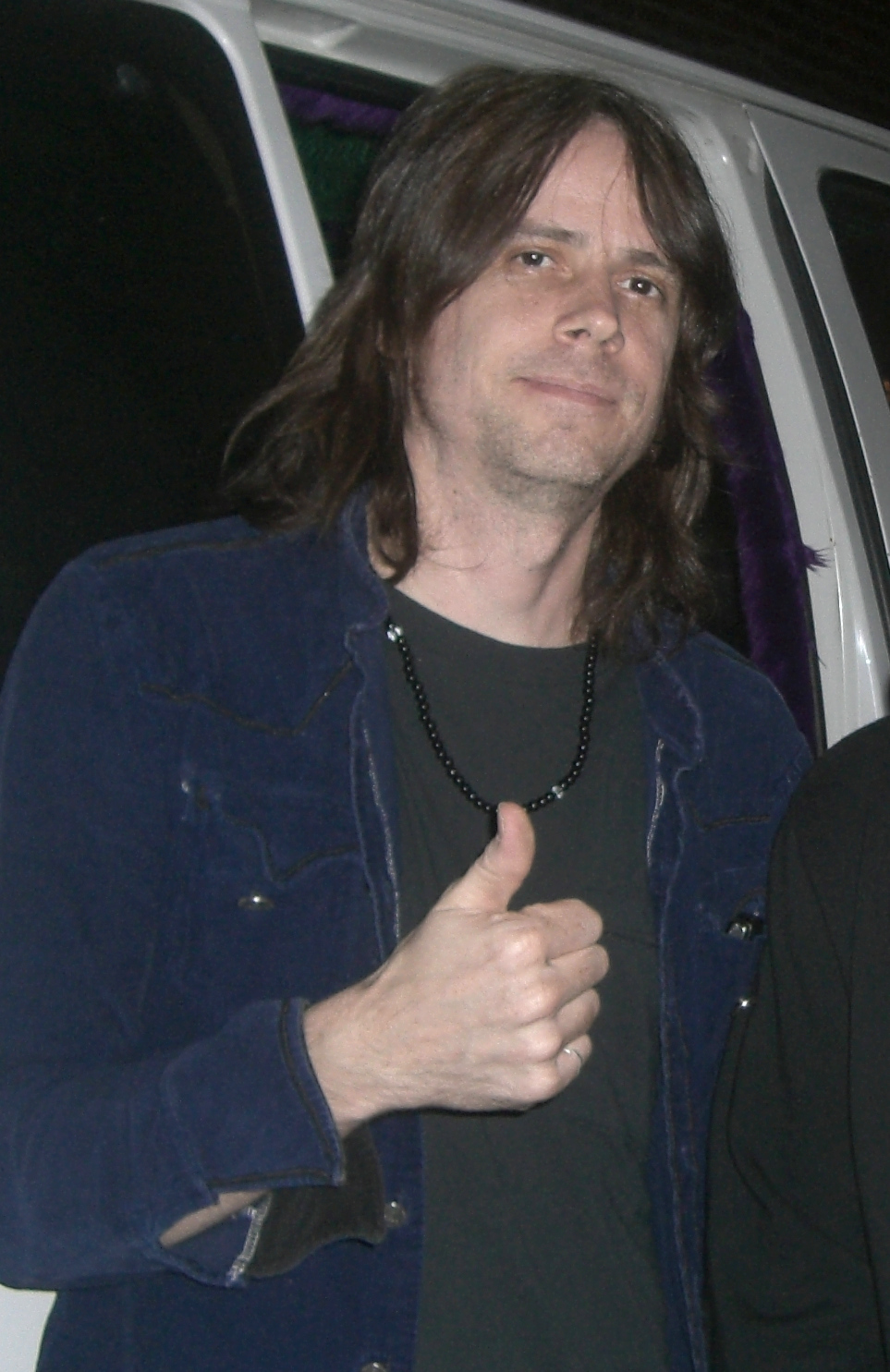
- Glass in 2007

Background information
- Born: December 19, 1970 (age 55); Oakland, California, U.S.
- Genres: Stoner rock
- Occupations: Musician; record producer
- Instruments: Guitar; vocals; drums; bass
- Years active: 1987–present
- Labels: Liquor and Poker; Sub Pop; Tee Pee; Sweet Nothing; Heavy Psych Sounds
- Member of: Nebula
- Formerly of: Olivelawn; Fu Manchu

Edward Glass (born December 19, 1970) is an American rock musician best known as the frontman of the stoner rock band Nebula. Glass was formerly the drummer for the punk rock band Olivelawn, as well as a guitarist of Fu Manchu. Nebula has been Glass' primary musical group since 1997, when he and drummer Ruben Romano left Fu Manchu.

== Biography ==
Though currently known as a guitarist, Glass first gained recognition as the drummer in California punk band Olivelawn. Glass is the founder, lead guitarist, vocalist, and primary songwriter for Nebula, and previously acted in a similar capacity (minus the vocal duties) in Fu Manchu. Some of his songs have been featured in films, skateboard videos, and video games such as Tony Hawk's Pro Skater 4 and Tony Hawk's Underground 2.

Glass started playing with Hagop Najarian and Neil Blender in the mid 1980s as teenagers in southern California, and the trio formed Worked World. Worked World self-released one 7-inch EP. Some of these songs were featured in early skateboarding videos.

== Discography ==
=== Olivelawn ===
- 1991 – Sap – (Nemesis)
- 1992 – Sopho-More Jinx! – (Headhunter)

=== Fu Manchu ===
- 1994 – No One Rides for Free – (Bong Load)
- 1995 – Daredevil – (Bong Load)
- 1996 – In Search of... – (Mammoth)

=== Nebula ===
- 1998 – Let It Burn – (Tee Pee, Relapse)
- 1999 – Sun Creature – (Man's Ruin)
- 1999 – Nebula/Lowrider – (MeteorCity)
- 1999 – To the Center – (Sub Pop)
- 2001 – Charged – (Sub Pop)
- 2002 – Dos EPs – (MeteorCity)
- 2003 – Atomic Ritual – (Liquor and Poker)
- 2006 – Apollo – (Liquor and Poker)
- 2008 – Peel Sessions – (Sweet Nothing)
- 2009 – Heavy Psych – (Tee Pee)
- 2019 – Demos & Outtakes 98–02 – (Heavy Psych Sounds)
- 2019 – Holy Shit – (Heavy Psych Sounds)
- 2021 – Live in the Mojave Desert: Volume 2 – (Giant Rock, Heavy Psych Sounds)
- 2022 – Transmission from Mothership Earth – (Heavy Psych Sounds)
- 2023 – Livewired in Europe – (Heavy Psych Sounds)
