= Godzilla's/Eatin' Dust =

- At the Dojo version

Studio album by Fu Manchu
- Released: February 19, 1999; November 30, 2004 (Elastic) December 7, 2010 (At the Dojo)
- Recorded: November 22, 1998
- Studios: Monkey, Palm Desert, California
- Genre: Stoner rock
- Length: 34:38
- Labels: Man's Ruin, Elastic, At the Dojo
- Producer: Fu Manchu

Fu Manchu chronology
The Action Is Go (1997)	Godzilla's/Eatin' Dust (1999)	King of the Road (2000)

Alternative cover
- 1999 Man's Ruin version

Reissue cover
- 2019 re-release, Godzilla's/Eatin' Dust +4

Professional ratings
Review scores
Source	Rating
AllMusic	3.5/5 stars
Collector's Guide to Heavy Metal	6/10

Godzilla's/Eatin' Dust (alternatively titled (Godzilla's) Eatin' Dust or simply Eatin' Dust) is the fifth studio album by American stoner rock band Fu Manchu, released on February 19, 1999, on the now defunct Man's Ruin label. The album combines what were originally two limited 10" releases: "Godzilla" (1997) and "Eatin' Dust" (1999).

Godzilla's/Eatin' Dust was the second album for new members Brant Bjork and Bob Balch, who replaced Ruben Romano and Eddie Glass in 1997. Josh Homme of Kyuss and Queens of the Stone Age played lead guitar under the alias of Mike Coopersmith, as Balch had yet to join the band. Homme also played percussion and produced the three-track 1996 "Godzilla" session.

Several versions of the album have been released in various formats. It was reissued on Elastic Records in 2004 with different track order and artwork. In 2010, the band's own label At The Dojo Records reissued the album again, with the same track order and slightly different artwork.

In 2019, the album was re-released with four previously unreleased tracks and was titled Godzilla's/Eatin' Dust +4. The added tracks, also from the original "Godzilla" sessions, are early versions of three songs that later appeared on 1997's The Action Is Go, and a cover of Thin Lizzy's "Jailbreak" (a different version than that released on the 1998 "Jailbreak" 7").

"Godzilla" is a Blue Öyster Cult cover.

== Track listing ==
All tracks by Fu Manchu except where noted.

10" vinyl 1997 (MR-048) titled "Godzilla":

1. "Godzilla" – 4:31 (Donald "Buck Dharma" Roeser)
2. "Module Overload" – 4:16
3. "Living Legend" – 5:08

10" vinyl 1999 (MR-157) titled "Eatin' Dust":

1. "Eatin' Dust" – 3:08
2. "Shift Kicker" – 3:00
3. "Orbiter" – 3:13
4. "Mongoose" – 6:12

CD 1999 (MR-157 cd) titled as Eatin' Dust; LP 1999 (MR-163) titled as (Godzilla's) Eatin' Dust:

1. "Godzilla" – 4:31
2. "Module Overload" – 4:16
3. "Living Legend" – 5:08
4. "Eatin' Dust" – 3:08
5. "Shift Kicker" – 3:00
6. "Orbiter" – 3:13
7. "Mongoose" – 6:12
8. "Pigeon Toe" – 4:45

CD 2004 (ELS-023) titled as (Godzilla's) Eatin' Dust; CD/LP 2010 (ATD004-2) titled as Godzilla's/Eatin' Dust:

1. "Eatin' Dust" – 3:08
2. "Shift Kicker" – 3:00
3. "Orbiter" – 3:13
4. "Mongoose" – 6:12
5. "Pigeon Toe" – 4:45
6. "Module Overload" – 4:16
7. "Living Legend" – 5:08
8. "Godzilla" – 4:31

All Formats 2019 (MR-175) titled as Godzilla's/Eatin' Dust +4 (ATDO16)

1. "Eatin' Dust" – 3:08
2. "Shift Kicker" – 3:00
3. "Orbiter" – 3:13
4. "Mongoose" – 6:12
5. "Pigeon Toe" – 4:45
6. "Module Overload" – 4:16
7. "Living Legend" – 5:08
8. "Godzilla" – 4:31
9. "Grendel, Snowman" – 3:36
10. "Strolling Astronomer" – 4:07
11. "Urethane" – 4:30
12. "Jailbreak" – 3:58 (Phil Lynott)

== Personnel ==
- Scott Hill – vocals, guitar
- Josh Homme – lead guitar on track 1, percussion on tracks 1 to 3
- Brant Bjork – drums
- Bob Balch – lead guitar
- Brad Davis – bass guitar
- Produced by Fu Manchu

Production

- Engineered and Mixed by Steve Feldman
- Assistant Engineer: Frank Hanyak
- "Godzilla" session tracks recorded at Rancho De La Luna, Joshua Tree, CA on October 19, 1996
- "Eatin' Dust" session tracks recorded at Monkey Studios, Palm Springs, CA on November 22, 1998
- Mastered by Future Disc
- Management: Catherine Enny/Guerrilla MGMT Collective
