= Michael Rosas =

American singer-songwriter

- Also known as: Mike Rosas
- Origin: Orange County, California
- Genres: Alternative rock, Indie rock, Rock music, Hardcore punk, Punk rock, Folk music
- Years active: 1987–present

Michael Rosas is an American singer, songwriter and guitarist, best known for his involvement in the band Smile (1992–2003) and as a solo artist, performing and releasing music under his own name.
