= Archaic Volumes =

Studio album by Fatso Jetson
- Released: April 3, 2010
- Studio: Donner and Blitzen Silverlake, California; Total Annihilation Silverlake, California
- Genre: Stoner rock; desert rock
- Length: 43:13
- Label: Cobraside
- Producer: Mathias Schneeberger & Fatso Jetson

Fatso Jetson chronology
Fatso Jetson Live (LP) (2007)	Archaic Volumes (2010)	Yawning Man & Fatso Jetson Split (2013)

Professional ratings
Review scores
Source	Rating
Sputnikmusic	4.5/5 stars

Archaic Volumes is the seventh album from Fatso Jetson, released on April 3, 2010, by Cobraside.

== Track listing ==
No.	Title	Length
1.	"Jet Black Boogie"	4:12
2.	"Play Dead"	4:48
3.	"Jolting Tales of Tension"	3:17
4.	"Archaic Volumes"	4:39
5.	"Golden Age of Cell Block Slang"	4:10
6.	"Here Lies Boomer's Panic"	4:52
7.	"Let Go"	3:51
8.	"Back Road Tar"	6:20
9.	"Garbage Man"	3:28
10.	"Monoxide Dreams"	3:37

== Personnel ==
- Mario Lalli – guitar, vocals
- Tony Tornay – drums
- Larry Lalli – bass

Additional musicians

- Vince Meghrouni – harmonica, saxophone, vocals
- Mathias Schneeburger – organ, piano
- Gene Trautmann – drums (Track 10)
- Dino von Lalli – guitar (Track 9)

== Credits ==
Music By, Words By – Fatso Jetson (tracks: 1 to 8, 10), Mario Lalli (tracks: 1 to 8, 10)

Recorded & Mixed at Donner & Blitzen, Silver Lake, California

Produced by Mathias Schneeberger & Fatso Jetson
