= Charged (Nebula album) =

Studio album by Nebula
- Released: April 10, 2001, September 12, 2001 (Japan)
- Recorded: October 2000
- Studio: Water Music, Hoboken, New Jersey
- Genre: Stoner rock; psychedelic rock
- Length: 46:44
- Label: Sub Pop; Sweet Nothing; Heavy Psych Sounds (2019 reissue)
- Producer: Nebula; John Agnello

Nebula chronology
To the Center (1999)	Charged (2001)	Dos EPs (2002)

Charged is the second studio album by the American stoner rock band Nebula. It was released on April 10, 2001, and was the band's last album released on Sub Pop. The album was remastered and reissued in 2019 by the band's current label, Heavy Psych Sounds Records.

== Critical reception ==
Professional ratings
Review scores
Source	Rating
AllMusic	4/5 stars
NME	4/5 stars

Reception for the album was positive. However, the positive reviews were granted for contradictory changes in genre/style. AllMusic complimented their increased acoustic complexity, alongside improved "trippy background effects". NME congratulated their increase in raw power and a summary of "an album that takes the glib stoner rock soundbite and forces strong acid on its tongue". Conversely, Exclaim! felt the band were "putting their more unhinged and progressive leanings to the side," and opted for a more cohesive set of stoner groove and rock.

== Track listing ==
All tracks are written by Nebula. All music by Eddie Glass.

Standard release
No.	Title	Length
1.	"Do It Now"	4:03
2.	"Beyond"	3:38
3.	"Giant"	3:55
4.	"Travelin' Man's Blues"	5:41
5.	"Instant Gravitation"	3:37
6.	"This One"	3:42
7.	"Ignition"	4:34
8.	"Shaker"	3:27
9.	"Goodbye Yesterday"	4:38
10.	"All the Way"	9:25
Total length:		46:44

== Personnel ==
- Eddie Glass – guitar, vocals, keyboards
- Ruben Romano – drums, vocals, keyboards
- Mark Abshire – bass, vocals

Produced by Nebula and John Agnello

Credits

- Recorded October 2000 at Water Music, Hoboken, New Jersey
- Engineered by John Agnello
- Assistant engineering by Rudyard Lee Cullers
- Assistant engineering by Charles Martinez
- Additional recording by Geoff Sanoff
- Mixed by John Agnello & Nebula November 2000 at Dangerous Music, New York City
  - "All the Way" was mixed at Water Music
- Mastered by John Golden
- Editing by J. J. Golden
- Band photos by Jenny Mcgee
- Cover photo by Ruben Romano, graficized by Mark Abshire
- Cover concept: Nebula, assembly by Mark Abshire

== Notes ==
- Charged is the band's last studio release featuring Mark Abshire on bass.
- The third track "Giant" was featured in the skateboarding video game Tony Hawk's Pro Skater 4.
- The Japanese release on Sweet Nothing Records contains the bonus tracks "Humbucker" (from the "Clearlight" single) and "Cosmic Egg" (from the "Do It Now" single).
- The 2019 Heavy Psych Sounds reissue features the bonus tracks "Cosmic Egg" and a demo version of "Giant".
