= Start the Machine (album) =

Studio album by Fu Manchu
- Released: September 14, 2004
- Genre: Stoner rock
- Length: 35:28
- Label: DRT Entertainment
- Producer: Brian Joseph Dobbs

Fu Manchu chronology
Go for It... Live! (2003)	Start the Machine (2004)	We Must Obey (2007)

Professional ratings
Review scores
Source	Rating
AllMusic	4/5 stars
Classic Rock	3/5 stars

Start the Machine is the eighth album by California stoner rock band Fu Manchu. This is the first studio album featuring new drummer Scott Reeder.

== Track listing ==
No.	Title	Length
1.	"Written in Stone"	3:21
2.	"I Can't Hear You"	1:27
3.	"Understand"	3:16
4.	"Make Them Believe"	3:46
5.	"Hey"	2:28
6.	"I'm Gettin' Away"	2:33
7.	"Out to Sea"	3:34
8.	"Open Your Eyes"	2:32
9.	"Today's Too Soon"	3:29
10.	"It's All the Same"	3:30
11.	"Tunnel Vision"	2:05
12.	"I Wanna Be"	3:27

== Personnel ==
- Scott Hill – lead vocals, guitar
- Bob Balch – guitar, backing vocals
- Brad Davis – bass, theremin, backing vocals
- Scott Reeder – drums, backing vocals

=== Production ===
- Brian Joseph Dobbs – producer, engineer, mixing
- Danielle Burns – digital editing
- David Paul Jr. Collins – mastering
- Carl Saff – remastering
