= Fu Manchu (band) =

American stoner rock band

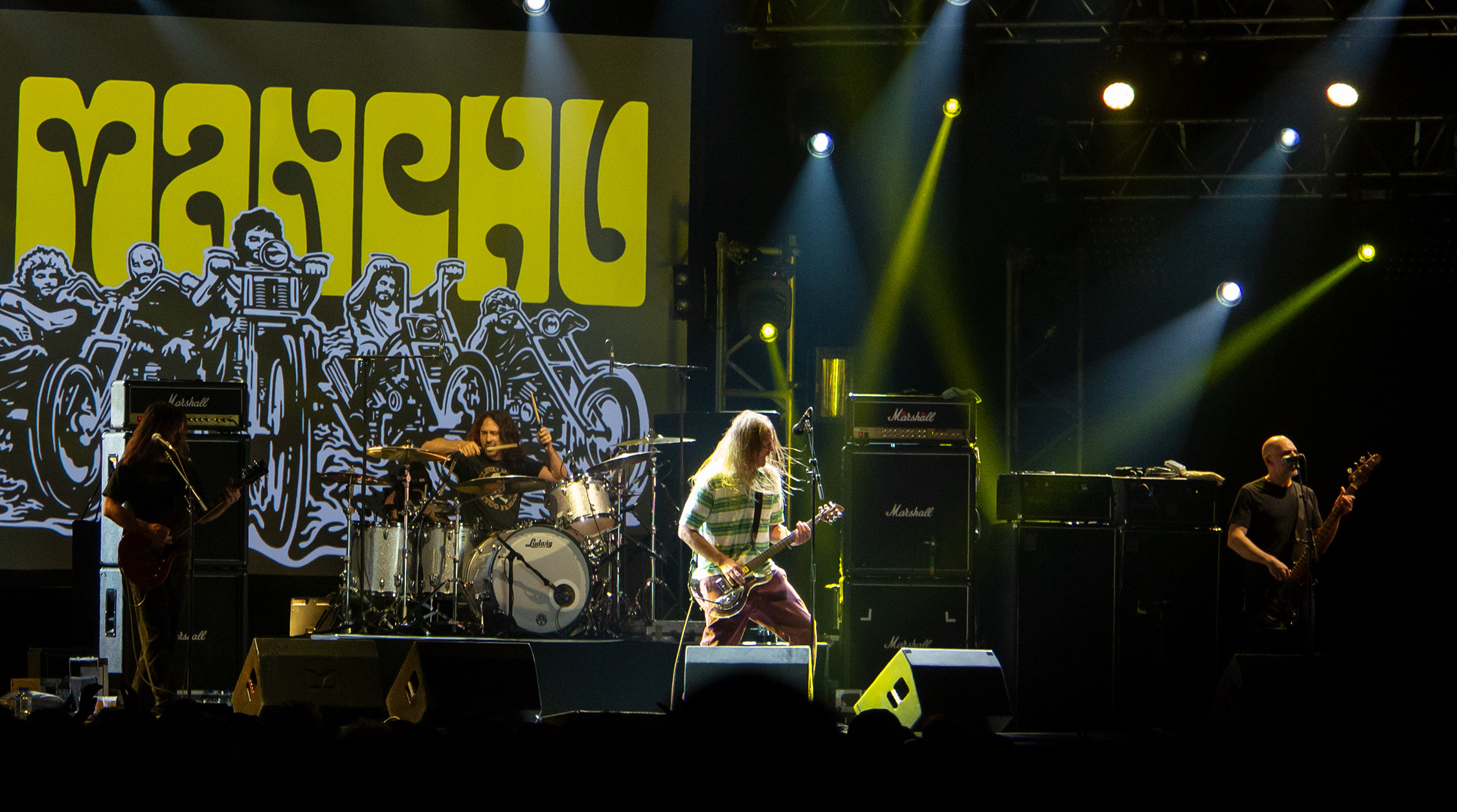
- Fu Manchu at Hellfest 2019

Background information
- Also known as: Virulence (1985–1990)
- Origin: Orange County, California, U.S.
- Genres: Stoner rock; desert rock
- Years active: 1985–present
- Labels: DRT; Liquor and Poker; Mammoth; Bong Load; Man's Ruin; Slap-a-Ham
- Spinoffs: Nebula; Sun and Sail Club; Big Scenic Nowhere
- Members: Scott Hill; Brad Davis; Bob Balch; Scott Reeder
- Past members: Ruben Romano; Ken Pucci; Mark Abshire; Greg McCaughey; Glenn Chivens; Scott Votaw; Eddie Glass; Brant Bjork
- Website: fu-manchu.com

Fu Manchu is an American stoner rock band from Orange County, California. The band grew out of the hardcore punk band Virulence, which was founded in 1985, and adopted the name Fu Manchu in 1990. The band underwent multiple lineup changes throughout the 80s and 90s, but has remained consistent since 2001. The band currently consists of founding-guitarist-turned-lead-vocalist Scott Hill, bassist Brad Davis, lead guitarist Bob Balch and drummer Scott Reeder.

Fu Manchu has long been associated with the Palm Desert Scene, alongside bands such as Queens of the Stone Age, Kyuss and Mondo Generator. Monster Riff has described the band as "one of the most loved and revered... bands in the stoner rock world."

== History ==
Fu Manchu originally formed in 1985 as a hardcore punk band called Virulence. The lineup was vocalist Ken Pucci, guitarist Scott Hill, bassist Mark Abshire, and drummer Ruben Romano. In 1987, Abshire left the band and was replaced by Greg McCaughey. They recorded their debut LP If This Isn't a Dream... in 1988, which was released on Alchemy Records (1989). In 1990, Pucci left the band and was replaced by vocalist Glenn Chivens, and they changed their name to Fu Manchu. Soon after, they released the "Kept Between Trees" 7 inch single on Slap-a-Ham Records. McCaughey was replaced by Mark Abshire. Chivens also left the band around this time for unknown reasons. Rather than search for a new vocalist, Scott Hill became lead singer, and Scott Votaw was recruited as lead guitarist. In 1992, Fu Manchu released three 7 inch singles: "Senioritis", "Pick Up Summer", and "Don't Bother Knockin' (If This Vans Rockin')". In 1993, Votaw left the band and was replaced by lead guitarist Eddie Glass, who had previously played drums in the band Olivelawn.

Fu Manchu's first album, No One Rides for Free (1994), was released by Bong Load Custom Records, an independent label. No One Rides for Free marked the beginning of the band's heavy focus on muscle cars and drag racing, common themes in the stoner rock genre.

Abshire left Fu Manchu before they recorded their second album, Daredevil, in 1995. He was replaced by Brad Davis. The band promoted Daredevil with extensive touring throughout the US and Canada, and reached a wider audience thanks to an opening slot with Monster Magnet, who at the time were the commercial darlings of the stoner rock genre.

Romano and Glass left shortly after the release of Fu Manchu's third album, In Search of... (1996), citing personal and musical differences with Hill. They were replaced by Brant Bjork and Bob Balch, respectively. Glass, Romano and Abshire soon regrouped to form Nebula, a power trio that took the jam-influenced side of Fu Manchu and expanded on it. Members of Nebula have commented that "we're all family" to fans wearing Fu Manchu shirts at their concerts.

Fu Manchu went on to release several successful albums, including The Action Is Go (1997), Godzilla's/Eatin' Dust (1999), and King of the Road (2000), all while continuing to reinforce their reputation as a powerful live act. The band had gained this reputation over the years due to their performance when touring with notable bands such as Kyuss, Monster Magnet, Marilyn Manson, Clutch, Corrosion of Conformity, White Zombie, Sevendust, and P.O.D., among others.

In 2001, the band released their seventh album, California Crossing. Brant Bjork left the band soon after to pursue a solo career and was replaced by former Sunshine and Smile drummer Scott Reeder (often confused with bassist Scott Reeder, of Kyuss, Unida, and Goatsnake fame). In 2004, Fu Manchu released their eighth album, Start the Machine.

Fu Manchu's ninth album We Must Obey was released on February 19, 2007. The band spent most of 2007 and 2008 on tour, playing several shows in North America and Europe.

In February 2008, the track "Mongoose" (from the California Crossing album) was featured in a Super Bowl ad for the Toyota Sequoia.

Their tenth album Signs of Infinite Power was released on October 19, 2009 in Europe and on October 20 in North America.

On March 10, 2010, it was announced that Scott Reeder would play drums for Social Distortion for the South American tour dates in April. In June 2012, the band stated they had begun writing for a new record. In 2014, the band released its eleventh album, Gigantoid.

In December 2017, they announced their twelfth album, Clone of the Universe, which was released on February 9, 2018.

In March 2024, Fu Manchu announced their thirteenth studio album, The Return of Tomorrow, a double album which was released on June 14. The single "Hands of the Zodiac" was released the same day. Hill commented on the band's choice to record a double album, saying "we should do a double record with 7 heavy fuzzy songs on one record and the other record 6 mellow(er) songs..."

== Influences ==
Fu Manchu cited influences including the Melvins, Black Sabbath, Black Flag, Laughing Hyenas, White Zombie, Tad, Dinosaur Jr., Soundgarden, Mudhoney, and Alice in Chains.

== Members ==
=== Current members ===
- Scott Hill – guitar (1985–present), lead vocals (1990–present), backing vocals (1985–1990)
- Brad Davis – bass, backing vocals (1994–present)
- Bob Balch – lead guitar (1996 – present)
- Scott Reeder – drums, backing vocals (2001–present)

=== Former members ===
- Ruben Romano – drums, backing vocals (1985–1996)
- Ken Pucci – lead vocals (1985–1990)
- Mark Abshire – bass, backing vocals (1985–1987, 1990–1994)
- Greg McCaughey – bass (1987–1990)
- Glenn Chivens – lead vocals (1990)
- Scott Votaw – guitar (1990–1993)
- Eddie Glass – guitar (1993–1996)
- Brant Bjork – drums (1996–2001)

== Discography ==
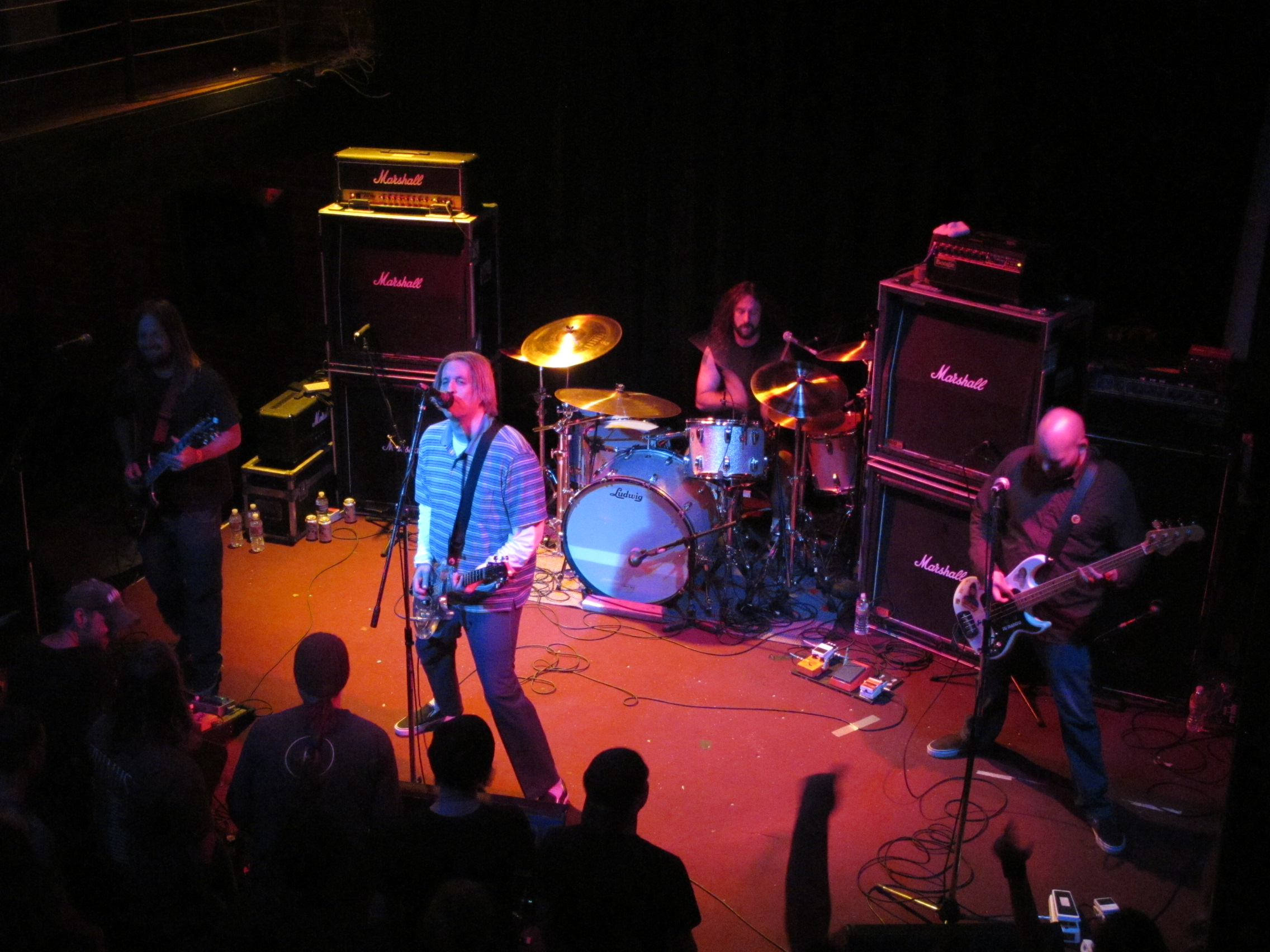
Fu Manchu performing in 2011

=== Albums ===
- No One Rides for Free LP/CD (1994 Bong Load)
- Daredevil LP/CD (1995 Bong Load)
- In Search of... LP/CD (1996 Mammoth)
- The Action Is Go LP/CD (1997 Mammoth)
- Godzilla's/Eatin' Dust (1999 Man's Ruin)
- King of the Road LP/CD (2000 Mammoth)
- California Crossing LP/CD (2001 Mammoth)
- Start the Machine CD (2004 DRT Entertainment)
- We Must Obey LP/CD (2007 Century Media/Liquor and Poker)
- Signs of Infinite Power LP/CD (2009 Century Media)
- Gigantoid LP/CD (2014 At the Dojo)
- Clone of the Universe LP/CD (2018 At the Dojo)
- The Return of Tomorrow LP/CD (2024 At the Dojo)

=== Singles and EPs ===
- "Kept Between Trees" 7-inch (1990 Slap-a-Ham Records)
- "Senioritis" 7-inch (1992 Zuma Records)
- "Pick-Up Summer" 7-inch (1992 Elastic Records)
- "Don't Bother Knockin' (If This Van's Rockin)" 7-inch (1992 Elastic Records)
- "Missing Link" 7-inch (1996 Mammoth)
- "Asphalt Risin'" 7-inch (1996 Mammoth)
- "Godzilla" 10-inch (1997 Man's Ruin)
- "Jailbreak" CD/split 7-inch with Fatso Jetson (1998 Sessions Records)
- "Eatin' Dust" 10-inch (1999 Man's Ruin)
- "Ride to Live (Live to Ride)" Twisted Forever Comp. (2001 Koch)
- "Something Beyond" CD/7" (2003 Elastic Records)
- "Hung Out to Dry" CD/7" (2006 Century Media)
- "Knew It All Along" 7-inch (2007 At the Dojo)
- "Beach Blanket Bongout" 7-inch (2009 At the Dojo)
- "Slow Ride / Future Transmitter" 7-inch (2016 At the Dojo)
- "Fu30, Pt. 1" 10-inch (2020 At the Dojo)
- "Fu30, Pt. 2" 10-inch (2022 At the Dojo)
- "Fu30, Pt. 3" 10-inch (2023 At the Dojo)

=== Compilation and live albums ===
- Return to Earth 91–93 LP/CD - 1998 - Elastic Records
- Go for It... Live! LP/CD - 2003 - Steamhammer
- Live at Roadburn 2003 LP/CD - 2019 - At The Dojo
- A Look Back: Dogtown & Z-Boys - 2021 - At The Dojo (soundtrack for short documentary movie)
- The Return of... Live - 2025 - At The Dojo

=== Singles and music videos ===
- "Tilt" (1995)
- "Asphalt Risin'" (1996)
- "Evil Eye" (1997)
- "King of the Road" (2001)
- "Squash That Fly" (2001)
- "Written in Stone" (2004)
- "Hung Out to Dry" (2007)
- "Thinkin' Out Loud" (2023)
