= Nebula/Lowrider =

EP by Nebula & Lowrider
- Released: April 27, 1999
- Recorded: 1998
- Genre: Stoner rock
- Length: 38:28
- Label: MeteorCity

Nebula chronology
Sun Creature (1999)	Nebula/Lowrider (1999)	To the Center (1999)

Lowrider chronology
Nebula/Lowrider (1999)	Ode to Io (2000)

Nebula/Lowrider is a double EP featuring the American stoner rock band Nebula and Swedish stoner rock band Lowrider. It was released on April 27, 1999, by MeteorCity.

== Track listing ==
=== Nebula ===
All music by Eddie Glass, all lyrics by Nebula.

1. "Anything from You" - 3:57
2. "Full Throttle" - 4:09
3. "Back to the Dawn" - 4:16
4. "Fall of Icarus" - 4:12

=== Lowrider ===
All music and lyrics by Peder.

1. "Lameneshma" - 4:57
2. "The Gnome, the Serpent, the Sun" - 5:24
3. "Shivaree" - 5:49
4. "Upon the Dune [Full Version]" - 5:42

== Credits ==
=== Nebula ===
- Tracks 1, 2, & 4 Recorded 8–98 at Private Radio, Seattle WA by Jack Endino
- Track 3 Recorded 6–98 at LoHo Studios NYC by Joe Hogan
- All Music by Eddie Glass
- Lyrics by Nebula
- 1998 Volcanic Pineapple ASCAP
- Artwork by Arik Roper

=== Lowrider ===
- Andreas Eriksson - Drums, Percussion
- Ole Hellquist - Lead Guitars, Vocals (1,2,4)
- Niclas Stalfors - Guitars, Vocals (4)
- Peder Bergstrand - Basses, Vocals (3,4), Guitars (4), Effects
- All Music & Lyrics by Peder
- Recorded at KM Studios, Karlskoga, Sweden 5/22/98-5/24/98 (1,3,4) & 8/28/98-8/30/98 (2)
- Mastered 8/31/98-9/2/98 at KM Karlskoga
- Except "Upon The Dune" (Full Version) by Chuck Lucero at the Santa Fe Center Studios

== Critical reception ==
Professional ratings
Review scores
Source	Rating
AllMusic	3/5 stars

Reception was generally positive of the combined album. CMJ approved of the combination of Nebula's dynamic tracks that shifted from quiet intros to earth-shaking guitar solos along with Lowrider's simpler groove tracks with their Black Sabbath influences. AllMusic also appreciated the combination, stating that between the two there were "few stylistic surprises, but [...] superb "yields" of crushing power chords and psychedelic, head-nodding grooves."
