= Nebula (band) =

American stoner rock band

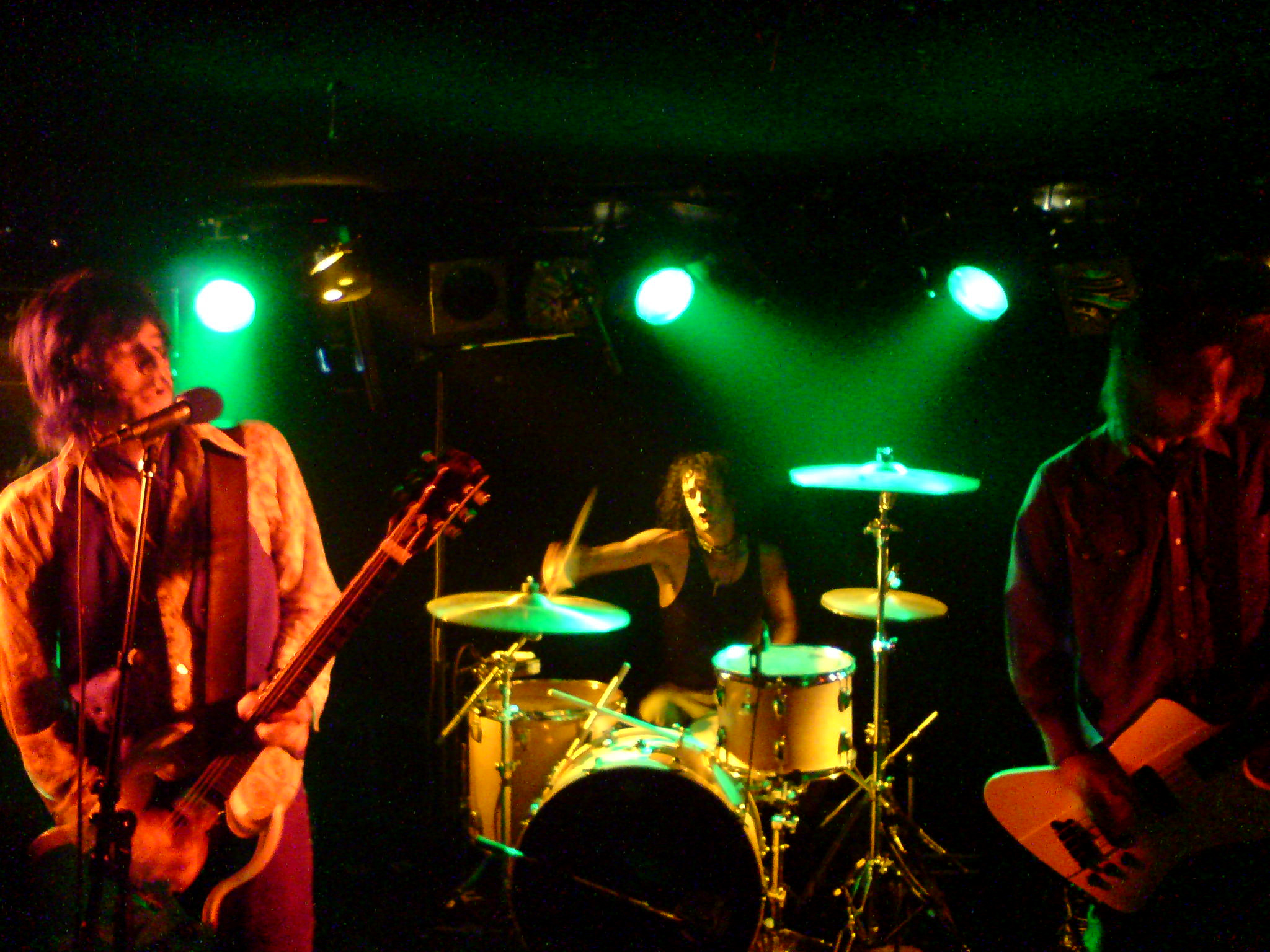
- Nebula performing live in 2008. From left to right: Eddie Glass, Rob Oswald and Tom Davies

Background information
- Origin: Los Angeles, California, U.S.
- Genres: Stoner rock; hard rock; psychedelic rock; desert rock
- Years active: 1997–2010; 2017–present
- Labels: Liquor And Poker; MeteorCity; Sub Pop; Tee Pee; Man's Ruin; Heavy Psych Sounds; Giant Rock
- Spinoff of: Fu Manchu
- Members: Eddie Glass; Michael Amster
- Past members: Ruben Romano; Mark Abshire; Tom Davies ✟ Rob Oswald; Dennis Wilson; Adam Kriney; Isaiah Mitchell; Jimmy Sweet; Ranch Sironi ✟
- Website: atomicritual.com

Nebula is an American stoner rock band formed by guitarist Eddie Glass and drummer Ruben Romano upon departing Fu Manchu in 1997.

Mark Abshire soon joined as the band's original bassist and remained with the band until the recording of Atomic Ritual, notably produced by Chris Goss. Dennis Wilson and Simon Moon (Eddie Glass) stepped in as bassists until a more permanent replacement was found in Tom Davies. Rob Oswald replaced founding member Ruben Romano on drums in 2007.

In August 2009, Adam Kriney, formerly of La Otracina, was recruited to replace departing drummer Oswald, though he too announced his departure in January 2010 and was replaced by Jimmy Sweet. In early 2010, Nebula announced that it was going on an indefinite hiatus. Glass later explained that "things started getting a bit rough with the touring and I got sick of it", though Nebula were merely "taking a break for a while" and not breaking up.

Nebula reunited in 2017 and now features drummer Michael Amster of Blaak Heat and Mondo Generator. The band released their sixth studio album, Holy Shit, on June 7, 2019, on the Heavy Psych Sounds Records label. Their seventh studio album, Transmission from Mothership Earth, was released on July 22, 2022.

Longtime bassist Tom Davies died from leukemia on September 5, 2023, at the age of 48. Touring bassist Ranch Sironi died in Rome on the morning of June 5, 2024, while the band was touring in Italy.

== Band members ==
Current members

- Eddie Glass – guitar, vocals (1997–present)
- Michael Amster – drums (2017–present)

Former members

- Mark Abshire – bass (1997–2003)
- Isaiah Mitchell – bass (2003)
- Dennis Wilson – bass (2003)
- Tom Davies – bass (2003–2023; his death)
- Ranch Sironi – bass (2019, 2023–2024; his death)
- Ruben Romano – drums (1997–2007)
- Rob Oswald – drums (2007–2009)
- Adam Kriney – drums (2009–2010)
- Jimmy Sweet – drums (2010)

== Discography ==
=== Studio albums ===
- To the Center – 1999 – Sub Pop
- Charged – 2001 – Sub Pop
- Atomic Ritual – 2003 – Liquor and Poker
- Apollo – 2006 – Liquor and Poker
- Heavy Psych – 2009 – Tee Pee
- Holy Shit – 2019 – Heavy Psych Sounds
- Transmission from Mothership Earth – 2022 – Heavy Psych Sounds

=== Split albums and EPs ===
- Nebula / That's All Folks! – Vulcan Bomber / Aquasphere – 1997 – Last Scream Records (Split 7")
- Let It Burn – 1998 – Tee Pee
- Sun Creature – 1999 – Man's Ruin (EP)
- Nebula/Lowrider – 1999 – MeteorCity (Split EP)
- Nebula – 2003 – Liquor and Poker
- Nebula / Winnebago Deal – Strange Human / Taking Care of Business – 2003 – Sweet Nothing (Split 7")
- Nebula / Quest for Fire – The Perfect Rapture / In the Place of a Storm – 2010 – Tee Pee (Split 7")
- Nebula / Black Rainbows – In Search of the Cosmic Tale ⁞ Crossing the Galactic Portal – 2024 – Heavy Psych Sounds

=== Live albums ===
- Peel Sessions – 2008 – Sweet Nothing
- Live in the Mojave Desert: Volume 2 – 2021 – Giant Rock, Heavy Psych Sounds
- Livewired in Europe – 2023 – Heavy Psych Sounds

=== Compilation albums ===
- Dos EPs – 2002 – MeteorCity
- Demos & Outtakes 98–02 – 2019 – Heavy Psych Sounds

=== Featured compilations ===
- In the Groove ("Full Throttle") – 1999 – The Music Cartel
- "High Times" High Volume: The Stoner Rock Collection ("The Void") – 2004 – High Times Records
