= Bong Load Records =

- Founded: 1991
- Founder: Tom Rothrock; Rob Schnapf; Bradshaw Lambert
- Status: Active
- Genre: Folk; stoner rock; desert rock; heavy metal
- Country of origin: United States
- Location: Los Angeles, California

Bong Load Records is an independent record label originally based in Los Angeles which was founded by producers Tom Rothrock and Rob Schnapf and partner Bradshaw Lambert.

Much of the Bong Load Records catalog is released in small quantities. Several bands have very rare releases that are much sought after and command high prices at auctions.

Bong Load Records relaunched on its 25th anniversary in 2016 with limited edition vinyl releases. Tom Rothrock sums up the label "Our core philosophy of the indie label was always about making high quality music with artists who have dedicated their lives to their craft – artists who otherwise might not have been heard."

== History ==
One of Bong Load Records' biggest signings was Beck in 1991. Beck's "Loser" single became the first number one, non-major label single since FM radio became mainstream. In 1998, Beck recorded the album Mutations intended for release on Bong Load Records but it was eventually released on the Geffen label. There were a series of lawsuits between Beck, Bong Load and Geffen, settled in 1999, which led to Beck's renegotiation with Geffen. Beck released multiple titles on Bong Load including Loser, Mellow Gold, Odelay, Mutations and Midnite Vultures.

Other notable bands from the original Bong Load Custom Records include Wool, Kyuss, The Obsessed, Fatso Jetson, Elliott Smith, Eels, L7, R.L. Burnside and Lutefisk. Stoner rock band Fu Manchu released their first two albums via Bong Load Records.

In 2007, Rothrock briefly relaunched the label with a series of releases, including his own instrumental album Resonator.

In July 2016, Bong Load Records announced a relaunch of the label, now based in Las Vegas, with 7 limited edition vinyl releases: The Killers (Sam’s Town - 10th Anniversary reissue), Mark Stoermer (Dark Arts), Masters of Reality (Deep In The Hole - 15th Anniversary reissue - features Chris Goss and guests Mark Lanegan, Josh Homme and members of Queens of the Stone Age and Kyuss) Elliott Smith (Figure 8, XO) and Beck (Odelay (20th Anniversary reissue), Mellow Gold).

== Discography ==
=== 2016 ===
- The Killers Sam's Town (10 Year Anniversary 2LP)
- Mark Storemer Dark Arts
- Masters of Reality Deep In The Hole (15 Year Anniversary LP)
- Elliott Smith Figure 8 (2016 reissue)
- Elliott Smith XO (2016 reissue)
- Beck Mellow Gold (2016 reissue)
- Beck Odelay (20 Year Anniversary LP)

=== 2007 ===
- Tom Rothrock Resonator
- Roman Carter Never Slow Down

=== 2001 ===
- Phil Tagliere Slow
- Richard Thompson Action Packed
- Various Acid Blues Remix 30 Daz
- Various Random Hostile Takeover
- Project K Testing Underway

=== 2000 ===
- Beck Midnite Vultures
- Elliott Smith Figure 8
- Eels Daisies of the Galaxy
- Dieselhed Chico and the Flute

=== 1999 ===
- Various Stoned Again: A Bong Long Records Collection
- Richard Thompson Mock Tudor
- L7 Slap Happy
- Fireball Ministry Ou est la Rock?
- Poolside Indyglow
- Dieselhed Elephant Rest Home
- Jon Brown 70 Years Coming (Acid Blues Label)
- Mountain Con MC Stands for Revolution (Acid Blues Label)
- Slo-Mo Novelty (Acid Blues Label)

=== 1998 ===
- Beck Mutations
- Fatso Jetson Toasted
- Famous Monsters In The Night
- Elliott Smith XO
- Sexy Death Soda California Police State
- Sexy Death Soda Janitor Strike
- R.L. Burnside Roolin' & Tumblin'
- Plastilina Mosh Aquamosh

=== 1996 ===
- Beck Odelay
- Lutefisk Burn in Hell Fuckers
- Andy Kaulkin Six Foot Seven & Rising
- Lutefisk Tin Man's Cue
- Kyuss/Wool Split 7" Shine/Short Term Memory Loss
- Crutch Sold By Weight
- Vitamade Everything You Need

=== 1995 ===
- Thrush Hermit Take Another Drag
- Quinine Regrets Only
- Lutefisk Deliver from Porcelain: Themes & Variations
- The Obsessed Altamont Nation
- Fu Manchu Daredevil
- Vitamade Vitamade
- Lutefisk Aerosol

=== 1994 ===
- Crutch Disgrunted Employee
- Beck Mellow Gold
- Beck Steve Threw Up
- Fu Manchu No One Rides For Free
- Wool Box Set LP w/7"

=== 1993 ===
- Beck Loser
- Wool Kill the Crow
- My Favorite Martian When The Anger's Too Strong
- Carnival of Souls Late Bloomer

=== 1992 ===
- Muzza Chunka Loaded
- Wool Mayday
- Further Filling Station
- Grimace Quagmire

=== 1991 ===
- Muzza Chunka This is a Chicken Lamp

== See also ==
- List of record labels
