= Liquor and Poker Music =

American record label

Liquor and Poker Music is an American rock music record label based in Hawthorne, California. Bands on the label are generally in the punk, stoner rock and heavy metal genres.

== Current artists ==
- American Heartbreak
- Backyard Babies
- Black Halos
- The Bones
- Crash Kelly
- Crucified Barbara
- Dirty Americans
- Fireball Ministry
- Fu Manchu
- Hanoi Rocks
- The Illuminati
- The Hellacopters
- Nebula
- Scott Reeder
- The Thieves

== See also ==
- List of record labels
