= Scott Reeder (drummer) =

American drummer

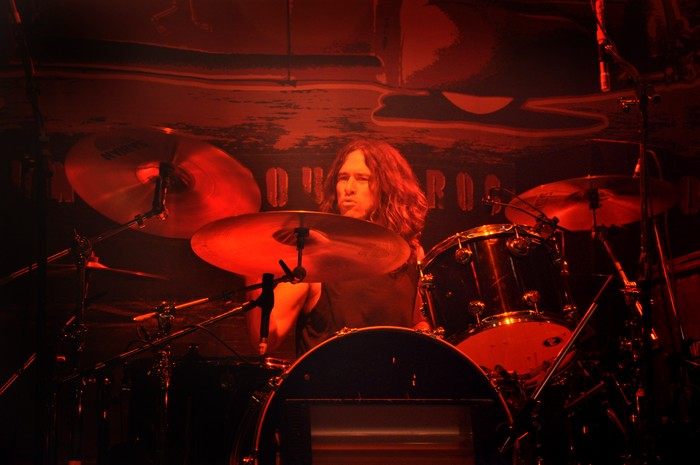
- Reeder with Social Distortion in 2010

Background information
- Born: Barstow, California, U.S.
- Occupation: Musician
- Instrument: Drums
- Member of: Fu Manchu; Sun and Sail Club
- Formerly of: Smile
- Website: scottreederdrummer.com

Scott Reeder is an American drummer who has been a member of Southern California stoner rock band Fu Manchu since 2002. Previously, he was a co-founder of the Orange County alternative rock band Smile. Reeder is known for his heavy drumming style, and refers to John Bonham of Led Zeppelin as one of his great influences.

Reeder plays Ludwig Drums (often sporting psychedelic colors), Sabian Cymbals, Evans Drumheads and uses Vic Firth drumsticks, as stated on his MySpace page. He has also been known to mix his Sabian cymbal setup with Zildjian cymbals.

With more than 25 years of drumming experience, Reeder teaches drumming in Orange County, when not touring or recording with Fu Manchu.

On March 10, 2010, it was announced that Reeder would play drums for Social Distortion for the South American tour dates in April. By July 2010, he was no longer drumming in Social Distortion and had returned to Fu Manchu for their upcoming tour. His replacement in Social Distortion was David Hidalgo Jr., formerly of Suicidal Tendencies and The Drips.

== Personal life ==
Reeder is not related to the bassist of Kyuss, despite the fact that they share the same first and last name and are stoner rock musicians. Coincidentally, they are both in a band called Sun and Sail Club which formed in September 2013 and features Fu Manchu guitarist Bob Balch.
