= Nick Oliveri discography =

This article lists the discography of Nick Oliveri. Oliveri is an American multi-instrumentalist who is best known for his work as a member of Kyuss and Queens of the Stone Age. Oliveri frequently contributes to the work of other artists as a solo artist, most notably on ...Like Clockwork, a 2013 Queens of the Stone Age album, for which he provided backing vocals on "If I Had a Tail".

== Releases ==
The following is a list of releases that include Nick Oliveri as an official band member.

=== Kyuss ===
- Wretch (1991, Dali)
- Blues for the Red Sun (1992, Dali)
- Muchas Gracias: The Best of Kyuss (2000, Elektra)

=== Queens of the Stone Age ===
- Rated R (2000, Interscope) (re-released 2010, Interscope)
- Songs for the Deaf (2002, Interscope)
- Stone Age Complication (2004, Interscope)

=== Mondo Generator ===
- Cocaine Rodeo (2000, Southern Lord) (2009, Impedance)
- A Drug Problem That Never Existed (2003, Ipecac)
- Use Once and Destroy Me (2004, Tornado) (DVD)
- III the EP (2004, Tornado)
- Dead Planet: SonicSlowMotionTrails (2006, Mother Tongue) / Dead Planet (2007, Sub Noize)
- Australian Tour EP (2008, Impedance)
- Dog Food EP (2010, Impedance)
- Hell Comes To Your Heart EP (2011, No Balls)
- Hell Comes To Your Heart (LP) (2012, Mondo Media)
- Split 7-inch EP w/ The Chuck Norris Experiment (2013, Strange Magic)
- The Best of Mondo Generator (2016, Heavy Psych Sounds)
- Fuck It (2020, Heavy Psych Sounds)
- Shooters Bible (2020, Heavy Psych Sounds)
- Live at Bronson (2021, Heavy Psych Sounds)
- We Stand Against You (2023, Heavy Psych Sounds)

=== Dwarves ===
- The Dwarves Are Young and Good Looking (1997, Recess, later Epitaph)
- The Dwarves Come Clean (2000, Epitaph)
- How To Win Friends And Influence People (2001, Reptilian)
- The Dwarves Must Die (2004, Sympathy for the Record Industry)
- The Dwarves Are Born Again (2011, MVD Audio)
- The Dwarves Invented Rock & Roll (2014, Recess)
- Radio Free Dwarves (2015, Riot Style / Greedy)
- Take Back the Night (2018, Burger / Greedy)
- Rex Everything (2018, Bang! / Greedy)
- The Dwarves Concept Album (2023, Greedy)

=== Solo ===
- Demolition Day (2004, Tornado)
- Death Acoustic (2009, Impedance)
- Nick Oliveri Vs The Chuck Norris Experiment (2012, No Balls)
- Nick Oliveri Vs HeWhoCannotBeNamed 7-inch split (2013, No Balls)
- Leave Me Alone (2014, Schnitzel) (released under the name "Nick Oliveri's Uncontrollable")
- N.O. Hits at All Vol.1 (2017, Heavy Psych Sounds)
- N.O. Hits at All Vol.2 (2017, Heavy Psych Sounds)
- N.O. Hits at All Vol.3 (2017, Heavy Psych Sounds)
- N.O. Hits at All Vol.4 (2018, Heavy Psych Sounds)
- N.O. Hits at All Vol.5 (2018, Heavy Psych Sounds)
- N.O. Hits at All Vol.666 (2020, Heavy Psych Sounds)
- N.O. Hits at All Vol.7 (2021, Heavy Psych Sounds)
- N.O. Hits at All Vol.8 (2024, Heavy Psych Sounds)
- N.O. Hits at All Vol.9 (2024, Heavy Psych Sounds)

=== Vista Chino ===
- Peace (2013, Napalm)

=== Bloodclot ===
- Up in Arms (2017, Metal Blade)

=== Stöner ===
- Live in the Mojave Desert: Volume 4 (2021, Heavy Psych Sounds / Giant Rock)
- Stoners Rule (2021, Heavy Psych Sounds)
- Totally... (2022, Heavy Psych Sounds)
- Boogie to Baja (2023, Heavy Psych Sounds)

== Collaborations ==
The following is a list of artists whose releases feature contributions from Nick Oliveri.

- Blag Dahlia Band – Lord of the Road (1994, Sympathy for the Record Industry)
- Blag Dahlia – Haunt Me (1995, Man's Ruin)
- Blag Dahlia – Venus With Arms (1996, Atavistic)
- Desert Sessions – Vols. 3&4 (1998, Man's Ruin)
- Desert Sessions – Vols. 5&6 (1999, Man's Ruin)
- River City Rapists – Feelin' Groovy (1999, Man's Ruin)
- Masters of Reality – Deep in the Hole (2001, Brownhouse)
- The Dangerous Lives of Altar Boys OST (2002, Milan)
- Rollins Band – Rise Above: 24 Black Flag Songs to Benefit the West Memphis Three (2002, Sanctuary)
- Masters of Reality – Flak 'n' Flight (2003, Brownhouse)
- Mark Lanegan Band – Here Comes That Weird Chill (2003, Beggars Banquet)
- Mark Lanegan Band – Bubblegum (2004, Beggar's Banquet)
- Eagles of Death Metal – Peace, Love, Death Metal (2004, AntAcidAudio)
- Melissa Auf der Maur – Auf der Maur (2004, Capitol)
- Turbonegro – Party Animals (2005, Bitzcore)
- Brats on the Beat: Ramones for Kids (2006, Go-Kart)
- Biblical Proof of UFOs – 8-Track Demo(n)s (2006, Cobraside Distribution, Inc.)
- Winnebago Deal – Flight of the Raven (2006, Fierce Panda)
- Winnebago Deal – "Spider Bite" (2006, Fierce Panda)
- Don't Open Your Eyes – "Don't Open Your Eyes" (2009, Flying with the Unicorn)
- Royce Cracker – "Doin' Watcha Say" (2009, Zodiac Killer)
- Slash – Slash (2010, Sony Music)
- Drink Fight Fuck Vol 4: 22 GG Allin Songs – "Outlaw Scumfuc" (2010, Zodiac Killer)
- HeWhoCannotBeNamed – Sunday School Massacre (2010, No Balls)
- Rescue Rangers – Manitoba (2012, Trendkill)
- Turbonegro – Sexual Harassment (2012, Scandinavian Leather)
- Queens of the Stone Age – ...Like Clockwork (2013, Matador)
- Loading Data – Double Disco Animal Style (2013, A Quick One)
- John Garcia – John Garcia (2014, Napalm)
- Teenage Time Killers – Teenage Time Killers: Greatest Hits Vol. 1 (2015, Rise)
- Svetlanas – Naked Horse Rider (2015, Altercation)
- Komatsu – Recipe for Murder One (2016, Argonauta)
- Svetlanas – This is Moscow Not L.A. (2017, Rad Girlfriend)
- Lujuria – Sextorsión (2017, Punch Your Face / Dulce Limon)
- Brant Bjork – Mankind Woman (2018, Heavy Psych Sounds)
- Supervillain – That Boy's a Beast (2019)
- Phil Campbell – Old Lions Still Roar (2019, Nuclear Blast)
- Big Scenic Nowhere – Dying on the Mountain (2019, Blues Funeral)
- Big Scenic Nowhere – Vision Beyond Horizon (2020, Satin / Heavy Psych Sounds)
- Svetlanas – Disco Sucks (2020, Demons Run Amok Entertainment)
- The Black Armada – "Up & Down Under" (2020, Beats Cartel) (released under the name "Nick Oliveri and The Black Armada")
- Full Tone Generator – Without a Sound / If You Want Me (2020, Golden Robot) (released under the name "Full Tone Generator & Nick Oliveri")
- Patrón – Patrón (2020, Klonosphere)
- Bram Stalker – "Dormant" (2021)
- Soldiers of Destruction – Cause and Affect (2021, American't)
- Gunash – All You Can Hit (2022, Golden Robot)
- Löve Me Förever: A Tribute to Motörhead (2022, Psycho Waxx)
- Brant Bjork – Bougainvillea Suite (2022, Heavy Psych Sounds)

== Singles ==
The following is a list of singles that include Nick Oliveri as an official band member.

Kyuss

- "Thong Song" (1992, Dali)
- "Green Machine" (1993, Dali)

Queens of the Stone Age

- "Infinity" – Heavy Metal 2000 OST (2000, Restless)
- "The Lost Art of Keeping a Secret" (2000, Interscope)
- "Feel Good Hit of the Summer" (2000, Interscope)
- "Monsters in the Parasol" (2000, Interscope)
- "Back to Dungaree High" – Alpha Motherfuckers – A Tribute to Turbonegro (2001, Bitzcore)
- "No One Knows / Tension Head" (live) – 7-inch (2002, Interscope)
- "Go with the Flow" – EP (2002, Interscope)
- "First It Giveth / Wake Up Screaming" – 7-inch (2003, Interscope)

Mondo Generator

- Split 7-inch Single w/ Jack Saints (1997, Milk*Sop)
- "I Never Sleep" – 7-inch (2006, Mother Tongue)
- "Turbonegro Must Be Destroyed" – Omega Motherfuckers (2013, Self Destructo)
- "Up Against the Void" – split 7-inch Australian tour split w/ Svetlanas (2019, Tuff Cuff)
- "When Death Comes" (2019, Heavy Psych Sounds)
- "Dead Silence" (2019, Heavy Psych Sounds)
- "Turboner" (2020, Heavy Psych Sounds)
- "Dead Silence – Live at Bronson" (2021, Heavy Psych Sounds)
- "Death March" (2023, Heavy Psych Sounds)
- "One Two Three Four" (2023, Heavy Psych Sounds)
- "Rubber Room" (2023, Heavy Psych Sounds)

Dwarves

- "Gentlemen Prefer Blondes" (1994, Man's Ruin)
- "Everybodies Girl" (1997, Recess)
- "We Must Have Blood" (1997, Man's Ruin)
- "I Will Deny" (1998, Reptilian)
- "Salt Lake City" (2004, Sympathy for the Record Industry)
- "You Got Nothing" – split 7-inch single w/ Svetlanas (2016, Greedy / Altercation)
- "Devil's Level" (2017, Cleopatra)
- "We Will Dare" (2023, Greedy)
- "Roxette" (2023, Greedy)

Solo

- "Human Cannonball Explodes" (2014, Schnitzel) (released under the name "Nick Oliveri's Uncontrollable")

Vista Chino

- "Sweet Remain" (2013, Napalm)
- "Barcelonian" (2013, Napalm)

Bloodclot

- "Up In Arms" (2016, Metal Blade)
- "Kali" (2017, Metal Blade)
- "Manic" (2017, Metal Blade)
- "Slow Kill Genocide" (2017, Metal Blade)

Stöner

- "Nothin'" (2021, Heavy Psych Sounds)
- "Rad Stays Rad" (2021, Heavy Psych Sounds)
- "A Million Beers" (2022, Heavy Psych Sounds)
- "Party March" (2022, Heavy Psych Sounds)
- "Strawberry Creek (Dirty Feet)" (2022, Heavy Psych Sounds)
- "City Kids" (2022, Heavy Psych Sounds)
- "It Ain't Free" (2022, Heavy Psych Sounds)
- "Night Tripper vs. No Brainer" (2023, Heavy Psych Sounds)
