= N.O. Hits at All =

Compilation album series

N.O. Hits at All are a series of compilation albums by American musician Nick Oliveri, released through Heavy Psych Sounds Records. The tracks used on these albums are from bands Oliveri has provided vocals for either as a member or a guest.

== Background ==
In November 2016, Oliveri announced the release of a series of compilation albums titled, N.O. Hits at All, to be issued on Heavy Psych Sounds Records. As of 2024, nine volumes have been released.

== Track listings ==
=== N.O. Hits at All Vol.1 ===
N.O. Hits at All Vol.1 was released on January 27, 2017.

No.	Title	Performed by	Length
1.	"Lockdown"	Komatsu	3:54
2.	"Anything and Everything"	Death Acoustic	2:13
3.	"Revenge"	Winnebago Deal	0:54
4.	"Speedfreak"	Svetlanas	2:52
5.	"Time to Think / Surf&Destroy"	Death Acoustic	4:34
6.	"Eccentric Man"	Ken Pustelnik's Groundhogs	4:21

Notes

- "Anything and Everything" is an acoustic version of the song "Anything That Moves", which appears on Vol.5.

=== N.O. Hits at All Vol.2 ===
N.O. Hits at All Vol.2 was released on July 7, 2017.

No.	Title	Performed by	Length
1.	"We Only Came to Get High"	Dwarves	1:26
2.	"Nothing at All"	Royale Daemons	4:00
3.	"Back to Dungaree High" (Turbonegro cover)	Queens of the Stone Age	3:03
4.	"Wastoid"	You Know Who	2:04
5.	"John Lawman / Green Machine"	Nick Oliveri	5:59
6.	"In the Butt"	Lightnin' Woodcock	3:31

Notes

- "Green Machine" is an acoustic version of the Kyuss song of the same name from the album Blues for the Red Sun.
- "Back to Dungaree High" is taken from the Turbonegro tribute album Alpha Motherfuckers.

=== N.O. Hits at All Vol.3 ===
N.O. Hits at All Vol.3 was released on October 20, 2017.

No.	Title	Performed by	Length
1.	"R'N'R Outlaw" (Rose Tattoo cover)	Royale Daemons	2:54
2.	"Luv Is Fiction"	Dwarves	2:51
3.	"Medication"	He Who Can Not Be Named	3:21
4.	"Kyuss Dies!"	Kyuss Lives!	3:43
5.	"Country as Fuck"	Plan B	2:15
6.	"The Mob Rules" (Black Sabbath cover)	Melissa Auf der Maur's Hand of Doom	2:57

Notes

- "Luv Is Fiction" is one of three separate recordings/reworkings of the song. The second version being featured in the Dwarves album The Dwarves Invented Rock & Roll, and the third in Leave Me Alone.
- "Kyuss Dies!" is listed as being performed by Kyuss Lives!, despite the band having changed its name to Vista Chino. This indicates that the song may have been recorded while the band was still operating under the former moniker. The song was later rerecorded for the Mondo Generator album, Fuck It.

=== N.O. Hits at All Vol.4 ===
N.O. Hits at All Vol.4 was released on February 23, 2018.

No.	Title	Performed by	Length
1.	"Walk On"	The Uncontrollable	2:41
2.	"Identify, Isolate, Manipulate"	Biblical Proof of UFOs	2:34
3.	"Endless Vacation" (Ramones cover)	Death Acoustic	1:41
4.	"Hanging Low"	Loading Data	4:22
5.	"Fuck You Up and Get High"	Dwarves	0:35
6.	"Super Hero"	He Who Can Not Be Named	2:16
7.	"Don't Believe"	Rattlin' Bones	2:18
8.	"Susy Is a Headbanger" (Ramones cover)	Jennifer Finch's Brats on the Beat	2:09

Notes

- "Walk On" is a reworking of "Come and You're Gone" from Oliveri's solo album, Leave Me Alone.
- "Super Hero" features Oliveri on vocals rather than Blag Dahlia on the original version from the HeWhoCannotBeNamed album Love.

=== N.O. Hits at All Vol.5 ===
N.O. Hits at All Vol.5 was released on October 12, 2018.

No.	Title	Performed by	Length
1.	"It's You I Don't Believe"	Dwarves	1:32
2.	"Head" (Simon Stokes cover)	Simon Strokes	1:25
3.	"976 - Whore"	Mondo Generator	3:02
4.	"Won't Let Me Go"	Death Acoustic	3:44
5.	"People Suck"	Svetlanas	1:35
6.	"Crashed Out and Burnt"	The Situationalists	1:40
7.	"Anything That Moves"	Dwarves	2:07
8.	"Campfire Kyuss"	Death Acoustic	5:38

Notes

- "It's You I Don't Believe" and "Anything That Moves" are two songs taken from the Dwarves' album Take Back the Night. The former song was rerecorded for Mondo Generator's Fuck It.
- "Anything and Everything" from Vol.1 and "Anything That Moves" are the same song, aside from the former being an acoustic version and the latter being a studio version with the Dwarves.
- The artwork for Vol.5 contains ball-peen hammers with blood on them. This is most likely a reference to the Roky Erickson song "Bloody Hammer", upon which Oliveri recorded a cover version for with Queens of the Stone Age and Mondo Generator.
- "Campfire Kyuss" consists of acoustic versions of various Kyuss songs, including "Gardenia" from Welcome to Sky Valley, and "The Law", "Big Bikes" and "I'm Not", all from Wretch.
- "976 Whore" is a reworking of "Night Calls" from the Mondo Generator album Hell Comes to Your Heart. A re-recorded shorter version of the song later appeared on Mondo Generator's Shooters Bible.
- "Won't Let Me Go" is an acoustic version of "Won't Let Go", also from Hell Comes to Your Heart. The latter was later re-recorded and appeared on Shooters Bible.

=== N.O. Hits at All Vol.666 ===
N.O. Hits All Vol.666 was released on March 6, 2020.

No.	Title	Performed by	Length
1.	"Bleed Alright"	Dwarves	2:53
2.	"Life as One"	Nick Oliveri's Uncontrollable	1:39
3.	"U.S.A."	Nick Oliveri's Death Acoustic (credited to Stöner)	2:05
4.	"You Turn Me On"	Dwarves	3:29
5.	"Listening to the Daze (Portland Demo Session)"	Mondo Generator	3:29
6.	"The Cure"	H.O.D. "High On Pussy"	2:39
7.	"Behind the Walls (Intro)"	Starring Blag Dahlia as Rex Everything	0:47
8.	"I Love You to Death"	V.L.D. "Virgin Lovers Die"	3:14
9.	"Fuck 'Em All (Atlanta Session)"	I.O.D. "Infected Organ Donors"	1:22
10.	"Bite It You Scum"	Nick Oliveri's Death Acoustic	3:13
11.	"S.V.E.T.L.A.N.A.S."	Two Headed Dog
12.	"In Pieces"	Mondo Generator	4:10

Notes

- Two separate track listings of this album exist, with the songs "The Cure" and "S.V.E.T.L.A.N.A.S." being replaced on the other version by "Lovely Bong" by The Young Tuffs, and "Auto 2000 Demo Session 2000" by Stöner, respectively.
- "Fuck 'Em All" is a reworking of the song of the same name from the Dwarves album, Thank Heaven for Little Girls, and features Oliveri on vocals instead of Blag Dahlia.
- "Bite It You Scum" is an acoustic cover of the song of the same name by GG Allin.
- "In Pieces" is a reworking of the song "Like a Bomb" from the Mondo Generator album, Dead Planet.

=== N.O. Hits at All Vol.7 ===
N.O. Hits at All Vol.7 was released on July 2, 2021.

No.	Title	Performed by	Length
1.	"Bram Stalker"	Bram Stalker	2:54
2.	"I Am Your Sun"	Death Machine II (DMII)	3:38
3.	"Up & Down Under"	Nick Oliveri & The Black Armada	3:13
4.	"ME 262"	Captain Dick & The Seamen	5:06
5.	"Infected"	Nick Oliveri's Death Acoustic	2:31
6.	"Without a Sound"	Full Tone Generator	2:02
7.	"Predators"	Gunash	2:15
8.	"Disease with No Control"	Nick Oliveri's Uncontrollable	3:13
9.	"Warning"	Nick Oliveri's Death Acoustic	2:22
10.	"I Want You / She's So Heavy"	Mondo Generator	7:46

Notes

- "Bram Stalker" was originally titled "Dormant" for its single release by Bram Stalker.
- "Disease with No Control" is a rerecording of the version that appeared on Mondo Generator's Fuck It.

=== N.O. Hits at All Vol.8 ===
N.O. Hits at All Vol.8 was released on January 19, 2024.

No.	Title	Performed by	Length
1.	"Chains and Shackles"	Slash, Eric Valentine, Josh Freese, Nick Oliveri	4:31
2.	"Truth Is Stranger Than Fiction"	Nick Oliveri's Death Acoustic	2:54
3.	"I'm Not Dead"	He Who Can Not Be Named (with Rex Everything)	2:46
4.	"Back Off Boogaloo"	Nick Oliveri and the Drug Store Cowboy	3:59
5.	"The Lords Are Here to Ride"	Death Machine III	3:16
6.	"She Wanted to Leave"	Nick Oliveri's Death Acoustic	1:49
7.	"Outlaw Scumfuc"	Nick Oliveri's Death Acoustic	5:26

=== N.O. Hits at All Vol.9 ===
N.O. Hits at All Vol.9 was released on January 19, 2024.

No.	Title	Performed by	Length
1.	"Death March"	Temple of Deimos (with Nick Oliveri)	2:43
2.	"Blast Off"	Nick Oliveri's Uncontrollable	1:50
3.	"Twitter Troll"	Dead End America	1:29
4.	"Up Against the Void"	Mondo Generator	2:21
5.	"Blow Up the Embassy"	Nick Oliveri's Death Acoustic	2:25
6.	"Road Warrior"	Death Machine II	3:44
7.	"Conspiracy (Fact or Theory)"	Mondo Generator	4:08
8.	"Consider Me"	Nick Oliveri's Death Acoustic	2:51
9.	"Take Aim"	Nebula (with Nick Oliveri)	5:07
