= Hell Comes to Your Heart =

Studio album by Mondo Generator
- Released: July 3, 2012
- Recorded: November 17–19, 2010
- Studio: Pink Duck Studios, Burbank, California
- Genre: Alternative metal
- Length: 37:59
- Label: Mondo Media, Cobraside Distribution
- Producer: Mondo Generator, Harper Hug

Mondo Generator chronology
Hell Comes to Your Heart (EP) (2011)	Hell Comes to Your Heart (2012)	The Best of Mondo Generator (2016)

Alternative cover
- Cover of vinyl release

Hell Comes to Your Heart is the fourth studio album by Mondo Generator, released on Nick Oliveri's vanity label, Mondo Media, in 2012 and distributed worldwide through Cobraside Distribution.

== Track listing ==
All tracks are written by Nick Oliveri and Hoss Wright.

No.	Title	Length
1.	"Dead Silence"	2:23
2.	"The Way I Let You Down"	3:06
3.	"Burn the Bridge"	3:39
4.	"Won't Let Go"	3:59
5.	"Like the Sky"	3:59
6.	"This Isn't Love"	2:52
7.	"The Dirt Beneath"	2:57
8.	"Hang 'Em High"	3:12
9.	"Central Nervous System High School"	2:48
10.	"Smashed Apart"	3:15
11.	"Night Calls"	2:44
12.	"The Last Train"	4:00
Total length:		37:59

== Personnel ==
=== Band members ===
- Nick Oliveri – vocals, bass, guitar
- Hoss Wright – drums, percussion
- Ian Taylor – guitar

=== Additional musicians ===
- C.J. Ramone – backing vocals (Tracks 2, 4)
- Josh Homme – guitar, backing vocals (Track 12)
- John Garcia – backing vocals (Tracks 4, 12)
- Blag the Ripper – backing vocals (Track 11)
- Marc Diamond – guitar (Tracks 2, 5, 8, 11)
- Brendon Henderson – guitar (Tracks 6, 7, 9)
- Chris Henry – guitar (Tracks 2, 12)
- Sasha Vallely (credited as Sasha Mobster) – voice (Track 11)

== Trivia ==
- The album was recorded in 3 days at Josh Homme's Pink Duck Studios in Burbank, California by Justin Smith.
- This album marks the first time that Nick Oliveri and his previous bandmate, Josh Homme, have recorded music together since their well-publicized falling out in early 2004.
- Homme appears on lead guitar on the final track, "The Last Train." Also appearing on that song is Homme and Oliveri's previous bandmate in Kyuss and Kyuss Lives!, John Garcia. The song was recorded before Homme and Scott Reeder filed suit against Garcia and Brant Bjork over the Kyuss band name.
- In 2020, an early version of the album titled Shooters Bible was released by Oliveri's current label Heavy Psych Sounds Records. The album was originally recorded in 2010. It features some tracks with different titles and/or in a different order than Hell Comes to Your Heart; for example, "The Dirt Beneath" is titled "We Are Mondo Generator". It also includes the cover of Iggy Pop song "Dog Food".
