= Dog food (disambiguation) =

Dog food is food specifically intended for consumption by dogs.

Dog food or dogfood may also refer to:

- Dog Food (EP), an EP by Mondo Generator
- Dog meat, human consumption of canines
- Eating your own dog food, internal use of a company's own products
- "Dog Food" (The Apprentice), a 2023 television episode
