= Shock to the System (Part One) =

EP by Daughtry
- Released: September 27, 2024
- Length: 21:28
- Label: Dogtree; Big Machine Rock
- Producer: Scott Stevens; Marti Frederiksen

Daughtry chronology
Dearly Beloved (2021)	Shock to the System (Part One) (2024)	Shock to the System (Part Two) (2025)

Singles from Shock to the System (Part One)
- 1. "Artificial" Released: August 11, 2023; 2. "Pieces" Released: March 22, 2024; 3. "The Dam" Released: September 27, 2024

Professional ratings
Review scores
Source	Rating
Sputnikmusic	4.5/5

Shock to the System (Part One) is the second EP by American rock band Daughtry. Serving as a follow-up to Dearly Beloved (2021), it was released on September 27, 2024, through Big Machine Records' sub-label Big Machine Rock. In its first week of release, the EP debuted at number 23 on the US Top Album Sales chart, selling 3,000 album equivalent units.

== Track listing ==
All tracks are written by Chris Daughtry, Marti Frederiksen, and Scott Stevens with additional writers noted where applicable. All tracks are produced by Frederiksen and Stevens.

Shock to the System (Part One) track listing
No.	Title	Writer(s)	Length
1.	"The Reckoning"		3:00
2.	"Artificial"		3:40
3.	"Pieces"		4:04
4.	"Shock to the System"		3:17
5.	"Nervous"		3:26
6.	"The Dam"	Daughtry; Frederiksen; Stevens; Elvio Fernandes; Johnny Cummings	4:01
Total length:			21:28

iTunes bonus tracks
No.	Title	Length
7.	"Artificial (music video)"	3:48
8.	"Pieces (music video)"	4:32
Total length:		29:28

== Personnel ==
- Chris Daughtry – lead vocals, rhythm guitar
- Brian Craddock – lead guitar
- Elvio Fernandes – keyboards, backing vocals
- Marty O'Brien – bass
- Jeremy Schaffer – drums

=== Additional personnel ===
- Marti Frederiksen – production, digital editing, programming
- Scott Stevens – production, digital editing, programming, additional guitars
- Evan Frederiksen – recording engineering, digital editing
- Chris Baseford – mixing
- Ted Jensen – mastering

== Charts ==
Chart performance for Shock to the System (Part One)
Chart (2024)	Peak position
UK Albums Downloads (OCC)	30
US Top Album Sales (Billboard)	23
US Top Current Album Sales (Billboard)	22
