= Hell Comes to Your Heart (EP) =

EP by Mondo Generator
- Released: April 10, 2011
- Genre: Alternative metal, stoner rock
- Label: No Balls Records
- Producer: Bradley Cook

Mondo Generator chronology
Dog Food (2010)	Hell Comes to Your Heart (EP) (2011)	Hell Comes to Your Heart (2012)

Hell Comes to Your Heart is an EP released by Mondo Generator on April 10, 2011. It contains four songs and served as an upcoming teaser for their studio album of the same name released in July 2012.

== Track listing ==
All lyrics are written by Nick Oliveri; all music is composed by Oliveri and Hoss Wright.

No.	Title	Length
1.	"Dead Silence"	2:23
2.	"This Isn't Love"	2:52
3.	"The Way I Let You Down"	3:06
4.	"Smashed Apart"	3:15

== Personnel ==
- Nick Oliveri – bass, vocals
- Hoss Wright – drums, percussion
- Christopher Henry – guitars
- Ian Flannon Taylor – guitars
- Marc Diamond – guitars
- Michael Hateley – guitars
- Michele Madden – additional vocals on "This Isn't Love"
- Bradley Cook – production, recording, mixing
- Steffen Winkler – artwork
