= Molly McGuire =

American musician

- Also known as: Magwire
- Born: 1971 (age 53–54); Ontario, Canada
- Genres: Desert rock; punk rock; alternative
- Occupation(s): Visual artist, musician
- Instruments: Bass; vocals; accordion; xylophone; piano; percussion
- Labels: Scat Records
- Formerly of: Gnarltones; Yellow #5; The Spores; Rhudabega; Mondo Generator

Molly McGuire is a Canadian musician and visual artist based in New Orleans. As a visual artist, she works under the moniker "Magwire" and frequently features at the New Orleans Jazz & Heritage Festival. As a musician, McGuire has performed and recorded with various acts, including Queens of the Stone Age, Mondo Generator, Mark Lanegan, Martina Topley-Bird, Nick Oliveri and Frank Black.

== Musical career ==
Originally from Ontario, Canada, McGuire relocated to New Orleans where she met guitarist Dave Catching. The two played together in the punk band Gnarltones, before McGuire formed her own band, Rhudabega. Following the break-up of Rhudabega, McGuire relocated to Los Angeles in 2001. Together with Catching, drummer Brant Bjork and her brother, Brenndan, McGuire recorded the album Demon Crossing in 2003 as the band Yellow #5. McGuire next formed The Spores, with guitarist Greg Biribauer and drummer Kenny Pierce. The band released the album Imagine the Future and, using McGuire's background as a visual artist, toured with an elaborate stage show. Though they toured as the opening act for the Eagles of Death Metal, the band was dropped from the tour due to infighting. Throughout her musical career, McGuire has performed and recorded with Mark Lanegan, Martina Topley-Bird, Mondo Generator, Nick Oliveri, Queens of the Stone Age, and Frank Black. McGuire stopped touring in 2007.

== Visual arts career ==
In 1990, McGuire enrolled in a two-year sign-painting course at George Brown College. In 2008, she moved back to New Orleans and started working as the manager of the Bywater Art Loft while focusing on her arts career. As a visual artist, McGuire's canvases center around the theme of "Circus Banners of the Mind." In 2014, she painted the complete line of circus banners for the 20th Century Fox television series American Horror Story: Freak Show. Working under the moniker “Magwire,” McGuire's art is created from re-appropriated canvas drop cloths and custom tinted house paint salvaged from movie sets. The banners tend to reflect contemporary folklore and mythology presented as a carnival advertisement, or circus banner.

McGuire's work has been shown internationally and she is a yearly fixture in the art pavilions of the New Orleans Jazz & Heritage Festival. In 2012 she received a first-place award from the New Orleans Press Club for “Best Editorial Illustration,” which appeared on the cover of Offbeat Magazine's 50th Anniversary of the Preservation Jazz Hall Band.

== Selected discography ==
- Imagine the Future – The Spores
- Doom Pop – The Spores
- What Gives? – The Spores
- Demon Crossing – Yellow #5
- Songs for the Deaf – Queens of the Stone Age
- A Drug Problem That Never Existed – Mondo Generator
- III The EP – Mondo Generator
- Dead Planet – Mondo Generator
- Bubblegum – Mark Lanegan
- Demolition Day – Nick Oliveri
- Hello Radio: The Songs of They Might Be Giants – bass/vocals on "Road Movie to Berlin" with Frank Black
