= Pieces (Daughtry song) =

2024 song by Daughtry

Single by Daughtry

from the EP Shock to the System (Part One)
- Released: March 22, 2024
- Length: 4:04
- Label: Dogtree; Big Machine Rock
- Songwriters: Chris Daughtry; Scott Stevens; Marti Frederiksen
- Producers: Stevens; Frederiksen

Daughtry singles chronology
"Artificial" (2023)	"Pieces" (2024)	"The Dam" (2024)

Pieces (Broken Down) single

Music video
- "Pieces" on YouTube

"Pieces" is a song by American rock band Daughtry. Released on March 22, 2024, as the second single from Shock to the System (Part One), it became Daughtry's second number-one song on the Billboard Mainstream Rock Airplay chart.

== Background ==
Frontman Chris Daughtry said that although the song came together quickly, there were aspects of its arrangement that "weren't sitting right". After revisiting the song following the band's tour, he played an idea on acoustic guitar and sent it to his producer. Daughtry said that he had "stopped subscribing" to the rules of songwriting, adding that "the song has to speak and let that dictate where it ends". He said that the song was inspired by the loss of his mother and daughter, a week apart in 2021. Daughtry also said that "we all go through [or] we're going to go through something that really shakes us and really rocks our world and shatters our reality", adding that "we can either let that destroy us or we can learn how to live with what's left". In a separate statement, he described the song as being about finding the strength to "pick up those broken pieces, face the darkness head on, and fight your way toward the light". Daughtry added that it gave him "some level of comfort" knowing that someone else could "hear their story in this".

== Release and reception ==
The track was released as the second single from Shock to the System (Part One) through Big Machine Label Group. The song's official music video was released on April 4, 2024.

In an EP staff review, Sputnikmusic's Shamus described "Pieces" as one of the album's more "hopeful" tracks. In a 2025 interview with Revolver, Daughtry said that listeners had shared stories about how "Pieces" helped them through hard times. He recalled fans sharing such stories in the comments during the premiere of the song's music video.

== Track listing ==
All tracks are written by Scott Stevens, Marti Frederiksen and Chris Daughtry. All tracks are produced by Stevens and Frederiksen, including additional where noted.

"Pieces" single
No.	Title	Length
1.	"Pieces"	4:04
2.	"Artificial"	3:39
Total length:		7:43

"Pieces (Broken Down)" single
No.	Title	Producer(s)	Length
1.	"Pieces"		4:04
2.	"Pieces (Broken Down)"	Daughtry	4:25
3.	"Artificial"		3:39
Total length:			12:09

Notes

- All tracks stylized in all caps, excluding "Pieces" single on Apple Music.

== Chart performance ==
"Pieces" reached number one on the Billboard Mainstream Rock Airplay chart on September 7, 2024, becoming the band's second leader on the chart following "Artificial". The song became their sixth top-ten hit on the chart and the band's third consecutive top-ten entry.

== Personnel ==
Credits adapted from Apple Music.

Daughtry

- Chris Daughtry – lead vocals, guitar, songwriter
- Brian Craddock – guitar
- Elvio Fernandes – background vocals, keyboards
- Jeremy Schaffer – drums
- Marty O'Brien – bass guitar

Additional musician

- Scott Stevens – guitar, programming, songwriter, producer, recording engineer

Additional credits

- Marti Frederiksen – songwriter, producer, recording engineer
- Evan Frederiksen – recording engineer
- Chris Baseford – mixing engineer
- Ted Jensen – mastering engineer

== Charts ==
=== Weekly charts ===
Weekly chart performance for "Pieces"
Chart (2024)	Peak position
UK Singles Sales (OCC)	82
UK Singles Downloads (Official Charts)	77
US Rock & Alternative Airplay (Billboard)	11
US Mainstream Rock Airplay (Billboard)	1

=== Year-end charts ===
Year-end chart performance for "Pieces"
Chart (2024)	Position
US Mainstream Rock Airplay (Billboard)	3

Chart (2025)	Position
Canada Mainstream Rock (Billboard)	98
