= Artificial (Daughtry song) =

2023 single by Daughtry

Single by Daughtry

from the album Shock to the System (Part One)
- Released: August 10, 2023
- Genre: Rock
- Length: 3:40
- Label: Dogtree; Big Machine
- Songwriters: Chris Daughtry; Scott Stevens; Marti Frederiksen

Daughtry singles chronology
"Changes Are Coming" (2021)	"Artificial" (2023)	"Pieces" (2024)

Music video
- "Artificial" on YouTube

"Artificial" is a song by American rock band Daughtry. Released on August 10, 2023 as the lead single from part one of the band's two-part EP Shock to the System, it is the first single by Daughtry to reach the number one spot on the Mainstream Rock chart.

== Charts ==
=== Weekly charts ===
Weekly chart performance for "Artificial"
Chart (2023–24)	Peak position
Canada Rock (Billboard)	14
Germany Rock Airplay (Official German Charts)	25
UK Singles Downloads (Official Charts)	100
US Hot Hard Rock Songs (Billboard)	9
US Rock & Alternative Airplay (Billboard)	12
US Mainstream Rock (Billboard)	1

=== Year-end charts ===
Year-end chart performance for "Artificial"
Chart (2024)	Position
US Rock Airplay (Billboard)	42

== Release history ==
Release history and formats for "Artificial"
Country	Date	Format	Label	Ref.
Various	August 10, 2023	Digital download; streaming	Big Machine Records	
