= Demon Crossing =

Studio album by Yellow #5
- Released: April 5, 2005
- Studios: Rancho de la Luna, Joshua Tree
- Genre: Rock
- Label: Scat Records
- Producers: Brendan McGuire, Greg Biribauer, Molly McGuire

Professional ratings
Review scores
| Source | Rating |
|---|---|
| Allmusic | 3.5/5 stars |

Demon Crossing is an album released by rock band Yellow #5 in 2005.

== Track listing ==
All tracks are written by Molly McGuire, except where noted.

| No. | Title | Writer(s) | Length |
|---|---|---|---|
| 1. | "Demon Crossing" | | 2:13 |
| 2. | "Auto Pilot" | | 6:25 |
| 3. | "No Loitering" | | 3:36 |
| 4. | "Screaming Mimi" | | 4:14 |
| 5. | "Moon Man" | | 5:22 |
| 6. | "Bad Girl" | Dave Catching | 0:32 |
| 7. | "Seven Addictions" | | 5:34 |
| 8. | "Lust" | | 3:12 |
| 9. | "ICFCFBM" | | 4:30 |
| 10. | "Seven Addictions" | | 3:04 |
| 11. | "Hair of the Dog" | | 3:37 |
| 12. | "Herman R. Miller, Esq. III" | | 0:19 |
| 13. | "Wine-Spo-Dee-O-Dee" (Stick McGhee cover) | | 2:44 |
| 14. | "Deviant Angel" | | 4:35 |
| 15. | "Cut Off, LA" | Catching | 1:25 |

== Band members ==
- Molly McGuire – bass, vocals, accordion, xylophone, piano, percussion, producer, cover artwork
- Dave Catching – guitar, lap steel guitar, photography (back cover)
- Brant Bjork – drums
- Jose Medeles – percussion (11), drums (13)
- Bay Woodyard – backing vocals (3)
- Gavin North – backing vocals (3)
- Chris Goss – harmony vocals (5)
- Jason Monsef – kick drum (13)
- Brenndan McGuire – producer, engineer, mixer (5), percussion (1)
- Greg Biribauer – producer, mixer
- Brian Gardner – mastering
- Steve Berson – mastering (DMM)
- Robert Griffin – layout
