= III the EP =

EP by Mondo Generator
- Released: November 22, 2004
- Recorded: 2004
- Genre: Alternative metal, stoner rock
- Length: 24:37
- Label: Tornado Records
- Producer: Nick Oliveri

Mondo Generator chronology
| A Drug Problem That Never Existed (2003) | III the EP (2004) | Dead Planet: SonicSlowMotionTrails (2006) |

Professional ratings
Review scores
| Source | Rating |
|---|---|
| AllMusic | 4/5 stars |

III the EP is an extended play record released by Mondo Generator on November 22, 2004, by Tornado Records. This was the first release after Nick Oliveri was fired from Queens of the Stone Age. Mondo Generator embarked on a short European tour in support of this release in late 2004.

The track "All The Way Down" would later be re-recorded for Mondo Generator's next album Dead Planet: SonicSlowMotionTrails, while all tracks except "Six Shooter" was re-released on Oliveri's 2004 solo acoustic album Demolition Day, and on the 2007 re-release of Dead Planet.

== Track listing ==
| No. | Title | Writer(s) | Length |
|---|---|---|---|
| 1. | "All The Way Down" | Nick Oliveri | 2:56 |
| 2. | "Bloody Hammer" (Roky Erickson & The Aliens cover) | Roky Erickson | 5:21 |
| 3. | "Six Shooter" (live) | Josh Homme; Oliver | 1:23 |
| 4. | "There She Goes Again" | Oliveri | 1:26 |
| 5. | "Sleep The Lie Away" | Alfredo Hernández; Dave Catching; Molly McGuire; Oliveri | 13:31 |
| Total length: | | | 24:37 |

== Personnel ==
- Nick Oliveri – vocals, bass (1, 3, 4)
- Dave Catching – guitars
- Molly McGuire – bass (2), piano (4)
- Alfredo Hernández – drums
- Mathias Schneeberger – co-producer, recording, mixing (1, 2, 4, 5), mastering, piano (1, 2), guitar (1)
- Deborah Viereck – artwork
