= Cocaine Rodeo =

Studio album by Mondo Generator
- Released: July 18, 2000; August 11, 2009 (reissue); July 24, 2020 (20th anniversary repress)
- Recorded: 1997
- Studio: Monkey Studios, Palm Desert, California
- Genre: Stoner rock, alternative rock
- Length: 36:16
- Label: Southern Lord; Impedance Records (2009 reissue); Heavy Psych Sounds Records (2020 repress)
- Producer: Nick Oliveri

Mondo Generator chronology
Cocaine Rodeo (2000)	A Drug Problem That Never Existed (2003)

Alternative cover
- Impedance reissue

Reissue cover
- Heavy Psych Sounds repress

Professional ratings
Review scores
Source	Rating
AllMusic	4/5 stars

Cocaine Rodeo is the debut studio album by American rock band Mondo Generator, released through Southern Lord Records on 18 July 2000. It was compiled of material recorded by vocalist/bassist Nick Oliveri with drummer Rob Oswald, vocalist/guitarist Brent Malkus, and his ex-Kyuss bandmates Josh Homme, Brant Bjork and John Garcia. Recorded in 1997, the material was shelved for three years due to disinterest from the band to release it and Oliveri's full-time commitment to Queens of the Stone Age.

In 2009, Cocaine Rodeo was re-issued with a bonus disk titled Alive & Wired featuring live material recorded in 2003 and 2004. In 2020, Cocaine Rodeo was re-released by Oliveri's current label Heavy Psych Sounds Records as part of its 20th anniversary.

== Recording and release ==
Nick Oliveri formed Mondo Generator in 1997 under the moniker "Rex Everything", taking the name of the band from a phrase Kyuss bandmate Brant Bjork had spray-painted on the side of Oliveri's amplifier and the Oliveri-penned song of the same name from 1992 album Blues for the Red Sun by Kyuss. Oliveri funded the recording and mixing sessions for Mondo Generator's debut album with the money he had made from the Dwarves' album The Dwarves Are Young and Good Looking. The sessions took place over two days in 1997 at Monkey Studios in California. In addition to the members of Mondo Generator, drummer Rob Oswald and co-lead vocalist/guitarist Brent Malkus, Oliveri invited his former Kyuss bandmates Josh Homme, Brant Bjork and John Garcia, and Kyuss producer Chris Goss to contribute performances to the album. The impromptu reunion was planned by Oliveri, who invited each member separately to the studio without any knowledge of who they were playing with. The tracks "13th Floor", "Simple Exploding Man" and "Cocaine Rodeo" feature Homme, Bjork and Oliveri, while "Simple Exploding Man" features all four original Kyuss members, including Garcia.

The album was shelved after the recording sessions due to the band not wanting to release it and Oliveri's commitment to Queens of the Stone Age. The album was eventually released on 18 July 2000, through Southern Lord Records, with the US and European editions each featured a bonus track. In the time leading up to its release and after, Queens of the Stone Age would perform"13th Floor", renamed to "Tension Head", and "Simple Exploding Man" live. Cocaine Rodeo was later re-issued on Impedance Records in 2009, featuring an additional bonus disk of live material recorded by Oliveri and his then-bandmates Dave Catching, Molly McGuire and Bjork. All the live tracks were recorded during Mondo Generator's show at the Troubadour in Los Angeles on 12 December 2003, with the exception of the Queens of the Stone Age cover "Autopilot", which was recorded at the Reading Festival in 2004. For its 20th anniversary in 2020, the album was re-pressed through Heavy Pscyh Sounds Records.

== Track listing ==
All tracks are written by Mondo Generator, except where noted.

No.	Title	Length
1.	"13th Floor"	3:15
2.	"Shawnette"	3:18
3.	"Uncle Tommy"	1:28
4.	"Miss Mary Gets a Boob Job"	4:14
5.	"Unless I Can Kill"	1:55
6.	"PigMan"	3:01
7.	"Simple Exploding Man" (extended version)	11:31
8.	"I Want You to Die"	1:20
9.	"Dead Insects"	4:05
10.	"Cocaine Rodeo"	2:09
Total length:		36:16

US edition bonus track
No.	Title	Length
11.	"Another Tension Head"	2:10
Total length:		38:26

European edition bonus track
No.	Title	Length
12.	"Simple Exploding Man (Texas)"	4:31
Total length:		40:47

Reissue bonus disk – Alive & Wired
No.	Title	Writer(s)	Length
1.	"Six Shooter" (live)	Josh Homme; Nick Oliveri	1:27
2.	"Here We Come" (live)		1:52
3.	"F.Y. I'm Free" (live)		2:17
4.	"Jr. High Love" (live)		2:08
5.	"Shawnette" (live)		3:26
6.	"So High" (live)		2:37
7.	"Jealous Again" (live)		1:47
8.	"Unless I Can Kill" (live)		1:58
9.	"Allen's Wrench" (live)		3:02
10.	"Open Up and Bleed for Me" (live)		3:25
11.	"Simple Exploding Man" (live)		13:26
12.	"Autopilot" (live)	Homme; Oliveri	3:57
Total length:			41:22

== Personnel ==
Studio personnel

- Rex Everything (Nick Oliveri) – bass (all tracks), lead vocals (tracks 1, 2, 5, 7, 8, 10)
- Burnt Mattress (Brent Malkus) – guitar (tracks 2 – 6, 8, 9), lead vocals (tracks 3, 4, 6, 9, 11)
- Up N. Syder (Rob Oswald) – drums (tracks 2–6, 8, 9)
- Josh Homme – guitar (tracks 1, 7, 10)
- Brant Bjork – drums (tracks 1, 7, 10)
- Valerie Avazza – backing vocals (track 7)
- John Garcia – backing vocals (track 7)
- Chris Goss – backing vocals (track 7)

Alive & Wired personnel

- Nick Oliveri – lead vocals (2-1–2-11)
- Diamond Dave Catching – guitar (tracks 2-1–2-12)
- Nurse Molly McGuire – bass, backing vocals (tracks 2-1–2-12)
- Brant Bjork – drums (2-1–2-12)
- Mark Lanegan – lead vocals (track 2–12)

Additional personnel

- Nick Oliveri – production
- Greg Biribauer – production (tracks 2-1–2-12)
- Steve Feldman – recording, mixing
- Schneebie (Mathias Schneeberger) – remixing (tracks 1, 4–6, 10)
- Phil Easter – mastering
- Carl Whitbread – artwork (Impedance reissue)

== Notes ==
- "13th Floor" was later re-recorded as "Tension Head" for Queens of the Stone Age's Rated R album.
- "Uncle Tommy" and "Unless I Can Kill" were both originally featured on a split EP with The Jack Saints in 1997.
- Acoustic versions of "I Want You to Die" and "Simple Exploding Man" appeared on Oliveri's solo record, Demolition Day.
- "Shawnette" was later titled "Shawnette Jackson" on The Best of Mondo Generator and Live at Bronson releases.
- The end of "Dead Insects" contains a riff from the song "Carry On Wayward Son" by Kansas.
