= Decade: Ten Years of Fierce Panda =

Compilation album
- Released: 1 March 2004
- Label: Fierce Panda Records

Professional ratings
Review scores
Source	Rating
NME	(7/10)

Decade: Ten Years of Fierce Panda (released 1 March 2004) is a compilation album released by Fierce Panda Records. The album celebrates the label's tenth anniversary, and features some of their best-known artists.

== Track listing ==
1. Ash - "Punkboy"
2. Supergrass - "Caught by the Fuzz"
3. The Bluetones - "No. 11"
4. Placebo - "Bruise Pristine"
5. Kenickie - "Come Out 2nite"
6. 3 Colours Red - "This Is My Hollywood"
7. Embrace - "All You Good Good People"
8. Lo-Fidelity Allstars - "Diamonds Are Forever"
9. Idlewild - "Chandelier"
10. Seafood - "Porchlight"
11. Coldplay - "Brothers & Sisters"
12. Hundred Reasons - "Cerebra"
13. Bright Eyes - "Arienette"
14. Easyworld - "Hundredweight"
15. The Music - "Take the Long Road and Walk It"
16. The Polyphonic Spree - "Soldier Girl"
17. Winnebago Deal - "Manhunt"
18. Six by Seven - "Bochum (Light Up My Life)"
19. Death Cab for Cutie - "Tiny Vessels"
20. Keane - "This Is the Last Time"
