= Head for the Door =

Studio album by The Exies
- Released: November 30, 2004
- Recorded: 2004
- Studio: The Bennett House, Franklin; Ocean Way, Nashville, Sound City Studios, Los Angeles, CA,
- Genre: Alternative rock, post-grunge, alternative metal, nu metal
- Length: 41:38
- Label: Virgin
- Producer: Nick Raskulinecz

The Exies chronology
Inertia (2003)	Head for the Door (2004)	A Modern Way of Living with the Truth (2007)

Singles from Head for the Door
- 1. "Ugly" Released: October 19, 2004; 2. "What You Deserve" Released: June 14, 2005; 3. "Hey You" Released: November 8, 2005

Professional ratings
Review scores
Source	Rating
AllMusic	2/5 stars
Rolling Stone	2/5 stars

Head for the Door is the third studio album by American rock band The Exies. It was released on November 30, 2004.

"Ugly" would prove to be the album's first single and found notable airplay upon release. The song's chorus utilizes an easily recognizable power chord structure and was also used as the theme song for WWE Survivor Series 2004.

"Hey You" was included as a cover by WaveGroup Sound in the first two Guitar Hero games (the latter as DLC) and would later appear as a master recording in Guitar Hero Smash Hits.

"Slow Drain" was featured in NFL Street 2.

"What You Deserve" is included in the soundtrack of Juiced.

== Track listing ==
No.	Title	Length
1.	"Slow Drain"	3:35
2.	"Splinter"	3:39
3.	"Ugly"	3:18
4.	"What You Deserve"	3:08
5.	"Hey You"	3:58
6.	"Baptize Me"	3:38
7.	"F.S.O.S."	2:39
8.	"My Opinion"	3:20
9.	"Dear Enemy"	3:55
10.	"Tired of You"	3:59
11.	"Normal"	3:35
12.	"Don't Push the River"	2:54

Japanese Edition
No.	Title	Length
13.	"Unspoken"	3:38
14.	"Like Minded"	2:52

Limited Edition
No.	Title	Length
13.	"Ugly (Acoustic Version)"	3:27

- All songs composed by The Exies, except track 10, which is composed by The Exies and Nick Raskulinecz.

== Personnel ==
Musical

- Scott Stevens – vocals, guitar
- David Walsh – guitar
- Freddy Herrera – bass guitar
- Dennis Wolfe – drums

Technical

- Nick Raskulinecz – producer, engineer
- Matt Serletic – executive producer
- Christopher Wade Damerst – programming, loops
- Dean Serletic – A&R
- Mike Terry – engineer, digital editing
- Travis Huff – engineer
- Bob Ludwig – mastering
- Joe Barresi – mixing
- Chris Lord-Alge – mixing
- Randy Staub – mixing
- Bobby Schneck – guitar technician
- John Nicholson – drum technician
- Andrew Alekel – assistant
- Keith Armstrong – assistant
- Paul Figueroa – assistant
- June Murakawa – assistant
- German Villacorta – assistant
- Liza Lowinger – art coordinator
- Jeff Garner – photography
- Chapman Baehler – photography
- Alastair Thain – cover photo
- P. R. Brown – package design
