= The Exies (album) =

Studio album by The Exies
- Released: March 28, 2000
- Recorded: July 6 – August 18, 1999
- Genre: Alternative rock, post-grunge
- Length: 39:14
- Label: Ultimatum
- Producer: Stephen Haigler

The Exies chronology
| The Exies (2000) | Inertia (2003) |

Professional ratings
Review scores
| Source | Rating |
|---|---|
| AllMusic | 2/5 stars |
| PopMatters | 5/10 stars |

The Exies is the debut studio album by American rock band The Exies. It was released on March 28, 2000. following the album's release, the song "Baby's Got a New Revelation" was featured on the short-lived UPN show Gary & Mike.

== Track listing ==
| No. | Title | Length |
|---|---|---|
| 1. | "Feeling Lo-Fi" | 2:43 |
| 2. | "Baby's Got a New Revelation" | 3:03 |
| 3. | "Bighead" | 3:30 |
| 4. | "Straight Girl of the Universe" | 3:13 |
| 5. | "1970+" | 4:15 |
| 6. | "Western Dream" | 3:46 |
| 7. | "On the Brighter Side" | 2:59 |
| 8. | "Rocket Balloon" | 4:03 |
| 9. | "Ego Tryptophane" | 3:34 |
| 10. | "All the Pretty Ones" | 3:30 |
| 11. | "Numb (Happy?)" | 4:38 |

== Personnel ==
Musical

- Scott Stevens - vocals, guitar
- David Walsh - guitar
- Freddy Herrera - bass guitar
- Thom Sullivan - drums

Technical

- Stephen Haigler - producer, engineer, mixing
- Joe Zook - producer, mixing
- Christopher Wade Damerst - producer, drum programming
- Gavin Lurssen - mastering
- Steve Marcusson - mastering
- Mark Comstock - artwork, art direction
- Chris Skane - art direction
- Lisa Johnson - photography
- Jeff Garner - photography
