= Dog Food (EP) =

EP by Mondo Generator
- Released: May 21, 2010
- Recorded: 2010
- Genre: Hard rock, acoustic rock
- Length: 20:23
- Label: Impedance Records (Australia)

Mondo Generator chronology
Australian Tour EP 2008 (2008)	Dog Food (2010)	Hell Comes to Your Heart (EP) (2011)

Dog Food is an EP by Mondo Generator released on May 21, 2010. It includes a cover of Iggy Pop's song "Dog Food" featuring Dave Grohl, Happy-Tom and Marc Diamond, in addition to two acoustic studio songs and five live tracks from Nick Oliveri's Death Acoustic tour recorded at Main Street Studios in Australia in 2010.

== Track listing ==
No.	Title	Writer(s)	Length
1.	"Dog Food"	Iggy Pop	2:28
2.	"Smashed Apart"	Nick Oliveri	2:49
3.	"This Isn't Love"	Oliveri	2:50
4.	"Green Machine" (live)	Brant Bjork	3:40
5.	"Endless Vacation" (live)	Dee Dee Ramone; Johnny Ramone	1:34
6.	"Bloody Hammer" (live)	Roky Erickson	3:05
7.	"Dungaree High" (live)	Turbonegro	2:58
8.	"Pushed Aside"	Trash Talk	0:59
Total length:			20:23

== Personnel ==
- Nick Oliveri – lead vocals, acoustic guitar, electric guitar
- Michele Madden – vocals (track 1)
- The Fresh Prince Of Darkness – lead guitar (track 1)
- Happy-Tom – bass (track 1)
- Dave Grohl – drums (track 1)

Technical Staff

- Adam Jordan – engineer, mixing
- J. Bradley Cook – producer, recording, mixing (track 1)
