= Marc Diamond =

American guitarist

Marc Diamond is an American lead guitarist best known for his work with seminal hardcore band Dwarves (under the pseudonym The Fresh Prince of Darkness) as well as the Los Angeles hard rock outfit Motochrist. He previously played in the bands Texas Terri Bomb, and Mondo Generator (featuring fellow Dwarves bassist Rex Everything). His work has been featured in both TV and film, and has appeared on myriad recordings by other artists.

== Discography ==
Albums

- Broken Glass, A Fast Mean Game" - Chrysalis Records, 1990
- NY Loose, Year of the Rat - Hollywood Records, 1996
- Motochrist, 666 Pack - RAFR Records, 1999
- Gage, Sore Eyes and a Rusty Heart - Dr. Wu Records, 2000
- Dwarves, Come Clean - Epitaph Records, 2000
- Dwarves, How to Win Friends and Influence People - Reptilian Records, 2001
- Torrance Jackson, My Dream - Dr. Wu Records, 2001
- Motochrist, Greetings from the Bonneville Salt Flats - Heat Slick Records, 2003
- Mondo Generator, A Drug Problem That Never Existed - Ipecac Recordings, 2003
- Dwarves, The Dwarves Must Die - Sympathy for the Record Industry, 2004
- The Holograms, Night of 1000 Ex-Boyfriends Teenacide Records, 2005
- Motochrist, Hollywood High - Dr. Wu Records, 2006
- Faster Pussycat, The Power and the Gloryhole Full Effect Records, 2006
- Mondo Generator, Dead Planet - Mother Tongue, 2006
- Texas Terri Bomb, Your Lips...My Ass! TKO Records, 2004
- Hollywood Roses, Dopesnake - Cleopatra/Deadline Music, 2007
- Dwarves/Blag Dahlia, No Balls Records Germany, 2007
- Candy Now!, MVD Records, 2009
- Motochrist, Corvette Summer - Dr. Wu Records, 2010
- Dwarves, The Dwarves Are Born Again - MVD/Greedy, 2011
- Dwarves, European 10 - NO Balls Records, 2011
- Mondo Generator, Hell Comes to Your Heart EP - No Balls Records, 2011
- Nick Oliveri's Uncontrollable, Leave Me Alone - Schnitzel Records, 2014
- Dwarves, Radio Free Dwarves - Greedy, 2015
- Dwarves, Take Back the Night - Greedy, 2018
- Dwarves, The Dwarves Concept Album - Greedy, 2023

Singles/EPs:

- Blister, "Hey Louie/Automatic" - Snag Free Records, 1995
- The Apes, "Hypnosis" - Low Blow Records, 1996
- NY Loose, "Rip Me Up/Detonator" - Hollywood Records, 1996
- NY Loose/Hole, "Spit/Gold Dust Woman" - The Crow soundtrack, Hollywood Records, 1996
- Dwarves, "Way Out/How It's Done/There She Goes Again" - Recess Records, 2000
- Texas Terri /Marky Ramone, "Dirty Action/Love Hates Me" - Rawk a Hula Records, 2002
- Texas Terri/Antiseen, "Dirty Action/Beat on the Brat" -TKO Records, 2003
- Dwarves, "Salt Lake City/Go!/Kaotica" - Sympathy for the Record Industry, 2004
- Dwarves, "Like You Want/Another Classic/Astroboy" Sympathy for the Record Industry, 2004
- Dwarves/Turbo AC's, "Bleed On/Turbonaut" - No Balls Records, 2005
- Mondo Generator, "I Never Sleep/Here We Come/Allen's Wrench" - Mother Tongue, 2006
- Ayumi Hamasaki, "Talkin' 2 Myself/Decision" - Columbia Japan, 2007
- Dwarves/Royce Cracker, "Speed Demon" - Zodiac Killer Records, 2009
- Dwarves, "Fake ID" - Zodiac Killer Records, 2011
- Dwarves, "We Only Came To Get High" - Riot Style, 2011
- Dwarves, "Stillborn in the USA" - Asian Man Records/Greedy, 2012
