= Hoss Wright =

American drummer

David Wright
- Also known as: "Hoss"
- Origin: Richmond, Virginia, U.S.
- Genres: Alternative rock; alternative metal; hard rock; post-grunge; punk rock
- Occupation: Musician
- Instrument: Drums
- Labels: Eleven Seven, Suburban Noize
- Formerly of: The Exies, Nick Oliveri and the Mondo Generator

David "Hoss" Wright is an American drummer who has played for The Exies, and Nick Oliveri and the Mondo Generator. While part of Mondo Generator, he wrote some songs for the album Dead Planet with Nick Oliveri. His musical career began around the time he was 13 in Richmond, Virginia. He was a member of the local band Black Widow and he was the drummer of the band "JUD" based in Los Angeles. Currently working with Los Angeles based songwriter Richard James Munoz for new album release in 2017.

== Discography ==
The Exies

- A Modern Way of Living with the Truth

Nick Oliveri and the Mondo Generator

- Dead Planet
- Hell Comes To Your Heart
