= Mondo Generator =

American rock band

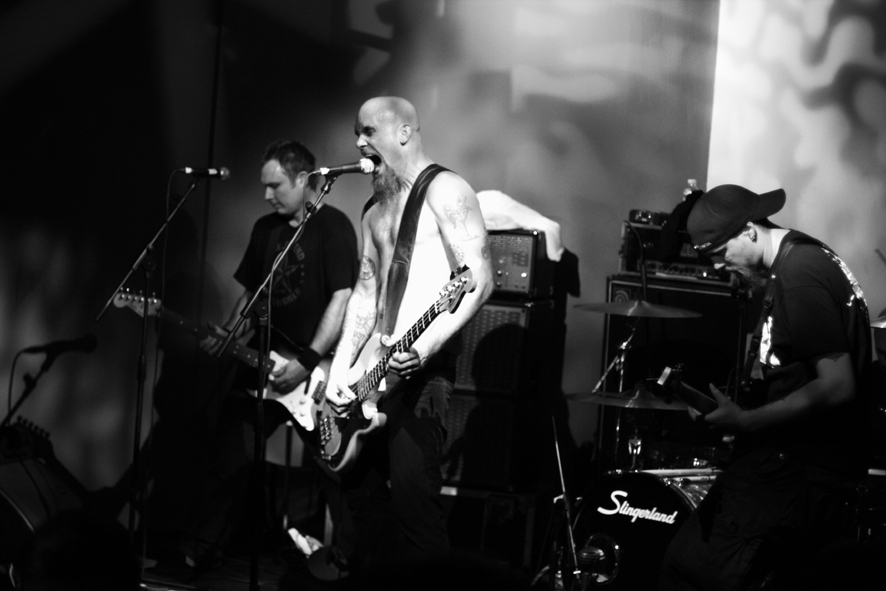
- Mondo Generator performing live in 2006

Background information
- Also known as: Nick Oliveri and the Mondo Generator
- Origin: Van Nuys, California, U.S.
- Genres: Alternative metal; punk rock; stoner rock; hard rock; alternative rock
- Years active: 1997–present
- Labels: Southern Lord; Rekords; Ipecac; Mother Tongue; Suburban Noize; Self Destructo; Heavy Psych Sounds
- Spinoffs: Vista Chino; Stöner; Death Machine II; Death Machine III
- Spinoff of: Kyuss; Dwarves; Queens of the Stone Age; The Desert Sessions
- Members: Nick Oliveri; Mike Pygmie; Michael Amster
- Past members: See below
- Website: mondogenerator.net

Mondo Generator (also known as Nick Oliveri and the Mondo Generator) is an American rock band founded in 1997 by Nick Oliveri. The band has released seven studio albums, four EPs, one live album and one video album.

== History ==
=== Formation and Cocaine Rodeo (1997–2002) ===
Nick Oliveri (under the moniker Rex Everything) formed Mondo Generator in 1997. The name of the band originated when Brant Bjork spray-painted the words on the side of Oliveri's Sunn amplifier. Mondo means "world" in Italian. The Oliveri-penned Kyuss song appearing on the 1992 album Blues for the Red Sun also took its name from this event, and the amplifier itself appears in the artwork for the album. With friends Josh Homme, Brant Bjork, Rob Oswald, and Karl Doyle among others, the band recorded their debut album, Cocaine Rodeo, the same year. The album wouldn't be released until three years later due to Oliveri and Homme being full-time members of Queens of the Stone Age. The album was released by cult-favorite Southern Lord Records in 2000. There was little support of the album by the way of live shows, and the band gained cult status among the most devoted Queens of the Stone Age fans.

=== A Drug Problem That Never Existed (2003) ===
In 2003, the band again emerged with a new album, A Drug Problem That Never Existed. This time, Oliveri hired on more friends for recording duties including Dave Catching, Troy Van Leeuwen, Mark Lanegan, Josh Homme, Brant Bjork, Molly McGuire, and Dwarves frontman Blag Dahlia for co-producing duties. It was released jointly by Mike Patton's label, Ipecac Recordings, and Homme's Rekords Rekords. The live band, which included Oliveri, Catching, Bjork, and McGuire, went on a three-month tour of North America and Europe to support the album. That summer, the band also played on the second stage of the Lollapalooza festival. Oliveri would do an afternoon set with Mondo Generator, then at night he would play with Queens of the Stone Age, who were appearing on the main stage.

=== Demolition Day (2004–2005) ===
In early 2004, after Oliveri was fired from Queens of the Stone Age by Homme, he announced that Mondo Generator would become his full-time project. He recorded an acoustic record, Demolition Day, and toured Europe with Bjork and Mark Lanegan Band. He then recorded an EP with Catching, McGuire, and Alfredo Hernández. On July 21, 2004, during the summer tour to promote the disc, Oliveri physically assaulted a sound crew member of the South German night club Canapé (Trossingen) after complaining about his sound through a few songs during the band's set. The other members of the band were furious and left Oliveri behind and returned to the United States.

In 2005, Oliveri once again toured Europe frequently, opening for such bands as Motörhead, and playing alongside and on stage as a member of Dwarves. Oliveri also recruited UK band Winnebago Deal's Ben Perrier and Ben Thomas to join Mondo Generator on tour. They were frequently dubbed "Winnebago Generator" by fans and themselves. The three-piece entered Dave Grohl's Studio 606 in Los Angeles in December 2005 to begin work on the next Mondo Generator album. Oliveri also hired several friends from his hometown to record parts of the record, which was co-produced by Nick Raskulinecz and Oliveri.

=== Dead Planet (2006–2007) ===
In July 2006, it was reported that Perrier and Thomas had exited the band under unknown circumstances. Oliveri later renamed his band to Nick Oliveri and the Mondo Generator and signed to Mother Tongue Records, who released the album, Dead Planet in the UK and Europe in September 2006. Touring members of the band included Ian Taylor on guitar, and Hoss Wright, former drummer who recently rejoined the band after leaving in early 2007 to join The Exies.

On March 21, 2007, they were added to Ozzfest 2007 as one of the non-rotating acts on the Second Stage. Their invite and subsequent tour with Ozzfest was thought by many to be a direct slap at Homme, who rejected offers for Queens of the Stone Age to tour in the 2007 lineup. The rejection sparked a war of words between Sharon Osbourne and Homme, and shortly after, Mondo Generator accepted QOTSA's slot. Ozzfest began on July 12, and on July 26, Oliveri released a statement announcing that the band had left the tour due to things "out of [his] control". It was announced on July 28 that their spot would be filled by DevilDriver. After which Mondo Generator went on a US tour supporting Turbonegro.

Suburban Noize Records released the album under the shortened title Dead Planet in the US on July 17, 2007. On September 25, 2007, courtesy of Suburban Noize Records, Mondo Generator was the featured band on Poison Tree Records Compilation called Road to Nowhere.

=== Hell Comes to Your Heart (2008–2014) ===
In October 2008, after a long two-month break, Nick and drummer David "Hoss" Wright began the recording of a new Mondo Generator record with longtime friend, J. Bradley Cook as engineer and co-producer. In a July 2009 Myspace blog, Oliveri announced that the next Mondo Generator record would be titled Shooter's Bible but removed the post a day later. In 2010, Oliveri appeared as a singer on the track "Chains and Shackles" from guitarist Slash's self-titled solo album. The track was released as a bonus track on the Australian edition of the album. On April 6, 2010, it was announced that Mondo Generator's fourth full-length album would be entitled Time to Destroy with a release date slated for July/August. The first single, "Dog Food", was released on May 21, 2010, and featured Dave Grohl on drums, bassist Happy Tom, and guitarist Marc Diamond.

In March 2011, Oliveri stated that the band had recently recorded yet another album at his former bandmate Josh Homme's studio: "I just did a new record called Hell Comes to Your Heart. So far, I'm talking to a couple of small labels to put it out, and I might just put it out myself with some distribution. So it's one of those things I'm trying to figure out how I'm going to get it out there. It will be out soon. [...] It's definitely the best one yet, I really feel good about it."

In April 2012, Oliveri announced in an interview and on his Facebook page, that his forthcoming release, Hell Comes to Your Heart, had recently been completed. Notable contributors to the album are C. J. Ramone, Josh Homme, Blag Dahlia, and John Garcia. The album was released on iTunes and cdbaby.com for download on May 22, 2012. The physical album editions were released by Mondo Media and Cobraside Distribution. The track "The Last Train" features Homme on lead guitar and Garcia on vocals. This track was recorded shortly before Homme filed a lawsuit against Garcia and Kyuss Lives! In September 2013, it was announced that Oliveri and Hoss would join the new touring lineup of Moistboyz.

In 2014, during a break from Mondo Generator, Oliveri released a solo album under the name Nick Oliveri's Uncontrollable, entitled Leave Me Alone, on which he sang, played all instruments and featured guest guitar solos on each track. For live shows he recruited Mondo Generator and You Know Who lead guitarist Mike Pygmie and drummer Jeff Bowman from Mighty Jack and Unsound, a desert area punk band who played many shows with Kyuss in the early 1990s. Stephen Haas from the Moistboyz also played guitar for a brief time. Nick Oliveri's Uncontrollable played several shows in the desert, Los Angeles and Bay areas, most notably opening for Queens of the Stone Age at the Los Angeles Forum on Halloween night. Oliveri later joined Queens of the Stone Age on stage that night to sing several songs from the albums Rated R and Songs for the Deaf.

=== Fuck It, Shooters Bible and We Stand Against You (2015–present) ===
In 2015, Mondo Generator went through a lineup change, with Ian Taylor and Hoss Wright departing, and Jeff Bowman joining full-time on drums. The power trio of Oliveri, Pygmie and Bowman that played as Nick Oliveri's Uncontrollable reformed as Mondo Generator. In October, the band embarked on a month-long US tour, with supporting act Peter Pan Speed Rock from the Netherlands.

In November, just a week after the terrorist attacks in Paris, including the Bataclan where fellow desert rockers Eagles of Death Metal were playing, Mondo Generator kicked off a European tour at Speed Fest in Eindhoven, Netherlands, to a crowd of more than 5,000. The tour ran through 10 countries and concluded in Paris in mid-December. In 2016, the compilation album The Best of Mondo Generator was released. In 2018, drummer Bowman departed the band and was replaced by Michael Amster.

In February 2020, Mondo Generator released their albums in eight years, Fuck It and Shooters Bible, the latter originally recorded in 2010. The band released their first live album, Live at Bronson, in 2021. The album featured their performance at the Bronson club in Ravenna, Italy on 13 February, 2020 before their tour was cancelled due to the COVID-19 pandemic. Mondo Generator released their seventh studio album, We Stand Against You, in October 2023.

== Band members ==
=== Current lineup ===
- Nick Oliveri – bass (1997–2003; 2004–present), guitar (2003–2004), lead vocals (1997–present)
- Mike Pygmie – guitar (2012–present)
- Michael Amster – drums (2018–present)

=== Former members ===
Guitarists

- Ian Taylor (2007–2015)
- Simon "Spud" Beggs (2006–2007)
- Ben Perrier (2004–2006)
- Marc Diamond (2004–2005)
- Dave Catching (2003–2004)
- Troy Van Leeuwen (2003)
- Josh Homme (1997–2002)
- Derek Myers (1997–1998)
- Brent Malkus (a.k.a. Burnt Mattress) (1997)

Bassists

- Molly McGuire (2003–2004)

Drummers

- Jeff Bowman (2015–2018)
- Hoss Wright (2006;2007–2015)
- Giampaolo Farnedi (2007)
- Ernie Longoria (2006–2007)
- Ben Thomas (2004–2006)
- Josh Lamar (2004)
- Alfredo Hernández (2004)
- Dave Grohl (2003–2004)
- Joey Castillo (2003)
- Brant Bjork (1997–2003)
- Rob Oswald (a.k.a. Up N. Syder) (1997)

== Discography ==
=== Studio albums ===
- Cocaine Rodeo (2000)
- A Drug Problem That Never Existed (2003)
- Dead Planet (2006)
- Hell Comes to Your Heart (2012)
- Fuck It (2020)
- Shooters Bible (2020)
- We Stand Against You (2023)

=== Live albums ===
- Live at Bronson (2021)

=== EPs ===
- III the EP (2004)
- Australian Tour EP 2008 (2008)
- Dog Food (2010)
- Hell Comes to Your Heart (2011)

=== Compilations ===
- The Best of Mondo Generator (2016)

=== Video albums ===
- Use Once and Destroy Me
