= Demolition Day =

Studio album by Nick Oliveri
- Released: November 22, 2004
- Recorded: 2003–2004
- Genre: Acoustic rock, stoner rock
- Label: Tornado
- Producer: Nick Oliveri

Nick Oliveri chronology
Demolition Day (2004)	Death Acoustic (2009)

Professional ratings
Review scores
Source	Rating
AllMusic	4.0/5 stars

Demolition Day is former Queens of the Stone Age and Kyuss bassist/vocalist Nick Oliveri's first solo acoustic album. The album was recorded in 2003 and 2004 at Dave Grohl's Studio 606. The album features Oliveri on bass, vocals, guitars and percussion, as well as horns and guitars from other various artists. It was released in 2004 on vinyl only, but a split CD featuring six tracks from the album and four tracks from Mondo Generator was also released.

== Track listing ==
=== Split CD ===
Nick Oliveri

1. All I've Got (Nick Oliveri)
2. I Want You to Die (Nick Oliveri)
3. Autopilot (Nick Oliveri/Josh Homme)
4. Simple Exploding Man (Nick Oliveri)
5. One More Time in Hell (Nick Oliveri)
6. Paper Thin (Nick Oliveri)

Mondo Generator

1. All the Way Down (Nick Oliveri)
2. Bloody Hammer (Roky Erickson)
3. There She Goes Again (Nick Oliveri)
4. Sleep the Lie Away (Nick Oliveri/Dave Catching)

=== Vinyl ===
1. Intro
2. All I've Got
3. I Want You To Die
4. Demolition Day
5. Chiefs
6. Autopilot
7. Simple Exploding Man
8. One More Time In Hell
9. Four Corners
10. Tornadoes
11. So High So Low
12. Ode To Clarissa
13. Wake Up Screaming
14. Detroit
15. Paper Thin

== Trivia ==
- "I Want You to Die" is an acoustic version of the song from Mondo Generator's album Cocaine Rodeo.
- "Autopilot" is an acoustic version of Queens of the Stone Age's Rated R song and features Mark Lanegan on backing vocals.
- "Simple Exploding Man" is an acoustic version of the song from Mondo Generator's Cocaine Rodeo.
- "Four Corners" is from Mondo Generator's previous album A Drug Problem That Never Existed and features Mark Lanegan on vocals.
- "Paper Thin" was rerecorded for Mondo Generator's next album Dead Planet: SonicSlowMotionTrails.
- "Ode To Clarissa" is a new recording from a Queens of the Stone Age B-Side circa Rated R.
- "So High, So Low" is a new recording from Mondo Generator's album A Drug Problem That Never Existed and was rerecorded for Dead Planet: SonicSlowMotionTrails.
- "All I've Got" was rerecorded for Mondo Generator's next album Dead Planet: SonicSlowMotionTrails and was retitled "Take Me Away" .
- CD Tracks 7–10 is actually all four tracks from III the EP.
