= Australian Tour EP 2008 =

EP by Mondo Generator
- Released: July 21, 2008
- Genre: Hard rock, punk rock
- Length: 30:49
- Label: Impedance Records (Australia)

Mondo Generator chronology
Dead Planet (2007)	Australian Tour EP 2008 (2008)	Dog Food (2010)

Australian Tour EP 2008 is an EP by Mondo Generator containing a mix of studio, acoustic, and live material. It was released to coincide with their first Australian tour in August 2008. The track "Lie Detector" is featured on the band's 2007 album Dead Planet. "Eccentric Man" was recorded at the Reading Festival in 2004, while "Unless I Can Kill" and "Simple Exploding Man" were recorded at the Troubadour in Los Angeles in December 2003.

== Track listing ==
No.	Title	Length
1.	"Lie Detector"	4:20
2.	"You Can't Put Your Arms Around a Memory" (Johnny Thunders cover)	3:00
3.	"Autopilot" (acoustic)	3:42
4.	"Eccentric Man" (live)	4:23
5.	"Unless I Can Kill" (live)	1:58
6.	"Simple Exploding Man" (live)	13:26
Total length:		30:49

== Personnel ==
- Lie Detector
- Nick Oliveri – Vocals, Guitar, Bass
- Ben Thomas – Drums (not credited)
- Ben Perrier – Guitar (not credited)
- Mark Diamond – Lead Guitar
- Hoss is wrongly credited with drums
- You Cant Put Your Arms Around a Memory
- Nick Oliveri – Vocals, Guitar
- Autopilot
- Mark Lanegan – Vocals
- Nick Oliveri – Guitar, background Vocals
- Curly Jobson – Guitar
- Eccentric Man
- Nick Oliveri – Vocals, Bass
- Mark Diamond – Guitar
- Josh Lamar – Drums

Recorded Live at Reading Festival 2004

- Unless I Can Kill
- Nick Oliveri – Vocals
- Dave Catching – Guitar
- Molly McGuire – Bass
- Brant Bjork – Drums

Recorded Live at Troubadour, Los Angeles 2003

- Simple Exploding Man
- Nick Oliveri – Vocals
- Dave Catching – Guitar
- Molly McGuire – Bass
- Brant Bjork – Drums

Recorded Live at Troubadour, Los Angeles 2003
