= Scott Stevens (musician) =

American rock musician

- Born: Menomonee Falls, Wisconsin, U.S.
- Genres: Rock
- Years active: 1997–present
- Formerly of: The Exies

Scott Stevens is an American-born songwriter, producer, singer and instrumentalist. In April 2015, he signed an exclusive publishing deal with Lava Music Publishing, a venture with Kobalt Publishing. He co-wrote eight songs on the 2015 Halestorm album, Into the Wild Life, which debuted at number 5 on the Billboard 200. Stevens also co-wrote, produced and mixed two songs for the 2015 Shinedown album Threat to Survival.

== Early life ==
Stevens was born in Menomonee Falls, Wisconsin. His mother was his first musical influence and started him off playing the trumpet at an early age. He moved on to the French horn, brass and baritone and played in the jazz band all through junior high and high school. While he has a deep appreciation for a variety of artists and musical genres – from Elton John, Carly Simon and James Taylor to AC/DC, Kiss, Nirvana and Radiohead – Stevens says the band that had the biggest impact on his career was The Beatles. In fact, it was from a John Lennon biography that the name of his band, The Exies (short for The Existentialists), was born.

== Career ==
=== The Exies (1997–2010) ===
Stevens was a singer and guitarist, living in Los Angeles, when he formed The Exies in 1997 with bassist Freddy Herrera and drummer Thom Sullivan. He said like most bands playing in LA, the dream was to sign a record deal and go on tour. In 2000, dream became reality when the band released their self-titled debut album on Ultimatum Records and began touring, catching the attention of record producer, Matt Serletic, who bought the band's contract from their current label.

In January 2003, after signing with Virgin Records, The Exies released their second and most successful album, Inertia, which rose to number 115 on the Billboard 200. Rolling Stone proclaimed The Exies the band to watch that year. In 2004, The Exies headed back into the studio with Nick Raskulinecz to produce their third album, Head for the Door, which was released in December of that year. The band promoted the album by opening for Velvet Revolver on their first arena tour, and also supported Mötley Crüe on their Carnival of Sins tour.

Upon their return from touring, Virgin decided to release The Exies from their contract. In May 2006, the band announced that it would return to the studio with producer James Michael to work on its fourth album, A Modern Way of Living with the Truth, which was released a year later by Eleven Seven Music. Songs from that album were released on MySpace and iTunes, among them "God We Look Good (Going Down in Flames)," along with acoustic versions of "My Goddess," "Ugly," "Genius," and "Tired of You."

On January 27, 2023, The Exies released their first song in fifteen years entitled, "Spirits High."

=== Singer into songwriter (2010–present) ===
In 2010, Stevens left The Exies to pursue his passion for songwriting and producing. He began writing for other artists during his year-long contract with Warner/Chapell Publishing, and then went on to write and produce with Bug Music, eventually purchased by BMG. Steven's first cut with Bug was a song he wrote for Theory Of A Deadman, titled "Head Above Water," from The Transformers: Dark of the Moon soundtrack. He also wrote, "Bad Seed Rising," the title credit song in Melissa McCarthy's movie, Spy. He wrote, produced, and mixed songs for several successful albums and hit singles in the early and mid 2010's.

== Songwriting and production credits ==
- Halestorm record – eight songs – "Apocalyptic," first single; "Amen" climbing at number 5 on AR charts.
- Shinedown record "Threat to Survival" – two songs co-written, co-mixed and produced, "How Did You Love" and "Dangerous" – released September 2015
- Baptized record – Chris Daughtry – "Undefeated"
- Nothing More number 1 album single – "This is the Time (Ballast)"
- James Durbin record, American Idol
- Connect record – three songs
- Atlantic – "Bad Seed Rising"
- Of Mice & Men – "Never Giving Up" single
- We Came as Romans – second single
- Highly Suspect – second single
