= Inertia (The Exies album) =

Studio album by The Exies
- Released: January 7, 2003
- Genre: Post-grunge; nu metal
- Length: 35:10
- Label: Virgin
- Producer: Matt Serletic

The Exies chronology
The Exies (2000)	Inertia (2003)	Head for the Door (2004)

Singles from Inertia
- 1. "My Goddess" Released: 2002; 2. "Kickout" Released: April 22, 2003

Professional ratings
Review scores
Source	Rating
Allmusic	3/5 stars
Rolling Stone	3/5 stars

Inertia is the second studio album by American rock band The Exies, released on January 7, 2003. The video to the first single "My Goddess" was directed by hip hop video director Diane Martel. The concept of the video revolved around the band playing in front of oncoming traffic- some of which were doing speeds as high as 70 miles an hour. "My Goddess" was filmed on Highway 2 in Los Angeles County in the fall of 2002.

It is their most successful album, reaching #115 on the Billboard 200. Inertia and their next studio album Head for the Door have sold over a combined 400,000 units.

== Track listing ==
No.	Title	Length
1.	"My Goddess"	2:49
2.	"Without"	3:30
3.	"Can't Relate"	3:05
4.	"Kickout"	3:21
5.	"No Secrets"	2:48
6.	"Inertia"	3:26
7.	"Creeper Kamikaze"	3:21
8.	"Calm & Collapsed"	3:00
9.	"Lo-Fi"	3:03
10.	"Irreversible"	3:03
11.	"Genius"	3:46

Japanese Edition
No.	Title	Length
12.	"Supernatural"	3:03
13.	"Cut Me Free"	3:30

- The enhanced version of the CD also features a video of "My Goddess", a multimedia track displayed as an additional track by some software. The duration of this track is 2:49.
- The song "Without" can be heard on the video game MVP Baseball 2003.

== Personnel ==
Musical

- Scott Stevens - vocals, guitar
- David Walsh - vocals, guitar
- Freddy Herrera - bass guitar
- Dennis Wolfe - drums, percussion
- Matt Serletic - keyboards, background vocals, string arrangements, orchestration
- Noel Golden - background vocals
- Mike Fasano - percussion
- Bruce Dukov - concertmaster

Technical

- Matt Serletic - producer
- Noel Golden - engineer, string engineer
- Jo Ann Thrailkill - executive producer
- Dean Serletic - A&R
- Lynn Oliver - A&R
- Christopher Wade Damerst - programming
- David Thoener - mixing
- Stewart Whitmore - digital editing
- Stephen Marcussen - mastering
- Phil Roland - pro-tools
- Craig Poole - guitar technician
- Jay Goin - assistant
- Sam Story - assistant
- Tosh Kasai - assistant
- Tony Green - assistant
- P.R. Brown - design
- William Hames - photography
- Jeff Garner - photography
- Danny Clinch - photography
- Keith Carter - photography
