= Svetlanas =

Russian hardcore punk band

Svetlanas are an Italian thrashcore and punk rock band formed in Milan, Italy. Its current lineup consists of Olga Svetlanas on lead vocals, Ricky on guitar, Steve on bass, and Diste, Olga's husband, on drums. Bassist Nick Oliveri frequently appears on the band's releases.

== History ==
Svetlanas originated in Russia in 2009. Their self-titled debut album was released a year later in 2010. The lineup has changed since the formation of the band but has now remained constant, as of January 2018.

== Band members ==
- Olga Svetlanas – vocals
- Ricky – lead guitar
- Steve Svetlanas – bass
- Diste Svetlanas – drums

Frequent collaborators

- Nick Oliveri – bass, vocals

== Discography ==
=== Albums ===
- Svetlanas (2010)
- Tales from the Alpha Brigade (2013)
- Naked Horse Rider (2015)
- This Is Moscow Not L.A. (2017)
- Disco Sucks (2020)

=== Extended plays ===
- KGB Session (2009)
- East Meets West (2015)
- Putin on da Hitz (2017)
- The Alien's Blues (2023)

=== Singles ===
- "Lose Control" (2017)
