= A Drug Problem That Never Existed =

Studio album by Mondo Generator
- Released: July 1, 2003
- Genre: Alternative metal, stoner rock
- Length: 35:41
- Label: Rekords; Ipecac (IPC41)
- Producer: Nick Oliveri; Blag Dahlia; Brad Cook

Mondo Generator chronology
Cocaine Rodeo (2000)	A Drug Problem That Never Existed (2003)	III the EP (2004)

Professional ratings
Aggregate scores
Source	Rating
Metacritic	70/100
Review scores
Source	Rating
AllMusic	4.5/5 stars

A Drug Problem That Never Existed is the second studio album by American rock band Mondo Generator. It takes its name from a line in The Frogs' "I've Got Drugs (Out of the Mist)", from their album It's Only Right and Natural. Much of the material was inspired by mixed emotions brought about by the divorce of singer Nick Oliveri and also his substance abuses and the death of his father.

The tracks "Jr. High Love" and "Day I Die" were previously recorded by Oliveri and others at The Desert Sessions, "Jr. High Love" for Volumes 3 & 4 and "Day I Die" for Volumes 5 & 6 under the name "I'm Dead". "Girl's Like Christ" is a reworking of a Dwarves song "There She Goes Again" written by Blag Dahlia and Nick Oliveri during his time with the band.

== Track listing ==
All tracks are written by Nick Oliveri, except where noted

No.	Title	Writer(s)	Length
1.	"Meth, I Hear You Callin'"	Brad Cook	1:13
2.	"Here We Come"		1:40
3.	"So High, So Low"		2:35
4.	"Do the Headright"	Oliveri, Josh Homme	2:34
5.	"Open Up and Bleed for Me"		3:18
6.	"All I Can Do"		2:43
7.	"F.Y. I'm Free"	Oliveri, Blag Dahlia	2:12
8.	"Detroit"		3:00
9.	"Me and You"	Oliveri, Homme	2:12
10.	"Like You Want"	Dahlia	2:07
11.	"Girl's Like Christ"	Oliveri, Dahlia	1:39
12.	"Day I Die"		2:56
13.	"Jr. High Love"		2:00
14.	"Four Corners"	Oliveri, Deborah Viereck	5:23

=== Notes ===
- Several editions contain an advert for future releases of Rekords Rekords as a hidden track.

== Credits ==
=== Band members ===
- Nick Oliveri
- Brant Bjork
- Molly McGuire
- Dave Catching

=== Additional musicians ===
- Rex Everything
- Pierre Pressure
- Mark Lanegan
- Josh Homme
- Troy Van Leeuwen
- Josh Freese
- Ashlee S.
- Marc Diamond
- Sean D.
- Blag Jesus
- Alain Johannes
- Carlo Von Sexron

=== Additional credits ===
Produced by Nick Oliveri, Brad Cook, & Blag Dahlia, except "Detroit" & "Day I Die" produced by Nick Oliveri.

Engineered by: Nick Raskulinecz @ Grand Master Studios, Greedy Bros. @ Castle Prod. Studios, Troy Van Leeuwen @ CGI Australia, Alain Johannes @ II A.D. Studios

Mastered by Alain Johannes at II A.D. Studios.

All Tracks Mixed by Brad Cook, except "Detroit" mixed by Alain Johannes & "Day I Die" by Nick Raskulinecz.

All songs published by Nick Oliveri/Natural Light Music BMI (Tracks 2, 3, 5, 6, 8, 12, 13), Brad Cook/Electro Vox Music ASCAP (1), Blag Dahlia/Six Point Prime BMI (10), Nick Oliveri & Josh Homme/Board Stiff Music BMI (4, 9), Nick Oliveri & Blag Dahlia (7, 11), and Nick Oliveri & Deborah Viereck (14).
