= Dead Planet =

2006 studio album by Mondo Generator

Dead Planet: SonicSlowMotionTrails

Studio album by Nick Oliveri and the Mondo Generator
- Released: September 4, 2006
- Length: 42:16
- Label: Mother Tongue (UK/Europe); Impedance (Australia)
- Producer: Nick Oliveri; Nick Raskulinecz; Mathias Schneeberger

Dead Planet

Studio album by Mondo Generator
- Released: July 17, 2007
- Recorded: 2005–2006
- Genre: Punk rock, stoner rock
- Length: 52:30
- Label: Suburban Noize (USA)
- Producer: Nick Oliveri; Nick Raskulinecz; Mathias Schneeberger

Mondo Generator chronology
III the EP (2004)	Dead Planet (2007)	Australian Tour EP 2008 (2008)

Alternative cover
- Heavy Psych Sounds reissue

Professional ratings
Review scores
Source	Rating
AllMusic	4.5/5 stars
Manchester Evening News	4/5 stars
Type 3 Media	8.5/10

Dead Planet is the third studio album by former Queens of the Stone Age and Kyuss bassist/vocalist Nick Oliveri and his band, Mondo Generator. The album was recorded in late 2005 and early 2006 at Dave Grohl's Studio 606 and at Donner & Blitzen studios. The album features Oliveri on bass, vocals, guitars and drums, Hoss Wright on drums, and Ben Perrier, Ben Thomas and Marc Diamond among others.

The album was originally released on the UK label Mother Tongue Records and Impedance Records of Australia in 2006, under the name Dead Planet: SonicSlowMotionTrails. Suburban Noize Records released the album on July 17, 2007 in the United States under the title Dead Planet with a different track list order, plus the remaining tracks from III The EP attached at the end.

In 2020, Dead Planet was reissued as a repress by Oliveri's current label Heavy Psych Sounds Records, featuring new cover art of Oliveri and a similar track listing to the original release.

== Track listings ==
Dead Planet: SonicSlowMotionTrails
No.	Title	Length
1.	"Like a Bomb"	4:13
2.	"All the Way Down"	2:56
3.	"SonicSlowMotionTrails"	3:19
4.	"Basket Case"	1:35
5.	"Lie Detector"	4:20
6.	"So High"	2:24
7.	"Life of Sin"	2:24
8.	"Mental Hell"	2:16
9.	"She Only Owns You"	2:35
10.	"Take Me Away"	4:48
11.	"I Never Sleep"	2:08
12.	"All Systems Go"	1:26
13.	"Paper Thin"	5:15
14.	"Sam Hall"	2:27
Total length:		42:16

Dead Planet
No.	Title	Length
1.	"Basket Case"	1:35
2.	"I Never Sleep"	2:06
3.	"All the Way Down"	2:54
4.	"She Only Owns You"	2:32
5.	"Lie Detector"	4:18
6.	"Mental Hell"	2:14
7.	"All Systems Go"	1:23
8.	"Like a Bomb"	4:04
9.	"So High"	2:23
10.	"S.S.M.T."	3:13
11.	"Take Me Away"	4:42
12.	"Life of Sin"	2:22
13.	"Paper Thin"	5:17
14.	"Sam Hall"	2:25
15.	"There She Goes Again"	1:22
16.	"Bloody Hammer"	4:47
17.	"Sleep the Lie Away"	4:54
Total length:		52:30

Dead Planet (repress)
No.	Title	Length
1.	"Like a Bomb"	4:14
2.	"All the Way Down"	2:55
3.	"Sonic Slow Motion Trails"	3:18
4.	"Basket Case"	1:35
5.	"Lie Detector"	4:20
6.	"So High"	2:24
7.	"Life of Sin"	2:24
8.	"Mental Hell"	2:26
9.	"There She Goes Again"	1:25
10.	"She Only Owns You"	2:35
11.	"Take Me Away"	4:44
12.	"I Never Sleep"	2:08
13.	"All Systems Go"	1:26
14.	"Paper Thin"	5:23

== Notes ==
- "All the Way Down", "There She Goes Again", "Bloody Hammer" and "Sleep the Lie Away" are all from Mondo Generator's previous EP III the EP.
- "So High" is a new recording of "So High, So Low" from Mondo Generator's previous album A Drug Problem That Never Existed.
- "Mental Hell" is a cover of a Ramones song from their album Animal Boy.
- "All the Way Down" was originally recorded by one of Oliveri's old bands, River City Rapists.
- Track 13 is a new recording of "Paper Thin" from Nick Oliveri's solo acoustic album Demolition Day.
- "Bloody Hammer" is a Roky Erickson cover.
- "SonicSlowMotionTrails" was abbreviated to "S.S.M.T." on the Dead Planet rerelease.

== Personnel ==
Mondo Generator

- Nick Oliveri – bass, lead vocals
- Ian Flannon Taylor – guitar, backing vocals
- Simon "Spudd" Beggs – guitar
- Ernie Longoria – drums

Additional musicians

- Ben Perrier
- Ben Thomas
- Marc Diamond
- Blag Dahlia
- Mathias Schneeberger
- Harley Spider
- Dave Catching
- Molly Mcguire
- Hoss Wright
- Alfredo Hernandez

Production

- Nick Raskulinecz
