= Winnebago Deal =

British rock band

- Origin: Oxford, England
- Genres: Hard rock, stoner rock, punk rock
- Years active: 1999–present
- Labels: Fierce Panda, Double Dragon
- Members: Ben Perrier; Ben Thomas

Winnebago Deal are a British rock band from Oxford. They formed in the late 1990s at Bartholomew School in Eynsham, with Ben Perrier (vocals, guitar) and Ben Thomas (drums). Perrier and Thomas decided to perform as a duo after ejecting some early members. Their sound has been compared to Queens of the Stone Age and the bands who recorded for Sub Pop Records. Winnebago Deal generated strong support from many appearances at Oxford's Zodiac club, eventually supporting Fugazi at London's Forum. Their first release was the EP Plata O Plomo in 2003. They were nominated as Best British Newcomer at that year's Kerrang! awards.

The band then signed with Double Dragon Music, and recorded their debut album Dead Gone with producer Jack Endino. The album was released in September 2004 and was positively reviewed by Drowned in Sound. During this period, Perrier and Thomas toured with the band Mondo Generator (headed by Nick Oliveri), while also opening for Mondo Generator as Winnebago Deal. Perrier and Thomas recorded some tracks for the Mondo Generator album Dead Planet but then left the project.

The second Winnebago Deal album, Flight of the Raven, was released in 2006 with Endino again producing. This album was also reviewed positively by Drowned in Sound. Their third album, Career Suicide, was released in 2010. In a review of the album, Rock Sound called Winnebago Deal "A ridiculously overlooked and consistently great band".

== Discography ==
=== Albums ===
- Dead Gone (27 September 2004)
- Flight of the Raven (10 July 2006)
- Career Suicide (22 November 2010)

=== EPs ===
- Plata O Plomo (24 March 2003)
- George Dickel (5 April 2004)
- Bail Out (19 April 2014)

=== Singles ===
- "Manhunt" (11 August 2003)
- "Takin' Care of Business" (split 7-inch with Nebula, 8 December 2003)
- "Cobra" (13 September 2004) #85 U.K.
- "Did it, Done It, Doing It Again" (25 April 2005)
- "Spider Bite" (17 July 2006)
- "Reeper" (13 November 2006)

=== Compilations ===
- Decade: 10 Years of Fierce Panda (1 March 2004)
- Road To Nowhere (25 September 2007) Poison Tree Records
