= Leave Me Alone (Nick Oliveri album) =

Studio album by Nick Oliveri's Uncontrollable
- Released: October 27, 2014
- Recorded: 2013
- Studio: Thunder Underground Studios, Palm Springs, California
- Genre: Alternative metal
- Length: 26:27
- Label: Schnitzel; Heavy Psych Sounds (2023 reissue)
- Producer: Nick Oliveri

Nick Oliveri chronology
Death Acoustic (2009)	Leave Me Alone (2014)	N.O. Hits at All (2017)

Singles from Leave Me Alone
- 1. "Human Cannonball Explodes" Released: June 2, 2014

Professional ratings
Review scores
Source	Rating
AllMusic	3/5 stars
Blabbermouth.net	7.5/10
Classic Rock	3/5 stars
The Line of Best Fit	4.5/10
Mystic Sons	5/10

Leave Me Alone is the debut album of Nick Oliveri's Uncontrollable, a solo project created by Nick Oliveri. It was released in 2014 on Schnitzel Records, and was reissued on October 13, 2023, by Heavy Psych Sounds Records.

Leave Me Alone was recorded in 2013 at Thunder Underground Studios in Palm Springs, California by Harper Hug and Trevor Whatever. Oliveri performed most of the instruments and wrote all songs on the album. He also recruited guest musicians including Blag Dahlia, Phil Campbell and Bruno Fevery. The album is dedicated to deceased Eyehategod drummer Joey LaCaze.

== Track listing ==
Leave Me Alone track listing
No.	Title	Guest musicians	Length
1.	"Human Cannonball Explodes"	Dean Ween	3:04
2.	"Keep Me in the Loop"	Stephen Haas	2:52
3.	"Luv Is Fiction"	Lightnin' Woodcock, Marc Diamond	2:57
4.	"Come and You're Gone"	Diamond, Blag Dahlia	2:48
5.	"The Robot Man"	Phil Campbell	4:26
6.	"Get Lost (With Me)"	Rex Everything	3:13
7.	"Leave Me Alone" (instrumental)		1:42
8.	"The Void"	Bruno Fevery	2:40
9.	"Death Leads the Way"	Mike Pygmie	4:45
Total length:			26:27

== Credits ==
- Nick Oliveri – lead vocals, guitar, acoustic guitar on "Leave Me Alone", bass guitar & drums

Additional musicians

- Dean Ween – lead guitar on "Human Cannonball Explodes"
- Stephen Haas – lead guitar on "Keep Me in the Loop"
- Lightnin' Woodcock – lead guitar on "Luv Is Fiction"
- Marc Diamond – lead guitar on "Luv Is Fiction" & "Come and You're Gone"
- Blag Dahlia – chorus vocals on "Come and You're Gone"
- Phil Campbell – lead guitar on "The Robot Man"
- "Rex Everything" – lead guitar on "Get Lost (With Me)"
- Bruno Fevery – lead guitar on "The Void"
- Mike Pygmie – lead guitar on "Death Leads The Way"

Additional personnel

- Harper Hug & Trevor Whatever – recording
- Mathias Schneeberger – mastering
- Nere Neska – artwork

Additional credits

All songs written by Nick Oliveri & published by Natural Light Music.

Credits taken from liner notes.
