= A Modern Way of Living with the Truth =

Studio album by The Exies
- Released: May 15, 2007
- Genres: Alternative rock, alternative metal, hard rock, post-grunge
- Length: 45:50
- Label: Eleven Seven
- Producer: James Michael

The Exies chronology
Head for the Door (2004)	A Modern Way of Living with the Truth (2007)

Singles from A Modern Way of Living with the Truth
- 1. "Different Than You" Released: February 20, 2007; 2. "God We Look Good (Going Down in Flames)" Released: August 7, 2007; 3. "These Are the Days" Released: May 6, 2008

Professional ratings
Review scores
Source	Rating
AllMusic	2.5/5 stars
Okayplayer	2.5/5 stars
'PopMatters	4/10 stars

A Modern Way of Living with the Truth is the fourth studio album by The Exies. It was released on May 15, 2007, by Eleven Seven Music.

== Track listing ==
No.	Title	Length
1.	"Leaving Song"	1:52
2.	"Lay Your Money Down"	3:24
3.	"A Fear of Being Alone"	3:57
4.	"Different Than You"	3:59
5.	"This Is the Sound"	4:03
6.	"Stray"	3:36
7.	"Dose"	3:47
8.	"Better Now"	3:51
9.	"My Ordinary World"	4:02
10.	"These Are the Days"	3:46
11.	"A Modern Way of Living with the Truth"	3:40
12.	"Once in a Lifetime" (Byrne/Eno)	4:36
13.	"Spectator at the Revolution"	1:17

iTunes rerelease
No.	Title	Length
14.	"God We Look Good (Going Down in Flames)"	3:15
15.	"My Goddess" (Acoustic)	2:57
16.	"Ugly" (Acoustic)	3:26
17.	"Genius" (Acoustic)	3:50
18.	"Tired of You" (Acoustic)	4:01

- The song "Lay Your Money Down" was featured on the "WWE Smackdown vs. Raw 2009" soundtrack, however was not released as a single.
- The song “Dose” was featured on the “Baja: Edge of Control” soundtrack; however it was an instrumental version without any lyrics.
