= Death Acoustic =

Studio album by Nick Oliveri
- Released: October 6, 2009
- Recorded: 2009
- Genre: Acoustic rock, Stoner rock
- Length: 30:21
- Label: Impedance
- Producer: Nick Oliveri

Nick Oliveri chronology
Demolition Day (2004)	Death Acoustic (2009)	Leave Me Alone (2014)

Professional ratings
Review scores
Source	Rating
AllMusic	1/5 stars
Blistering	7.5/10
Pitchfork	3.5/10

Death Acoustic is a solo acoustic record by American musician Nick Oliveri. The album contains mostly cover songs of bands Oliveri is involved in directly or is a fan of. Bands covered include Raw Power, GG Allin, Moistboyz, Kyuss, Queens of the Stone Age, The Misfits, and The Dwarves.

On January 15, 2010 the album was nominated for a High Times 2010 Doobie Award in the "Best Alternative Rock Artist" category. The winning nominees were awarded on March 21, 2010.

== Track listing ==
1. "Start A Fight" - 2:22 (Mauro)
2. "Invisible Like The Sky" - 2:46 (Oliveri)
3. "Dairy Queen" - 2:49 (Dahlia)
4. "I'm Gonna Leave You" - 3:28 (Homme/Oliveri)
5. "Love Has Passed Me By" - 3:07 (Kyuss)
6. "U Blow" - 4:29 (Dickie Moist/Mickey Moist)
7. "Hybrid Moments" - 2:08 (Glenn Danzig)
8. "Unless I Can Kill" - 1:37 (Oliveri)
9. "Follow Me" - 2:07 (Dahlia)
10. "Outlaw Scumfuc" - 5:24 (GG Allin/Oliveri)

== Credits ==
- Recorded and produced by Nick Oliveri except "Outlaw Scumfuc" recorded by Bradley Cook
- Additional guitar on "Outlaw Scumfuc" by Chris Henry
- Mastered by Rock O'neil at Turtlerock
- Design and layout Carl Whitbread
