= Nick Oliveri =

American musician (born 1971)

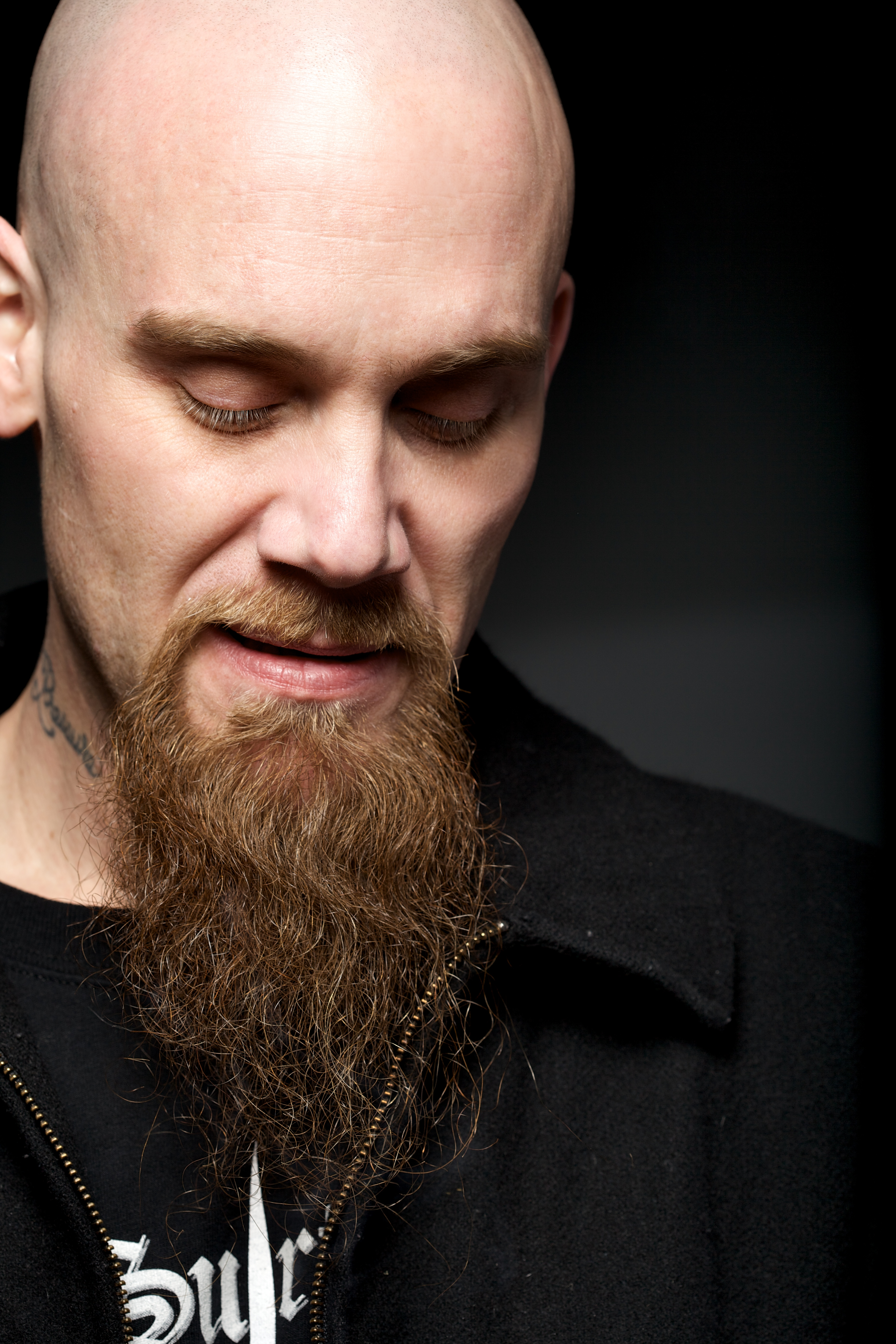
- Oliveri in 2009

Background information
- Also known as: Rex Everything; Pierre Pressure; The Great French Manipulator; Rock & Roll Komodo Dragon; Nikolai Svetlana
- Born: Nick Steven Oliveri; October 21, 1971 (age 55); Los Angeles, California, U.S.
- Genres: Heavy metal; stoner rock; desert rock; alternative metal; hard rock; punk rock; alternative rock
- Occupations: Musician; songwriter; singer
- Instruments: Bass; guitar; vocals; percussion; organ; synthesizer
- Works: Nick Oliveri discography
- Labels: Tornado; Impedance; Schnitzel; Heavy Psych Sounds
- Member of: Mondo Generator; Stöner; Dwarves; Bl'ast!; Death Machine II; Death Machine III
- Formerly of: Kyuss; Queens of the Stone Age; Vista Chino; Bloodclot; The Desert Sessions; Royale Daemons

Nick Steven Oliveri (born October 21, 1971) is an American multi-instrumentalist, singer and songwriter. He is best known as a former bassist of Kyuss and later Queens of the Stone Age from 1998 to 2004. Oliveri is also a solo artist and frequent contributor to his friends' albums and tours, including Winnebago Deal, Masters of Reality, Turbonegro, Moistboyz, Svetlanas and Big Scenic Nowhere among many others.

He is the frontman of his project Mondo Generator, a punk and metal hybrid that he formed in 1997, and the co-founder of the stoner rock power trio, Stöner. He has also worked periodically with the Dwarves since 1993.

== Early life ==
Nick Steven Oliveri was born in Los Angeles on October 21, 1971, and was then raised in Palm Springs from the age of 11. His first instrument was a guitar but he later moved to bass. His major influences were Kiss, Black Sabbath, Ramones, Rush and Van Halen. Oliveri was described by lifelong friend Brant Bjork as having a lifestyle reminiscent of the fictional character Spicoli in the film Fast Times at Ridgemont High in his youth.

== Career ==
=== Kyuss ===
He began his career in 1987 as a guitarist, when he formed Katzenjammer with bandmates John Garcia, Josh Homme, Chris Cockrell and Brant Bjork. In early 1989, shortly after Oliveri's departure, the band changed its name to Sons of Kyuss, and after self-releasing an EP in 1990, the band re-recruited Oliveri on bass to replace Cockrell, and shortened their name to Kyuss.

Oliveri left the band following completion of Blues for the Red Sun and was replaced by Scott Reeder, who had been approached about joining Kyuss five to six months earlier during a West Coast tour with The Obsessed. Following his departure from Kyuss, Oliveri joined the Dwarves as an on and off again bassist under the moniker "Rex Everything".

=== Mondo Generator ===
Nick Oliveri (under the moniker "Rex Everything") formed Mondo Generator in 1997 and with friends Josh Homme, Brant Bjork, Rob Oswald, Karl Doyle and others, recorded the debut album, Cocaine Rodeo. The album wouldn't be released until three years later due to Oliveri and Homme being full-time members of Queens of the Stone Age. The album was released by cult-favorite Southern Lord Records in 2000. There was little support of the album by the way of live shows, and the band gained cult status among the most devoted Queens of the Stone Age fans.

As of April 2007, Mondo Generator was scheduled to appear on the 12th annual Ozzfest tour (otherwise known as the "FreeFest" tour), but officially dropped off the tour on July 26, 2007 after appearing at four Ozzfest dates. Oliveri stated, "This year it was free for the crowd, which was a great thing, but essentially the bands were playing for free too and we just couldn't afford to do that."

=== Queens of the Stone Age ===
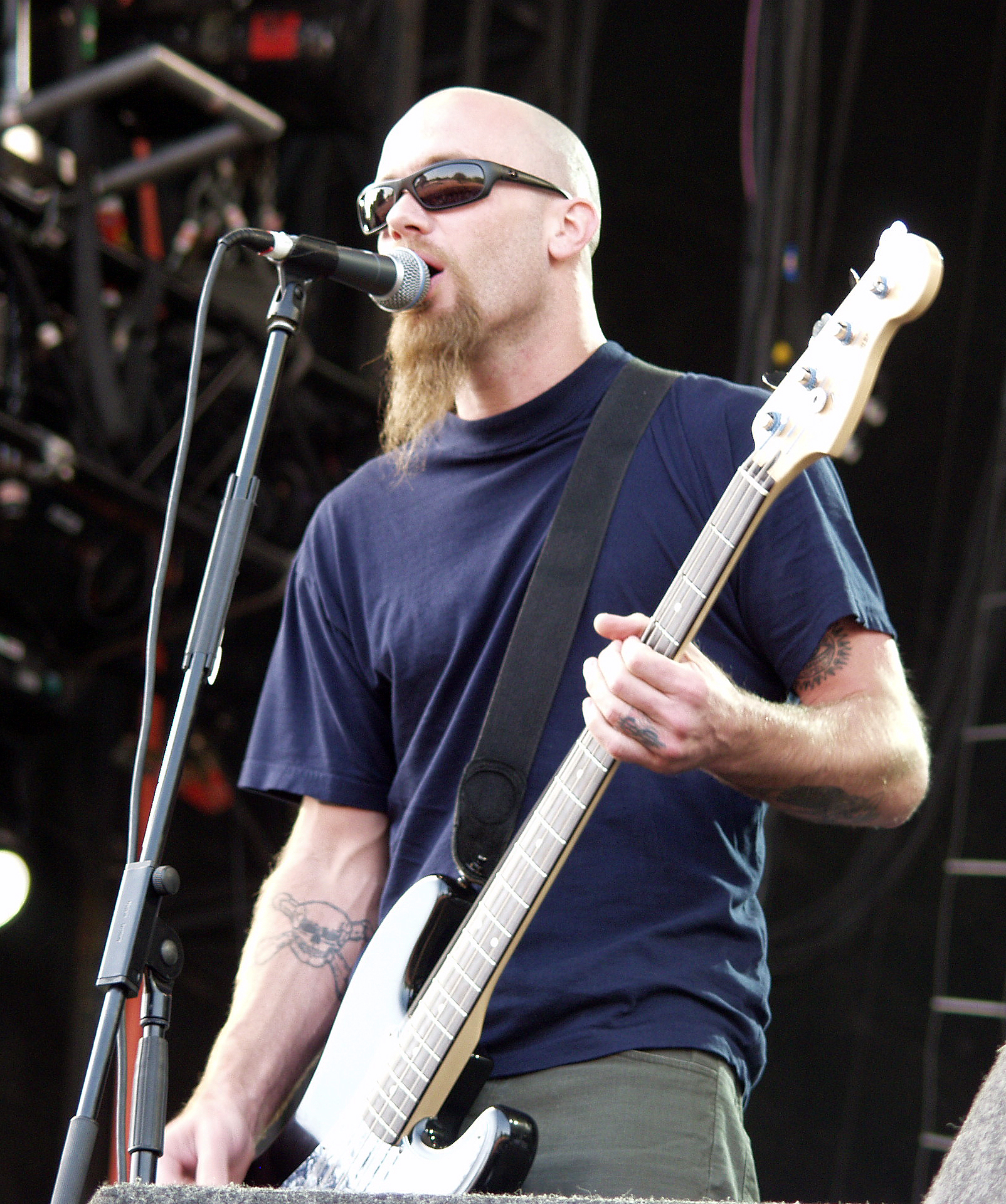
Oliveri performing with Queens of the Stone Age at the 2003 V Festival

Oliveri was a core contributor to Queens of the Stone Age from 1998 to 2004, playing bass and providing backup and lead vocals on two of the band's biggest albums, Rated R and Songs for the Deaf, in addition to co-writing most of the album's songs with bandmate Josh Homme. He first appeared on the band's self titled debut album in the form of a voicemail confirming his commitment to the band on the album's final song, "I Was a Teenage Hand Model".

Oliveri's lead singing can be heard on songs such as "Auto Pilot", "Tension Head" and "Quick and to the Pointless" from Rated R and "Another Love Song", "Gonna Leave You", "Six Shooter" and "You Think I Ain't Worth a Dollar but I Feel Like a Millionaire", from Songs for the Deaf.

In January 2004, following a string of dates touring in Australia, Oliveri was fired from the band, with reasoning at first being aggressive treatment of the band's fans, later being accusations of possible abuse to his girlfriend. Oliveri has said to have come to the conclusion himself that during a soundcheck at a show in Spain in 2003, he acted too aggressively to Josh Homme over his relationship with then-girlfriend Brody Dalle after getting too drunk on wine, raising tension between the two. In a 2005 interview with BBC Radio 1, Homme stated that he had approached Oliveri about the abuse rumors and told him, "If I ever find out that this is true, I can’t know you, man." He also revealed an incident that occurred in the UK involving Oliveri and vocalist Mark Lanegan where the former "almost didn't make it out of the country."

=== Post-Queens of the Stone Age ===
Since his firing from Queens of the Stone Age, Oliveri has recorded an acoustic LP entitled Demolition Day that was eventually released as a second disc in the limited edition of the Mondo Generator album, Dead Planet: SonicSlowMotionTrails. In September 2006, Oliveri stated "I feel that Queens is something I can contribute to and Josh Homme needs me to do it."

There was speculation that he would return in Queens of the Stone Age during their summer tour due to Josh Homme's dedication of "New Fang" to Nick for "new beginnings". However, this proved to be false. In March 2011, Oliveri stated: "The last time I saw them play was a benefit for Brian O'Connor in L.A., from the Eagles of Death Metal. I was down there and I mentioned to them, "Why don't I come up and do "Millionaire" or something, and sing it and not play bass?" [Josh] was like, "Nah, I don't think that's a good idea yet." It's kind of in his court for stuff like that. I don't think he wants to give anybody the wrong idea. I don't necessarily know if that would happen. And he's got a good band—he's taking the band in the direction he wants it to go."

In late November 2012, Oliveri contributed vocals on the track "If I Had a Tail" for his former band Queens of the Stone Age on their album …Like Clockwork. Upon hearing fellow former Queens member Dave Grohl would make a return to drums on the album, Oliveri inquired to Josh Homme if he could play bass: "I actually put in a request with Josh. I heard Dave was playing on the record, and I was like, 'Dude! I wanna play bass on it!' I'd be a fool not to ask. If Dave Grohl was playing drums, then I want in. He's an amazing drummer. I never had a better time in my life than when Dave was in the band." Homme instead opted for current bassist Michael Shuman.

In April 2014, Moistboyz opened for Queens of the Stone Age at a concert at the Keller Auditorium in Portland, Oregon. Oliveri then joined Queens of the Stone Age on stage for the first time in over a decade to sing "You Think I Ain't Worth a Dollar, But I Feel Like a Millionaire".

=== Kyuss Lives! ===
In June 2010, former Kyuss members Oliveri and Bjork joined Garcia onstage to perform "Green Machine" and "Gardenia" during a headlining appearance by "Garcia Plays Kyuss" at Hellfest in Clisson, France and they also appeared onstage with Garcia in other concerts on the tour.

In November 2010, Oliveri joined Kyuss Lives! with fellow ex band members Garcia and Bjork. The band initially toured Europe, Australian and New Zealand markets in early 2011, and later toured North America. A new studio album was also being planned following the tour. Due to Oliveri's ongoing legal problems resulting from a July 2011 incident, he was unable to leave the US and Scott Reeder filled in for him on several international dates. After touring domestically in the US with Kyuss Lives! during 2011, Oliveri decided to leave the band in favor of returning to working on Mondo Generator.

However, in March 2012, it was revealed that Josh Homme, after persuading bassist Scott Reeder to support him, had filed a federal lawsuit against John Garcia and Brant Bjork alleging "trademark infringement and consumer fraud" over the use of the Kyuss name despite the fact Brant Bjork had originally created the name. Nick Oliveri left Kyuss later that month after it was revealed that Garcia and Bjork had tried to take control of the Kyuss trademark.

In December 2012, he announced his return to Kyuss Lives!, however all touring and promotions since have not featured Oliveri. In August 2013, singer John Garcia said that Vista Chino "is a three-piece band with [himself], Brant [Bjork, drummer] and Bruno [Fevery, guitarist]. It always will be." and described Oliveri as "an honorary band member".

=== Stöner ===
In 2020, Oliveri formed the stoner rock trio Stöner, along with former Kyuss bandmate Brant Bjork and Ryan Güt, touring member for Bjork's live band. The band first appeared on Oliveri's solo album N.O. Hits at All Vol.666. Stöner performed on the fourth volume of the Live in the Mojave Desert concert film series and live albums later in the year.

In 2021, the band released their debut album, Stoners Rule and embarked on a US tour alongside Clutch.

In 2022, Stöner released their sophomore album Totally....

In 2023, the band released their debut EP, Boogie to Baja.

=== Additional projects and contributions ===
In 2005, Oliveri appeared on the Turbonegro album Party Animals as guest vocalist on the song "Final Warning". He joined the band on stage for performances of the song during their US tour in 2007, which included Mondo Generator as support.

In early 2008, Oliveri joined a West Coast offshoot of Moistboyz dubbed Dickie Moist OTC, on bass. In June 2008, he joined Los Angeles-based rock band, The Knives, on bass.

On August 7, 2008, Oliveri appeared on stage with Turbonegro at Øyafestivalen in Oslo to sing "Back to Dungaree High" and "Nervous Breakdown", the former being a song that Queens of the Stone Age had previously covered on the Turbonegro tribute album Alpha Motherfuckers and the latter a Black Flag cover. The band's performance at the festival was the 10th anniversary celebration of their album Apocalypse Dudes. On April 19, 2009, Oliveri again joined Turbonegro on stage for the song "Dungaree High" during their Coachella set.

In 2010, Oliveri appeared on Slash's debut solo album, Slash, contributing vocals to the track "Chains and Shackles" that was included on the Australian edition of the album.

Oliveri co-wrote the song "TNA (The Nihilistic Army)" with members of Turbonegro for their 2012 album Sexual Harassment.

In July 2013, while on tour in Alaska, Oliveri met members of Men With Guns, Lowell George Granath and Cody Kniceley, resulting in the formation of a band called The Situationalists and the recording of two demo tracks. An LP was planned, but did not materialize.

In late November 2013, Oliveri announced that he would be touring with, and playing bass for Moistboyz, the punk/rock project of Dean Ween, which featured then Mondo Generator drummer Hoss Wright, Guy Heller, and Stephen Haas. Oliveri later announced that he and Hoss were also providing the rhythm section for the reunited California thrash outfit Bl'ast!.

In 2015, Oliveri collaborated with Russian punk rock band Svetlanas and occasionally toured with the band. Their album, Naked Horse Rider, featured Oliveri and was recorded at Josh Homme's Pink Duck Studios in California. Oliveri later appeared on the following Svetlanas releases, This Is Moscow Not L.A. in 2017, and Disco Sucks in 2020.

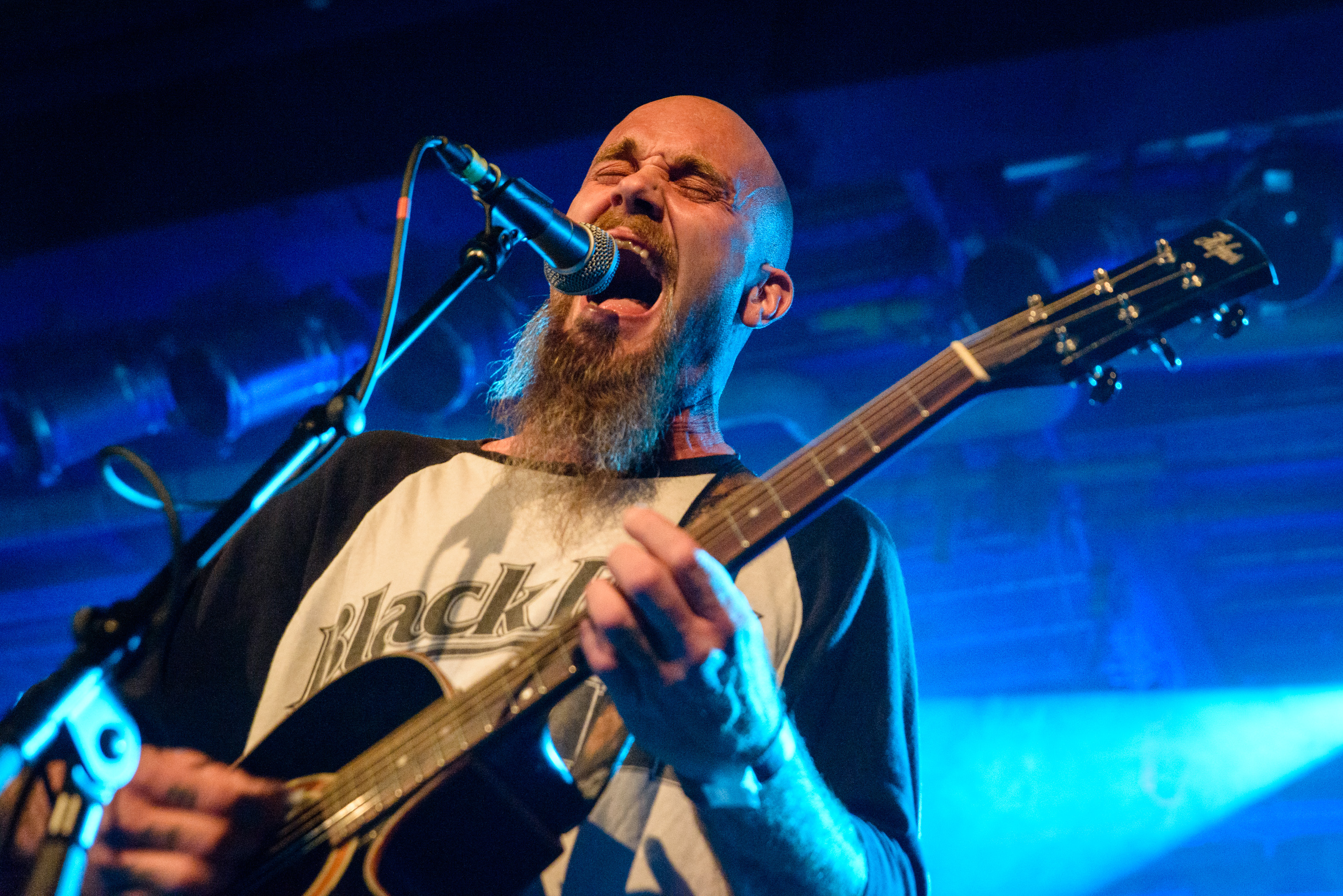
Oliveri in 2015

In November 2016, Oliveri announced the release of a series of compilations titled N.O. Hits at All, to be issued on Heavy Psych Sounds Records. Oliveri commented "...Now for the first time, all these songs and bands I've recorded with over the past 25 years are together and available to you to trip out on. So get your head right, put this record on and play it loud!" N.O. Hits at All Vol.1 was issued on January 27, 2017. N.O. Hits at All Vol.2 was issued on July 7, 2017. N.O. Hits at All Vol.3 was released on October 20, 2017, a day before Oliveri's birthday. N.O. Hits at All Vol.4 was released on February 23, 2018. N.O. Hits at All Vol.5 was released on October 12, 2018. N.O. Hits at All Vol.666 was released on March 6, 2020. N.O. Hits at All Vol.7 was released on July 2, 2021.

In 2019, Oliveri joined Desert Rock veterans Bob Balch (Fu Manchu) and Gary Arce (Yawning Man, Ten East) in the band Big Scenic Nowhere for the group's debut EP, Dying on the Mountain. He again played for the band on their debut full-length album, Vision Beyond Horizon.

In 2020, Oliveri collaborated with the Italian rock band Gunash for the recording of the single "Predators" which appeared on both N.O. Hits at All Vol. 7 and the Gunash album All You Can Hit. Gunash supported Nick Oliveri on his European "Death Acoustic Tour" and Mondo Generator on some dates in Italy and France.

In 2025, Oliveri collaborated with the mexican band Austero, with the song Go To The Light (Too Old To Die Young).

== Legal issues and controversy ==
On July 10, 1999, Oliveri and Josh Homme were involved in an altercation with English rock band Terrorvision while Queens of the Stone Age were on tour in London. Oliveri was arrested as a result, but was released several hours later without being charged.

On January 19, 2001, Oliveri was arrested after a performance at Rock in Rio III in Rio de Janeiro, Brazil, for performing nude on stage. He apologized for the incident and stated that he was not aware that it was a crime in Brazil.

On July 12, 2011, Oliveri was arrested for suspicion of felony domestic violence after a standoff with police SWAT team. He allowed his girlfriend to exit the house two hours into the standoff and two hours before the SWAT team made entry into the home and arrested Oliveri. Drugs and a loaded rifle were found in the home. In August 2012, Oliveri's lawyer reached a plea agreement with prosecutors in his case. His lawyer, Freddy Sayegh, told TMZ, "Oliveri agreed to plead to one count of possession of cocaine and a dismissal of the remaining six felony counts." Oliveri's record in the case was to be expunged as long as he completed court-ordered community service, anger management, and remained out of trouble for six years.

== Pseudonyms ==
Oliveri adopted the "Rex Everything" moniker after shattering a vase at the home of a former Dwarves bassist, who said to Oliveri "Rex Everything". The nickname "Rex" was originally given to Oliveri by Blag Dahlia, but a last name, which became Everything, was needed to go along with it.

"Pierre Pressure" was a nickname given to Oliveri by lifelong friend Josh Homme, to which Homme stated Oliveri pressures people into doing things they should not. "The Great French Manipulator" also came from Homme.

"Rock & Roll Komodo Dragon" originated from an interview with Revolver where Homme states that Oliveri's "a bit like a rock and roll komodo dragon, it's been that way for thousands of years".

"Nikolai Svetlana" was given during Oliveri's tenure with Svetlanas, as each band member uses the band name as their stage last name.

== Discography ==
=== Studio albums ===
- Demolition Day (2004, Tornado)
- Death Acoustic (2009, Impedance)
- Leave Me Alone (2014, Schnitzel) (released under the name "Nick Oliveri's Uncontrollable")

=== Compilation albums ===
- N.O. Hits at All Vol.1 (2017, Heavy Psych Sounds)
- N.O. Hits at All Vol.2 (2017, Heavy Psych Sounds)
- N.O. Hits at All Vol.3 (2017, Heavy Psych Sounds)
- N.O. Hits at All Vol.4 (2018, Heavy Psych Sounds)
- N.O. Hits at All Vol.5 (2018, Heavy Psych Sounds)
- N.O. Hits at All Vol.666 (2020, Heavy Psych Sounds)
- N.O. Hits at All Vol.7 (2021, Heavy Psych Sounds)
- N.O. Hits at All Vol.8 (2024, Heavy Psych Sounds)
- N.O. Hits at All Vol.9 (2024, Heavy Psych Sounds)
