= List of Queens of the Stone Age contributors =

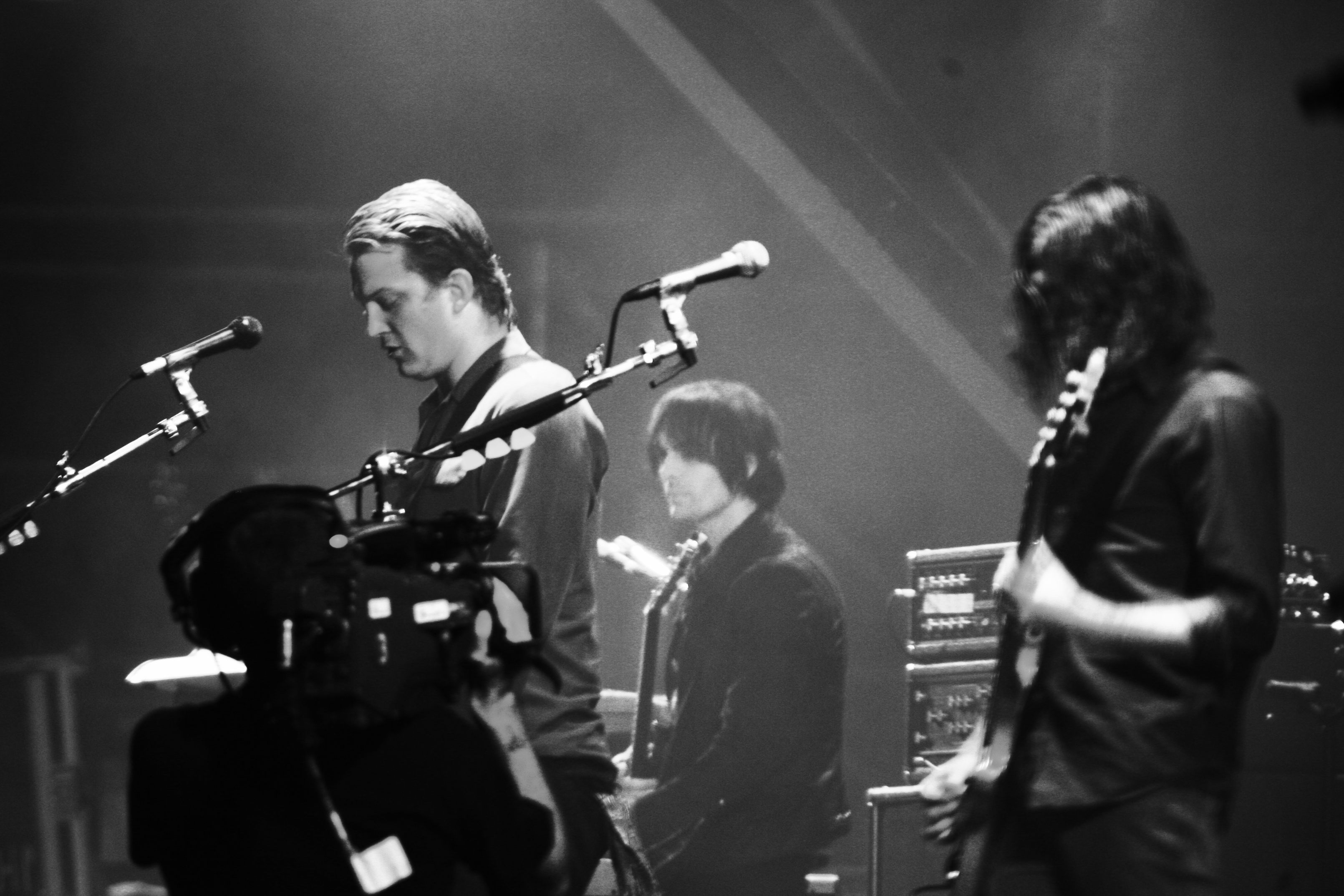
Left to right: Josh Homme, Dean Fertita and Michael Shuman performing at the Eurockéennes festival, 2007

Queens of the Stone Age is an American rock band from Palm Desert, California, formed in 1996. The band frequently changes its line-up, and its records often include guest appearances. The only permanent member of the band is founder Josh Homme, with guitarist Troy Van Leeuwen having been a member since the release of the band's third studio album, Songs for the Deaf, in 2002. Bassist Michael Shuman and keyboardist and guitarist Dean Fertita both joined the band in 2007 to tour in support of its fifth studio album, Era Vulgaris (2007). In 2013, Queens of the Stone Age recorded the album ...Like Clockwork (2013) and Jon Theodore joined as permanent drummer the following year.

== History ==
Queens of the Stone Age was founded by Homme after the breakup of Kyuss, under the name Gamma Ray. This new band released a self titled EP. featuring Matt Cameron of Soundgarden and Pearl Jam, Van Conner from Screaming Trees, and percussionist Victor Indrizzo.

After German band Gamma Ray threatened to sue over the name, Homme changed it to Queens of the Stone Age. The band's first live appearance was on November 20, 1997, at OK Hotel in Seattle, with Cameron on drums, Mike Johnson of Dinosaur Jr. on bass and John McBain of Monster Magnet on guitar. Queens of the Stone Age released their self-titled debut in 1998. Homme played most instruments with Alfredo Hernández contributing drums.

Soon after the recording sessions were finished for the album, former Kyuss bassist Nick Oliveri joined the group, and touring commenced with a band consisting entirely of ex-Kyuss members. Dave Catching, a former Kyuss guitar tech, joined shortly after. From this point forward, the band's line-up would change frequently; by the time their second album was being recorded, Hernández had left the group to play in other bands.

Gene Trautmann joined as Hernández's replacement, playing on Rated R (2000) alongside Homme, Oliveri and Catching. Brendon McNichol replaced Catching for touring. Mark Lanegan joined the band in 2001 as vocalist. Dave Grohl replaced Trautmann in late 2001, in time for recording Songs for the Deaf (2002). Troy Van Leeuwen replaced McNichol after the albums release.

Mid-way through touring, Grohl was replaced by Joey Castillo. After the tour finished in 2004, Oliveri was fired by Homme, his initial replacement was guitar tech Dan Druff, before Alain Johannes joined full-time in 2005, alongside Natasha Shneider on keyboards. Lanegan left in 2005. Following a tour in 2006, Shneider also left, followed by Johannes in 2007. Their replacements were Dean Fertita and Michael Shuman respectively.

Castillo left the band in 2012, mid-way through the recording of ...Like Clockwork (2013). He was replaced by Grohl for the remaining sessions, with Jon Theodore joining as the band's permanent drummer the following year.

== Members ==
=== Current members ===
Images	Name	Years active	Instruments	Release contributions
	Josh Homme (Note: As the sole founding member of Queens of the Stone Age, Homme has performed and recorded with the band since its inception in 1996 and has been the only constant member of the band.)	1996–present	lead vocals; guitar; slide guitar; piano; keyboards; drums; bass guitar; various other instruments during recording	all Queens of the Stone Age releases
	Troy Van Leeuwen (Note: Has been the band's second guitarist and multi-instrumentalist since 2002, joining the band for the tour preceding the release of Songs for the Deaf. Van Leeuwen has contributed to all subsequent recordings and tours.)	2002–present	guitar; keyboards; synthesizer; lap steel; slide guitar; bass guitar; backing vocals; percussion	All Queens of the Stone Age releases from Lullabies to Paralyze (2005) onwards
	Michael Shuman (Note: Joined the band in 2007 as bassist and backing vocalist for the tour following the release of Era Vulgaris.)	2007–present	bass guitar; backing vocals; synth bass; guitar; synthesizer; percussion; Mellotron	Era Vulgaris-era B-sides (2007); ...Like Clockwork (2013); Villains (2017); In Times New Roman... (2023)
	Dean Fertita (Note: Replaced the late Natasha Shneider as the band's keyboardist and backing vocalist in 2007, also plays guitar and various percussion instruments. Fertita joined the band at the same time as Michael Shuman.)	2007–present	piano; keyboards; synthesizer; guitar; clavinet; backing vocals; percussion	Era Vulgaris-era B-sides (2007); ...Like Clockwork (2013); Villains (2017); In Times New Roman... (2023)
	Jon Theodore (Note: Joined after the departure of Joey Castillo, and interim drummer Dave Grohl, contributing to the final track on ...Like Clockwork and its subsequent tour.)	2013–present	drums; percussion; sampler	...Like Clockwork (2013); Villains (2017); In Times New Roman (2023)

=== Former members ===
Images	Name	Years active	Instruments	Release contributions
	Alfredo Hernández (Note: Recorded the band's debut album, Queens of the Stone Age, and toured in support of the album, leaving the band prior to the recording of Rated R.)	1998–1999	drums	Queens of the Stone Age (1998)
	Dave Catching (Note: Toured and recorded with the band on Rated R and appeared as a guest musician on the rest of the first four albums.)	1998–2000 (guest musician in 1998, 2001–2002, 2004)	guitar; keyboards; lap steel; backing vocals	Queens of the Stone Age (1998); Rated R (2000); Songs for the Deaf (2002); Lullabies to Paralyze (2005)
	Gene Trautmann (Note: Toured and recorded drums and percussion on Rated R, and on two tracks on Songs for the Deaf.)	1999–2001	drums	Rated R (2000); Songs for the Deaf (2002)
	Nick Oliveri (Note: Oliveri had previously played alongside Josh Homme in the band Kyuss, and joined Queens of the Stone as its permanent bass guitarist and co-lead vocalist, in 1998, upon the release of its debut album, Queens of the Stone Age (1998). Oliveri and Homme became the band's core two members, and the duo recorded the breakthrough albums, Rated R and Songs for the Deaf, together before Homme fired Oliveri in 2004 for excessive partying and an alleged incident of domestic abuse. The duo repaired their friendship shortly afterwards. Oliveri, however, did not return to the band. In 2013, upon hearing that former contributor Dave Grohl was recording drums for the band's sixth studio album, ...Like Clockwork, Oliveri asked Homme if he too could return on bass guitar. Homme ultimately did not grant Oliveri's request. He does, however, appear on backing vocals on the album track, "If I Had a Tail". Oliveri made a live appearance singing "Millionaire" in August 2014, and on October 31, 2014, Oliveri reunited with the band once again for the last show of their ...Like Clockwork tour during the encore, performing "Millionaire" along with "Auto Pilot", "Quick and to the Pointless", "Gonna Leave You" and "Another Love Song" for the first time in ten years.)	1998–2004 (session vocalist in 2013; live appearances in 2014 and 2026)	bass guitar; lead and backing vocals; guitar	Rated R (2000); Songs for the Deaf (2002); ...Like Clockwork (2013)
	Mark Lanegan (Note: Founding member Josh Homme had previously performed as a live guitarist for Lanegan's band Screaming Trees in 1996, with Homme subsequently wanting to include Lanegan's vocals on the band's debut album, Queens of the Stone Age (1998). Lanegan, however, did not make a vocal contribution until the recording Rated R, singing lead vocals on the track, "In the Fade", and backing vocals on three other songs. Following the album's release, Lanegan became a full-time member of the band, becoming its third lead vocalist, alongside Homme and Nick Oliveri. The trio, alongside drummer Dave Grohl, recorded the band's third studio album, Songs for the Deaf, with Lanegan remaining in the band until the release of Lullabies to Paralyze in 2005. During the tour that preceded the album's release, Lanegan also provided live keyboards but eventually left the road citing exhaustion. Lanegan eventually returned to live performances, but left the band as a full-time member upon the tour's close. Lanegan subsequently appeared as a backing vocalist on the Era Vulgaris track, "River in the Road", on the ...Like Clockwork tracks, "If I Had a Tail" and "Fairweather Friends", and made live appearances in 2007 and 2010.)	2001–2005 (session vocalist 2000, 2007 and 2013) (one off live appearances in 2007 and 2010) (died 2022)	lead and backing vocals; keyboards (2005)	Rated R (2000), Songs for the Deaf (2002), Lullabies to Paralyze (2005), Era Vulgaris (2007), ...Like Clockwork (2013)
	Dave Grohl (Note: Grohl replaced Gene Trautmann during the recording of the band's third studio album, Songs for the Deaf, performing drums and percussion on the majority of the album's tracks. Grohl remained within the band during its initial tour dates in support of the album, before returning to his primary project, Foo Fighters, later that year. In 2007, Grohl made a one-off guest appearance with the band to perform "Make It wit Chu", and subsequently replaced his successor Joey Castillo, in late 2012, recording drums on ...Like Clockwork. He made another one-off live appearance to play drums on My God Is the Sun at the 2014 Grammy Awards.)	2001–2002 (session drummer in 2012–2013) (one-off live appearances in 2007 and 2014)	drums; percussion	Songs for the Deaf (2002); ...Like Clockwork (2013)
	Joey Castillo (Note: Initially called in to replace drummer Dave Grohl for the European leg of the Songs for the Deaf tour, Castillo remained a member of the band until November 2012, when he was fired by Homme during the recording of ...Like Clockwork. Castillo recorded drums on Lullabies to Paralyze, the live album, Over the Years and Through the Woods, Era Vulgaris, and contributed to four tracks on ...Like Clockwork before his dismissal.)	2002–2012	drums; percussion	Lullabies to Paralyze (2005); Over the Years and Through the Woods (2005); Era Vulgaris (2007); ...Like Clockwork (2013)
	Alain Johannes (Note: Johannes has been a close collaborator of the band since 2000, initially co-producing three of Rated R's B-sides, under the moniker "The Exotic Pets", with Josh Homme. Johannes subsequently appeared on Songs for the Deaf, performing on four of the album's tracks, and made significant contributions to Lullabies to Paralyze, following Nick Oliveri's departure. Johannes toured with the band throughout 2005, appearing on the live album, Over the Years and Through the Woods, and recorded both guitar and bass on Era Vulgaris. Johannes is credited with providing "additional engineering" on ...Like Clockwork, and is also a live member of Homme's side-project, Them Crooked Vultures.)	2005–2007 (recording engineer, co-producer and session musician in 2000–2005 and 2007–present)	bass guitar; guitar; piano; organ; backing vocals	Songs for the Deaf (2002); Lullabies to Paralyze (2005); Over the Years and Through the Woods (2005); Era Vulgaris (2007)
	Natasha Shneider (Note: Formerly of the band Eleven - alongside her husband Alain Johannes - Shneider first recorded the B-sides, "Never Say Never" and "Who'll Be the Next in Line", with the band, providing keyboards and piano. Schneider subsequently appeared on Songs for the Deaf, performing on three of the album's tracks, and joined the band as a full member in 2005 during the Lullabies to Paralyze tour, appearing on the live album, Over the Years and Through the Woods. On July 2, 2008, Shneider died following a battle with cancer. The band performed a concert in celebration of her life on August 16, 2008 at the Henry Fonda Theatre in Los Angeles.)	2005-2006 (session musician in 2000 and 2002) (died 2008)	keyboards; backing vocals	Rated R-era B-sides ("Never Say Never" & "Who'll Be the Next in Line"); Songs for the Deaf (2002); Over the Years and Through the Woods (2005)

=== Touring members ===
Image	Name	Years active	Instruments	Notes
	Matt Cameron	1997; 2008	drums	Played drums during live appearances in 1997 and 2008.
	John McBain	1997	guitar	Made live appearances with the band in 1997 and co-wrote "Regular John".
	Mike Johnson	1997	bass; backing vocals	Performed with the band on their first ever shows in 1997 and was credited for sitting on a sofa during the recording of the self-titled record and provided backing vocals on the track "Leg of Lamb" on Rated R.
	Pete Stahl	1998–1999	lead and backing vocals	Contributed backing vocals to the track, "Lost Art of Keeping A Secret", on Rated R, and the B-sides, "Ode to Clarissa" and "Born to Hula". Stahl also toured with the band from 1998 to 1999 to perform backing vocals on various songs and performed lead vocals on Desert Sessions songs that were played, including "Cake (Who Shit in The?)" and "At the Helm of Hells Ships". He made a further live appearance on September 25, 2000, to perform "Nova".
	Mario Lalli	1999	guitar; lap steel guitar; keyboards; backing vocals	Filled in for Dave Catching who was touring in Europe with earthlings? between April 10 and May 14, 1999.
	Brendon McNichol	2000–2002	guitar; lap steel guitar; keyboards; backing vocals	Replaced Dave Catching during live performances and also recorded parts of Songs for the Deaf before leaving the band.
	Dan Druff	2004	bass; guitar; backing vocals	Was a longtime guitar tech for Queens since Rated R. After Oliveri's departure from the band in 2004, Dan Druff briefly joined the touring line up playing bass and guitar.
	Trent Reznor	2014	keyboards; backing vocals	Played keys on My God Is the Sun live at the Grammy Awards in January 2014 and produced the bonus track "Era Vulgaris" from the album of the same name as well as contributing vocals and drum programming on "Kalopsia" and background vocals on "Fairweather Friends" from ...Like Clockwork.

== Contributors ==
"It really is more of a musical experiment… It keeps moving and reinventing itself. That way we never get painted into a corner."

— Josh Homme, 2000

=== Guitarists ===
- Chris Goss – A long time collaborator with the band throughout their career, contributing on every album previous to ...Like Clockwork with various instruments, mainly guitars, and co-producing Rated R and Era Vulgaris together with Josh Homme as the Fififf Teeners. Has also made several live appearances throughout the band's career.
- Dean Ween (aka Mickey Melchiondo) – Played guitar and provided backing vocals during the recording of Songs for the Deaf.
- Billy Gibbons – Recorded "Burn the Witch", as well as the bonus tracks, "Precious and Grace" and "Like a Drug" for Lullabies to Paralyze. Also made live appearances in 2005 which can be seen in the bonus footage on the Over the Years and Through the Woods DVD.
- Aaron North – Made guest appearances with the band at various performances in 2005.
- Lindsey Buckingham – Played guitar on My God Is the Sun live at the Grammy Awards in January 2014.

=== Bassists ===
- Milo Beenhakker – Performed on the track "18 A.D" which appeared on the Burn One Up! album in 1997.
- Van Conner – Performed on the Gamma Ray EP and the Kyuss/Queens of the Stone Age.

=== Drummers/Percussionists ===
- Victor Indrizzo – Recorded on the Kyuss/Queens of the Stone Age split and the Gamma Ray EP.
- Eva Nahon – Recorded drums for the track "18 A.D" which appeared on the Burn One Up! album in 1997.
- Nick Lucero – Played drums on six tracks and percussion on two tracks in session during the recording of Rated R.
- Barrett Martin – Recorded percussion on two tracks and vibes on two tracks as well as steel drums on one track on Rated R.

=== Keyboardists ===
- Hutch – Queens sound engineer since its inception in 1998. Also recorded piano for "I Was a Teenage Hand Model" from their self-titled album.
- Elton John – Recorded piano and vocals on the track, "Fairweather Friends", on ...Like Clockwork.

=== Vocalists ===
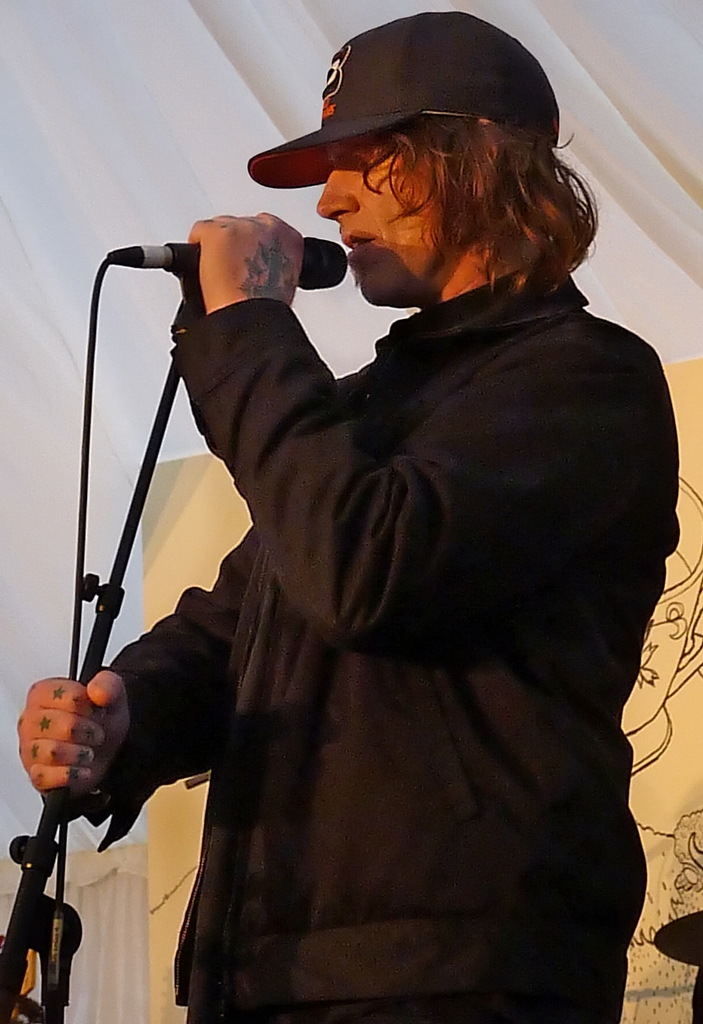
Mark Lanegan

- Blag Dahlia – Lead vocals on "Punk Rock Caveman Living in a Prehistoric Age" in San Francisco in 2000.
- Tobey Torres – Backing vocals on "Quick and to the Pointless" at Reading Festival 2001.
- John Garcia – contributed backing vocals to 1997's "Kyuss/Queens of the Stone Age" split EP and made a live appearance on December 20, 2005, performing Kyuss songs with the band.
- Wendy Rae Moan – Contributed backing vocals to the tracks, "Feel Good Hit of the Summer" and "Quick and to the Pointless", on Rated R.
- Nick Eldorado – Contributed backing vocals to the tracks, "Feel Good Hit of the Summer" and "Quick and to the Pointless", on Rated R.
- Rob Halford – Contributed backing vocals to the track, "Feel Good Hit of the Summer", on Rated R.
- Brody Dalle – Contributed backing vocals to two of the band's studio albums: Lullabies to Paralyze and Era Vulgaris. Also appeared live with Queens to sing lead and backing vocals at the tribute concert for Natasha Shneider in 2008.
- Shirley Manson – Contributed backing vocals to the track, "You Got a Killer Scene There, Man...", on Lullabies to Paralyze.
- Julian Casablancas – provided backing vocals to "Sick, Sick, Sick" on Era Vulgaris, and played casio guitar on the same track. Also appeared at the Pearl Jam Twenty Festival in 2011 to sing on "Sick, Sick, Sick".
- Serrina Sims – Contributed backing vocals to the track "Make It wit Chu" on Era Vulgaris. Also sang backing vocals at the tribute concert for Natasha Shneider in 2008.
- Liam Lynch – Contributed backing vocals to the track, "Make It wit Chu" on Era Vulgaris.
- PJ Harvey – Vocals on several songs from Desert Sessions Volumes 9 & 10, vocalist on "Make it wit Chu" and one of her own songs at the tribute concert for Natasha Shneider in 2008.
- Jesse Hughes – Backing vocals on "Make it wit Chu" and lead vocals on Eagles of Death Metal song "Speaking in Tongues" at the tribute concert for Natasha Shneider in 2008.
- Bobby Gillespie – Sang lead vocals on the Brian Eno cover Needles in the Camel's Eye, which is the B-side to Make it Wit Chu.
- Eddie Vedder – Backing vocals and cowbell on "Little Sister" at the Pearl Jam Twenty Festival in 2011 and at Lollapalooza Chile in 2013.
- Alex Turner – Contributed backing vocals to the track, "If I Had a Tail", on ...Like Clockwork, and co-wrote the lyrics to "Kalopsia" on the same album.
- Jake Shears – Provided co-lead vocals to the track "Keep Your Eyes Peeled", on ...Like Clockwork. Contributed lead vocals to the Desert Sessions track "Something You Can't See", on Vols. 11 & 12, along with backing vocals for several other songs on the same album.
- Nikka Costa – Contributed backing vocals on Villains.
- Matt Sweeney – Contributed backing vocals on Villains.
- Fred Martin – Contributed backing vocals on Villains.
- Tai Phillips – Contributed backing vocals on Villains.
- Faith Matovia – Contributed backing vocals on Villains.

== Lineups ==
Period	Members	Studio releases
1996–1998	Josh Homme – vocals, guitar, bass	none
1998	Josh Homme – lead vocals, guitar, bass, keyboards, piano; Alfredo Hernández – drums	Queens of the Stone Age (1998)
1998–1999	Josh Homme – lead vocals, guitar, keyboards, piano; Alfredo Hernández – drums; Dave Catching – guitar, keyboards, lap steel, backing vocals; Nick Oliveri – bass, backing & lead vocals	none
1999–2000	Josh Homme – lead vocals, guitar, keyboards, piano; Dave Catching – guitar, keyboards, lap steel, backing vocals; Nick Oliveri – bass, backing & lead vocals; Gene Trautmann – drums	Rated R (2000)
2000–2001	Josh Homme – lead vocals, guitar, keyboards, piano; Nick Oliveri – bass, backing & lead vocals; Gene Trautmann – drums	none
2001–2002	Josh Homme – lead vocals, guitar, keyboards, piano; Nick Oliveri – bass, backing & lead vocals; Gene Trautmann – drums; Mark Lanegan – lead & backing vocals	none
2002	Josh Homme – lead vocals, guitar, piano; Nick Oliveri – bass, backing & lead vocals; Mark Lanegan – lead & backing vocals; Dave Grohl – drums, percussion; Troy Van Leeuwen – guitar, keyboards, lap steel, backing vocals	Songs for the Deaf (2002)
2002–2004	Josh Homme – lead vocals, guitar, piano; Nick Oliveri – bass, backing & lead vocals; Mark Lanegan – lead & backing vocals; Troy Van Leeuwen – guitar, keyboards, lap steel, backing vocals; Joey Castillo – drums, percussion	none
2004–2005	Josh Homme – lead vocals, guitar, bass, piano; Mark Lanegan – lead & backing vocals, keyboards; Troy Van Leeuwen – guitar, keyboards, lap steel, bass, backing vocals; Joey Castillo – drums, percussion	Lullabies to Paralyze (2005)
2005–2006	Josh Homme – lead vocals, guitar, bass, piano; Troy Van Leeuwen – guitar, keyboards, lap steel, bass, backing vocals; Joey Castillo – drums, percussion; Natasha Shneider – keyboards, backing vocals; Alain Johannes – bass, guitar, piano, organ, backing vocals	Era Vulgaris (2007)
2006–2007	Josh Homme – lead vocals, guitar, bass, piano; Troy Van Leeuwen – guitar, keyboards, lap steel, bass, backing vocals; Joey Castillo – drums, percussion; Alain Johannes – bass, guitar, piano, organ, backing vocals	Era Vulgaris (2007)
2007–2013	Josh Homme – lead vocals, guitar, piano; Troy Van Leeuwen – guitar, keyboards, lap steel, backing vocals; Joey Castillo – drums, percussion; Michael Shuman – bass, backing vocals, keyboards; Dean Fertita – piano, keyboards, guitar, backing vocals	...Like Clockwork (2013)
2013–present	Josh Homme – lead vocals, guitar, piano; Troy Van Leeuwen – guitar, keyboards, lap steel, backing vocals; Michael Shuman – bass, backing vocals, keyboards; Dean Fertita – piano, keyboards, guitar, backing vocals; Jon Theodore – drums, percussion	Villains (2017); In Times New Roman... (2023)
