= In My Head (Queens of the Stone Age song) =

2005 single by Queens of the Stone Age

Single by Queens of the Stone Age

from the album Lullabies to Paralyze
- Released: June 27, 2005
- Recorded: August – November 2004 at Sound City Studios, Van Nuys, California
- Length: 4:01 (album version); 3:52 (radio edit)
- Label: Interscope
- Songwriters: Joey Castillo; Josh Freese; Joshua Homme; Alain Johannes; Troy van Leeuwen
- Producers: Joshua Homme; Joe Barresi

Queens of the Stone Age singles chronology
"Little Sister" (2004)	"In My Head" (2005)	"Burn the Witch" (2006)

"In My Head...Or Something"

Song by The Desert Sessions

from the album Volume 10: I Heart Disco
- Released: September 23, 2003
- Recorded: February 8–15, 2003 at Rancho de la Luna, Joshua Tree, CA
- Length: 4:41
- Label: Ipecac, Rekords Rekords
- Songwriters: Joey Castillo; Josh Freese; Joshua Homme; Alain Johannes; Troy van Leeuwen
- Producers: Joshua Homme; Alain Johannes

"In My Head" is a single released by the rock group Queens of the Stone Age on June 27, 2005, from their fourth album Lullabies to Paralyze. The song originally featured as a track from The Desert Sessions, appearing on Volume 10: I Heart Disco in 2003 where it was named "In My Head...Or Something".

The version of the song on Lullabies to Paralyze first appeared in November 2004, on the soundtrack of the racing video game Need for Speed: Underground 2. The song is available as downloadable content for Rock Band 3 and also appears in the end credits during the Entourage episode "The Release".

A music video for the song was released that was later castigated by guitarist Troy Van Leeuwen:

...[I]t just happened to be the only time we listened to the record label and it was such a fuck up on our part. The video we ended up with for that song is so lame! It was three of us against a green screen with effects added later. It was like a fucking Gap commercial. It was terrible. Just terrible. We were on the road so we weren't in control of it.

— Troy Van Leeuwen in interview with SuicideGirls.com

== Track list ==
1. "In My Head" - 4:03
2. "I Think I Lost My Headache" (Live) - 5:57
3. "God Is in the Radio" (Live) - 7:53

== Personnel ==
The Desert Sessions – Volume 10: I Heart Disco

- Josh Homme – lead vocals, drums
- Josh Freese – drums, bass
- Troy Van Leeuwen – guitar
- Alain Johannes – guitar
- Dean Ween – piano

Queens of the Stone Age – Lullabies to Paralyze

- Josh Homme – lead vocals, bass
- Joey Castillo – drums, piano, percussion
- Troy Van Leeuwen – lead guitar, backing vocals
- Alain Johannes – rhythm guitar

== Charts ==
Chart (2005)	Peak position
UK Singles (Official Charts)	44
US Mainstream Rock (Billboard)	39
US Alternative Airplay (Billboard)	32
