= The Fun Machine Took a Shit & Died =

- Cover of the 2007 version

Single by Queens of the Stone Age

from the album Era Vulgaris (international CDs except UK and Australasia)
- Released: 12 June 2007
- Recorded: Early 2007
- Genre: Psychedelic rock; blues rock
- Length: 6:55
- Label: Interscope
- Songwriter: Josh Homme
- Producers: Chris Goss; Josh Homme

Queens of the Stone Age singles chronology
"3's & 7's" (2007)	"The Fun Machine Took a Shit & Died" (2007)	"Make It wit Chu" (2007)

"The Fun Machine Took a Shit & Died" is a song by Queens of the Stone Age, intended for the band's 2005 album, Lullabies to Paralyze. In 2005, a rough studio version of the song was handed out to those who had tickets to the cancelled London shows. In 2007, the song was given away for free with the release of the band's 2007 album Era Vulgaris to those who pre-ordered it.

== History ==
The song was originally intended to be on the band's fourth studio album, Lullabies to Paralyze. However, it didn't make it onto the album after the tapes went missing. They were assumed stolen but were, in fact, misplaced. In an interview with Rolling Stone, singer Josh Homme said "The tapes got lost. Actually, they were just at another studio, but we falsely accused everyone in the world of theft."

A rough studio version of the song was placed on a series of 7" vinyl records, handed out to those who had tickets to the cancelled London shows.

The song was also performed by the band on their first live DVD, Over the Years and Through the Woods.

A new extended studio version of the song was recorded for a CD single released with pre-ordered copies of Era Vulgaris at Insound.com and Newbury Comics, with it also appearing as a bonus track on the German, Brazilian and Japanese editions of the album.

== Track listing ==
=== 2005 7" single ===
No.	Title	Length
1.	"The Fun Machine Took a Shit and Died"	5:34
2.	"Commentary"	5:48

=== 2007 CD single ===
No.	Title	Length
1.	"The Fun Machine Took a Shit & Died"	6:55

== Personnel ==
- Josh Homme – vocals, lead guitar, slide, "Fun Machine", bottles, production
- Joey Castillo – drums, percussion
- Troy Van Leeuwen – guitar, slide guitar
- Alain Johannes – bass, mixing, mastering
