= Burn the Witch (Queens of the Stone Age song) =

Single by Queens of the Stone Age

from the album Lullabies to Paralyze
- Released: January 10, 2006
- Genre: Stoner rock; hard rock; glam rock
- Length: 3:38
- Label: Universal Music Group
- Songwriter(s): Joey Castillo; Joshua Homme; Troy Van Leeuwen
- Producer(s): Joe Barresi; Joshua Homme

Queens of the Stone Age singles chronology
"In My Head" (2005)	"Burn the Witch" (2006)	"Sick, Sick, Sick" (2007)

"Burn the Witch" is the third single released from Queens of the Stone Age's fourth album, Lullabies to Paralyze. Many of its lyrics run parallel with the dark, folkloristic theme for this album.

Along with "You've Got a Killer Scene There, Man...", it borrows heavily from the blues. ZZ Top's guitarist and singer Billy Gibbons appears on lead guitar and backup vocals. Gibbons also plays on a cover of his own band's "Precious and Grace", a bonus track on the album.

The song involves an exchange of vocal lines between the falsetto of Homme and the twin baritones of Gibbons and Mark Lanegan. Gibbons does not regularly tour with the band, so the other vocal was performed by Lanegan, until he stopped touring with the band. Currently, Josh Homme sings alone with backing vocals from the rest of the band. In the previous line-up, Homme played bass and Alain Johannes played a quite different version of Gibbons' solo. This song (its remix by UNKLE) was also featured in and on the soundtrack of Saw II. This song is also featured in the trailer to the fourth season of the HBO series True Blood and in Peaky Blinders.

== Track listing ==
1. "Burn the Witch" (Castillo, Homme, Van Leeuwen) - 3:38
2. "No One Knows" [live] (Homme, Lanegan) - 7:49
3. "I Wanna Make It wit Chu" [live] (Homme, Johannes, Melchiondo) - 4:29
4. "Monsters in the Parasol" [live] (Homme, Lalli) - 4:34
5. "Burn the Witch" [multimedia track] (Castillo, Homme, Van Leeuwen) - 5:38
- All the live tracks are taken from Over the Years and Through the Woods DVD/CD.

== Charts ==
Chart (2005 - 2006)	Peak position
Ireland (IRMA)	36
US Alternative Airplay (Billboard)	40

== Personnel ==
- Joe Barresi – producer, engineer, mixing
- Josh Homme – producer, vocals, bass guitar, guitar licks
- Troy Van Leeuwen – lap steel guitar
- Joey Castillo – drums
- Alain Johannes – guitar, engineer
- Mark Lanegan – vocals
- Billy Gibbons – lead guitar, vocals
- Jack Black – marching
- Liam Lynch – video producer, video director

== Music video ==
The music video is about a witch disturbing people before getting karma from her. It features cameos by Josh Homme, Brody Dalle, Troy Van Leeuwen, Joey Castillo, Chris Goss, Wendy Rae Fowler, Jesse Hughes, Alain Johannes, Natasha Shneider, Billy Gibbons and Serrina Sims.
