= Make It wit Chu =

Single by Queens of the Stone Age

Single by Queens of the Stone Age

from the album Era Vulgaris
- Written: 2003
- Released: October 2007
- Genre: Blues rock
- Length: 4:50 (album); 3:48 (radio edit)
- Label: Interscope
- Songwriters: Josh Homme; Alain Johannes; Michael Melchiondo
- Producers: Chris Goss; Josh Homme

Queens of the Stone Age singles chronology
"The Fun Machine Took a Shit & Died" (2007)	"Make It wit Chu" (2007)	"My God Is the Sun" (2013)

"I Wanna Make It wit Chu"

Song by The Desert Sessions

from the album Volume 9: I See You Hearin' Me
- Released: September 23, 2003
- Recorded: February 8–15, 2003
- Studio: Rancho de la Luna, Joshua Tree, CA
- Length: 3:43
- Label: Ipecac, Rekords Rekords
- Songwriters: Josh Homme; Alain Johannes; Michael Melchiondo
- Producers: Joshua Homme; Alain Johannes

"Make It wit Chu" is a song by American rock band Queens of the Stone Age, released in October 2007 as the third single from their fifth studio album Era Vulgaris.

First released in 2003 under The Desert Sessions, the song was written by band members Josh Homme and Alain Johannes along with Dean Ween of Ween.

== Background ==
The song was originally a track on The Desert Sessions Volumes 9 & 10, entitled "I Wanna Make It wit Chu" and with PJ Harvey on backing vocals; it also appeared on the band's live DVD Over the Years and Through the Woods before being rerecorded for their fifth studio album.

"Make It wit Chu" was announced as the second German single in a newsletter from www.qotsa.de and that it would be released on three limited editions on September 28, 2007. It was also confirmed as the band's next international single as well. According to a report by the NME the B-sides for the single would be the "White Wedding" cover, previously released as a bonus track for Era Vulgaris, and a recording of "Needles in the Camel's Eye" from Brian Eno's Here Come The Warm Jets. Bobby Gillespie is reported to have been involved in the latter according to an interview with the band on SuicideGirls.

At the 2007 MTV Video Music Awards, Josh and Troy, along with Cee Lo Green (on vocals) and Dave Grohl (on drums), played the song in The Palms Casino Hotel, in one of the Fantasy Suites. This song was #60 on Rolling Stone's list of the 100 Best Songs of 2007.

At the end of the song, a keyboard can be heard which starts at about 4:31. This is the same tune played during the chorus of the song Era Vulgaris, which was left off the album of the same name.

The song appears in the video game Guitar Hero 5, the documentary Warren Miller's Playground, and TV show Blindspot.

== Music video ==
Directed by Rio Hackford, the official music video for the song surfaced in October and shows the band performing to a series of couples making out. The video was shot in Joshua Tree and also shows the legendary Rancho De La Luna, where the Desert Sessions are recorded.

The video begins with Homme driving to Rancho De La Luna and the band setting up their musical instruments. They then start to perform the song. The video shows footage of the band performing along with shots of several couples making out and talking. The band appear to be performing for the couples.

In the music video, the guitar solo is also shorter than it is on the album.

== Track listings ==
=== CD ===
1. "Make It wit Chu" (Edit) – 3:48
2. "Needles in the Camel's Eye" – 3:23 (Brian Eno cover)
3. "White Wedding" – 3:52 (Billy Idol cover)
1. "Make It wit Chu (Video)" – 3:48

=== 7" (EU) ===
1. "Make It wit Chu" - 4:50
2. "Needles in the Camel's Eye" - 3:23

=== 7" Version 2 ===
1. "Make It wit Chu (Acoustic)"
2. "White Wedding"

== Personnel ==
The Desert Sessions – Volume 9: I See You Hearin' Me

- Josh Freese – drums
- Alain Johannes – piano, rhodes, "noodles"
- Josh Homme – lead vocals, backing vocals, guitar, percussion, piano
- Dean Ween – guitar
- Brian O'Connor – bass, percussion
- PJ Harvey – backing vocals

Queens of the Stone Age – Era Vulgaris

- Josh Homme – piano, lead vocals, backing vocals, lead guitar, rhodes
- Troy Van Leeuwen – guitar, bass, backing vocals
- Joey Castillo – drums, percussion
- Alain Johannes – harmonic guitar
- Serrina Sims – backing vocals
- Brody Dalle–Homme – backing vocals
- Chris Goss – backing vocals
- Liam Lynch – backing vocals

== Charts ==
Chart (2007–08)	Peak position
Canada Hot 100 (Billboard)	43
Canada Rock (Billboard)	1
Germany (GfK)	90
Scotland (OCC)	31
UK Rock & Metal (Official Charts)	2

== Certifications ==
Region	Certification	Certified units/sales
Brazil (Pro-Música Brasil)	Gold	30,000^{‡}
New Zealand (RMNZ)	Platinum	30,000^{‡}
United Kingdom (BPI)	Silver	200,000^{‡}
^{‡} Sales+streaming figures based on certification alone.
