= Era Vulgaris =

Era Vulgaris, a pseudo-Latin term, may refer to:

- Common Era, the current world-wide calendar
- Era Vulgaris (album), an album by American group Queens Of The Stone Age

== See also ==
- Aleister Crowley (1875–1947), English occultist who coined the phrase
