= Gene Frenkel =

Gene Frenkel may refer to:

- Gene Frankel, actor and theater director (misspelling)
- Gene Frenkle, fictitious character in "More Cowbell" (misspelling)
