= More Cowbell =

Saturday Night Live sketch

- Saturday Night Live sketch
- Bruce Dickinson (Christopher Walken) demands "more cowbell"
- Written by: Will Ferrell
- Cast: Jimmy Fallon; Will Ferrell; Chris Kattan; Chris Parnell; Horatio Sanz; Christopher Walken
- Original air date: April 8, 2000

"More Cowbell" (Note: The sketch is listed by the title "Recording Session" in a 2017 Rolling Stone special, though it is listed on NBC's official website and in most other sources as "More Cowbell".) is a comedy sketch that aired on Saturday Night Live on April 8, 2000. The sketch was written by regular cast member Will Ferrell and depicts the recording of the song "(Don't Fear) The Reaper" by Blue Öyster Cult. The sketch stars guest host Christopher Walken as fictional music producer Bruce Dickinson, and Ferrell as fictional cowbell player Gene Frenkle, whose overzealous playing annoys his bandmates but pleases Dickinson. The sketch also features Chris Parnell as Eric Bloom, Jimmy Fallon as Bobby Rondinelli, Chris Kattan as Buck Dharma, and Horatio Sanz as Joe Bouchard.

The "More Cowbell" sketch has become one of the most popular in the history of SNL; in many "best of" lists of SNL sketches, it places in the top ten (ranked ninth by Rolling Stone, for example). As a result of its popularity, "More cowbell" became an American pop culture catchphrase, and it has even entered the dictionary.

== Synopsis ==
An episode of VH1's Behind the Music documenting the band Blue Öyster Cult showcases footage of the group from a 1976 recording session that produced the band's biggest hit, "(Don't Fear) The Reaper". The producer Bruce Dickinson (played by Christopher Walken) tells the band they have "what appears to be a dynamite sound". The first take seems to go well but the band stops playing because the cowbell part is rather loud and distracting. Dickinson, to the surprise of most of the band, asks for "a little more cowbell" and suggests that the cowbell player, Gene Frenkle (Will Ferrell), "really explore the studio space this time". Frenkle's exuberance in following this advice causes him to bump into his bandmates as he dances around the cramped studio, thrusting his pelvis wildly in all directions, and the band aborts another take.

After the other band members voice their frustrations, Frenkle sheepishly agrees to tone down his performance in the spirit of cooperation. He passive-aggressively plays the cowbell very close to Eric Bloom (Chris Parnell)'s ear and fails to keep time with the rest of the band. The rest of the band expresses frustration with Frenkle, but Dickinson remains focused only on getting more cowbell onto the track. Frenkle makes an impromptu speech to the rest of the band, declaring that Dickinson's stature lends a great deal of weight to his opinion about the cowbell part and that the last time he (Frenkle) checked, they did not have "a whole lot of songs that feature the cowbell" and therefore he would be "doing himself a disservice, and every member of the band" if he "didn't perform the hell out of this". In the end, the band agrees to let Frenkle play the cowbell part his way. The sketch ends with a freeze frame on Frenkle with the superimposed message: "In Memoriam: Gene Frenkle: 1950–2000."

== Cast ==
- Jimmy Fallon as Bobby Rondinelli on drums (Albert Bouchard was the actual drummer at that time).
- Will Ferrell as Gene Frenkle on cowbell
- Chris Kattan as Buck Dharma on guitar (Dharma actually sang lead vocals on the track).
- Chris Parnell as Eric Bloom on lead vocals and guitar
- Horatio Sanz as Joe Bouchard on bass guitar
- Christopher Walken as music producer "The" Bruce Dickinson

== Production ==
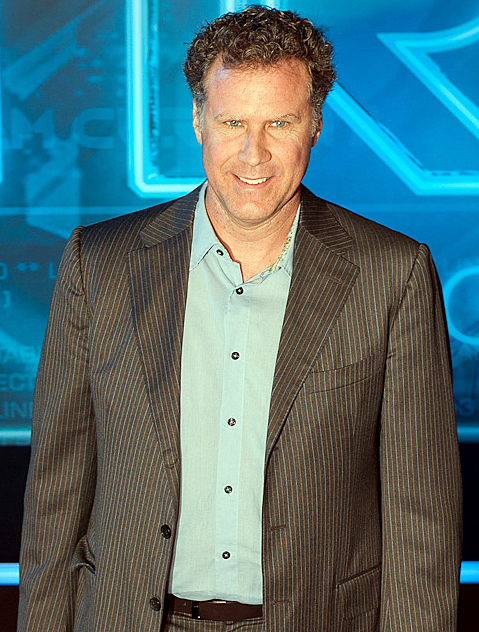
Will Ferrell, seen here in 2010, wrote the sketch.

Will Ferrell's idea for the sketch came from hearing "(Don't Fear) The Reaper" over the years: "Every time I heard [the song], I would hear the faint cowbell in the background and wonder, 'What is that guy's life like?'" Ferrell, who had experience writing sketches for himself from his time with The Groundlings, first submitted the sketch for the episode with Norm Macdonald as host, which aired on October 23, 1999. Some sources credited Donnell Campbell as a co-writer, but this was disproven in an interview with Ferrell and a SNL archive of scripts. SNL creator and executive producer Lorne Michaels was unsure about the premise, though the sketch played well among crew at the table read. According to Seth Meyers, who served as head writer several seasons later, the sketch was submitted over seven times before making the show. Early iterations of the sketch used a woodblock, not a cowbell. Ferrell re-wrote the sketch when Christopher Walken was scheduled to host to fit the actor's rhythm.

The actors who appeared in the sketch had trouble keeping straight faces. They found Ferrell's acting, along with Walken's stone-faced performance, so funny that they were all on the verge of breaking and ruining the sketch several times. On "Take Two", Walken can be seen through the booth glass, laughing, as Ferrell's too-tight shirt rides up, exposing Ferrell's abdomen while he is dancing and playing the cowbell. Ferrell at one point can be seen laughing for a moment soon after Jimmy Fallon laughs for the first time in the sketch. According to Ferrell and Michaels, the sketch did not do well in dress rehearsals, and Ferrell had the idea of performing in a smaller shirt in the live sketch. According to Fallon, Ferrell's tighter shirt made him unable to stop laughing, and he had to bite his drumsticks to avoid breaking the scene.

== Factual accuracy ==
While the song "(Don't Fear) The Reaper" by Blue Öyster Cult does indeed include a cowbell playing throughout, its sound is largely drowned out by the rest of the instruments. According to Donald "Buck Dharma" Roeser, the lead singer and author-composer of the song, the sketch accurately portrays the band's look during the 1970s, but it inaccurately portrays some of the details of the actual recording:

- The sketch has the recording session taking place at Sunshine Studios in late 1976. In reality, the song was recorded at the Record Plant in New York City, in late 1975 or early 1976 (the album the song first appeared on, Agents of Fortune, was released in May 1976).
- Parnell plays the group's lead singer, "Eric". While Eric Bloom was the band's lead singer, Roeser performed lead vocals for the song. The drummer Albert Bouchard is incorrectly referred to as "Bobby" (Bobby Rondinelli, their drummer at the time the skit aired), and the keyboard player Allen Lanier is notably absent.
- Gene Frenkle is a fictional character invented for the sketch, although his appearance was modeled on Eric Bloom's appearance at the time. Despite the fact that Frenkle is fictional, fans occasionally express their sympathies to Blue Öyster Cult over his death.
- Christopher Walken portrays the producer Bruce Dickinson. The song was actually produced by David Lucas, who not only discovered Blue Öyster Cult and co-produced their first eponymous album but went on to produce their subsequent albums Agents of Fortune and Spectres. The actual Bruce Dickinson was only a mid-level manager at Columbia Records whose name appears on a Blue Öyster Cult reissue CD and a "greatest hits" compilation as the "reissue producer". The SNL intern who was sent out to get the album Agents of Fortune got the hits compilation instead.
- "Bruce Dickinson" also happens to be the name of the lead singer of heavy metal band Iron Maiden, which Dickinson joined in 1981.
- Ferrell later revealed that the father of a woman working in the SNL art department worked with BOC on Agents of Fortune. She reported to Ferrell that the band had seen the sketch and said the actual cowbell player was not unlike Ferrell's interpretation. The producer David Lucas, on his website and in later interviews when he was inducted into the Buffalo Music Hall of Fame, reported that he was the one who actually played the cowbell. In interviews, Bouchard has also claimed to be the real cowbell player, saying Lucas confused the songs on which he played cowbell, although he credits Lucas with the idea.

== Reception ==
The sketch's offbeat nature, as well as the actors breaking character, made the sketch an immediate fan favorite. Marc Spitz called it "one of the first super-memes of the new century" in The New York Times. Walken continued to hear from fans about the sketch in years afterward: "I hear about it everywhere I go. It's been YEARS, and all anybody brings up is 'COW-bell.' I guess you never know what's gonna click." Ferrell even speculates that it "ruined" Walken's life. Members of Blue Öyster Cult reacted favorably to the sketch. The song's lead vocalist, Buck Dharma, asserted in 2016 that the song had been deemed creepy before "Ferrell pretty much sabotaged that" but that its initial intent "has not only been restored but also seems to be unstoppable".

== In popular culture ==
=== Will Ferrell ===
Will Ferrell has since played the cowbell alongside other artists, either in character as Gene Frenkle or as himself.

On May 14, 2005, on an episode that Will Ferrell hosted, the Gene Frenkle character made a reappearance on the set of Saturday Night Live as musical guest Queens of the Stone Age played their first song of the night, "Little Sister" – which features a jam block, an instrument similar to a cowbell. In his Gene Frenkle costume, Ferrell played the song's jam block part using a large cowbell along with the band, drawing much applause.

At the end of the May 16, 2009 Will Ferrell/Green Day episode, Green Day performed "East Jesus Nowhere" with Ferrell on the cowbell. Ferrell's appearance was unrehearsed and it was unknown to Green Day that Ferrell would appear. Additionally, Ferrell was unfamiliar with the song and not aware of the sound-break near its end. As the sound-break continued, Ferrell elaborately played single "final" cowbell beats, expecting the lights to fade, then began to leave the stage. Lead singer Billie Joe Armstrong called him back, saying, "Wait, goddammit!" and began his vocal. Ferrell came to the microphone and asked, "Wait, is this song still going on?" Laughing, Armstrong answered, "Yes."

Ferrell guest-starred on the final episode of The Tonight Show with Conan O'Brien, playing cowbell in reference to the sketch.

Ferrell appeared in the 2011 video for "Make Some Noise" by the Beastie Boys, in the front of a limo, playing a cowbell.

Ferrell and Red Hot Chili Peppers drummer Chad Smith (with whom Ferrell is often said to bear resemblance) appeared on the May 22, 2014 episode of The Tonight Show Starring Jimmy Fallon for a charity drum-off battle. Despite Smith clearly giving the better performance, Ferrell was named the winner and awarded a giant gold cowbell after Ferrell, realizing he could not outplay Smith, pulled out a cowbell after the latter's third solo, whereupon both were joined by the rest of the Chili Peppers (Anthony Kiedis, Flea and Josh Klinghoffer) for a performance of "(Don't Fear) The Reaper" with Ferrell playing cowbell.

At Ferrell's all-star cancer benefit concert Best Night of Your Life on October 6, 2018, Ferrell joined Coldplay's Chris Martin on cowbell for the song "Viva la Vida".

In the 2025 Peacock documentary SNL50: Beyond Saturday Night, the entire second episode was devoted to the "More Cowbell" skit. The creation and legacy of the skit is discussed from its conception until its live airing, featuring interviews with Fallon, Ferrell, Kattan and Parnell, as well as Rachel Dratch, Fred Armisen and the founding members of Blue Öyster Cult, while Red Hot Chili Peppers' drummer Chad Smith portrays Gene Frenkle in flashback clips of the character.

On May 16, 2026, host Ferrell played the cowbell during a post-broadcast performance of "Help!" with musical guest Paul McCartney for the SNL season 51 finale.

=== Other ===
The quote from Dickinson, "Guess what! I've got a fever, and the only prescription is more cowbell!" has become a legendary SNL quote, and is parodied, homaged, and referenced by many forms of media. The sketch was referenced on various episodes of SNL in subsequent years. Promotions for the April 5, 2008 Christopher Walken/Panic! at the Disco episode of Saturday Night Live referenced the "More Cowbell" sketch. The cowbell did not appear during the actual episode.

"(Don't Fear) The Reaper" is one of the songs included in the first Rock Band game; when the song is selected, several of its different loading screen messages reference the skit.

Ferrell claimed in 2019 that the "More Cowbell" sketch "ruined" Walken's life because Walken is best known by the general public for his role in this sketch.

In the 2016 film The Jungle Book, the character of King Louie, voiced by Christopher Walken, appears after Mowgli, played by Neel Sethi, shakes a cowbell.

In St. Charles, Missouri, a marathon/half marathon race is held annually called MO' Cowbell Run. The race name was inspired by the SNL sketch.

At Washington State University during their historic NCAA basketball tournament runs in 2007–2008, coached by Tony Bennett, power forward Robbie Cowgill prompted student section chants of "I've got a fever and the only prescription is more Cowgill." Los Angeles Angels and New York Mets outfielder Collin Cowgill was the subject of similar fan jokes.

Due to its long-running history with cowbells, Mississippi State University has adopted the skit as a part of its athletic teams' public image (particularly their football division), traditionally playing a clip of Dickinson's speech before home football games.

In The Lord of the Rings Online MMORPG, there is an item that can be used for music generation called the "Moor Cowbell".

Some Tesla automobiles feature some of the "More Cowbell" soundtrack when "Rainbow Road" is chosen from the Toybox options and autosteer is engaged.

The Ozark Mountain Daredevils released the digital single "More Cowbell" on all streaming platforms in June 2023.
