= Edith Crash =

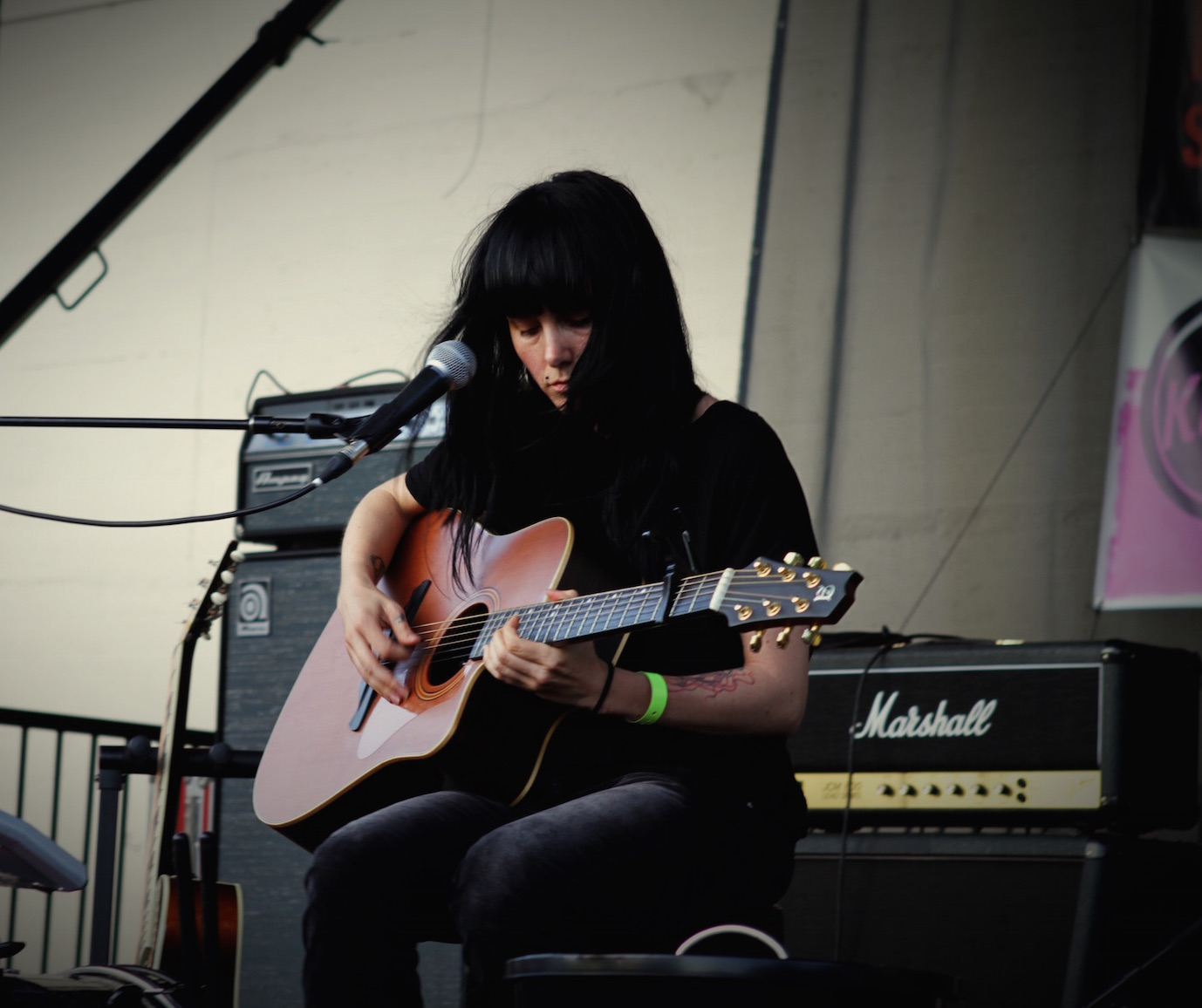
- Edith Crash performing Make Music Pasadena, 2014

Background information
- Born: 5 October 1983 (age 42); Perpignan, France
- Genres: Blues, Rock; Electronic
- Instruments: Vocals, guitar, drums
- Label: Light In The Attic Records
- Website: edithcrash.com

Edith Crash (born 5 October 1983 in Perpignan, France) is a French singer-songwriter, musician, producer and one woman band.

== Career ==
Edith Crash spent her teenage years in Spain before moving to Los Angeles. In 2015, she recorded her album Partir with producer Alain Johannes. The same year, her song "Casser" remixed by the Chilean musician Sokio was used in the movie Knock, Knock directed by Eli Roth and starring Keanu Reeves .

In February 2016 the prominent French magazine Rock & Folk gave four stars to her record 'Partir'. In 2016 Edith Crash performed at South by Southwest in Austin, Texas. She was featured on NPR as one of the favorite discoveries of the festival. The article describes her style as bluesy, folky, dark and strange.

In October 2019 Edith announces her new record "Frenzy" available from Light In The Attic Records. The album, was co-produced by Edith and Jeff Berner (Psychic TV), it includes collaborations with Alain Johannes and was mastered by Bernie Grundman. A music video directed by Vice Cooler was released for the song "Running". It was filmed in and around the venue The Smell in Downtown Los Angeles . Henry Rollins described "Frenzy" as a "Super cool album" and played several songs on his KCRW show.

== Live performances ==
Edith Crash performed at the Primavera Sound Festival in 2012, SXSW and Canadian Music Week in 2016, as well as at Lightning in a Bottle in 2017.

== Discography ==
- Des Mots – (2010)
- De L'Autre Côté – (2011)
- Inonde with Alex Augé – Vagueness Records (2012)
- Film Score – (2013)
- Cover Songs – (2013)
- Partir – (2015)
- Live 2016 – (2016)
- Frenzy – (2019)
- Home Concert 2020 – (2020)
