= Little Sister (Queens of the Stone Age song) =

Single by Queens of the Stone Age

from the album Lullabies to Paralyze
- Released: December 2004 (promotional); March 7, 2005 (commercial)
- Genre: Stoner rock; hard rock
- Length: 2:54
- Label: Interscope
- Songwriters: Joey Castillo; Joshua Homme; Troy Van Leeuwen
- Producers: Joe Barresi; Joshua Homme

Queens of the Stone Age singles chronology
"First It Giveth" (2003)	"Little Sister" (2004)	"In My Head" (2005)

"Little Sister" is the first single released by American rock band Queens of the Stone Age from their fourth album Lullabies to Paralyze. It was first issued as a promotional single in December 2004, but was later released as a commercial single on March 7, 2005. The song was recorded live in the studio in one take.

== Background ==
The song had been workshopped in various forms for several years before its official release. An early version was recorded with Dave Grohl in 2002 for the album Songs for the Deaf, but was scrapped. This unfinished recording was later distributed on a bootleg recording compilation.

According to Josh Homme, the song was inspired by the "sort of sexual twist" of the 1961 song of the same name by Mort Shuman and Doc Pomus, which was a major hit for Elvis Presley. Homme stated: "I like the amalgam of imagery that it puts forward, that throwing a little pebble at the girl's windows late at night, you know, trying to creep in the back door, you know. And I also love the Elvis song 'Little Sister' because I like the sort of sexual twist that's put on by 'little sister don't you do what your big sister done."

== Live performances ==
Queens of the Stone Age performed as musical guests for Saturday Night Live on May 14, 2005. When they performed "Little Sister" actor/comedian Will Ferrell came onstage and played with the band, performing on cowbell as fictional Blue Öyster Cult member Gene Frenkle. This was a reprise of the famous sketch from the year 2000, in which actor Christopher Walken performed as a music producer who demands "More cowbell!" during a studio recording of Blue Öyster Cult famous song, "(Don't Fear) The Reaper". The cowbell sound for "Little Sister" in fact made by a jam block, as seen on the music video for the song; however, drummer Jon Theodore has used a cowbell during live performances of the song since he joined in 2013.

Eddie Vedder has performed "Little Sister" as a guest with Queens of the Stone Age on two occasions, first in 2011 at his own PJ20 festival playing the jam block and again in 2013 at Lollapalooza Chile playing the cowbell. Vedder also provided backing vocals on both occasions.

== Reception ==
Louder Sound and Kerrang both named "Little Sister" the seventh-best Queens of the Stone Age song.

== Music video ==
The music video features the band playing in a dark room, with Josh Homme sporting a longer hair style, and girls dancing in the back behind a silhouette screen.

== Track listings ==
CD:

1. "Little Sister" (Album Version) - 2:57
2. "The Blood Is Love" (Contradictator Remix) - 5:24
3. "Little Sister" (CD-ROM video)

CD Maxi Single:

1. "Little Sister" (Album Version) - 2:57
2. "The Blood Is Love" (Contradictator Remix) - 5:24
3. "Little Sister" (Contradictator Remix) - 3:29

7" (Picture Disc):

1. "Little Sister" (Album Version) - 2:57
2. "Little Sister" (Contradictator Remix) - 3:29

== Personnel ==
- Josh Homme – vocals, lead guitar
- Joey Castillo – drums, percussion
- Alain Johannes – rhythm guitar
- Troy Van Leeuwen – bass

== Charts ==
=== Weekly charts ===
Weekly chart performance for "Little Sister"
Chart (2004–2005)	Peak position
Australia (ARIA)	40
Canada Rock Top 30 (Radio & Records)	5
Germany (GfK)	65
Ireland (IRMA)	34
Italy (FIMI)	40
Netherlands (Single Top 100)	55
Scottish Singles Sales (Official Charts)	16
UK Singles (Official Charts)	18
UK Rock & Metal (Official Charts)	2
US Billboard Hot 100	88
US Alternative Airplay (Billboard)	2
US Mainstream Rock (Billboard)	13

=== Year-end charts ===
Year-end chart performance for "Little Sister"
Chart (2005)	Position
US Modern Rock Tracks (Billboard)	13

== Certifications ==
Certifications for "Little Sister"
Region	Certification	Certified units/sales
New Zealand (RMNZ)	Gold	15,000^{‡}
United Kingdom (BPI)	Silver	200,000^{‡}
^{‡} Sales+streaming figures based on certification alone.
