= Over the Years and Through the Woods =

Live album / video by Queens of the Stone Age
- Released: November 22, 2005
- Recorded: 1998–2005
- Genre: Hard rock
- Length: 74:21 (CD)
- Label: Interscope
- Producers: Josh Homme, Randi Wilens

Queens of the Stone Age chronology
Lullabies to Paralyze (2005)	Over the Years and Through the Woods (2005)	Era Vulgaris (2007)

Professional ratings
Review scores
Source	Rating
AllMusic	4/5 stars
Pitchfork	7.6/10

Over the Years and Through the Woods is a live album and video by Queens of the Stone Age. The release features material on audio CD as well as video DVD—both recorded at London's Brixton Academy on Monday August 22, 2005 and KOKO on Tuesday August 23, 2005.

== Recording and release ==
Over the Years and Through the Woods is the first live release by the band, and is sold as two different packages—either a CD case or a DVD case. Both versions include the same content on the discs. The DVD content was directed by Chapman Baehler.

== Artwork ==
The cover art features an assortment of stylized letter Q's, which represent the band's studio albums released prior to Over the Years and Through the Woods. The blue, red and yellow 'Q' is taken from Rated R, Songs for the Deaf and Lullabies to Paralyze respectively. The band's cover logo is taken from their self-titled debut album.

== Track listing ==
=== Live CD ===
No.	Title	Writer(s)	Original album	Length
1.	"Go with the Flow"	Josh Homme, Nick Oliveri	Songs for the Deaf	2:58
2.	"Regular John"	Homme, Alfredo Hernández, John McBain	Queens of the Stone Age	5:24
3.	"Monsters In the Parasol"	Homme, Mario Lalli	Rated R	4:39
4.	"Tangled Up In Plaid"	Homme, Troy Van Leeuwen, Joey Castillo, Mark Lanegan	Lullabies to Paralyze	4:00
5.	"Little Sister"	Homme, Van Leeuwen, Castillo	Lullabies to Paralyze	2:51
6.	"You Can't Quit Me Baby"	Homme, Hernandez	Queens of the Stone Age	9:49
7.	"I Wanna Make It wit Chu"	Homme, Alain Johannes, Michael Melchiondo	Volumes 9 & 10	4:27
8.	"Leg of Lamb"	Homme, Oliveri	Rated R	3:34
9.	"I Think I Lost My Headache"	Homme, Oliveri	Rated R	5:24
10.	"Mexicola"	Homme	Queens of the Stone Age	5:24
11.	"Burn the Witch"	Homme, Van Leeuwen, Castillo	Lullabies to Paralyze	3:12
12.	"Song for the Dead"	Homme, Lanegan	Songs for the Deaf	7:47
13.	"No One Knows"	Homme, Lanegan	Songs for the Deaf	7:47
14.	"Long Slow Goodbye"	Homme, Van Leeuwen, Castillo, Lanegan	Lullabies to Paralyze	7:20

=== DVD ===
Featuring "Spiders and Vinegaroons" (from the Kyuss/Queens of the Stone Age split EP, 1997) on the title screen.

No.	Title	Writer(s)	Original album	Length
1.	"This Lullaby"	Homme, Van Leeuwen, Castillo	Lullabies to Paralyze	2:40
2.	"Go With the Flow"	Homme, Oliveri	Songs for the Deaf	3:12
3.	"Feel Good Hit of the Summer"	Homme, Oliveri	Rated R	3:41
4.	"The Lost Art of Keeping a Secret"	Homme, Oliveri	Rated R	3:44
5.	"Regular John"	Homme, Hernandez, McBain	Queens of the Stone Age	5:30
6.	"Song for the Deaf"	Homme, Lanegan, Oliveri	Songs for the Deaf	5:09
7.	"Avon"	Homme	Queens of the Stone Age	3:33
8.	"Little Sister"	Homme, Van Leeuwen, Castillo	Lullabies to Paralyze	2:52
9.	"You Can't Quit Me Baby"	Homme, Hernandez	Queens of the Stone Age	10:27
10.	"I Wanna Make It wit Chu"	Homme, Johannes, Melchiondo	Volumes 9 & 10	5:10
11.	"Monsters In the Parasol"	Homme, Lalli	Rated R	3:16
12.	"The Fun Machine Took a Shit & Died"	Homme, Chris Goss	Era Vulgaris	6:41
13.	"Mexicola"	Homme	Queens of the Stone Age	5:17
14.	"Burn the Witch"	Homme, Van Leeuwen, Castillo	Lullabies to Paralyze	4:37
15.	"Covered In Punk's Blood"	Homme	Volumes 9 & 10	1:57
16.	"I Think I Lost My Headache"	Homme, Oliveri	Rated R	5:07
17.	"Song for the Dead"	Homme, Lanegan	Songs for the Deaf	8:16
18.	"I Never Came"	Homme, Van Leeuwen, Castillo	Lullabies to Paralyze	5:54
19.	"No One Knows"	Homme, Lanegan	Songs for the Deaf	8:09
20.	"Long Slow Goodbye"	Homme, Van Leeuwen, Castillo, Lanegan	Lullabies to Paralyze	7:44

==== Bonus ====
There are 13 bonus songs, recorded at various locations during each of four tours, split into the following sections (all songs are taken from said album unless noted):

- Queens of the Stone Age
  - "The Bronze" – 3:38 (from The Split CD EP split with Beaver, 1998)
  - "Mexicola" – 5:34
- Rated R
  - "Better Living Through Chemistry" – 5:54
  - "Auto Pilot" – 4:19
  - "How to Handle a Rope" – 3:29 (from Queens of the Stone Age)
- Songs for the Deaf
  - "Quick and to the Pointless" – 1:34 (from Rated R)
  - "You Think I Ain't Worth a Dollar, But I Feel Like a Millionaire" – 2:36
  - "God is in the Radio" – 11:19
  - "Song for the Dead" – 6:09
  - "Regular John" – 2:02 (from Queens of the Stone Age)
  - "Hanging Tree" – 3:16
- Lullabies to Paralyze
  - "Precious and Grace" – 3:33
  - "Burn the Witch" – 2:41

== Personnel ==
Queens of the Stone Age

- Josh Homme – lead vocals, guitar, bass
- Troy Van Leeuwen – guitar, lap steel, bass, backing vocals
- Alain Johannes – bass, guitar, backing vocals
- Joey Castillo – drums
- Natasha Shneider – keyboards, backing vocals

Additional personnel

- Chapman Baehler – video director and director of photography
- Dan Hadley – light designer
- Patrick Hutchinson – front-of-house engineer
- Trina Shoemaker – mixing
- Phil Sisson – multi-track sound
- Kennie Takahashi – second mix and sound editing
- Christian Huwiler – drum technician
- Brett Selby and Rocky Robert – guitar technicians

== Notes ==
- The track "Spiders and Vinegaroons" from the 1997 split EP Kyuss/Queens of the Stone Age is played during the DVD's main menu.
- The song "The Fun Machine Took a Shit & Died" was initially slated to be included on Lullabies to Paralyze, but was misplaced. During that time, the band assumed that the tapes of the song were either lost or stolen. The song was later released as a single in June 2007.
- During every weekend in the month of November 2005, DirecTV aired an edited version of the main feature DVD content on their "freeview" channel to promote the DVD/CD release on November 22, 2005. The songs that were removed for time constraints were: "Feel Good Hit of the Summer", "The Lost Art of Keeping a Secret", "The Fun Machine Took a Shit and Died", "I Think I Lost My Headache" and "I Never Came". The edited version also censored some explicit language and brief nudity from the program.
- A hidden audio commentary can be enabled for the bonus footage. It features comments from the entire band (Josh Homme, Joey Castillo, Alain Johannes, Troy Van Leeuwen and Natasha Shneider) and was recorded on October 1, 2005 on the day of their performance as the opening act for Nine Inch Nails at the Hollywood Bowl. It is accessible by entering the Sound Options menu in the Bonus section and turning on the French subtitles, or by switching the audio track while watching the footage.
- Although credits for the bonus tracks were not included, two songs from the Rated R section ("Better Living Through Chemistry" and "Auto Pilot") were recorded at the Newport Music Hall in Columbus, Ohio on October 4, 2000 — not "somewhere in Europe" as surmised by Homme in the bonus clip commentary. These tracks were recorded and edited by Sie Callebs and John Waters.

== Charts ==
=== Album ===
Chart (2005)	Peak position
Belgian Albums (Ultratop Flanders)	69
German Albums (Offizielle Top 100)	100
Italian Albums (FIMI)	67
US Billboard 200	186

=== DVD ===
Chart (2005)	Peak position
Australian DVD Chart (ARIA Charts)	17

== Certifications ==
Region	Certification	Certified units/sales
Australia (ARIA)	Gold	7,500^{^}
^{^} Shipments figures based on certification alone.
