= Fififf Teeners =

American music duo

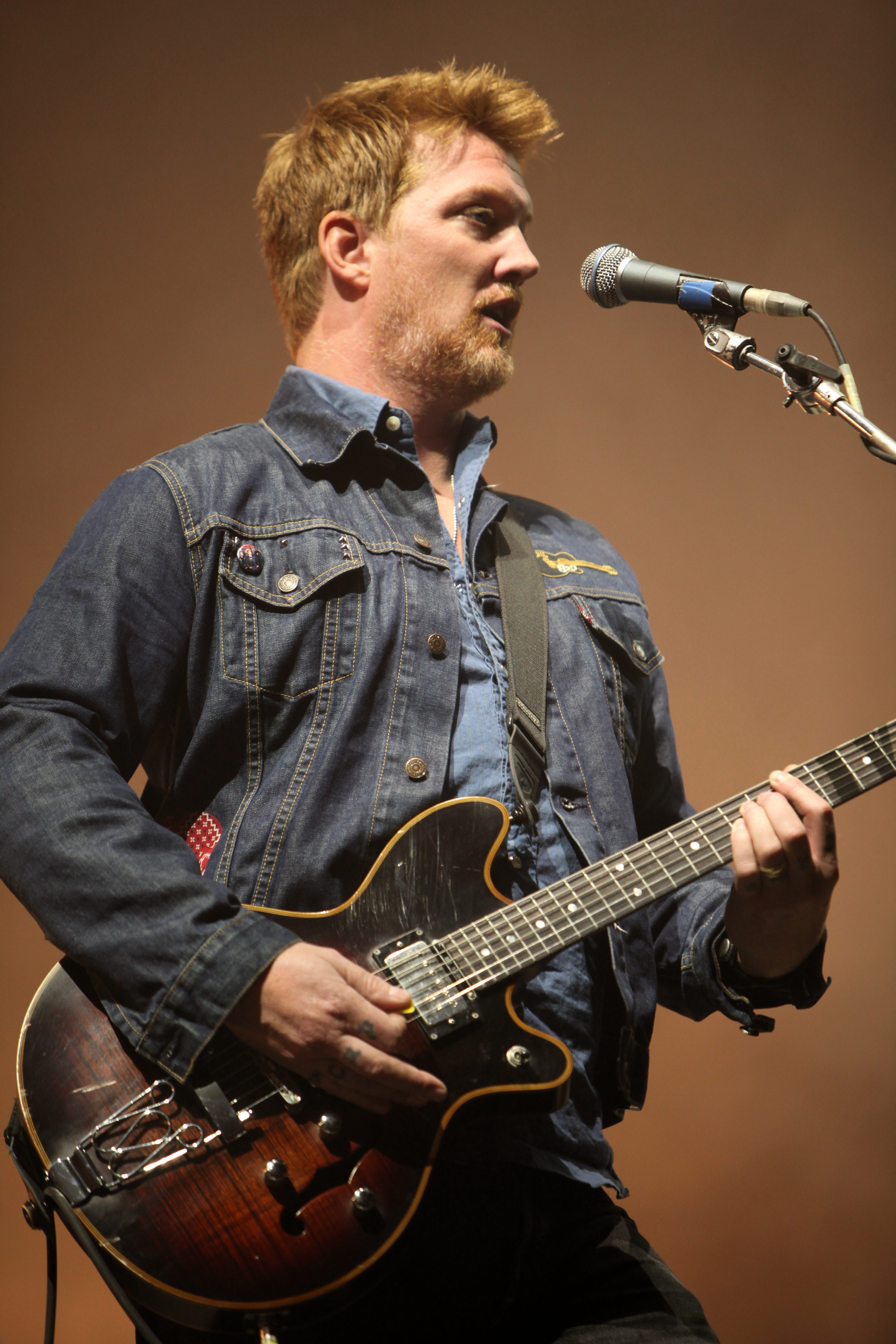
- Josh Homme performing in 2011

Background information
- Origin: Palm Desert, California, U.S.
- Genres: Hard rock
- Years active: 2000–present
- Members: Josh Homme; Chris Goss

Fififf Teeners (or The 5:15ers) is the name given to the side project of musicians Josh Homme and Chris Goss.

The alias of the duo was first used when they co-produced Queens of the Stone Age's Rated R, and again for the band's fifth studio album, Era Vulgaris. To date, the pair have only performed as the 5:15ers once, at the ArthurBall held at the Echoplex, a club in Echo Park, California. The set was a mix of tracks from both their respective careers, including a number of Masters of Reality songs, "100 Days" from Mark Lanegan's Bubblegum (Which both Goss and Homme contributed to) and "You Would Know" by Queens of the Stone Age. Another song played was a cover of "Space For Rent" by the Danish three-piece WhoMadeWho. The performance also included original work, with the song "Into the Hollow" later appearing on Era Vulgaris.

When asked in February 2007 about the future of the project, Goss answered, "There will be one show and more to follow. We're focusing on the show, but we have talked about doing a record". Despite this, nothing has come into fruition since. On the band's musical direction, Goss opined that "[It will be] something that's neither Masters of Reality or Queens of the Stone Age. This one will be more 'art fag.'"
