= Era Vulgaris (album) =

Studio album by Queens of the Stone Age
- Released: June 12, 2007
- Recorded: July 2006 – April 2007
- Studios: Cherokee (Los Angeles); Steakhouse (Studio City); Sound City (Van Nuys)
- Genres: Alternative rock; desert rock; garage rock; hard rock
- Length: 47:53
- Labels: Interscope; Rekords
- Producers: The Fififf Teeners (Chris Goss and Josh Homme)

Queens of the Stone Age chronology
Over the Years and Through the Woods (2005)	Era Vulgaris (2007)	...Like Clockwork (2013)

Singles from Era Vulgaris
- 1. "Sick, Sick, Sick" Released: May 8, 2007; 2. "3's & 7's" Released: June 4, 2007; 3. "Make It wit Chu" Released: October 2007

Era Vulgaris is the fifth studio album by American rock band Queens of the Stone Age. It was released on June 12, 2007, through Interscope Records, as their last album on the label. Recorded from July 2006 to April 2007, it was preceded by the singles "Sick, Sick, Sick" in May, followed by "3's & 7's" in early June. "Make It wit Chu" was released as the third single in October. The album debuted at No. 14 on the U.S. Billboard 200 charts, selling 52,000 copies in its first week. It reached top ten positions in other countries, such as No. 7 in the UK, No. 5 in Canada, and No. 4 in Australia.

== Overview and background ==
While 2002's Songs for the Deaf was said to be inspired by frontman Josh Homme's tedious drives through the Southern Californian desert, the inspiration for Era Vulgaris came from his daily drives through Hollywood. He described the record as "dark, hard, and electrical, sort of like a construction worker" and said "it's like dirt, clearly seen". The album's title refers to the Latin term for Common Era. The title was chosen by Homme because he thought "it sounds like 'the Vulgar Era', which I like, because that sounds like something that I would like to be part of... I mean I think we're in it, and I'm stoked". Two tracks from the album had previously been released or performed elsewhere. "Into the Hollow" had been performed by Homme and Chris Goss as The Fififf Teeners (with the two also producing Era Vulgaris), and "Make It wit Chu" had been recorded as a Desert Sessions track, as well as appearing on the live album Over the Years and Through the Woods.

== Production ==
=== Pre-production speculation and contributors ===
In June 2006, in an interview on the Australian radio station Triple J, bassist Jesse F. Keeler from Death from Above 1979 revealed that he would be playing bass on an upcoming Queens of the Stone Age album, but that he would more than likely not be touring with the band due to his desire to spend more time with his girlfriend. Eventually, on his band's internet forum, Keeler revealed that he would not be appearing on the album due to conflicting schedules. In a July interview with NME, Homme confirmed that the band was back in the studio and writing, but he remained unwilling to reveal who would appear in the band on the new record, stating, "That's not a healthy question. You'll ruin the surprise. We've gotta keep our cool." The album was expected to include guest performances by Trent Reznor, Julian Casablancas, Mark Lanegan, Billy Gibbons, and (jokingly) deceased humorist Erma Bombeck. Of these, however, only Casablancas' and Lanegan's tracks appear on the U.S. release: Casablancas performed synth guitar and backing vocals on "Sick, Sick, Sick", while Lanegan sang backing vocals on "River in the Road". Scheduling conflicts prevented Gibbons from appearing on the record, while the album's title track (featuring Reznor) was released separately on the You Know What You Did promotional CD and the UK edition of the album.

=== Recording ===
The album was recorded with "exactly zero input from [record label] Interscope Records" between July 2006 and April 2007 at Cherokee Studios in Hollywood, Steakhouse Studios in Los Angeles, and Sound City Studios in Van Nuys. It was mixed at Bay 7 Studios in North Hollywood. The album was recorded and mixed by Alain Johannes, and produced by Josh Homme and Chris Goss under the name The Fififf Teeners. The primary contributors to the recording were Homme, Troy van Leeuwen, Joey Castillo, Johannes, and Goss.

In an interview with SuicideGirls on June 16, 2007, Van Leeuwen said, "We basically started a year ago. And like I said, we didn't really have anything written. So it was a long process. It was the longest I've ever taken to make a record, frankly. I've made records over the process of a year but this was the first time it's ever been my total focus for that long. This was the first time I've ever done that... total focus for 10 months."

Goss and Johannes were replaced by Dean Fertita (keyboard) and Michael Shuman (bass) for later bonus track recordings and the subsequent supporting tour. Regarding the band's line-up changes for Era Vulgaris, Homme commented, "I like combinations that no one would expect... it's the cool part of any surprise party."

== Musical style and influences ==
"3's & 7's"
The opening of the album's lead single for most of the world.

Era Vulgaris displays influences from many different genres. The album departs from the softer, hollow-body guitar sound of their previous album Lullabies to Paralyze with heavy, crunchy guitars and some electronic influences. Rolling Stone noted the influence of Gary Numan "all over this record". Musically, the album has been described as "brand new retro", a fusion of "punk, rock, blues, and southern grit" (in an FHM review), and slower, moodier, and groggier than the band's previous efforts.

== Marketing and promotion ==
=== Behind the scenes and promotional contest ===
Cover of You Know What You Did

Shortly after the album's announcement in February 2007, a video was posted on the band's official website showing Homme, Castillo, and Van Leeuwen jamming. Along with brief footage of the recording session for "Misfit Love", the last six or seven seconds of the video contained footage of the recording of "3's & 7's" accompanied by studio-mastered audio. A second video of the recording of the album surfaced subsequently on YouTube, depicting the band (this time including Johannes) recording a new track, "Turning on the Screw", in the studio.

In early April, the band's website was updated with a 37-second excerpt from "Sick, Sick, Sick". This was replaced by the song "3's and 7's" in its entirety, which was later removed. Fan site thefade.net announced a promotional contest for fans to win a "special package" from the band, confirmed as legitimate by the band's webmaster. On April 13, packages were sent to selected winners containing a CD entitled You Know What You Did with the sole track "Era Vulgaris", which Homme confirmed would not be appearing on the record despite being the title track, although it was included as a bonus track on the UK edition.

The CD was accompanied by a handwritten letter asking fans to share the song in any way possible:

Hello friend -

Thank you for accepting this gift. Included you will find the will to dance & the song ERA VULGARIS. It was pulled from the new album (of the same name) so that it could be to you and become an example of how we think "from now on" should be. As in - We do for you, you do for us.

So to start this relationship off, we have done for you. Now we ask this in return. Share this with friends you think we (you & us) would enjoy. Upload it and spray it like time released graffitti (sic) on the websites of places it does not belong.

Is it a new recipe on Rachel Ray's site? Is it a new Nickelback song on their board? A secret Gov't document? Video game cheats? Sex site password? Fuckin' whatever? You decide. Then tell us how you shoved this song into the guts of the internet & we (both) can smile wide with pride at our new relationship.

OH, but not till after midnight tonight... from now till then, is just for us. Can we trust you to wait? Relationships are built on trust. Enjoy!

- 'Dr Insider & QOTSA'

The song "The Fun Machine Took a Shit & Died" was recorded for a CD single released with pre-ordered copies of the album at Insound.com and Newbury Comics, and it later appeared as a bonus track on the Brazilian, German, and Japanese editions of the album.

=== Bulby, Xfm and soundtracks ===
We're making these mock commercials for the new record. Josh was talking about this kind of naïve point in time when TV and commercials kicked in with cartoon characters selling cigarettes and stuff like that. Like Fred Flintstone buying Camels. So we decided to invent a character called Bulby to sell our new record.

— Troy Van Leeuwen interview with SuicideGirls

The full track "Sick, Sick, Sick" was leaked online, countered by the posting of a promotional video to the band's site featuring a "sales pitch" for Era Vulgaris by two anthropomorphic lightbulbs, followed by an official streaming of "Sick, Sick, Sick" with lyrics displayed in the background.

On May 2, 2007, Homme, Van Leeuwen, and new band member Dean Fertita appeared on London radio station Xfm, performing an acoustic set that included the tracks "3's & 7's", "Into the Hollow", and "Suture Up Your Future".

It was announced that songs would appear in the video games Madden NFL 08, Guitar Hero III: Legends of Rock, and Rock Band, specifically that the track "3's & 7's" would be featured in Madden NFL 08 and Guitar Hero III: Legends of Rock. Both "3's & 7's" and "Sick, Sick, Sick" are available as downloadable content on Rock Band and Rock Band 2. In addition, "Make It wit Chu" was later included in Guitar Hero 5.

== Artwork ==
Stumpy the Pirate, one of several characters created to promote the album.

The album's cover features the two lightbulbs from the promotional video, Bulby and his pirate accomplice (pictured right), marking a change from the plainer designs of the bands' previous albums. According to Homme, the light bulb represented "…what you perceive to be a great idea that really is not that great of an idea". The cover was a slip of paper, with a simplified credits page on the back side, marked with the outline of the record. The typography follows an Old English style font; Blackmoor, with the 'Spermy Q' seen on their album Songs for the Deaf.

An art booklet was also included, featuring "Bulby" and several other characters which unfolded to display a pin-up advertisement for the album, following the 1950s advertising satire as the rest of the album art followed. The lack of liner notes for the album was remedied when the official website allowed users to view an e-booklet, containing more detailed liner notes, lyrics, and previously unseen artwork. The green light bulb with the pirate hat, eye patch and peg leg is known as "Stumpy".

Some copies of the album cover contain a red and yellow rectangle spoofing the Parental Advisory seal, reading "Rental Advisory: Freedom Not for Purchase". Coincidentally, it was the first Queens of the Stone Age album since Rated R to not bear a genuine Parental Advisory seal.

The lightbulb characters were created by Morning Breath Inc. with overall art direction from Jason Noto and Doug Cunningham of Morning Breath Inc.

== Reception ==
Professional ratings
Aggregate scores
Source	Rating
Metacritic	75/100
Review scores
Source	Rating
AllMusic	4/5 stars
The A.V. Club	B+
Entertainment Weekly	C+
The Guardian	2/5 stars
Los Angeles Times	3/4 stars
NME	8/10
Pitchfork	6.2/10
Rolling Stone	4/5 stars
Spin	4.5/5 stars
Uncut	4/5 stars

Reviews for the album were generally positive with a rating of 75 out of 100 on Metacritic, a decline from their previous two studio albums. Uncut and Allmusic's reviews were particularly glowing, with the latter noting how Era Vulgaris is "as different from Lullabies as that was to their dramatic widescreen breakthrough, Songs for the Deaf". Originally awarding the album with a four-and-a-half star rating, Allmusic changed this to a four-star rating in 2013 upon the release of the band's follow-up ...Like Clockwork.

The Observer also commented on the album's change in direction, commenting that the band had "turned its back on the mainstream" and that the album was "uneasy and brooding" and "gripping stuff". Rolling Stone gave the album four stars for the first time since the band's self titled debut, commenting that "Era Vulgaris is Homme's fifth Queens album, and like the others, it's intricately crafted, meticulously polished and ruthlessly efficient in its pursuit of depraved rock thrills." Critic Jon Pareles of The New York Times selected the album as the tenth best release of 2007.

A number of reviews were negative, however; Q magazine gave the album two stars out of five, while The Village Voice criticized Homme for lack of originality, describing the record's sound as "listless and drained of ideas". The Guardian slated the record as lyrically clichéd and lacking the input of former bassist Nick Oliveri, and Entertainment Weekly delivered the closing indictment that "there isn't a single song here that you'll remember, or want to return to, two summers hence."

Era Vulgaris had sold 198,000 copies in the US, and 521,000 copies worldwide before falling off the charts. The US sales are a decline from their previous album, as Lullabies to Paralyze had sold 342,000 copies in the US by March 2007. Neither album achieved the commercial success of the band's 2002 release, Songs for the Deaf, which had sold 986,000 copies in the US alone as of June 2007.

== Track listing ==
All tracks are written by Josh Homme, Troy Van Leeuwen, and Joey Castillo, except where noted.

No.	Title	Writer(s)	Length
1.	"Turnin' on the Screw"		5:20
2.	"Sick, Sick, Sick"	Homme, Van Leeuwen, Castillo, Chris Goss	3:34
3.	"I'm Designer"		4:04
4.	"Into the Hollow"		3:42
5.	"Misfit Love"		5:39
6.	"Battery Acid"		4:06
7.	"Make It wit Chu"	Homme, Alain Johannes, Michael Melchiondo	4:50
8.	"3's & 7's"		3:34
9.	"Suture Up Your Future"		4:37
10.	"River in the Road"		3:19
11.	"Run, Pig, Run"		4:40
Total length:			47:24

Vinyl/iTunes bonus track
No.	Title	Length
12.	"Running Joke"	2:54

Best Buy bonus track
No.	Title	Length
12.	"White Wedding" (Billy Idol cover)	3:48

Circuit City bonus track
No.	Title	Length
12.	"I'm Designer" (Hot Chip Remix)	6:28

f.y.e. bonus track
No.	Title	Length
12.	"Goin' Out West" (Tom Waits cover)	3:24

Argentina/Brazil/Germany/Netherlands/Mexico/Russia bonus track
No.	Title	Length
12.	"The Fun Machine Took a Shit & Died"	6:55

Australia/New Zealand/UK bonus tracks
No.	Title	Length
12.	"Running Joke"	2:54
13.	"Era Vulgaris" (featuring Trent Reznor)	4:20

Japan bonus tracks
No.	Title	Length
12.	"Running Joke"	2:54
13.	"Era Vulgaris" (featuring Trent Reznor)	4:20
14.	"The Fun Machine Took a Shit & Died"	6:55

Tour edition
No.	Title	Length
12.	"The Fun Machine Took a Shit and Died"	6:57
13.	"Make It wit Chu" (acoustic)	4:50
14.	"Era Vulgaris" (Richard File Remix) (featuring Trent Reznor)	6:06
15.	"I'm Designer" (Unkle Remix)	6:11

Canadian tour limited edition
No.	Title	Length
12.	"Christian Brothers" (Elliott Smith cover)	4:24
13.	"Needles in the Camel's Eye" (Brian Eno cover)	3:22
14.	"Make It wit Chu" (acoustic)	4:50
15.	"White Wedding" (Billy Idol cover)	3:51
16.	"Era Vulgaris" (Richard File Remix) (featuring Trent Reznor)	6:06

Disc 2 – Live in Amsterdam (Paradiso, 3 July 2007)
No.	Title	Length
1.	"Monsters in the Parasol"	3:34
2.	"Misfit Love"	6:41
3.	"If Only"	3:43
4.	"I Think I Lost My Headache"	6:10
5.	"Into the Hollow"	4:13
6.	"Go with the Flow"	3:22
7.	"Regular John"	10:59
8.	"Avon"	3:18
9.	"Song for the Dead"	7:13

== Personnel ==
According to the album liner notes, the contributors were as follows:

=== Queens of the Stone Age ===
- Josh Homme – lead vocals, guitar, backing vocals, lead guitar (tracks 1, 3, 7, and 8), acoustic guitar ("Battery Acid"), percussion ("Turnin' on the Screw"), bass guitar (tracks 4, 5, 6, 8, 9, 10, and 11), lap steel guitar ("Into the Hollow"), keyboard ("Into the Hollow"), electric piano (tracks 8 and 9), Rhodes piano ("Make It wit Chu"), "badly tuned" piano ("Run, Pig, Run"), organ ("River in the Road"), "percussion ball" ("Run, Pig, Run")
- Troy Van Leeuwen – guitar (tracks 1, 2, 3, 4, 7, 8, and 11), lead guitar (tracks 5, 6, and 9), keyboard (tracks 1, 2, 5, and 6), "crazy delay" guitar ("River in the Road"), lap steel guitar ("3's & 7's"), backing vocals (tracks 1, 2, 6, and 7), bass (tracks 2 and 7), "the percussion part that's a bitch" ("Turnin' on the Screw"), Moog ("I'm Designer"), Rhodes piano ("Into the Hollow")
- Joey Castillo – drums, percussion (tracks 1 and 7), "percussion ball" ("Run, Pig, Run")

=== Guest appearances ===
- Chris Goss – keyboard ("Into the Hollow"), "the chicken pluckin' guitar" ("Turnin' on the Screw"), "twinkley bits" ("Sick, Sick, Sick"), organ ("Misfit Love"), electric piano ("Suture Up Your Future"), "eclectic piano" ("Battery Acid"), bass ("River in the Road"), backing vocals (tracks 7 and 11)
- Alain Johannes – bass guitar (tracks 1 and 3), acoustic guitar ("Run, Pig, Run"), counterpoint guitar ("Misfit Love"), harmonic guitar ("Make It wit Chu"), counterpoint fiddle ("Misfit Love"), "cig" fiddle ("Run, Pig, Run"), marxophone ("Run, Pig, Run"), backing vocals ("Run, Pig, Run")
- Julian Casablancas – synth guitar and vocals ("Sick, Sick, Sick")
- Serrina Sims – backing vocals ("Make It wit Chu")
- Brody Dalle-Homme – backing vocals ("Make It wit Chu")
- Liam Lynch – backing vocals ("Make It wit Chu")
- Mark Lanegan – harmony vocals ("River in the Road")
- Trent Reznor – co-lead vocals ("Era Vulgaris")

=== Technical ===
- Chris Goss & Josh Homme (as The Fififf Teeners) − producers
- Alain Johannes − engineering and mixing
- Joe Barresi − mixing
- Justin Smith − mixing assistant
- Stephen Marcussen − mastering
- Jason Noto − design, illustrations
- Assistant Engineers – Cherokee studios (Ian Page, Todd Brohdy).

== Charts ==
=== Weekly charts ===
Chart (2007)	Peak position
Australian Albums (ARIA)	4
Austrian Albums (Ö3 Austria)	4
Belgian Albums (Ultratop Flanders)	2
Belgian Albums (Ultratop Wallonia)	29
Canadian Albums (Billboard)	5
Danish Albums (Hitlisten)	8
Dutch Albums (Album Top 100)	7
Finnish Albums (Suomen virallinen lista)	6
French Albums (SNEP)	22
German Albums (Offizielle Top 100)	5
Irish Albums (IRMA)	6
Italian Albums (FIMI)	28
Mexican Albums (Top 100 Mexico)	89
New Zealand Albums (RMNZ)	4
Norwegian Albums (VG-lista)	5
Portuguese Albums (AFP)	27
Scottish Albums (Official Charts)	4
Spanish Albums (Promusicae)	65
Swedish Albums (Sverigetopplistan)	6
Swiss Albums (Schweizer Hitparade)	4
UK Albums (OCC)	7
UK Rock & Metal Albums (Official Charts)	2
US Billboard 200	14
US Top Rock Albums (Billboard)	5

=== Year-end charts ===
Chart (2007)	Position
Belgian Albums (Ultratop Flanders)	49

=== Certifications ===
Region	Certification	Certified units/sales
Canada (Music Canada)	Gold	50,000^{^}
United Kingdom (BPI)	Gold	100,000^{^}
^{^} Shipments figures based on certification alone.

=== Singles chart positions ===
Single	Chart (2007)	Peak position
"Sick, Sick, Sick"	U.S. Modern Rock	23
"Sick, Sick, Sick"	U.S. Mainstream Rock	37
"Sick, Sick, Sick"	UK Singles Chart	65
"3's & 7's"	Eurochart Hot 100 Singles	85
"3's & 7's"	UK Singles Chart	19
"3's & 7's"	UK Rock Singles Chart	1
"3's & 7's"	U.S. Modern Rock	25
"Make It wit Chu"	Canadian Hot 100	43
"Make It wit Chu"	German Singles Chart (Gfk)	90
