= Lullabies to Paralyze =

Studio album by Queens of the Stone Age
- Released: March 22, 2005
- Recorded: May – July 2004
- Studio: Sound City (Van Nuys)
- Genres: Stoner rock; alternative rock
- Length: 59:26
- Label: Interscope
- Producers: Joe Barresi; Josh Homme

Queens of the Stone Age chronology
Stone Age Complication (2004)	Lullabies to Paralyze (2005)	Over the Years and Through the Woods (2005)

Alternative cover
- Cover of the LP release

Singles from Lullabies to Paralyze
- 1. "Little Sister" Released: December 2004; 2. "In My Head" Released: June 27, 2005; 3. "Burn the Witch" Released: January 10, 2006

Lullabies to Paralyze is the fourth studio album by American rock band Queens of the Stone Age, released on March 22, 2005. The album debuted at number five on the Billboard 200, and sold 97,000 copies in America during its first week of release, eventually topping over 342,000 copies as of March, 2007 according to Nielsen Soundscan. The album has been certified gold in the UK, where it has sold over 100,000 units. It is also the band's first album to be released after bassist Nick Oliveri was fired from the band. Singer/guitarist Josh Homme and singer Mark Lanegan are the only members from the previous album, Songs for the Deaf, to play on this album, with Lullabies to Paralyze being the last Queens of the Stone Age album with Lanegan as an official member. It is the first album to feature drummer Joey Castillo and guitarist Troy Van Leeuwen.

== Background ==
The album title Lullabies to Paralyze was intended to bridge Lullabies with its predecessor Songs for the Deaf by naming it after a line in "Mosquito Song", the final, hidden track on Songs for the Deaf. The "deluxe limited edition" of the album includes a bonus track and a bonus DVD containing "a look behind the scenes and special bonus footage". Videos were produced for singles "Little Sister", "In My Head" and "Burn the Witch", and the song "Someone's in the Wolf". The video for "Someone's in the Wolf" was featured on the bonus DVD of Lullabies to Paralyze.

The album was delayed during 2004 because of some changes to the line-up: bassist, vocalist, and co-songwriter Nick Oliveri was fired and on-off vocalist Mark Lanegan went on tour with his own band. Lanegan can still be heard singing on several songs of the album; he also contributed lyrics. Because of this turmoil, there had been rumours that Lanegan had left the band, which Josh Homme eventually clarified in several interviews was never the case. Nevertheless, he encouraged these rumours to draw the attention off the band by giving the press "something to focus on while I was just making the record".

And at the time, I was like, "Fuck, no one's even listening to this. It's too much about other stuff." And it would have been easy to make Songs for the Deaf 2, which is basically all I heard in my own head. But I can't do that. You've got to shake all that shit away.

— Josh Homme, Pitchfork interview, April 13, 2007

=== LP versions ===
The album has three LP pressing runs. The first pressing was released by AntAcidAudio and contains a different cover to the CD version. The sides are named Once, You, Were & Lost, after a line from "Someone's in the Wolf", with each containing a mixture of the CD's album and bonus tracks (with the exception of Once, only the standard tracks are present).

The second pressing is a reissue by Dutch record label Music On Vinyl, released on September 22, 2011. The reissue is different from the first pressing in that it does not have its sides named after the line from "Someone's in the Wolf," and it uses the cover art from the CD release. The reissue omitted bonus tracks "Infinity" and "Precious and Grace" from the track listing, and listed "Like a Drug" as the last track. Side four contains an etching of one of the album's artwork.

The third pressing was released in November 2019 and features the tracklist from the original 2005 LP release and the cover art from the original CD release.

== Critical reception ==
Professional ratings
Aggregate scores
Source	Rating
Metacritic	78/100
Review scores
Source	Rating
AllMusic	4.5/5 stars
Entertainment Weekly	B
The Guardian	4/5 stars
Los Angeles Times	4/4 stars
NME	8/10
Pitchfork	7.5/10
Q	4/5 stars
Rolling Stone	3/5 stars
Spin	B
Uncut	4/5 stars

"Little Sister"
Little sister audio sample

The album received generally positive reviews, although slightly lower than its predecessor, the average score being 78 out of 100 on Metacritic based on 31 professional reviews.

Kevin Forest Moreau awarded it 3rd best album of the year 2005, Billboard magazine ranked it 7th best album, Magnet magazine ranked it 9th, and Filter magazine considered it 10th best album of the year 2005. JustPressPlay ranked it number 31 on its list of the Top 100 Albums of the 2000s and named "Tangled Up in Plaid" the 19th best song of the decade.

== Commercial performance ==
Lullabies to Paralyze peaked at number four on the UK Albums Chart and was certified gold in the UK on April 15, 2005 with sales exceeding 100,000 copies. It also became the band's first album to reach the top ten on the US Billboard 200, where it peaked at number five.

== Track listing ==
All lyrics are written by Josh Homme, except where noted; all music is composed by Homme, Troy Van Leeuwen, and Joey Castillo, except where noted.

No.	Title	Lyrics	Music	Length
1.	"This Lullaby"			1:22
2.	"Medication"	Homme; Mark Lanegan		1:54
3.	"Everybody Knows That You Are Insane"			4:14
4.	"Tangled Up in Plaid"	Homme; Lanegan		4:13
5.	"Burn the Witch"			3:35
6.	"In My Head"		Homme; Van Leeuwen; Josh Freese; Castillo; Alain Johannes	4:01
7.	"Little Sister"			2:54
8.	"I Never Came"			4:48
9.	"Someone's in the Wolf"			7:15
10.	"The Blood Is Love"			6:37
11.	"Skin on Skin"			3:42
12.	"Broken Box"			3:02
13.	"You Got a Killer Scene There, Man..."			4:56
14.	"Long Slow Goodbye" (Includes a "Hidden Outro" which comes up at 5:16)	Homme; Lanegan		6:50
Total length:				59:26

Deluxe edition
No.	Title	Length
15.	"Like a Drug"	3:15

UK bonus tracks
No.	Title	Length
15.	"Like a Drug"	3:16
16.	"Precious and Grace" (ZZ Top cover)	3:23

Japanese edition bonus tracks
No.	Title	Length
15.	"Like a Drug"	3:15
16.	"Precious and Grace" (ZZ Top cover)	3:23
17.	"Infinity"	3:59

Bonus DVD
No.	Title	Length
1.	"The Way Finds You" (DVD-Video)	27:20
2.	"Someone's in the Wolf" (DVD-Video)	7:24
3.	"Josh's Session" (DVD-Video)	10:24

Limited Tour Edition Bonus UK CD (listed in the liner notes as "Live from Earthlink in Atlanta, GA March 19, 2005" but the songs are actually from the 9:30 Club in Washington, DC March 27, 2005)
No.	Title	Length
1.	"The Lost Art of Keeping a Secret"	3:54
2.	"Little Sister"	2:56
3.	"In My Head"	3:56
4.	"No One Knows"	6:48
5.	"Song for the Dead"	6:24
6.	"Regular John"	9:48

AntAcidAudio LP track listing
No.	Title	Vinyl side	Length
1.	"Lullaby"	Once	1:22
2.	"Medication"	Once	1:54
3.	"Everybody Knows That You Are Insane"	Once	4:14
4.	"Tangled Up in Plaid"	Once	4:13
5.	"Burn the Witch"	Once	3:35
6.	"In My Head"	You	4:01
7.	"Little Sister"	You	2:54
8.	"I Never Came"	You	4:48
9.	"Someone's in the Wolf"	You	7:16
10.	"Infinity"	Were	3:59
11.	"The Blood Is Love"	Were	6:38
12.	"Like a Drug"	Were	3:18
13.	"Skin on Skin"	Were	3:43
14.	"Broken Box"	Lost	3:00
15.	"Precious and Grace" (ZZ Top cover)	Lost	3:24
16.	""You Got a Killer Scene There, Man...""	Lost	4:58
17.	"Long Slow Goodbye" (Includes a "Hidden Outro" which comes up at 5:16)	Lost	6:54

=== Notes ===
- The "Hidden Outro" later appears as the main riff in the song "Running Joke", a b-side that appears on Era Vulgaris.
- The final item on the track list, "The Fun Machine Took a Shit and Died" (located behind the CD in the normal version, or inside the booklet in the deluxe edition), below "Long Slow Goodbye" reads; "The Fun Machine took a shit and died – Was lost or misplaced. (There is a reward for the return of said tapes)". During that time, the band assumed that the tapes of that song were either lost or stolen. A live version of this song can be found on the DVD release Over the Years and Through the Woods. Homme commented, "The tapes got lost. Actually, they were just at another studio, but we falsely accused everyone in the world of theft." The song was later rerecorded as a single and featured as a bonus track on Era Vulgaris.

== Personnel ==
=== Queens of the Stone Age ===
- Josh Homme – lead vocals (all but 1), guitar (all but 6), bass (5, 6, 8 (chorus), 12–14), piano (12), drums (8, 12), percussion (8, 10, 12), handclaps (13), whispers (1)
- Troy Van Leeuwen – guitar (4, 6, 9, 11–14), bass (2, 7, 8, 11), lap steel (2, 3, 5, 9, 10, 11, 14), piano (4), keyboards (11), handclaps (13), backing vocals (6)
- Alain Johannes – guitar (5–7, 11), bass (3, 4, 9, 10), flute & marxophone (9), backing vocals (12), phone (14)
- Mark Lanegan – lead vocals (1), co-lead vocals ("Precious and Grace"), backing vocals (5, 13)
- Joey Castillo – drums (all but 1), piano (6, 8, 14), percussion (3, 6, 8, 10, 12, 14), handclaps (13)

=== Guest appearances ===
- Chris Goss – backing vocals on "You Got a Killer Scene There Man...", "Someone's in the Wolf" and "Burn the Witch"
- Billy Gibbons – guitar and backing vocals on "Burn the Witch", guitar and co-lead vocals "Precious and Grace", guitar on "Like a Drug"
- Dave Catching – opening guitar on "The Blood Is Love"
- Jack Black – handclaps and stomps on "Burn the Witch", and is also seen contributing the same for "Broken Box" during the bonus DVD
- Jesse Hughes – flute on "Someone's in the Wolf"
- Shirley Manson – backing vocals on "You Got a Killer Scene There, Man..."
- Brody Dalle – backing vocals on "You Got a Killer Scene There, Man..."
- Joe Barresi – triangle on "Tangled Up in Plaid"
- The Main Street Horns – tubas and baritone trombone on "I Never Came", "Someone's in the Wolf" and "Skin on Skin"

== Charts and certifications ==
=== Weekly charts ===
Chart (2005)	Peak position
Australian Albums (ARIA)	2
Austrian Albums (Ö3 Austria)	5
Belgian Albums (Ultratop Flanders)	2
Belgian Albums (Ultratop Wallonia)	17
Canadian Albums (Billboard)	5
Danish Albums (Hitlisten)	12
Dutch Albums (Album Top 100)	4
Finnish Albums (Suomen virallinen lista)	8
French Albums (SNEP)	10
German Albums (Offizielle Top 100)	8
Irish Albums (IRMA)	2
Italian Albums (FIMI)	19
New Zealand Albums (RMNZ)	6
Norwegian Albums (VG-lista)	1
Portuguese Albums (AFP)	16
Scottish Albums (Official Charts)	3
Spanish Albums (Promusicae)	64
Swedish Albums (Sverigetopplistan)	2
Swiss Albums (Schweizer Hitparade)	4
UK Albums (OCC)	4
UK Rock & Metal Albums (Official Charts)	1
US Billboard 200	5

=== Year-end charts ===
Chart (2005)	Position
Australian Albums (ARIA)	76
Belgian Albums (Ultratop Flanders)	31
Dutch Albums (Album Top 100)	98

=== Certifications ===
Region	Certification	Certified units/sales
Australia (ARIA)	Gold	35,000^{^}
Belgium (BRMA)	Gold	25,000^{*}
Canada (Music Canada)	Gold	50,000^{^}
Germany (BVMI)	Gold	100,000^{‡}
New Zealand (RMNZ)	Gold	7,500^{^}
United Kingdom (BPI)	Gold	100,000^{^}
^{*} Sales figures based on certification alone.^{^} Shipments figures based on certification alone.^{‡} Sales+streaming figures based on certification alone.

=== Singles charts ===
Year	Single	Chart	Peak position
2005	"Little Sister"	US Billboard Hot 100	88
2005	"Little Sister"	US Modern Rock	2
2005	"Little Sister"	US Mainstream Rock	13
2005	"Little Sister"	UK Singles Chart	18
2005	"In My Head"	US Modern Rock	32
2005	"In My Head"	UK Singles Chart	44
2005	"Burn the Witch"	US Modern Rock	40
