= Jam block =

Modern percussion instrument

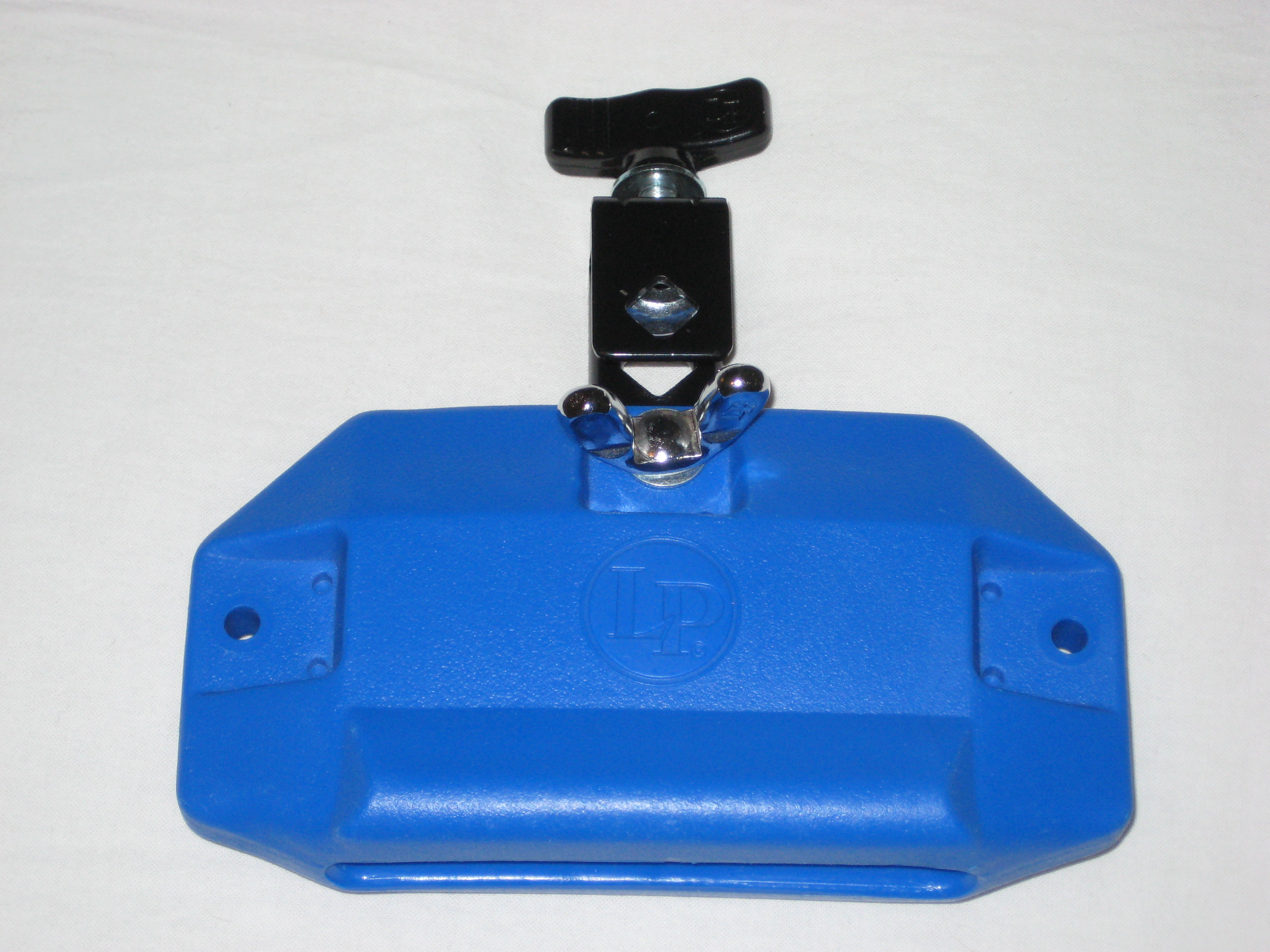

Percussion instrument
- Other names: Gock block; blast block
- Classification: Percussion
- Hornbostel–Sachs classification: 111.242.1 (Individual bells)
- Inventor: Martin Cohen

Related instruments
- Woodblock; temple blocks; muyu; slit drum

Builders
- Latin Percussion; Pearl; Meinl

A jam block is a percussion instrument developed as a modern, hard plastic version of the woodblock. They are popularly used for their durability when compared to the traditional woodblock. They were created by Martin Cohen, founder of Latin Percussion, after percussionist Marc Quiñones requested a sturdier version of the woodblock.

Jam blocks are usually attached to timbales and drum kits, but they can also be used as standalone orchestral instruments. They are often used in salsa and other Latin American styles, although some modern drummers have used them in rock. They are also often used to keep time during marching band rehearsals where they are popularly known as "gock blocks".

== See also ==
- Woodblock
- Slit drum
- Log drum
- Cowbell
