= Rekords Rekords =

- Founded: 2001
- Founder: Joshua Homme
- Distributor: Domino Recording Company
- Genre: Alternative rock, hard rock, stoner rock
- Country of origin: United States
- Location: California

Rekords Rekords is a record label formed by Josh Homme. It emerged in the aftermath of the downfall of Man's Ruin Records, the record label formerly putting out Homme's project The Desert Sessions. The Desert Sessions, a compilation of collaborative songs that is released in volumes, has been released under the Rekords Rekords label subsequent to the label's formation.

== Artists ==
- Alain Johannes
- The Desert Sessions
- Eagles of Death Metal
- Fatso Jetson
- Likehell
- Mondo Generator
- Mini Mansions
- Queens of the Stone Age
