= Joey Castillo =

American drummer (born 1966)

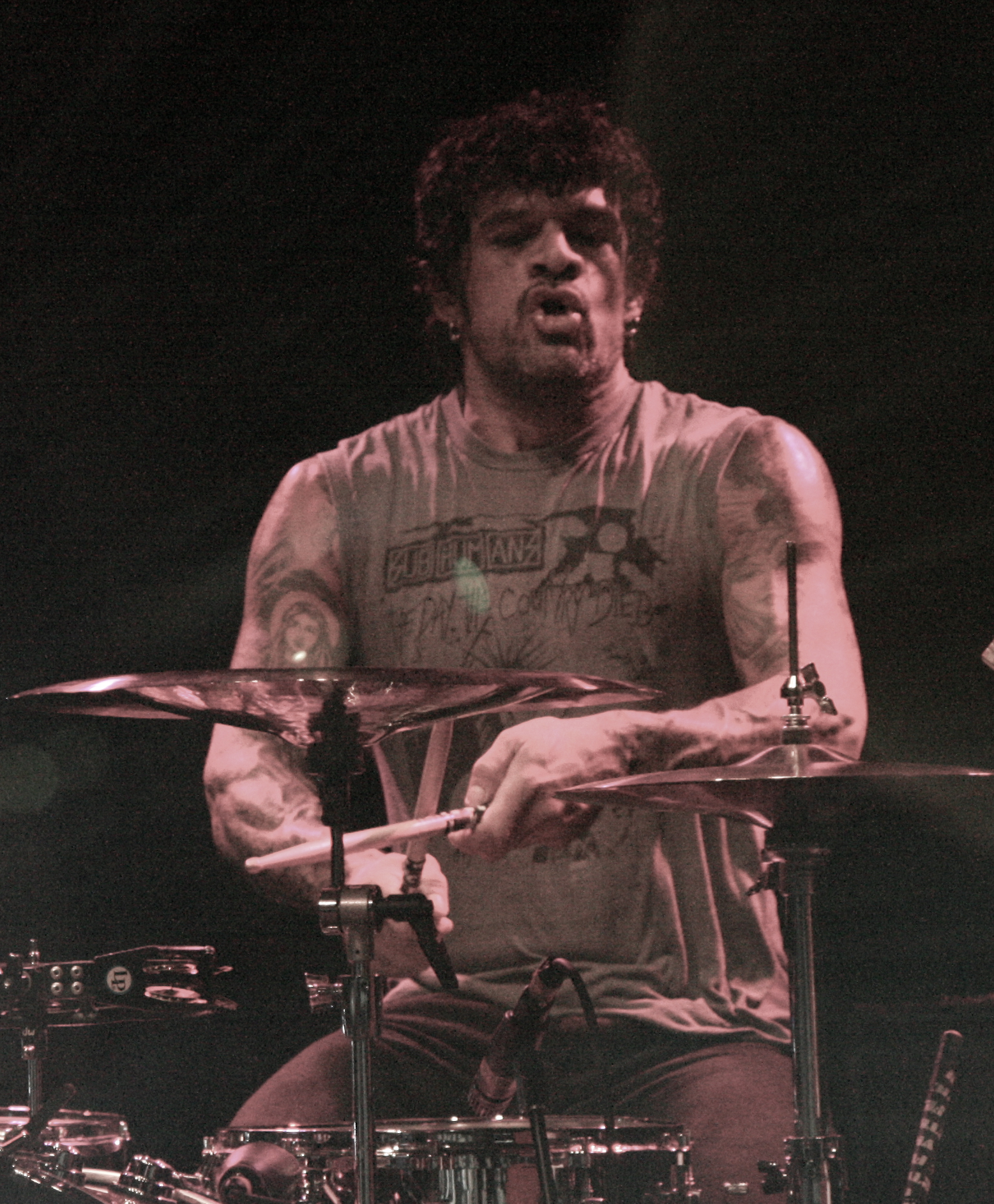
- Castillo performing in 2009

Background information
- Also known as: The Sexy Mexi; Joey C
- Born: Joseph William Castillo; March 30, 1966 (age 60); Gardena, California, U.S.
- Genres: Alternative rock; hard rock; punk rock; heavy metal; stoner rock
- Occupation: Drummer
- Years active: 1984–present
- Member of: Circle Jerks; The Bronx; DOOM Regulator; Zakk Sabbath; Sugartooth
- Formerly of: Queens of the Stone Age; Danzig; Wasted Youth; Zilch; California Breed; Goatsnake; Eagles of Death Metal; Mondo Generator; Trash Talk; BL'AST!; Royale Daemons; Bloodclot

Joseph William Castillo (born March 30, 1966) is an American musician. He is best known for being the drummer of the stoner rock band Queens of the Stone Age from 2002 to 2012. He is currently a member of Circle Jerks, The Bronx, DOOM Regulator, Zakk Sabbath and Sugartooth, with other former bands including Danzig, Wasted Youth, California Breed, Zilch, and Scott Weiland and the Wildabouts.

From 1994 to 2002, Castillo was the drummer of Danzig, recording three studio albums with the band before joining Queens of the Stone Age in 2002 to tour in support of their breakthrough album, Songs for the Deaf. He recorded two albums, Lullabies to Paralyze (2005), Era Vulgaris (2007), and half of ...Like Clockwork (2013) before being fired by founding member Josh Homme during the process.

Since leaving Queens of the Stone Age and Homme side project Eagles of Death Metal in 2012, Castillo joined California Breed, replacing founding member Jason Bonham, joined Scott Weiland and the Wildabouts, touring with the band before the singer's death in 2015, and joined three groups with former Queens of the Stone Age bandmate Nick Oliveri: supergroups Bloodclot (with John Joseph of Cro-Mags and Todd Youth, former Danzig and Murphy's Law guitarist), Royale Daemons (with Wino), and historic punk band Bl'ast. Castillo also has joined Zakk Wylde-led Black Sabbath cover band Zakk Sabbath. In 2023, Castillo along with Tim Armstrong and Jesse Michaels formed the band DOOM Regulator.

== Career ==
A native of Gardena, California, Castillo began playing drums at age 15, when his grandmother loaned him the money to buy a drum kit. His playing is influenced by War, Al Green, Led Zeppelin, the Rolling Stones, and Black Flag. He started off his drumming career by joining the Los Angeles punk band Wasted Youth in 1984. After recording two albums and several tours, he left Wasted Youth and joined Sugartooth in 1991. During the summer of 1994, he formed a short-lived punk rock band named Chronic Halitosis. They played punk covers of bands like Misfits and Black Flag.

In 1994, Castillo left Sugartooth and joined Danzig, having turned down offers from Slayer and Suicidal Tendencies. He worked as Chuck Biscuit's drum tech circa 1990 to 1993; Castillo finally replaced him as live drummer on the 1994 tours, following the release of Danzig 4. From that point on, he was (with exception for Glenn) the only constant Danzig member for almost ten years; he performed all percussion duties on Blackacidevil (1996), Satan's Child (1999) and I Luciferi (2002). In 1996, he was featured on Robert Trujillo's solo album, and in 1998 he joined Zilch. Castillo auditioned for Guns N' Roses in 1997, but did not join the band. He replaced Goatsnake's original drummer after his departure in 2001, but that was short lived when they split up shortly after. Castillo plays drums on the 2001 album Primitive Impulse by Dope Headz, a band formed by Heath and Pata. Also in 2001, he did backing vocals and drums for some tracks on Son of Sam's album Songs From The Earth.

Castillo joined Queens of the Stone Age without an audition, playing through half a song (Avon) at a last-minute rehearsal when frontman Josh Homme reportedly walked out of the room, and returned saying "I just fired the drummer. The tour starts tomorrow," offering Castillo the gig, for which he remained for 10 years. Castillo also played on side projects including Mark Lanegan's solo album Bubblegum, Desert Sessions Vol. 9 & 10 and Eagles of Death Metal's second and third albums Death by Sexy (2006) & Heart On (2008), touring with the latter.

After leaving Queens of the Stone Age in 2012, Castillo has had great demand as a session player, touring musician as well as becoming a proper band member in numerous projects.

Notably, on June 25, 2017, Castillo, along with Trent Reznor, Mariqueen Maandig Reznor, Robin Finck, Atticus Ross, and Alessandro Cortini appeared as "The Nine Inch Nails" in Episode 8 of Twin Peaks: The Return, performing an alternate live rendition of the song "She's Gone Away", which had appeared on Nine Inch Nails' 2016 album Not the Actual Events.

In 2018, Castillo joined The Bronx after founding member Jorma Vik left to play with Castillo's former band Eagles of Death Metal. The following year, he toured in a session capacity with The Hives.

In July 2021, hardcore punk band Circle Jerks announced that Castillo would be their new drummer and he would join them on their reunion tour to celebrate the 40th anniversary of their 1980 album Group Sex. The tour was announced in 2019 and planned for 2020 however it was postponed until 2021 due to the COVID-19 pandemic.

In March 2023, Castillo formed the band Bad Optix along with Tim Armstrong, Jesse Michaels and Spencer Pollard. The group released "Raid", their first single. Less than a week after announcing the formation of the band, the band changed their name to DOOM Regulator.

== Personal life ==
As of 2007, Castillo resided in Joshua Tree, California with his four children and his wife. Castillo is Mexican.

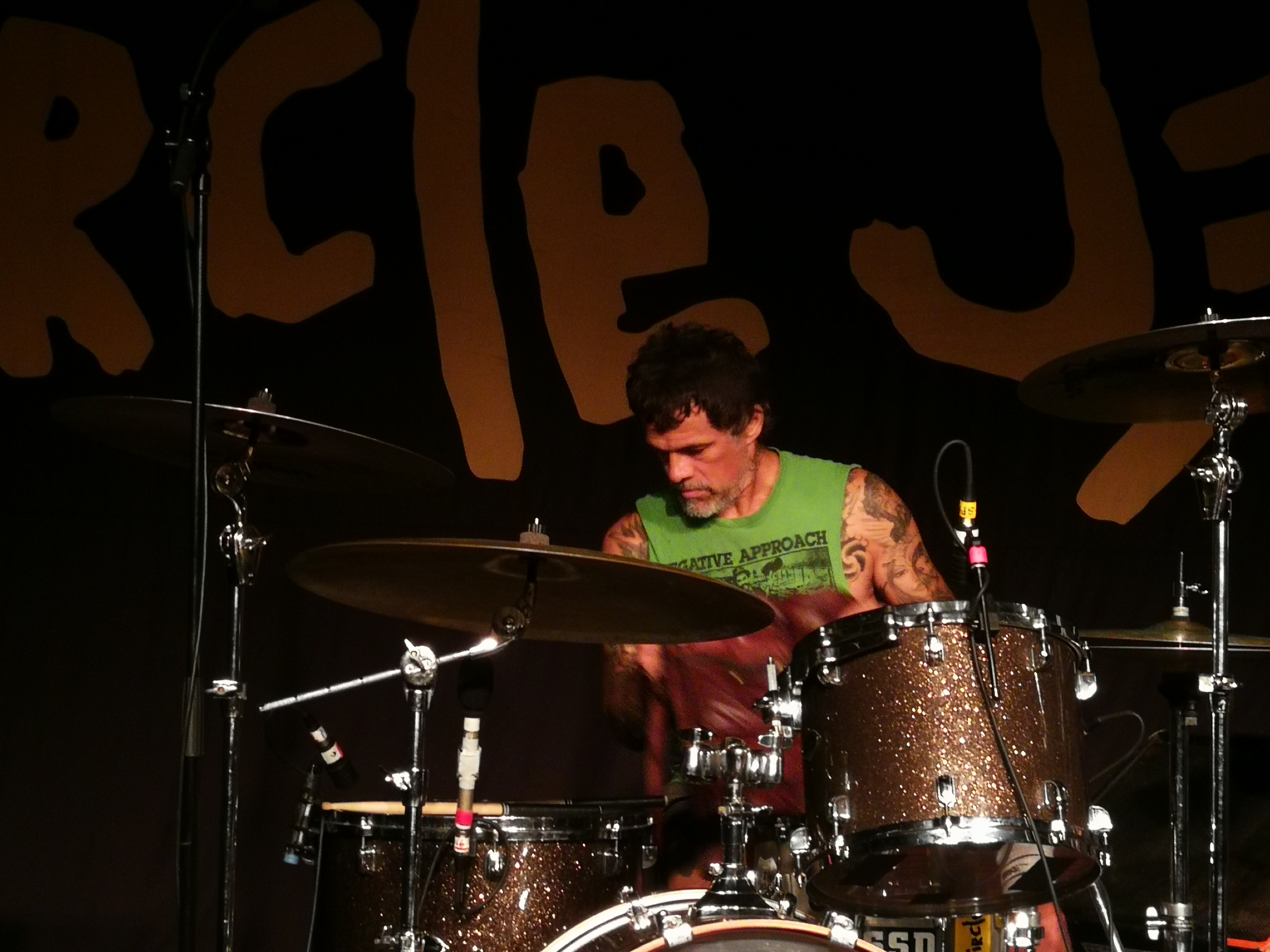
Joey Castillo (2024)

== Equipment ==
Castillo currently uses Tama drums, pedals and hardware, Zildjian cymbals, Vater sticks and LP equipment. In 2018, he switched back to Tama after over ten years with Oxnard, California's Drum Workshop and five years with San Pedro's Q Drum Co. Pre-QOTSA he was known to use Tama drums, Paiste cymbals and Easton sticks.

Castillo is famous for his use of the LP Jam block. The tone of the jam block appears solo at the outset of the Queens of the Stone Age single "Little Sister" from the album Lullabies to Paralyze, Castillo's first studio album with the band.

Castillo also has two drumkits which belonged to Chuck Biscuits and considers them his most prized possessions.

=== 2014–2018 ===
Q Drum Co drums (Clear seamless Acrylic or Black Stain Mahogany)

- 26"x14" Bass Drum
- 14"x10" Rack Tom
- 18"x16" Floor Tom
- 14"x8" Aluminum Plate Snare

DW Hardware

- DW 6710 straight cymbal stands (3x)
- DW 5000 Hi-Hat Stand
- DW 9000 bass pedal

Zildjian Cymbals

- Zildjian 24-inch K Light ride
- Zildjian 21-inch K Crash Ride
- Zildjian 20-inch K Crash
- Zildjian 16-inch K Light Hi Hats

Vater Sticks

- Vater Rock, Power 5B and Power 3A

Remo Heads

- Snare: Remo Emperor X
- Toms: Remo Clear Emperor's
- Bass: Remo Clear Powerstroke III with Falam Slam

=== 2018–present ===
Tama Star Maple Drums (Gloss Natural Curly Maple Finh)

- 26"x14" Bass Drum
- 15"x12" Rack Tom
- 20"x18" Floor Tom
- 14"x8" Q Drum Co. Aluminum Plate Snare

Tama Hardware

- Tama HC52F "The Classic Stand" (3x)
- Tama HH915D Speed Cobra 910 Hi-Hat Stand or HH55F "The Classic"
- Tama HP910LN Speed Cobra 910 single pedal

Zildjian Cymbals

- 15" K Sweet Hi-Hats
- 20" K Dark Crash Thin
- 24" Z Heavy Power Ride
- 21" K Crash/Ride

Vater "ROCK" Drumsticks

Remo Drumheads

- Snare – Emperor X
- Toms – Coated Emperors (Batter) / Clear Ambassadors (Resonant)
- Bass – Coated Powerstroke P3 (Batter) / Smooth White and Ebony Powerstroke P3s (Resonant)

Castillo has also been seen using Ebony Pinstripes and clear Controlled Sounds on his toms.

== QOTSA Era Gear (2002–2012) ==
=== Reissue tours equipment (2010–2012) ===
DW Drums Jazz Series (Silver Sparkle)

- 24"x16" Bass Drum
- 14"x10" Mounted Tom
- 16"x16" Floor Tom (not used in 2011)
- 18"x16" Floor Tom
- 14"x8" Steel Sonor Snare formerly owned by Chuck Biscuits

DW Hardware

- DW 6710 straight cymbal stands (x3)
- DW 6500 Hi-Hat Stand
- DW 9300 Snare Stand (x2)
- DW 9000 Bass Drum Pedal
- DW 9100AL Airlift throne

Zildjian Cymbals

- Zildjian 24" A Medium Ride (2010) 24-inch K Light ride (2011)
- Zildjian 21" K Crash Ride
- Zildjian 19" K Custom Hybrid crash
- Zildjian 14.25" K Custom Hybrid Hi-Hats

Vic Firth Sticks

- Vic Firth Extreme 5B sticks

Remo Heads

- Snare: Remo Controlled Sound Clear
- Toms: Remo Controlled Sound
- Bass: Remo Clear Powerstroke III with Falam Slam

Latin Percussion

- LP160 Cyclops Tambourine Brass and Steel (as configured below)
- LP1208-K Stealth Jam Block
- LP Matador Wood Bongos Black/Chrome

=== Heart On (Eagles of Death Metal) tour equipment (2008–2012) ===
DW Drums Classic Series (Brown to Black Duco)

- 22"x14" Bass Drum
- 16x16" Floor Tom
- 14"x8" Steel Sonor Snare formerly owned by Chuck Biscuits

DW Hardware

- DW 6710 straight cymbal stands (x3)
- DW 6500 Hi-Hat Stand
- DW 9300 Snare Stand
- DW 9000 Bass Drum Pedal
- DW 9100AL Airlift throne

Zildjian Cymbals

- Zildjian 16" Oriental China
- Zildjian 15" A Crash
- Zildjian 14" New Beat Hi-Hats

Vic Firth Sticks

- Vic Firth Extreme 5B sticks

Remo Heads

- Snare: Remo Controlled Sound Clear
- Toms: Remo Controlled Sound
- Bass: Remo Clear Powerstroke III with Falam Slam

Latin Percussion

- LP160 Cyclops Tambourine Steel (on hi-hat) and Brass (bass drum mounted)
- LP1207 Jam Block (on stand)

=== Era Vulgaris tour equipment (2007–2008) ===
Castillo used larger sized tom drums than ever before, while moving to a smaller bass drum, the opposite of the Lullabies-era configuration. He continued using Vic Firth sticks, DW drums with OCDP clear acrylic shells, DW pedals and hardware, but switched from using Paiste to Zildjian cymbals.

DW Drums

- 22"x18" Bass Drum with rail consolette cymbal mount for Cup Chime
- 14"x12" Mounted Concert Tom
- 18"x16" Floor Concert Tom
- 14"x6.5" Cast Bronze Snare with wood top hoop

DW Hardware

- 5000TD Delta3 Turbo Single Bass Drum Pedal, 9000 Series Pedal (2008)
- 5500TD Delta Turbo Hi-Hat Stand
- 9300 Snare Drum Stand (x2)
- 6710 Straight Cymbal Stand (x3)
- 9101 Low Drum Throne

Vic Firth Sticks

- Vic Firth American Classic Series X5A & X5B

Zildjian Cymbals

- 13.25" (early 2007), 14.25" Zildjian K Custom Hybrid Hi-Hats
- 17" Zildjian K Custom Hybrid Crash (early 2007), 19" K Custom Hybrid Crash
- 24" Zildjian K Light Ride
- 18" Zildjian K Crash Ride (early 2007), 21" K Prototype Crash
- 18" Zildjian K China (on song for song basis)
- 13" Paiste Mega Cup Chime (2007)

Remo Heads

- Snare: Remo Emperor X (2007), Remo Clear Controlled Sound (2008)
- Toms: Remo Controlled Sound
- Bass: Remo Controlled Sound with Falam Slam

Latin Percussion

- LP160 Cyclops Tambourine Brass and Steel (as configured below)
- LP1207 Stealth Jam Block (Black)

Additional Joey also used Rtom Moongel on Toms and Snare and Remo 0 ring on Snare

=== Lullabies To Paralyze tour equipment (2005–2006) ===
For the Lullabies tour, Castillo continued to use DW drums, Paiste cymbals and Remo heads. Though during this tour he started using Vic Firth sticks instead of Vater. Joey also dropped his second floor tom and LP bongos during this tour and added on an LP jamblock to his drumkit. From this tour and on, he would use the toms to play "Better Living Through Chemistry" during the verses. During the Lullabies tour Joey started removing his bottom heads on both his toms To achieve the "concert tom" sound which gave his toms a punchy, fatter sound

DW Drums

- 26"x20" Bass Drum
- 13"x10" Rack Tom
- 16"x14" Floor Tom
- 14"x6.5" Cast Bronze Snare with wood top hoop

DW Hardware

- 5000TD Delta3 Turbo Single Bass Drum Pedal
- 5500TD Delta Turbo Hi-Hat Stand
- 9300 Snare Drum Stand (x2)
- 6710 Straight Cymbal Stand (x3)
- 9101 Low Drum Throne

Vic Firth Sticks

- Vic Firth American Classic Series X5B

Paiste Cymbals

- 14" 2002 Medium Hi-Hats
- 19" Black Rude Thin Crash
- 20" Black Rude Thin Crash
- 24" 2002 Ride

Remo Heads

- Snare: CS Coated Power Dot on top or Emperor X, Remo Ambassador Snare Side on bottom
- Toms: Coated Emperor tops, Clear Ambassador bottoms (Later in the tour Joey replaced the Coated Emperors with CS Clears on tops but removed the bottoms for the Concert Tom sound)
- Bass: Clear Powerstroke 3 on batter, DW Ambassador resonant side

Latin Percussion

- LP160 Cyclops Tambourine Brass (mounted off cymbal stand next to floor tom) and Steel (mounted on bass drum rim, interchanged with jam block)
- LP1207 Jam Block (Red)

Additional Joey also used Rtom Moongel on Toms and Snare and Remo 0 ring on Snare

=== Songs for the Deaf tour equipment (2002–2004) ===
Castillo used DW drums and hardware, Paiste cymbals and Remo heads during the Songs for the Deaf tour, occasionally using PDP kits for one-off performances.

DW Drums (Ebony Satin Stain, Broken Glass)

- 24"x18" Bass Drum
- 13"x11" Rack Tom
- 16"x14" Floor Tom
- 18"x16" Floor Tom
- 14"x6.5" Cast Bronze Snare Drum

DW Hardware

- 5000TD Delta3 Turbo Single Bass Drum Pedal
- 5500TD Delta Turbo Hi-Hat Stand
- 9300 Snare Drum Stand (x2)
- 9710 Straight Cymbal Stand (x2)
- 9700 Straight/Boom Cymbal Stand
- 9101 Low Drum Throne

Vater Sticks

- Vater Rock and Power 5A

Paiste Cymbals

- 15" 2002 Sound Edge Hi-Hats
- 18" 2002 Medium Crash
- 20" 2002 Medium Crash
- 24" 2002 Ride

(All White by Lollapalooza 2003)

Remo Heads

- Snare: CS Coated Power Dot on top, Remo Ambassador Snare Side on bottom
- Toms: Coated Emperor tops, Clear Ambassador bottoms
- Bass: Clear Powerstroke 3 on batter, DW Ambassador resonant side

Latin Percussion

- LP160 Cyclops Tambourine Brass
- LP201A-2 Generation II Bongos

== Discography ==
Year	Band or artist	Album
1986	Wasted Youth	Get Out of My Yard!
1988	Wasted Youth	Black Daze
1994	Sugartooth	Sugartooth
1996	Danzig	Blackacidevil
1997	Sugartooth	The Sounds of Solid
1998	Zilch	3.2.1.
1998	Zilch	Bastard Eyes
1999	Danzig	6:66 Satan's Child
2001	Zilch	Skyjin
2001	Youjeen	Hey Jerks
2001	Danzig	Live on the Black Hand Side
2001	Son of Sam	Songs From The Earth
2002	Danzig	I Luciferi
2003	Desert Sessions	Volumes 9 & 10
2004	Mark Lanegan Band	Bubblegum
2005	Queens of the Stone Age	Lullabies to Paralyze
2005	Queens of the Stone Age	Over The Years And Through The Woods
2006	Eagles of Death Metal	Death by Sexy
2007	Danzig	The Lost Tracks of Danzig
2007	Queens of the Stone Age	Era Vulgaris
2008	Eagles of Death Metal	Heart On
2009	Hello=Fire	Hello=Fire
2011	Boots Electric	Honkey Kong
2013	Queens of the Stone Age	...Like Clockwork
2016	BL'AST!	BL'AST! / eyehategod split 7-inch
2016	Zakk Sabbath	Live in Detroit (live EP)
2017	Bloodclot	Up in Arms
2020	Danzig	Danzig Sings Elvis
2020	Zakk Sabbath	Vertigo
2020	The Hives	Live at Third Man Records
2020	Patrón	Patrón
2021	The Bronx	Bronx VI
2023	DOOM Regulator	"Raid"
2024	Zakk Sabbath	"Doomed Forever Forever Doomed"
