= Alain Johannes =

Chilean-American musician (born 1962)

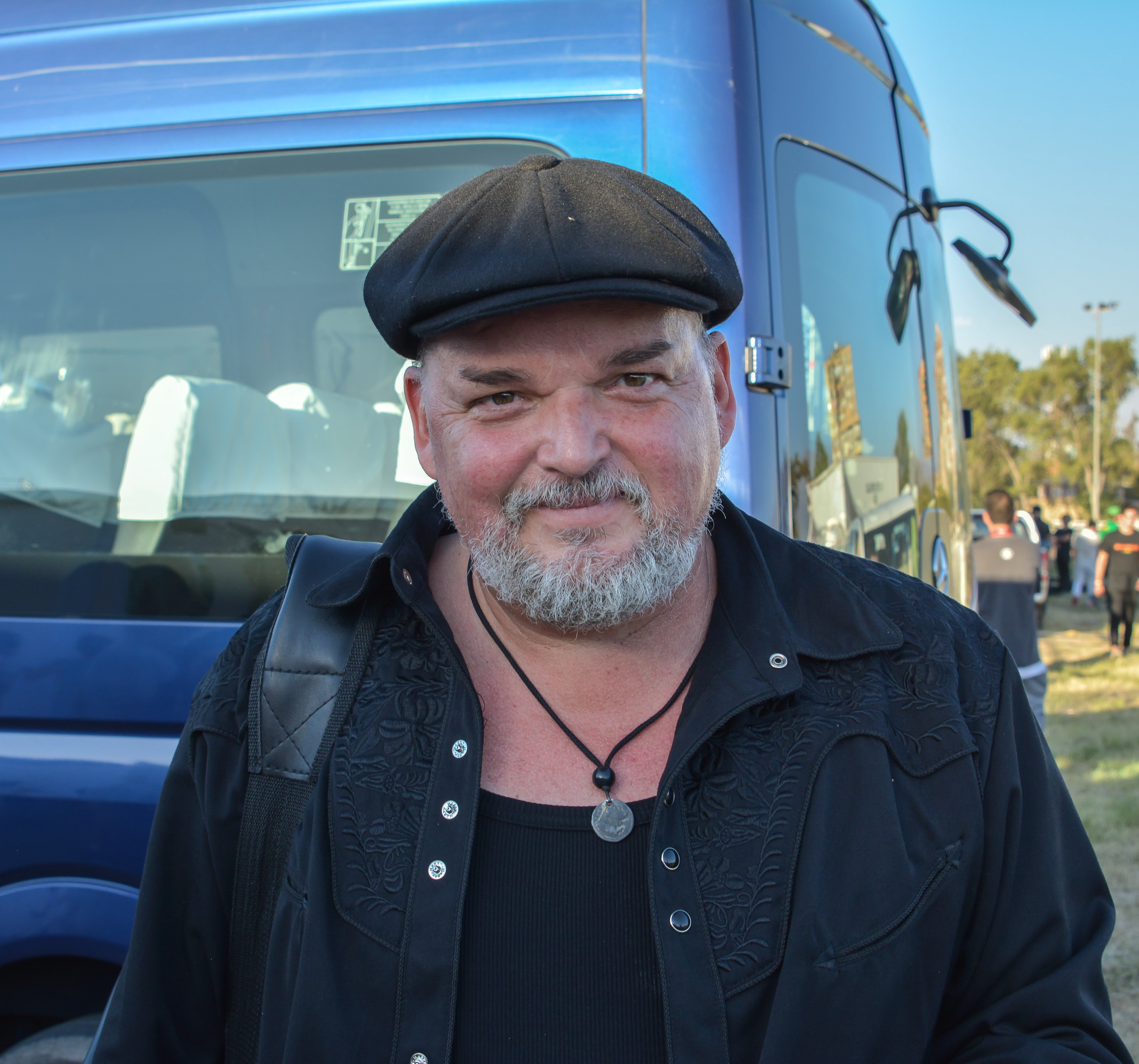
- Johannes in 2018

Background information
- Born: Alain Johannes Mociulski; May 2, 1962 (age 64); Santiago, Chile
- Genres: Alternative rock; blues rock; experimental rock; hard rock; electronic
- Occupations: Musician; songwriter; record producer; audio engineer
- Instruments: Vocals; guitar; bass; keyboards; saxophone
- Years active: 1980s–present
- Labels: MCA; Interscope; Rekords Rekords; Sire; Ipecac
- Website: alainjohannes.com

Alain Johannes Mociulski (born May 2, 1962) is a Chilean-American multi-instrumentalist and vocalist, whose primary instruments are guitar and bass. He is a founding member of several bands, including the alternative rock group Eleven, and has been involved with acts such as Queens of the Stone Age, Them Crooked Vultures, PJ Harvey, Chris Cornell, Arctic Monkeys, Mark Lanegan and The Desert Sessions, both as a musician and as a producer.

Alain Johannes is a nephew of Chilean nueva ola musician Peter Rock. He was born in Santiago. He was married to Natasha Shneider from 1987 until her death in 2008.

== Career ==
In his teen years, Johannes formed the band Chain Reaction (later Anthym) with Hillel Slovak, Todd Strassman, and Jack Irons. This band was later renamed What Is This. Todd Strassman was replaced by Flea, who was replaced, upon leaving the band, by Chris Hutchinson.

In 1987, Johannes and Natasha Shneider formed the band Walk the Moon, which released one self-titled album on MCA Records. Reportedly, Chris Hutchinson and Jack Irons played on some of its tracks.

Eleven was formed in 1990 and released their debut album Awake in a Dream in 1991, which included the pop based singles "Rainbows End" and "All Together". They followed this with regular releases Eleven in 1993, Thunk! in 1995, Avantgardedog in 2000, and Howling Book in 2003.

Johannes was the only other contributor on the 1996 debut album by Jason Falkner, Jason Falkner Presents Author Unknown. He was also a significant contributor to Chris Cornell's 1999 solo album, Euphoria Morning as a guitarist, writer and producer. He also toured as part of Chris Cornell's band in support of this album alongside Natasha Shneider, Greg Upchurch and Rick Markmann, who also comprised Eleven's line-up at the time. He mixed and played on Jack Irons' first solo record, Attention Dimension, released in 2004, and he co-wrote on Danish stoner rock outfit The Royal Highness.

In 2005, he joined Queens of the Stone Age to play guitar as well as bass on Lullabies to Paralyze. He had previously guested on Lullabies' predecessor, Songs for the Deaf, having also co-written the track "Hanging Tree" during one of The Desert Sessions. He would participate in the tour for the album and appears on the live DVD, Over the Years and Through the Woods in the main concert. Johannes once again contributed a main role to Lullabies' follow up, Era Vulgaris, but he opted to concentrate on Eleven with Natasha Shneider, and the pair bowed out of touring before the album's promotion started.

In 2007, Johannes became a part of Brody Dalle's post-Distillers effort, Spinnerette.

In August 2009, he joined Them Crooked Vultures, with Foo Fighters frontman Dave Grohl, Queens of the Stone Age frontman Josh Homme and former Led Zeppelin bass player John Paul Jones. Johannes contributed guitar, bass, keyboards, and backing vocals on their 2009–2010 tour, often playing his own solo guitar section during the set.

In late 2008, a song he co-wrote with Shneider, "Time for Miracles", was recorded by Adam Lambert and used in the movie 2012.

On October 5, 2010, he released his solo debut album Spark, a tribute to the late Natasha Shneider.

On September 5, 2012, Jimmy Eat World announced that he would be a producer/engineer on their 8th studio album.

In 2013, he became a player in Dave Grohl's Sound City Players project, writing and recording a song for the album, and playing a major role in the live performances.

On November 11, 2014, he released his second solo album, Fragments and Wholes Vol. 1, drawing inspiration from the death of his parents as well as that of Natasha Shneider.

Johannes began working with PJ Harvey in 2014. From 2016 to 2017, Johannes was a part of PJ Harvey's touring ensemble for her world tour in support of her album The Hope Six Demolition Project. He also played on the album itself.

In 2015, he was the producer of K's Choice album The Phantom Cowboy, and Edith Crash's Partir.

In 2016, he composed and performed the soundtrack for the Ubisoft game, Tom Clancy's Ghost Recon Wildlands.

In 2020, his third solo record Hum was released on Ipecac Records to favorable critical reviews

On September 3, 2022, Them Crooked Vultures reunited for a performance at Wembley Stadium in honour of Foo Fighters' late drummer Taylor Hawkins and again on September 27, 2022 at the Kia Forum for the second tribute show.

In May 2024, Alain was playing with Masters of Reality. He was also their support act, solo on stage with his cigar box guitar. Johannes also toured across Europe with a selected band from countries he played in forming his backing band, allowing him to play Eleven and Desert Sessions songs in his sets. In the UK leg for example, Alain's backing band were Earl of Hell, who also opened for him on the tour. Along with past collaborator Chris Goss, Alain contributed the Jethro Tull song "Aqualung" from the 1971 album Aqualung to the tribute album Aqualung (Redux) released through Magnetic Eye Records in December 2024. The song followed the original arrangement but was done in the a cappella format using voices performing the instrumentation along with various electronic percussion noises. It was favorably reviewed as being like a "nightmare" scored with surrealist music.

== Selected discography ==
Throughout his career Johannes has worked with a wide range of artists and bands in various genres as a musician, record engineer and producer.

Band or artist	Album	Year	Credits
Addie Brik	Wattsland (EP)	1984	Vocals, guitar, production
What Is This?	Squeezed (EP)	1984	Vocals, guitar
What Is This?	What Is This?	1985	Vocals, guitar
What Is This?	3 Out of 5 Live (EP)	1985	Vocals, guitar
Thelonious Monster	Baby, You're Bummin' My Life Out in a Supreme Fashion	1986	Flute, saxophone
Walk the Moon	Walk the Moon	1987	Vocals, guitar, saxophone, programming, percussion, e-bow
Eleven	Awake In A Dream	1991	Guitar
Sun 60	Only	1993	Guitar
Melissa Ferrick	Massive Blur	1993	Guitar
Eleven	Eleven	1993	Guitar, vocals
Eleven	Thunk	1995	Guitar, percussion, horn, sitar
Jason Falkner	Presents Author Unknown	1996	Guitar
Gouds Thumb	Gouds Thumb	1996	Guitar
Dalbello	Whore	1996	Guitar
Chris Cornell	Euphoria Morning	1999	Guitar, bass, backing vocals, theremin, mandolin, clarinet, tabla, production, mixing
Queens of the Stone Age	Rated R	2000	Mixing
Eleven	Avantgardedog	2000	Guitar, vocals, producer, engineer
No Doubt	Return of Saturn	2000	Recording
The Desert Sessions	Volume 7 & 8	2001	Guitar, fiddle, harmonium, saxophone, vocals, clavinet, udu, mixing
Live	V	2001	Sitar, production
No Doubt	Rock Steady	2002	Additional engineer
Queens of the Stone Age	Songs for the Deaf	2002	Organ, piano, guitar, theremin, lap steel guitar
UNKLE	Never, Never, Land	2003	Remixing
Matt Costa	Matt Costa (EP)	2003	Mastering
The Desert Sessions	Volume 9 & 10	2003	Guitar, bass, flute, vocals, mandolin, e-bow, keyboard
Mondo Generator	A Drug Problem That Never Existed	2003	Engineer, mixing, mastering
Eleven	Howling Book	2003	Guitar, vocals
Mark Lanegan Band	Bubblegum	2004	Guitar, bass, drums, organ, keyboards, vocals, mixing, production
Sugarcult	Palm Trees and Power Lines	2004	Additional guitar
Jack Irons	Attention Dimension	2004	Banjo, flute, guitar, saxophone, vocals, sarod, engineer, mixing, marxophone, santoor
Janubia	Mother Tongue	2004	Mixing, mastering, additional instrumentation
Masters of Reality	Give Us Barabbas	2004	Editing
Eagles of Death Metal	Peace Love Death Metal	2004	Piano, vocals, engineering, mastering, mixing
Queens of the Stone Age	Lullabies to Paralyze	2005	Bass, guitar, flute, marxophone
Queens of the Stone Age	Over the Years and Through the Woods	2005	Bass, guitar, backing vocals
Millionaire	Paradisiac	2005	Mixing, recording
Eagles of Death Metal	Death by Sexy	2006	Mixing
Wires on Fire	Wires on Fire	2006	Saxophone, mixing, mastering, engineering
Queens of the Stone Age	Era Vulgaris	2007	Bass, guitar, fiddle, marxophone, mixing
Silverchair	Young Modern	2007	Slide guitar
Hilary Duff	Dignity	2007	Mixing
Puscifer	V is for Vagina	2007	Guitar
Spinnerette	Ghetto Love (EP)	2008	Bass
Eagles of Death Metal	Heart On	2008	Horn, engineer
The Gutter Twins	Saturnalia	2008	Recording
Kelly Clarkson	All I Ever Wanted	2009	Guitar
Nosfell	Nosfell	2009	Producing, mixing, guitar, marxophone, bass, cigfiddle
Spinnerette	Spinnerette	2009	Production, mixing, engineer, bass, guitar, cigfiddle
Arctic Monkeys	Humbug	2009	Engineering
Them Crooked Vultures	Them Crooked Vultures	2009	Recording, backing vocals
Alain Johannes	Spark	2010	Recording, producing, mixing, guitars, vocals, bass
Manna	Shackles	2011	Producer
Mark Lanegan	Blues Funeral	2012	Producing, engineering, mixing, guitar, bass, keyboards, percussion, backing vocals
Sound City	Reel to Real (soundtrack)	2013	Bass, vocals on "Your Wife is Calling"; guitar on "Centipede"; vocals, guitars on "A Trick With No Sleeve"
Loading Data	Double Disco Animal Style	2013	Producer, backing vocals, drums, keyboards, bass, guitars
Jimmy Eat World	Damage	2013	Producer
Brody Dalle	Diploid Love	2014	Co-producer, guitars, bass, piano, trumpet, mellotron, slide guitars
Alain Johannes	Fragments & Wholes, Vol. 1	2014	Recording, producing, mixing, guitars, vocals, bass
K's Choice	The Phantom Cowboy	2015	Producer
Kazuya Yoshii	"Chōzetsu Dynamic!"	2015	Guitar
Edith Crash	Partir	2015	Producer
Kensico	White Sage	2015	Guitars, e-bow, cigar box, percussions, recording
PJ Harvey	The Hope Six Demolition Project	2016	Guitar, handclapping, keyboards, percussion, saxophone, vocals (background)
Alain Johannes	Ghost Recon Wildlands OST	2016	itaru
Mark Lanegan Band	Gargoyle	2017	Producer, co-writer, keyboards, guitar, bass, mellotron, synthesizer, percussion, e-bow, vocals (background)
Garry Pitcairn	The Gospel	2019	Mixing, mastering
Aurelia	Sharp Words	2019	Producer, mixer, guitar, bass, cigar box guitar, keyboards, percussion, e-bow
Big Scenic Nowhere	Vision Beyond Horizon	2020	Co-writer, guitar, vocals
Patrón	Patrón	2020	Producer, engineer, mixer, keyboards, guitar, bass, vocals (background)
Alain Johannes	Hum	2020	Composer, engineer, mixing, primary artist.
Des Rocs	Dream Machine	2023	Producer
Tarah Who?	The Last Chase	2024	Producer, engineer, mixer, guitar, backing vocals
Earl of Hell	Earl of Hell	2025	Producer, mixing, mastering
Sick Joy	More Forever	2026	Producer, engineer, guitar, backing vocals
Okay You Win	End of Days	2026	Mastering
