= Josh Homme discography =

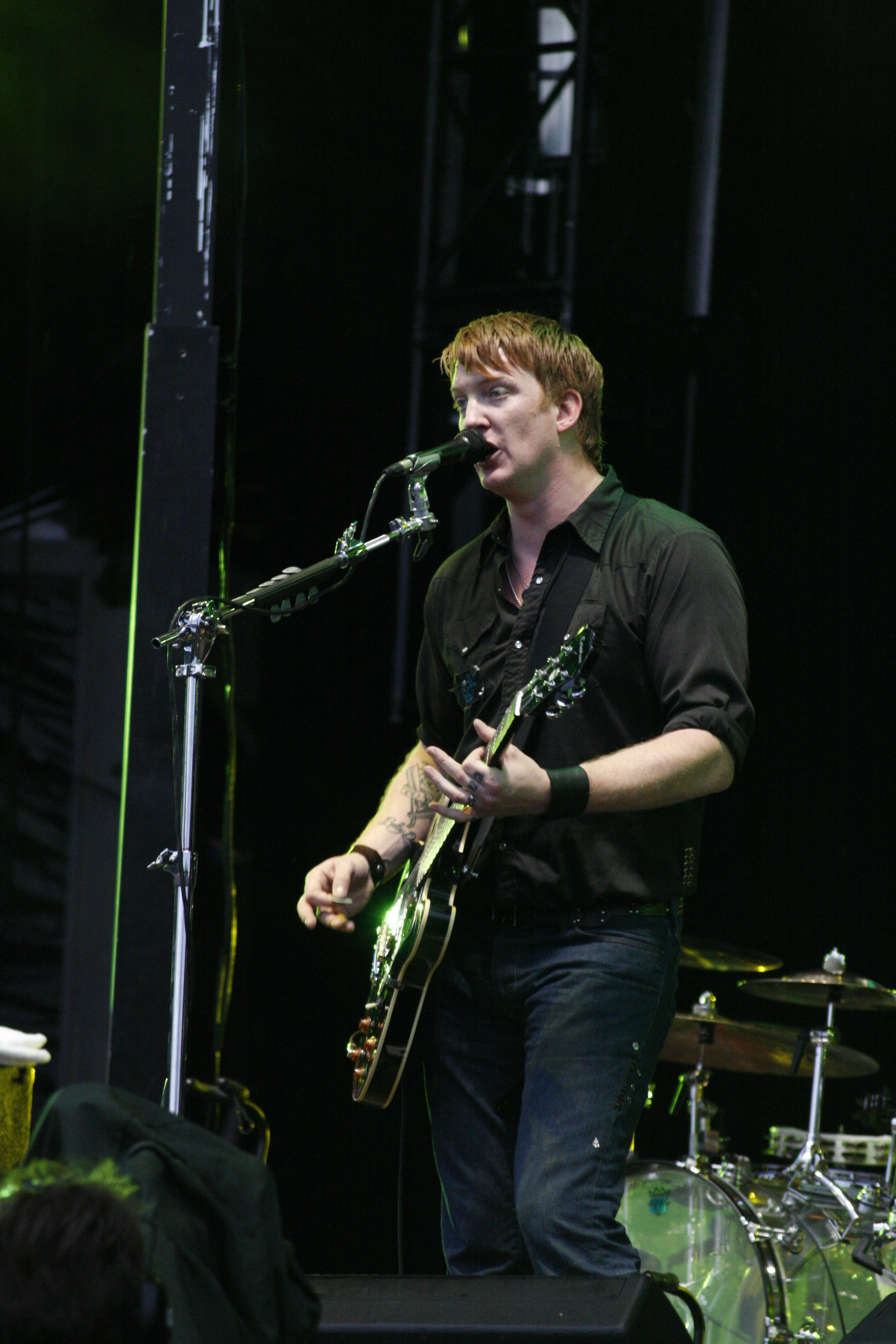
Homme performing at the 2007 Wireless Festival

Josh Homme is an American rock musician who has released 18 studio albums and collaborated with over 25 different artists. He started playing guitar in the 1980s and formed a band with Palm Desert, California schoolmates John Garcia and Brant Bjork, initially under the name Katzenjammer, then Sons of Kyuss, and later shortened to simply Kyuss. The band released an EP called Sons of Kyuss (1990) when Homme was 16 years old, before going on to record four critically acclaimed studio albums and a greatest hits release without breaking through to mainstream success. After the breakup of the band in 1995, Homme considered abandoning his music career, but was persuaded by vocalist Mark Lanegan to join the Screaming Trees on tour as second guitarist.

In August 1997, Homme gathered a few musician friends at recording studio Rancho de la Luna for a weekend of collaborations called "The Desert Sessions". The experiment yielded two albums, Volumes 1 & 2, and Homme would repeat the exercise at the same studio with different musicians on a further four occasions over the next decade.

Also in 1997, Homme formed Queens of the Stone Age with former Kyuss drummer Alfredo Hernández, initially under the name Gamma Ray. In 1998, Queens of the Stone Age released their self-titled debut album, on which Homme performed lead vocals, guitar, and bass guitar. Queens of the Stone Age would adopt a fluid line-up, with dozens of members joining and leaving as the band developed while Homme remained the only permanent member. They have released several EPs, compilations, a DVD, and a total of eight studio albums, including the break-through Songs for the Deaf (2002).

Eagles of Death Metal started out as an impromptu collaboration on the Desert Sessions' 1998 release Volume 4: Hard Walls and Little Trips, but became a full-time band with the recording and release of their debut album, Peace, Love, Death Metal, in 2004. The original line-up included Homme on drums and his childhood friend Jesse Hughes on lead vocals and guitar, although Homme rarely tours with the band due to his commitments with Queens of the Stone Age. In 2006, Eagles of Death Metal released its second studio album, Death by Sexy, which became their first album to chart on the Billboard 200. The band has since released a further two albums.

In 2009, Homme appeared alongside Dave Grohl and John Paul Jones in the band Them Crooked Vultures. The band has so far put out one record, the self-titled Them Crooked Vultures. Plans for a follow-up in the future continue, with Homme and Grohl both continuing to state their commitment to the band despite their numerous other projects.

Homme has also appeared on the releases of several other bands, including Deep in the Hole (2001) and Flak 'n' Flight (2003) by Masters of Reality, Cocaine Rodeo (2000) and A Drug Problem That Never Existed (2003) by Mondo Generator, In Your Honor by Foo Fighters (2005), and Impeach My Bush by Peaches (2006).

== Writing and performance ==
Year	Album	Comment
2002	The Dangerous Lives of Altar Boys (Original Motion Picture Soundtrack)	The soundtrack was composed by Marco Beltrami and was released in 2002 by Milan Records. A good part of the songs on the soundtrack were specifically written and performed for this film by Homme.
2012	End of Watch	The song "Nobody to Love" plays during the credits.
2017	In The Fade (Original Motion Picture Soundtrack)	

== Production credits ==
Year	Artist(s)	Album	Comment
1997	Fu Manchu	Godzilla	Producer alongside Fu Manchu
1997	Beaver	The Difference Engine	Producer on "Green" alongside David Catching and Hutch
2005	Millionaire	Paradisiac	
2007	Various Artists	Hot Rod (Music from the Motion Picture)	Producer on "Head Honcho," performed as a member of Gown (alias for Queens of the Stone Age)
2009	Arctic Monkeys	Humbug	Producer for 7 of the 10 tracks
2010	Mini Mansions	Mini Mansions	Mixing
2012	The Hives	Lex Hives	Producer for deluxe version bonus tracks
2016	Iggy Pop	Post Pop Depression	
2016	CRX	New Skin	
2021	Royal Blood	Typhoons	Producer on "Boilermaker", and bonus tracks "Space" and "King"
2022	Nikki Lane	Denim & Diamonds	

== Remixes ==
Year	Artist(s)	Album	Song(s)
2005	Death from Above 1979	Romance Bloody Romance	"Black History Month"
2009	The Prodigy		"Take Me To The Hospital"
2011	The Dead Weather		"Hang You from the Heavens"
2011	Grinderman		"Mickey Mouse and the Goodbye Man"

== Contributions and guest appearances ==
Year	Artist(s)	Album	Comment
1997	Fu Manchu	Godzilla	Lead guitar on "Godzilla", additional percussion.
1998	Mike Johnson	I Feel Alright	Bass guitar
1999	Wellwater Conspiracy	Brotherhood of Electric	Vocals on "Teen Lambchop", "Red Light, Green Light", and "Ladder to the Moon", bass guitar on "Ladder to the Moon" and "Good Pushin'"
2000	Earthlings?	Human Beans	Vocals on "Visionary Messenger"
2000	Mondo Generator	Cocaine Rodeo	Guitar on "13th Floor", "Simple Exploding Man (Extended version)" and "Cocaine Rodeo"
2001	Masters of Reality	Deep in the Hole	Performer
2002	Local H	Here Comes the Zoo	Performer on "Rock & Roll Professionals" (credited as J.Ho)
2002	Various Artists	Rise Above: 24 Black Flag Songs to Benefit the West Memphis Three	Background vocals on "Rise Above", "TV Party", "Six Pack", "Annihilate This Week"
2002	Earthlings?	Disco Marching Kraft	Bass guitar on "Disco Marching Kraft"
2003	Mark Lanegan	Here Comes That Weird Chill	Bass, guitar, drums
2003	Martina Topley-Bird	Quixotic	Additional guitar on "Need One"
2003	Masters of Reality	Flak 'n' Flight	Guitar, vocals
2003	Mondo Generator	A Drug Problem That Never Existed	Performer and writer for "Do The Headright" and "Me And You"
2003	Unkle	Never, Never Land	Vocals on "Safe In Mind (Please Get This Gun From Out My Face)"
2004	Auf der Maur	Auf der Maur	Guitar on "Followed The Waves", "I'll Be Anything You Want", "My Foggy Notion" and "I Need I Want I Will" and additional vocals on "Skin Receiver"
2004	Mark Lanegan	Bubblegum	Various instruments on "Hit The City", "Wedding Dress", "Methamphetamine Blues", "One Hundred Days" and "Come To Me"
2005	Eleven	Killer Queen: A Tribute to Queen	featured on "Stone Cold Crazy"
2005	Foo Fighters	In Your Honor	Rhythm guitar on "Razor"
2006	The Strokes	"You Only Live Once"	Additional drums on "Mercy Mercy Me (The Ecology)"
2006	Mastodon	Blood Mountain	Guest vocals on "Colony of Birchmen" and hidden message on "Pendulous Skin"
2006	Peaches	Impeach My Bush	Guitar on "Give 'er"
2007	Lupe Fiasco	The Cool	Guitar on "Hello / Goodbye (Uncool)"
2007	Goon Moon	Licker's Last Leg	Performer
2007	Jesse Malin	Glitter in the Gutter	Additional guitar on "Tomorrow Tonight"
2007	Unkle	War Stories	Vocals on "Restless", guitar on "Chemistry" and "Hold My Hand"
2008	Unkle	End Titles... Stories for Film	Featured on "Chemical"
2008	Primal Scream	Beautiful Future	Guitar on "Necro Hex Blues"
2009	Biffy Clyro	Only Revolutions	Additional guitar on "Bubbles"
2009	Nosfell	Nosfell	backing vocals on "Bargain Healers"
2011	Arctic Monkeys	Suck It and See	backing vocals on "All My Own Stunts"
2011	Boots Electric	Honkey Kong	guitar on "Boots Electric Theme" and "Dreams"
2011	Screaming Trees	Last Words: The Final Recordings	guitar on "Crawlspace"
2012	Mark Lanegan	Blues Funeral	Guitar on "Riot in My House"
2012	Florence and the Machine	MTV Unplugged	
2012	Mondo Generator	Hell Comes To Your Heart	Guest musician
2013	Various Artists	Sound City: Real to Reel	Composer and primary artist on "Centipede", "A Trick With No Sleeve" and "Mantra"
2013	Arctic Monkeys	AM	Backing vocals on "One for the Road" and "Knee Socks"
2016	Iggy Pop	Post Pop Depression	Provided vocals, guitar, bass, piano, synthesizers, mellotron and percussion
2016	Lady Gaga	Joanne	Guitar on various tracks and songwriting for various tracks
2019	Various Artists	The Music of Red Dead Redemption 2 (Original Soundtrack)	Vocals on "Cruel World"
2020	Run the Jewels	RTJ4	Provided vocals, and participated in the production
2021	Paul McCartney	McCartney III Imagined	"Lavatory Lil" (Josh Homme version)
2022	Ozzy Osbourne	Patient Number 9	Guitar on "God Only Knows"
2022	Nikki Lane	Denim & Diamonds	Provided guitar, keyboards and drums
2026	Mastodon	Marrow Deep	Guest vocals on "Snakes for Dinner"
2026	Shania Twain	Little Miss Twain	Guest vocals on "Faded Blue Jeans"
