= Brendon McNichol =

- Born: Joseph Brendon McNichol; September 2, 1961 (age 64)
- Genres: Stoner rock; hard rock; alternative rock
- Instruments: Guitar; piano; bass
- Years active: 1990–present
- Formerly of: Queens of the Stone Age; Masters of Reality; Rattlebone

Joseph Brendon McNichol (born September 2, 1961) is an American multi-instrumentalist, best known as a member of Queens of the Stone Age and Masters of Reality. He has also contributed to recordings by the Desert Sessions, played with artists and bands such as K.C. and the Sunshine Band, Stacey Q., Pablo Moses, Michigan and Smiley, Charlie Chaplan, Drone with Ted Parsons, Levi Chen, Photek, Discordia, the Dwarves, Palmerville, and appeared on multiple soundtracks, commercials and albums as a session player.

== Career ==
As a member of Rattlebone, McNichol released a 5-song EP in 1992 produced by Dave Jerden. In 1996, he joined Masters of Reality, led by Chris Goss, and toured with the band, appearing on the 1997 live album How High The Moon: Live At The Viper Room. In 2000, McNichol joined Queens of the Stone Age, teaming up with longtime friend Josh Homme, as a guitarist, lap-steel player and keyboardist. The following year, he appeared on the Desert Sessions album Volumes 7 & 8 and the Masters of Reality album Deep in the Hole. In addition to touring with Queens of the Stone Age, McNichol recorded instrumentals for the albums Rated R and Songs for the Deaf before his departure from the band in 2002.

In 2003, McNichol played on the Roxy Saint live/video album The Underground Personality Tape. The following year, McNichol co-wrote and contributed instrumentals to three songs on the Masters of Reality album Give Us Barabbas. In 2005, he appeared on the Queens of the Stone Age live/video album Over the Years and Through the Woods in video footage from their tour in support of Rated R. In 2009, McNichol co-wrote and played bass on one track from the Masters of Reality album Pine/Cross Dover, in addition to touring with the band in support of the album.

== Discography ==
Year	Artist	Title	Song(s)
1992	Rattlebone	Rattlebone	
1997	Stacey Q	Boomerang	"Tara", "Something About You"
1997	Masters of Reality	How High The Moon: Live At The Viper Room	
1997	Levi Chen with Lisa Franco and Michael Masley	Celtic Zen	"Reunity", "The Wind, The Wolf And The Wild", "Baskali", "She Moved Through The Aire", "Animaginal I, II, III", "Knot Zen", "Difinity"
2000	Queens of the Stone Age	Rated R	"Never Say Never", "Who'll Be The Next In Line"
2001	The Desert Sessions	Volumes 7 & 8	"Don't Drink Poison", "Up In Hell", "The Idiots Guide"
2001	Masters of Reality	Deep in the Hole	
2001	Queens of the Stone Age	Alpha Motherfuckers – A Tribute to Turbonegro	"Back To Dungaree High"
2002	Queens of the Stone Age	This Is Where I Belong – The Songs of Ray Davies & The Kinks	"Who'll Be The Next In Line"
2002	Queens of the Stone Age	Songs for the Deaf	"Go with the Flow"
2003	Roxy Saint	The Underground Personality Tape	
2004	Masters of Reality	Give Us Barabbas	"Off To Tiki Ti", "Hey Diana", "I Walk Beside Your Love"
2005	Queens of the Stone Age	Over the Years and Through the Woods	"Better Living Through Chemistry", "Auto Pilot", "How to Handle a Rope"
2009	Masters of Reality	Pine/Cross Dover	"Alfalfa"
