= Gamma Ray (EP) =

EP by Gamma Ray, later Queens of the Stone Age

EP by Gamma Ray
- Released: 1996
- Studios: Ironwood Studios, Seattle
- Genre: Stoner rock
- Length: 8:37
- Label: Man's Ruin (MR 036)
- Producers: Josh Homme, Chris Goss

Queens of the Stone Age chronology
Gamma Ray (1996)	Kyuss / Queens of the Stone Age (1997)

Gamma Ray is the debut EP by Gamma Ray, a musical project by former Kyuss guitarist Josh Homme, released in 1996 by Man's Ruin Records. After the breakup of Kyuss in 1995, Homme recorded the Gamma Ray material in Seattle with producer Chris Goss, and drummer Victor Indrizzo. Screaming Trees bassist Van Conner played bass on the track "If Only Everything", and former Kyuss singer John Garcia contributed backing vocals to the track "Born to Hula". After the release of the EP, Homme received a cease and desist order because the name Gamma Ray was already in use by a German power metal band. He changed the name of the project to Queens of the Stone Age, and both of the Gamma Ray tracks were re-released the following year by Man's Ruin on the Kyuss / Queens of the Stone Age split EP, which featured some of the final studio recordings by Kyuss and debuted the "Queens of the Stone Age" moniker for Homme's new project. The split EP also included a third track from the Gamma Ray recording sessions, "Spiders and Vinegaroons".

Both tracks from the Gamma Ray EP were later re-recorded by Queens of the Stone Age. "If Only Everything" was re-recorded under the shortened title "If Only" for Queens of the Stone Age's debut album in 1998, while "Born to Hula" was re-recorded and appeared as a B-side on "The Lost Art of Keeping a Secret" single from the band's 2000 album Rated R.

== Track listing ==
All tracks are written by Josh Homme

Side A
No.	Title	Length
1.	"If Only Everything"	3:32

Side B
No.	Title	Length
2.	"Born to Hula"	5:05
Total length:		8:37

== Personnel ==
Credits adapted from the EP's liner notes.

- Josh Homme – vocals, guitar, bass guitar on "Born to Hula", mixing engineer, producer
- Van Conner – bass guitar on "If Only Everything"
- Vic "The Stick" Indrizzo – drums
- John Garcia – backing vocals on "Born to Hula"
- Chris Goss – producer
- Floyd – recording engineer
- Jay – recording engineer
