= Feel Good Hit of the Summer =

2000 single by Queens of the Stone Age

Single by Queens of the Stone Age

from the album Rated R
- Released: November 27, 2000
- Recorded: 2000
- Genre: Stoner rock; punk rock
- Length: 2:43
- Label: Interscope
- Songwriters: Josh Homme; Nick Oliveri
- Producers: Josh Homme; Chris Goss

Queens of the Stone Age singles chronology
"The Lost Art of Keeping a Secret" (2000)	"Feel Good Hit of the Summer" (2000)	"No One Knows" (2002)

Audio sample
- "Feel Good Hit of the Summer": file; help

"Feel Good Hit of the Summer" is a song by American rock band Queens of the Stone Age and written by band members Josh Homme and Nick Oliveri. It is the opening track of their second album, Rated R, and the second single to be released from it. The song also accompanied the UK release of the album on a separate CD entitled Rated U. Judas Priest vocalist Rob Halford, at the time fronting his solo band, contributed backing vocals on the song. Upon the album's release, "Feel Good Hit of the Summer" had particular attention drawn to it due to the song's focus on drugs. Despite this, critical reception to the song was generally positive, with various critics considering it a highlight of the album.

== Background and writing ==
Josh Homme claimed the song was conceived after his three-day Millennium party. The song's lyrics are merely a list of drugs repeated throughout. The drugs listed in the verses are nicotine, Valium, Vicodin, marijuana, ecstasy and alcohol, with cocaine mentioned throughout the chorus. Homme has hinted that the song is a direct reference to the band's stoner rock label:

["Feel Good Hit of the Summer"] might be like a knife in the neck of stoner rock. It's hard to tell, and I think that's the good part about it. Look, you're always going to get labeled with something. Stoner rock is kind of a dumbing-down label, and that's why I don't gravitate toward it.

On multiple occasions, Homme has also referred to the song as a "social experiment" in regards to how the public would approach it. He has also stated that despite the heavy drugs content in the track, the band's stance was left ambiguous, stating that "there's no endorsement" and that "[the song] doesn't say yes or no". Chris Goss, who co-produced Rated R with Homme under the pseudonym The 5:15ers, later stated that the track was intended to be a "joke" and a "funny song". He also commented that it was originally recorded as a chant at the end of the album, but its effectiveness resulted in its expansion into a full song and usage as the opener.

Though it was Josh Homme who provided lead vocals, there are several other vocalists present on the track. Judas Priest lead singer Rob Halford was in a neighbouring studio when this song was first recorded and ended up singing backing vocals at the band's request, calling the lyrics a "rock and roll cocktail". Halford's performance was only used in the final chorus of the track, though this was enough to have him credited alongside Nick Oliveri, Wendy Ray Moan and Nick Eldorado as providing backing vocals. The song features again on Rated R as a reprise after the eighth track "In the Fade".

== Reception ==
Due to the frequency and blatant nature of the drug references in "Feel Good Hit of the Summer", a number of radio stations refused to play it. Wal-Mart initially refused to sell Rated R unless the song was removed from the album or a warning label placed upon it, though the band successfully argued that the cover and name of the album were warnings in themselves.

Critically, the song fared well and was chosen as a highlight of Rated R by The Guardian, Robert Christgau, and numerous others. In reference to the song, NME said in their review of the album that "Among modern American rock moments, it stands alongside "Smells Like Teen Spirit" or RATM's "Killing in the Name", such is its irresistible, instant impact", also labelling it an "anthem". Rolling Stone similarly likened the track to "unreleased Nirvana". Steve Huey of Allmusic wasn't so taken with the song, branding it "tiresome" and chastising its usage for a reprisal.

"Feel Good Hit of the Summer" was featured in a number of prominent end-of-year lists for best song, including Robert Christgau's Pazz & Jop critics poll which placed the song at number 26. It also reached number six on NME's list, two places below fellow Rated R single "The Lost Art of Keeping a Secret". The song was also included on the CD release of the Triple J Hottest 100 for 2000, despite not featuring on the actual list. In October 2011, NME placed it at number 82 on its list "150 Best Tracks of the Past 15 Years". Louder Sound and Kerrang both named it the fifth-best Queens of the Stone Age song.

== Legacy ==
The band reprise the track on their follow-up to Rated R, Songs for the Deaf, following the song "A Song for the Deaf". Though the music sounds similar, the lyrics are replaced by rhythmic laughing (it was entitled Feel Good Hit of Haha). Queens of the Stone Age have frequently performed "Feel Good Hit of the Summer" live since the release of Rated R and whilst touring subsequent albums. On the band's tour for their 2007 album Era Vulgaris, the song was extended with numerous jams and new segments frequently taking it past the six-minute mark. It was on this tour that the band used the track as the opener for what was intended to be a six-song gig at an undisclosed Los Angeles rehab clinic. Due to the song's lyrics, the set was cut short and the band were escorted from the premises by security. "Feel Good Hit of the Summer" is used in videos by the Colorado Police Department to demonstrate the dangers of drunk driving, one of two Queens of the Stone Age tracks to be used in such a way (the other being "Better Living Through Chemistry" which is used in a similar way by the San Diego County Sheriff's Office).

"Feel Good Hit of the Summer" was used in the 2000 film Book of Shadows: Blair Witch 2, with the track also being included on its soundtrack release. Alternative rock band Yourcodenameis:milo performed a version of the track on the cover album Higher Voltage, given away free with issue 1164 of Kerrang! magazine. The song has also been covered live by Placebo, Foo Fighters and Machine Head. Rap duo Atmosphere entitled a drug themed song off their 2009 EP Leak at Will, "Feel Good Hit of the Summer Part 2" in reference to this track. Atmosphere member Slug had previously stated his appreciation of Queens of the Stone Age.

== Artwork ==
The single's cover art features the title spelled out with various drugs, many of which are mentioned within the song. The song also heavily influenced the choices made for the title, cover and accompanying booklet of Rated R. Themes included drugs and censorship, with the MPAA's rating system targeted specifically. Continuing as such, the album's liner notes contain several worded warnings for each song, akin to parents' guides most commonly seen on the covers for DVDs. Those listed for "Feel Good Hit of the Summer" include 'Adult Situations, 'Consumption' and 'Illegal Substances', referencing the drug-related content of the song. All of this would seem portentous considering the controversy the track subsequently caused.

== Music video ==
A screenshot of the music video

The video also puts significant focus on the subject of the song. Created as an animation, it has a loose plot following a man driving under what appears to be the influence of some form of hallucinogenic drug. This is demonstrated by colour becoming more varied and vibrant in the song's chorus, with numerous literal representations of drugs featured throughout. The band are also shown performing the song through the technique of rotoscoping, which they would again use in the video for their 2003 single "Go with the Flow". The video culminates in the man's vehicle driving off into the distance and exploding into a mushroom cloud upon reaching the horizon.

== Track listing ==
All tracks by Joshua Homme and Nick Oliveri, except where noted.

No.	Title	Writer(s)	Length
1.	"Feel Good Hit of the Summer"		2:43
2.	"Never Say Never" (Romeo Void cover)	Benjamin Bossi, Debora Iyall, Frank Zincavage, Larry Carter, Pete Woods	4:22
3.	"You're So Vague" (A spoof of Carly Simon's hit "You're So Vain")		3:40
4.	"Who'll Be the Next in Line" (The Kinks cover)	Ray Davies	2:29
5.	"Feel Good Hit of the Summer" (CD-ROM Video)		2:43
Total length:			15:57

As part of Record Store Day 2010, the band allowed the single to be released on vinyl for the first time. The record is a 10" picture disc and contains all the songs available on the European and Australian release.

== Personnel ==
Personnel taken from Rated R CD booklet.

- Joshua Homme – guitar, lead vocals
- Nick Oliveri – bass, backing vocals
- Gene Trautmann – drums
- Dave Catching – electric piano, lap steel
- Rob Halford – backing vocals
- Wendy Ray Moan – backing vocals
- Nick Eldorado – backing vocals
- Chris Goss – grand piano, percussion

== Charts ==
Chart (2001)	Peak position
Australia (ARIA) with "The Lost Art of Keeping a Secret"	75

Chart (2010)	Peak position
UK Physical Singles Sales (Official Charts Company)	39
