= The Lost Art of Keeping a Secret =

- Cover of European 7" and UK CD 1

Single by Queens of the Stone Age

from the album Rated R
- Released: August 7, 2000
- Genre: Alternative rock; hard rock
- Length: 3:36
- Label: Interscope
- Songwriters: Josh Homme; Nick Oliveri
- Producers: Josh Homme; Chris Goss

Queens of the Stone Age singles chronology
| "If Only" (1998) | "The Lost Art of Keeping a Secret" (2000) | "Feel Good Hit of the Summer" (2000) |

Alternative covers
- Cover of UK CD 2

"The Lost Art of Keeping a Secret" is the first single from Queens of the Stone Age's second album, Rated R. It was released in the summer of 2000 through Interscope Records in Europe as a standard single, and in the United States as only a promotional one. The track's music video received mild airplay on music television. It was also the only single from Rated R to get a chart position, reaching number 21 on the Mainstream Rock charts, number 36 on the Modern Rock charts and number 31 on the UK Singles Chart.

The song was featured in the films Sound City and Smokin' Aces 2: Assassins' Ball, the TV series Numbers, Nip/Tuck, Entourage and Daria, and in the video games Tony Hawk: Ride, Driver: San Francisco and Gran Turismo 5.

== Reception ==
"The Lost Art of Keeping a Secret" is widely regarded as one of the band's best songs. In 2016, Louder Sound ranked the song number three on their list of the 10 greatest Queens of the Stone Age songs, and in 2021, Kerrang ranked the song number one on their list of the 20 greatest Queens of the Stone Age songs.

== Track listings ==
All tracks by Joshua Homme and Nick Oliveri, except where noted.

=== Europe ===
- 7" 497 387-7
- CD 497 410-2
1. "The Lost Art of Keeping a Secret" - 3:36
2. "Ode to Clarissa" - 2:40

=== UK ===
- CD 1 497 391-2
1. "The Lost Art of Keeping a Secret" - 3:36
2. "Born to Hula" (Homme) - 5:52
  - A re-record of the song previously released on the Gamma Ray EP and the Kyuss / Queens of the Stone Age split EP.
3. "The Lost Art of Keeping a Secret" (CD-ROM Video) - 3:36
- CD 2 497 392-2
1. "The Lost Art of Keeping a Secret" - 3:36
2. "Ode to Clarissa" - 2:40
3. "Monsters in the Parasol" (Live in Seattle) (Homme, Mario Lalli) - 3:32

== Personnel ==
Personnel taken from Rated R CD booklet.

- Josh Homme – lead vocals, guitar
- Nick Oliveri – bass, backing vocals
- Nick Lucero – drums
- Pete Stahl – backing vocals
- Dave Catching – electric piano
- Barrett Martin – vibes
- Scott Mayo – baritone sax
- Chris Goss – "noise" piano

== Charts ==
Chart performance for "The Lost Art of Keeping a Secret"
| Chart (2000) | Peak position |
|---|---|
| Australia (ARIA) with "Feel Good Hit of the Summer" | 75 |
| Scotland Singles (OCC) | 35 |
| UK Singles (OCC) | 31 |
| UK Rock & Metal (OCC) | 2 |
| US Mainstream Rock (Billboard) | 21 |
| US Alternative Airplay (Billboard) | 36 |

== Certifications ==
| Region | Certification | Certified units/sales |
|---|---|---|
| United Kingdom (BPI) Sales since 2004 | Silver | 200,000^{‡} |
^{‡} Sales+streaming figures based on certification alone.
