= First It Giveth =

Single by Queens of the Stone Age

from the album Songs for the Deaf
- Released: August 18, 2003
- Recorded: 2002
- Genre: Stoner rock; hard rock
- Length: 3:18
- Label: Interscope
- Songwriters: Josh Homme; Nick Oliveri
- Producers: Josh Homme; Eric Valentine

Queens of the Stone Age singles chronology
"Go with the Flow" (2003)	"First It Giveth" (2003)	"Little Sister" (2004)

"First It Giveth" is a song by American rock band Queens of the Stone Age from their album Songs for the Deaf. It was released as a single on August 18, 2003, peaking at number 33 on the UK Singles Chart. The song is about the role drugs play in the process of making music. When asked in an interview if it is easier to make music on drugs, Josh Homme said "Well I think we have a song that about this subject called First they Giveth, then They Taketh away, and I think at first you can draw inspiration and then eventually, it negates any inspiration."

"The Lord Gave, and the Lord Hath Taken Away" is a bible quotation found in the Book of Job (Job 1:21). It has become altered to a popular idiom generally used out of Job's context, "The Lord giveth, and the Lord taketh away" (2). This in turn became, "First it giveth, then it taketh away."

== Music video ==
The music video for "First It Giveth" shows the band playing live at the Glastonbury Festival and on their tour with the Red Hot Chili Peppers in 2002. There are also some backstage scenes included. It is famous among fans for showing Nick Oliveri playing naked on stage. It was directed by Nigel Copp.

== Track listing ==
=== UK disc 1 ===
1. "First It Giveth" – 3:18
2. "Wake Up Screaming" (Subhumans cover) – 4:58
3. "You Think I Ain't Worth a Dollar, But I Feel Like a Millionaire" (Troy mix) – 2:14

=== UK disc 2 ===
1. "First It Giveth" – 3:18
2. "The Most Exalted Potentate of Love" (The Cramps cover) – 2:46
3. "Song for the Deaf" (The Blind Can Go Get Fucked remix) – 5:02
4. "First It Giveth" (CD-ROM video)

The B-sides, "Wake Up Screaming" and "The Most Exalted Potentate of Love", appeared subsequently on the compilation EP Stone Age Complications.

== Charts ==
Chart performance for "First It Giveth"
Chart (2003)	Peak position
Australia (ARIA)	83
UK Singles (OCC)	33
