= Welcome to the Western Lodge =

Studio album by Masters of Reality
- Released: 1999
- Genres: Hard rock; alternative rock; stoner rock
- Length: 38:39
- Labels: Brownhouse; Spitfire
- Producer: Chris Goss

Masters of Reality chronology
How High the Moon: Live at the Viper Room (1997)	Welcome to the Western Lodge (1999)	Deep in the Hole (2001)

Welcome to the Western Lodge is the third studio album by the American rock band Masters of Reality, released in 1999.

== Production ==
The album was produced by Chris Goss at his Monkey Studios. Goss played all of the guitar parts.

== Critical reception ==
Professional ratings
Review scores
Source	Rating
AllMusic	2/5 stars
The Encyclopedia of Popular Music	4/5 stars

Sound & Vision wrote that the album "rides the buzz and fuzz that [Goss] gave Queens of the Stone Age as co-producer of Rated R."

== Track listing ==
All tracks are written by Chris Goss, except where noted.

No.	Title	Writer(s)	Length
1.	"It's Shit"		2:56
2.	"Moriah"		3:33
3.	"The Great Spelunker"		3:10
4.	"Time to Burn"	Goss, John Leamy, Dave Catching	2:36
5.	"Take a Shot at the Clown"	Goss, Leamy, Catching	3:52
6.	"Baby Mae"		3:14
7.	"Why the Fly?"		4:00
8.	"Ember Day"		0:54
9.	"Annihilation of the Spirit"		2:32
10.	"Calling Dr. Carrion"		3:22
11.	"Boymilk Waltz"		2:36
12.	"Lover's Sky"	Goss, John Russo	2:55
13.	"Also Ran Song"	Goss, Leamy	2:59
Total length:			38:39

== Personnel ==
- Chris Goss – vocals, guitar, keyboards, bass
- John Leamy – drums, keyboards, bass

Additional personnel

- Googe – bass on "Baby Mae"
- Victor Indrizzo – drums on "Baby Mae"
