= Deep in the Hole =

Deep in the Hole may refer to:

- "Deep in the Hole" (song), a 1983 song by AC/DC
- Deep in the Hole (album), a 2001 album by Masters of Reality\
