= Give Us Barabbas =

Studio album by Masters of Reality
- Released: June 15, 2004
- Recorded: Mid-1990s
- Genre: Hard rock; stoner rock
- Length: 41:27
- Label: Brownhouse
- Producer: Chris Goss

Masters of Reality chronology
Flak 'n' Flight (2003)	Give Us Barabbas (2004)	Pine/Cross Dover (2009)

Professional ratings
Review scores
Source	Rating
Allmusic	3.5/5 stars

Give Us Barabbas is the fifth studio album of the American rock band Masters of Reality, released in 2004.

Material for the album comes from sessions for a planned release on Epic Records in the mid 1990s entitled The Ballad of Jody Frosty, which was shelved at the time, hence the change in line-up. The recording coincides with the live album How High the Moon, released in 1997.

== Track listing ==
All tracks are written by Chris Goss, except where noted.

No.	Title	Writer(s)	Length
1.	"The Ballad of Jody Frosty"		7:30
2.	"Voice and the Vision"		3:38
3.	"I Walk Beside Your Love"	Chris Goss, Chris Palmer, Brendon McNichol	2:55
4.	"Bela Alef Rose"		3:28
5.	"Brown House on the Green Road"		3:35
6.	"Hey Diana"	Goss, Palmer, McNichol	3:07
7.	"Still on the Hill"		1:16
8.	"The Desert Song"	Goss, Ginger Baker, Daniel Rey, Googe	3:34
9.	"Off to Tiki Ti"	Goss, Palmer, McNichol	2:31
10.	"It's So Hard"	John Lennon	2:29
11.	"Jindalee Jindalie"		4:27
12.	"Don't Get Caught by the Huntsman's Bow"		2:57
Total length:			41:27

== Credits ==
- Chris Goss – vocals, guitar, keyboard
- Googe – bass guitar
- Victor Indrizzo – drums

Additional personnel

- Chris Palmer – drums ("It's So Hard")
- Ginger Baker – drums ("The Desert Song")
- Scott Weiland – guest vocals ("Jindalee Jindalie")
- Lily Haydn – violin ("Brown House on the Green Road")
- Andy Kaulkin – electric piano ("Brown House on the Green Road")
- Brendon McNichol – mandolin and balalaika guitar ("Off To Tiki Ti", "Hey Diana", "I Walk Beside Your Love")
