= Masters of Reality (album) =

Studio album by Masters of Reality
- Released: 1989
- Studio: Atlantic, Chung King and Platinum Isle, New York City, Sound City, Los Angeles
- Genre: Hard rock; stoner rock
- Length: 40:55
- Label: Def American
- Producer: Rick Rubin

Masters of Reality chronology
| Masters of Reality (1989) | Sunrise on the Sufferbus (1992) |

1990 edition cover

Masters of Reality is the debut album by Masters of Reality, released in 1989 on Def American. Due to the artwork on the cover, the original release is sometimes referred to as The Blue Garden.

A reissue was released on June 19, 1990, on the Delicious Vinyl label. The reissue had a new cover, a change in song sequence and the addition of the song "Doraldina's Prophecies". Delicious Vinyl would reissue the album again in 2012 on deluxe compact disc and vinyl, bundled with the live album How High the Moon: Live at the Viper Room.

The track "The Blue Garden" is sampled on Lemon Jelly's track "'88 aka Come Down on Me" on their 2005 album '64–'95.

== Critical reception ==
Professional ratings
Review scores
| Source | Rating |
|---|---|
| AllMusic | 4.5/5 stars |
| Collector's Guide to Heavy Metal | 10/10 |
| Hi-Fi News & Record Review | A:1* |
| Kerrang! | 5/5 stars |
| Rolling Stone | 3/5 stars |

The Orange County Register called the album "a surprisingly winning pastiche of Cream, ZZ Top, and Neil Young."

== Track listings ==
All tracks are written by Chris Goss and Tim Harrington.

| No. | Title | Length |
|---|---|---|
| 1. | "Theme for the Scientist of the Invisible" | 1:30 |
| 2. | "Domino" | 3:46 |
| 3. | "The Blue Garden" | 4:22 |
| 4. | "Gettin' High" | 3:09 |
| 5. | "The Candy Song" | 3:21 |
| 6. | "Magical Spell" | 5:03 |
| 7. | "The Eyes of Texas" | 3:20 |
| 8. | "Sleep Walkin'" | 3:33 |
| 9. | "Lookin' to Get Rite" | 3:06 |
| 10. | "John Brown" | 3:37 |
| 11. | "Kill the King" | 7:34 |

1990 re-release
| No. | Title | Length |
|---|---|---|
| 1. | "Candy Song" |
| 2. | "Doraldina's Prophecies" |
| 3. | "John Brown" |
| 4. | "Gettin' High" |
| 5. | "Magical Spell" |
| 6. | "Theme for the Scientist of the Invisible" |
| 7. | "Domino" |
| 8. | "The Blue Garden" |
| 9. | "The Eyes of Texas" |
| 10. | "Lookin' to Get Rite" |
| 11. | "Kill the King" |
| 12. | "Sleep Walkin'" |

== Personnel ==
Band members

- Chris Goss – vocals, guitar
- Tim Harrington – lead guitar
- Googe – bass
- Vinnie Ludovico – drums

Additional musicians

- Mr. Owl – additional keyboards

Production

- Rick Rubin – producer
- Matt Dike, Michael Ross, Chris Goss – additional production on 1990 edition
- David Bianco – engineer, mix engineer
- Steve Ett – engineer
- Brian Jenkins – assistant engineer
- John Leamy – cover painting
