= Kyuss / Queens of the Stone Age =

EP by Kyuss and Queens of the Stone Age
- Released: December 5, 1997
- Recorded: March 1–20, 1995
- Studios: Rancho De La Luna, Joshua Tree, California (Kyuss); Ironwood Studios, Seattle (Queens of the Stone Age)
- Genre: Stoner rock
- Length: 33:51
- Label: Man's Ruin
- Producer: Chris Goss

Kyuss chronology
...And the Circus Leaves Town (1995)	Kyuss / Queens of the Stone Age (1997)	Muchas Gracias: The Best of Kyuss (2000)

Queens of the Stone Age chronology
Gamma Ray (1996)	Kyuss / Queens of the Stone Age (1997)	The Split CD (1998)

Professional ratings
Review scores
Source	Rating
AllMusic	2.5/5 stars
Collector's Guide to Heavy Metal	6/10
Kerrang!	5/5 stars

Kyuss / Queens of the Stone Age is a split EP by American rock bands Kyuss and Queens of the Stone Age, released in December 1997 on Man's Ruin Records. It features some of the final studio recordings by Kyuss while debuting former Kyuss guitarist Josh Homme's next project, Queens of the Stone Age.

== Overview ==
Five of the EP's six tracks were previously released. Kyuss' cover version of the Black Sabbath song "Into the Void" had been released as a single by Man's Ruin in 1996 after the band had already broken up, with "Fatso Forgotso" as its B-side. "Fatso Forgotso Phase II" had been released under the title "Flip the Phase" in 1995 as the B-side of the "One Inch Man" single. "Fatso Forgotso" and "Fatso Forgotso Phase II (Flip the Phase)" were later included on the compilation album Muchas Gracias: The Best of Kyuss, released in 2000.

The Queens of the Stone Age tracks "If Only Everything" and "Born to Hula" had been released by Man's Ruin in 1996 on the Gamma Ray 7". Homme initially chose the name Gamma Ray for this new band but received a cease and desist order from a German band who were already using the name. The band name was subsequently changed to Queens of the Stone Age, a nickname given to Kyuss years earlier by their producer, Chris Goss. An alternate recording of "If Only Everything" was included on Queens of the Stone Age's debut album in 1998 under the shortened title "If Only", while an alternate recording of "Born to Hula" appeared as the B-side of "The Lost Art of Keeping a Secret" single from the band's 2000 album Rated R. "Spiders and Vinegaroons" would later be included on the 2011 re-release of Queens of the Stone Age's debut album.

== Track listing ==
All tracks are written by Josh Homme, except where noted

Kyuss
No.	Title	Writer(s)	Length
1.	"Into the Void" (Black Sabbath cover)	Tony Iommi, Geezer Butler, Ozzy Osbourne, Bill Ward	8:00
2.	"Fatso Forgotso"	Scott Reeder	8:33
3.	"Fatso Forgotso Phase II (Flip the Phase)"		2:17

Queens of the Stone Age
No.	Title	Length
4.	"If Only Everything"	3:32
5.	"Born to Hula"	5:05
6.	"Spiders and Vinegaroons"	6:24
Total length:		33:51

== Personnel ==
Credits adapted from the EP's liner notes.

Kyuss

- John Garcia – vocals
- Josh Homme – guitar
- Scott Reeder – bass
- Alfredo Hernández – drums

Queens of the Stone Age

- Josh Homme – vocals (tracks 4 and 5), bass (track 5), guitar (track 6)
- Van Conner – bass (track 4)
- Vic "The Stick" Indrizzo – drums
- John Garcia – backing vocals (track 5)
- Chris Goss – "other stuff" (track 6)

Production

- Billy Bizeau – recording engineer (track 1)
- Fred Drake – recording engineer (tracks 1–3), mixing engineer (track 1)
- Josh Homme – mixing engineer (tracks 2–6), producer (tracks 4–6)
- Patrick "Hutch" Hutchinson – mixing engineer (tracks 2 and 3)
- Chris Goss – producer (tracks 4–6)
- Floyd – recording engineer (tracks 4–6)
- Jay – recording engineer (tracks 4–6)

Artwork

- Frank Kozik – designed the album cover and sleeve assembly
