= Rattlebone =

- Also known as: The Drills (1985–1992)
- Origin: Hollywood, Los Angeles, California, United States
- Genres: heavy metal; hard rock
- Years active: 1991–1996
- Labels: Hollywood
- Website: www.rattlebone.com

Rattlebone was an American punk/hard rock band formed in Los Angeles, California, United States, in 1992. The group was signed by label president Peter Paterno at Hollywood Records that same year. They recorded two albums with veteran producer Dave Jerden, who has also worked with bands such as Jane's Addiction, Alice in Chains, and The Offspring. Only an initial, self-titled EP was released to the public.

The band started as The Drills out of Florida before that group relocated to Los Angeles and eventually was renamed. The solidified Rattlebone lineup signed to Hollywood Records included Roger Deering on vocals and bass, Kerry Furlong on drums, Jeff Muendel on Hammond organ, and Brendon McNichol on guitar.

Rattlebone toured the United States extensively from 1992 to 1995, including opening slots for Motörhead and Blue Öyster Cult. During this period, the group was managed by Don Arden. With the exit of Paterno from their label, the band soon thereafter lost their contract.

In 1994, Greg Birribauer replaced guitarist Brendon McNichol. The band was dissolved in 1995.
