= Sunrise on the Sufferbus =

Studio album by Masters of Reality
- Released: 1992
- Genre: Hard rock; blues rock; stoner rock
- Length: 42:26
- Label: Chrysalis
- Producer: Chris Goss, Ginger Baker, Googe

Masters of Reality chronology
Masters of Reality (1989)	Sunrise on the Sufferbus (1992)	How High the Moon: Live at the Viper Room (1997)

Professional ratings
Review scores
Source	Rating
AllMusic	4.5/5 stars
Christgau's Consumer Guide	(3-star Honorable Mention)
Rolling Stone	4/5 stars

Sunrise on the Sufferbus is the second studio album by American rock band Masters of Reality, released in 1992.

On the album, the band was joined by British drummer Ginger Baker.

== Track listing ==
All tracks are written by Chris Goss, except where noted.

No.	Title	Writer(s)	Length
1.	"She Got Me (When She Got Her Dress On)"		2:47
2.	"J.B. Witchdance"	Ginger Baker, Goss	3:37
3.	"Jody Sings"		3:03
4.	"Rolling Green"		3:41
5.	"Ants in the Kitchen"	Ginger Baker, Goss	3:22
6.	"V.H.V"	Googe, Goss	4:21
7.	"Bicycle"		0:47
8.	"100 Years (Of Tears on the Wind)"		4:06
9.	"T.U.S.A"	Ginger Baker, Googe, Goss, Daniel Rey	2:59
10.	"Tilt-A-Whirl"		3:42
11.	"Rabbit One"		3:33
12.	"Madonna"		0:38
13.	"Give Me Water"	Ginger Baker, Goss	2:23
14.	"Moon in Your Pocket"		3:31
Total length:			42:26

== Personnel ==
- Chris Goss – vocals, guitars, keyboards
- John Envieveri (Googe) – bass, backing vocals
- Ginger Baker – drums, backing vocals and lead vocals on the track "T.U.S.A."
- Additional co-production by Daniel Rey and Jason Corsaro
