= Pine Cross Dover =

Pine/Cross Dover

Studio album by Masters of Reality
- Released: August 24, 2009
- Genre: Hard rock; stoner rock
- Length: 51:50
- Label: Brownhouse
- Producer: Chris Goss

Masters of Reality chronology
Give Us Barabbas (2004)	Pine/Cross Dover (2009)	The Archer (2025)

Professional ratings
Review scores
Source	Rating
Allmusic	3.5/5 stars

Pine/Cross Dover is the sixth studio album by American rock band Masters of Reality. It was released in 2009. The album consists of two halves; tracks 1–5 make up "Pine", and tracks 6–11 make up "Cross Dover".

== Track listing ==
All tracks are written by Chris Goss, except where noted.

Part One 'Pine'
No.	Title	Writer(s)	Length
1.	"King Richard TLH"	Goss, Dave Catching	4:20
2.	"Absinthe Jim and Me"		3:03
3.	"Worm in the Silk"	Goss, John Leamy	4:24
4.	"Always"	Goss, Leamy	3:24
5.	"Johnny's Dream"	Goss, Leamy	4:38

Part Two 'Cross Dover'
No.	Title	Writer(s)	Length
6.	"Up in It"		3:44
7.	"Dreamtime Stomp"		4:00
8.	"Rosie's Presence"		3:13
9.	"The Whore of New Orleans"	Goss, Leamy	4:43
10.	"Testify to Love"	Goss, Aidan Lavelle, Pablo Clements, James Griffith, Philip Sheppard	4:17
11.	"Alfalfa"	Goss, Leamy, Mark Christian, Brendon McNichol	12:08
Total length:			51:50

== Credits ==
- Chris Goss – vocals, guitars, bass, keyboards
- John Leamy – drums, keyboards, guitars

=== Additional personnel ===
- Dave Catching – additional guitars ("Absinthe Jim and Me", "Worm in the Silk", "Johnny's Dream", "Up in It", "Dreamtime Stomp" and "Rosie's Presence")
- Brian O'Connor – bass ("King Richard TLH", "Absinthe Jim And Me", "Johnny's Dream" and "Rosie's Presence")
- Mark Christian – guitar ("The Whore of New Orleans" and "Alfalfa")
- Brendon McNichol – bass ("Alfalfa")
- Mike Lowry – drums ("Testify to Love")
- Pablo Clements – additional engineering ("Testify to Love")
