= No One Knows =

2002 single by Queens of the Stone Age

Single by Queens of the Stone Age

from the album Songs for the Deaf
- B-side: "A Song for the Dead" (live); "Avon" (live); "Gonna Leave You" (Spanish); "Tension Head" (live); UNKLE remix
- Released: November 26, 2002
- Recorded: 2001
- Genre: Stoner rock; alternative rock; hard rock; boogie rock; blues rock
- Length: 4:38 (album version); 4:13 (radio edit)
- Label: Interscope
- Songwriters: Josh Homme; Mark Lanegan
- Producers: Josh Homme; Eric Valentine

Queens of the Stone Age singles chronology
"Feel Good Hit of the Summer" (2000)	"No One Knows" (2002)	"Go with the Flow" (2003)

Audio sample
- file; help

Music video
- Queens Of The Stone Age - "No One Knows" (Official Music Video) on YouTube

"No One Knows" is a song by American rock band Queens of the Stone Age, written by band members Josh Homme and Mark Lanegan. It is the first single and second track from their third album, Songs for the Deaf, and was released on November 26, 2002. "No One Knows" was a chart success, becoming the band's first single to chart on the Billboard Hot 100 and their only single to top the US Alternative charts. The song was also critically acclaimed, receiving a nomination for Best Hard Rock Performance at the 2003 Grammy Awards.

== Background and writing ==
According to Homme, "No One Knows" existed before the recording sessions for Songs for the Deaf:

We have patience with music, a year or five years down the road it may kind of rewrite itself and become what it's supposed to be. There's two songs on this record that are over five years old, you know? "God Is in the Radio" and "No One Knows".

Recording for Songs for the Deaf began in March 2002 at three studios across California. Though the liner notes credit Homme and Eric Valentine with producing the majority of the album – including "No One Knows" – Homme credits Valentine with merely recording the beginning of the album for contractual reasons.

== Reception ==
"No One Knows" has received critical acclaim from critics. In The Guardian review of Songs for the Deaf, Dave Simpson said "'No One Knows' has killer riffs to spare". Playlouder were similarly enthused, calling the song "soulful, like the last gasp of the hero in an old western". Eric Carr of Pitchfork called it an "easy groove" and "four-to-the-floor slime of the highest quality".

"No One Knows" was awarded the number one position on Australian national radio station Triple J's annual Hottest 100 2002, with four other Queens of the Stone Age tracks also charting. The March 2005 edition of Q magazine placed it at number 70 in its list of the 100 Greatest Guitar Tracks, saying of the song, "Possibly the only full-on, legs akimbo guitar great to be based around a rhythm that goes oompah-oompah, here Josh Homme joined the ranks of the immortal." In September 2006, it was placed at number 13 on NME's list of the 50 Greatest Tracks Of The Decade. Rolling Stone placed "No One Knows" at number 97 on their list of the 100 Greatest Guitar Songs of All Time, saying of the track, "QOTSA guitarist and overall mastermind Josh Homme found the sweet spot between hooky hard rock and the pulverizing metal he'd grown up playing." The song was listed at number eleven on the 2002 Pazz & Jop list, a survey of several hundred music critics conducted by Robert Christgau.

"No One Knows" was nominated for Best Hard Rock Performance at the 2003 Grammys and was the band's first, but they lost the award to Foo Fighters for "All My Life", which was credited to Dave Grohl, who was filling in as the drummer for Queens of the Stone Age.

In 2011, NME placed it at number 18 on its list, "150 Best Tracks of the Past 15 Years". In 2013, "BBC 6 Music" placed it at number 16 on its "6 music's greatest hits" voted for by over 100,000 listeners. To celebrate the twentieth anniversary of its "Hottest 100" poll, Australian radio station Triple J ran a "Hottest 100 of the last 20 years" poll in June 2013. Songs that were released between 1994 and 2012 were eligible for the poll and "No One Knows" was voted into eleventh position. In 2014, NME placed it at number 99 on its list of the "500 Greatest Songs of All Time". In 2016, Louder Sound ranked the song number one on their list of the 10 greatest Queens of the Stone Age songs, and in 2021, Kerrang ranked the song number two on their list of the 20 greatest Queens of the Stone Age songs.

== Chart performance ==
"No One Knows" was released as a single on November 26, 2002 and became the most successful single from Songs for the Deaf. The song's peak placings of number one, number five and number 51 on the US Modern Rock, US Mainstream Rock (where it lasted for twenty-eight weeks) and the Billboard Hot 100 charts respectively remain the highest of the band's career. "No One Knows" is also the band's highest charting single on the Dutch Singles Chart (where it reached number 39) and on the Irish Singles Chart (where it peaked at number 26). It reached number 15 on the UK Singles Chart.

It was voted number one in Australia's Triple J Hottest 100 countdown for 2002.

== Music video ==
The first half of the single's music video was shot in June, with the filming of the next half taking place the next month. Josh Homme has said Michel Gondry's style was chosen because he "did all those videos for Björk and we're huge fans of Björk, so we're excited".

The video is split into two sections and switches between them throughout. The first has band members Homme, Nick Oliveri and Mark Lanegan driving a truck at night, whereupon they hit a deer. When they get out to inspect, the deer proceeds to attack them before going on a rampage in their International Scout, with the three band members tied to the hood of the car. The deer's rampage only stops when it falls in love with a doe statue decorating a garden, proceeding to make love with it after mounting the heads of the band members on the wall like trophies. The second section of the video is of Homme, Oliveri, Troy Van Leeuwen and Dave Grohl performing the song against a black background.

"No One Knows" received heavy rotation on music video channels culminating in a nomination for the MTV2 Award at 2003 MTV Video Music Awards, where it lost to AFI for "Girl's Not Grey".

It is common belief that Gondry directed the video with Dean Karr. However, on Reddit, Karr has said that Gondry's credit as co-director was a misprint.

== Subsequent recordings ==
"No One Knows" has been covered by numerous groups, including The Section Quartet on their 2007 album, Fuzzbox, and Franco Saint de Bakker, with the song appearing on their 2004 release Live At The Ancienne Belgique. It was also covered by Razorlight as part of Jo Whiley's Live Lounge Tour on September 26, 2008. The Divine Comedy often covered "No One Knows" at live shows and one such performance appears on their 2004 DVD, Live at the Palladium. British DJ and producer Mark Ronson also covered the song as a B-side to his single "Stop Me", featuring Domino Kirke on vocals, and it later charted in the UK by itself. Ronson subsequently produced Queens of the Stone Age's 2017 studio album Villains. The Vaccines released their cover version in January 2021.

The song was the first Queens of the Stone Age track to be remixed by British musical outfit Unkle. The "No One Knows" remix appeared as a B-side on the follow-up single, "Go with the Flow", as well as on the EP Stone Age Complication.

== Track listing ==
German CD, UK release CD-1

1. "No One Knows" (Josh Homme, Mark Lanegan)
2. "A Song for the Dead" (live from The Mean Fiddler, Soho, London, England) (Homme, Lanegan)
3. "Avon" (live from The Mean Fiddler, Soho, London, England) (Homme)
4. "No One Knows" (multimedia track) (Homme, Lanegan)

UK release CD-2

1. "No One Knows" (Homme, Lanegan)
2. "Gonna Leave You" (Spanish version) (Homme, Nick Oliveri)
3. "Tension Head" (live from The Mean Fiddler, Soho, London, England) (Homme, Oliveri)

European 7"

1. "No One Knows" (Homme, Lanegan)
2. "Tension Head" (live from The Mean Fiddler) (Homme, Oliveri)

Canadian CD

1. "No One Knows (album version)"
2. "No One Knows (UNKLE reconstruction – radio edit)"
3. "No One Knows (UNKLE reconstruction – full-length)"
4. "No One Knows (UNKLE reconstruction – instrumental)"
5. "No One Knows" (multimedia track)

All songs by Homme, Lanegan

== Personnel ==
Personnel taken from No One Knows liner notes.

Queens of the Stone Age

- Josh Homme – lead guitar, vocals
- Nick Oliveri – bass guitar
- Dave Grohl – drums

Additional musicians

- Dean Ween – guitar
- Ana and Paz Lenchantin – strings

== Charts ==
Chart (2002–2003)	Peak position
Ireland (IRMA)	26
Italy (FIMI)	27
Netherlands (Dutch Top 40)	39
Netherlands (Single Top 100)	39
Scottish Singles Sales (Official Charts)	14
UK Singles (Official Charts)	15
UK Rock & Metal (Official Charts)	1
US Billboard Hot 100	51
US Alternative Airplay (Billboard)	1
US Mainstream Rock (Billboard)	5

== Certifications ==
Region	Certification	Certified units/sales
Brazil (Pro-Música Brasil)	Gold	30,000^{‡}
Denmark (IFPI Danmark)	Gold	45,000^{‡}
Italy (FIMI)	Gold	35,000^{‡}
New Zealand (RMNZ)	3× Platinum	90,000^{‡}
Spain (Promusicae)	Gold	30,000^{‡}
United Kingdom (BPI)	Platinum	600,000^{‡}
^{‡} Sales+streaming figures based on certification alone.

== Accolades ==
Year	Publication	Country	Accolade	Rank
2019	The Guardian	United Kingdom	Dave Grohl's Landmark Songs	N/A
