= Masters of Reality =

American rock band

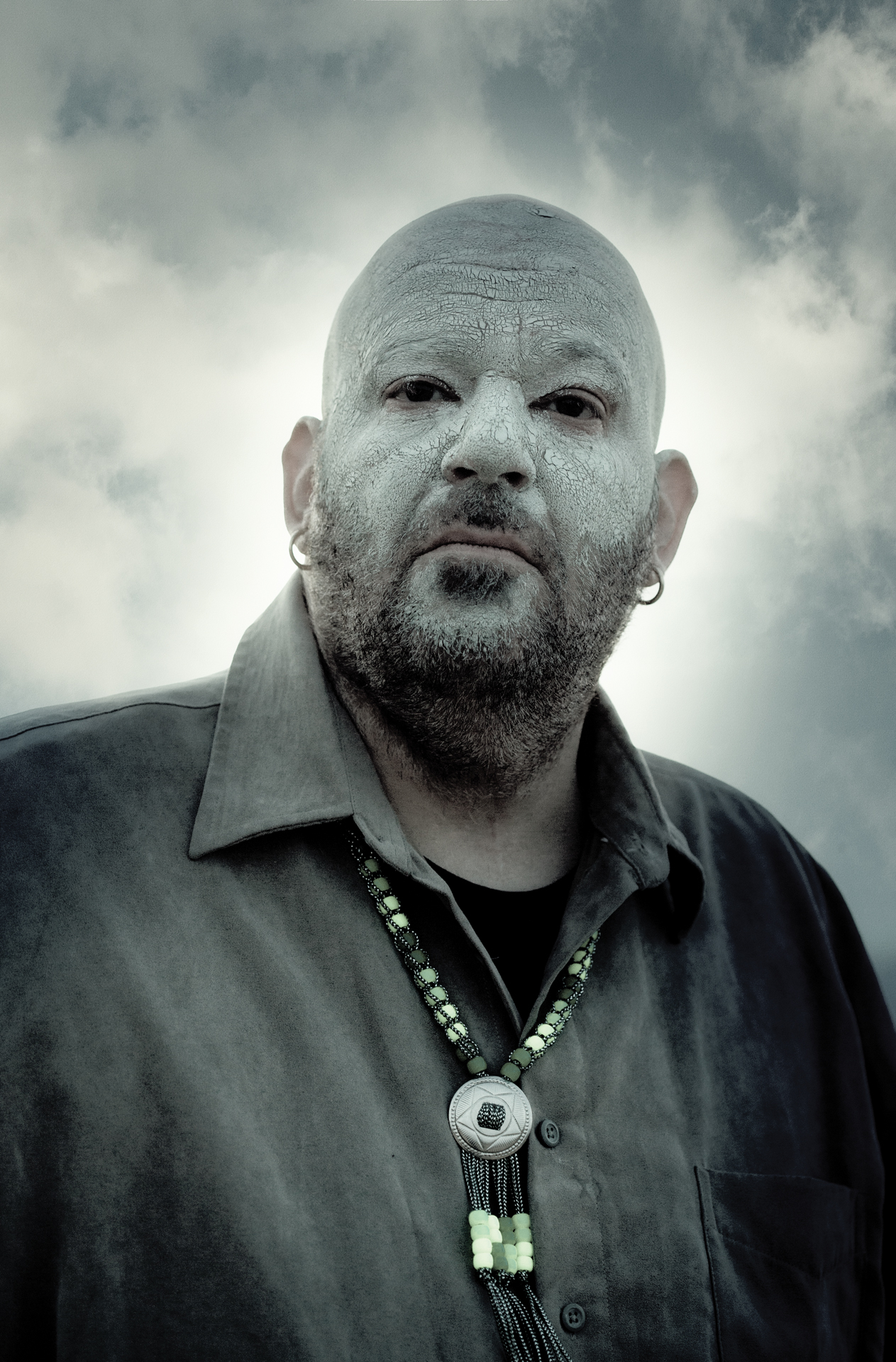
- Lead singer Chris Goss in 2010

Background information
- Origin: Syracuse, New York, U.S.
- Genres: Hard rock; stoner rock; blues rock; desert rock
- Years active: 1981–present
- Labels: Def American; Brownhouse; Chrysalis
- Members: Chris Goss; John Leamy; Paul Powell
- Website: mastersofreality.com

Masters of Reality is an American rock band formed in 1981 by frontman Chris Goss and guitarist Tim Harrington in Syracuse, New York, United States. They took the name for the band from a misprinted label of the third Black Sabbath album, Master of Reality. Goss has remained the only constant band member. Since the release of their self-titled debut album in 1989, Masters of Reality has released seven studio albums so far.

The band's music has touched on many styles, ranging from hard rock to blues, from progressive rock to Beatlesque pop music. The band is sometimes associated with the "Palm Desert Scene", which includes bands like Kyuss, Queens of the Stone Age and many other stoner rock and "desert rock" bands.

== History ==
Frontman Chris Goss started out with a band covering heavy 1970s rock acts (New York Dolls, Aerosmith, David Bowie, Blue Öyster Cult, Alice Cooper, Led Zeppelin) and writing his own songs since circa 1975. After getting into punk rock for a while (performing at CBGB in 1978), he did not play guitar for a few years, instead preferring electronic music like Kraftwerk and becoming a club DJ.

In 1981 Goss and Tim Harrington started to make experimental home recordings with lo-fi, cheap and/or borrowed equipment that included a Sanyo boombox Rhythm Ace drum machine, a Korg, synthesizers and a Fender Vibroverb amp. The rhythm tracks of synths and a beat recorded on cassette would be played back to "overdub" vocals, guitar, more synthesizers, et cetera. They considered Manson Family as a name for their act, but never actually used it for their performances. They played regularly at CBGB with a sound reminiscent of Suicide or somewhat like how Nine Inch Nails or Marilyn Manson would sound in the 1990s.

Early original songs included "Building the Kingdom", "Voodoo Doll", "Metal Entity", "Cash", "Anchor", "Stones in Every Field" and "Doraldina's Prophecies".

Masters of Reality grew into a four-piece with the addition of Googe (bass) and Vinnie Ludovico (drums) and developed a sound with less electronics and more heavy blues rock with influences like Black Sabbath, Cream, Led Zeppelin and King Crimson. A demo tape reached producer Rick Rubin who went to see a live show in late 1986 and then signed the band to Def Jam. Rubin brought out the blues rock character of the band Rubin quit Def Jam but took the band with him to his new Def American label, before their self-titled debut album was eventually released in 1989.

The band appears briefly in the 1990 film Marked for Death (starring Steven Seagal).

Goss got frustrated with the band while touring the debut album. He quit the tour after Matt Dike invited him to come to Los Angeles and to get signed to his Delicious Vinyl label. They bought the rights from Rubin and released a newly sequenced version of the album with "Doraldina's Prophecies" as an extra track.

In 1992 Goss and Googe resurfaced, now with Ginger Baker (formerly of Cream) on drums. The new album Sunrise on the Sufferbus spawned a Top 10 rock chart hit with the single "She Got Me (When She Got Her Dress On)". An album cut sometimes used by American radio shows when they have a British guest is "T.U.S.A.", a rap by Baker describing the inability of Americans to make a proper cup of tea.

Baker left the band after a few years and was replaced by Victor Indrizzo (of Circus of Power and Samiam).

Masters of Reality recorded the song "Climb Inside My World" for a 1994 Ren & Stimpy episode entitled "Jerry the Bellybutton Elf". The song was written by Steve Mellor who also wrote the episode in which it appeared.

Masters of Reality recorded a full studio album entitled The Ballad of Jody Frosty for Epic that was scheduled to be released in 1995, but it was shelved. One song appeared on the live album How High the Moon (1997) and some of the studio recordings were released on Give Us Barabbas (2004). The full album was eventually leaked online in 2004.

Masters of Reality were quiet for several years as Goss was occupied producing music for other bands. However, the band did appear at Johnny Depp's Viper Room night club in 1997 for a two-night stand, and a resultant live album, How High the Moon featured Stone Temple Pilots vocalist Scott Weiland on "Jindalee Jindalie".

In 1999 the band released Welcome to the Western Lodge. Goss' connection to Queens of the Stone Age resulted in the collaborative album Deep in the Hole in 2001, and two years later, in the release of the subsequent live album Flak 'n' Flight.

In 2003, the band covered the song "Devil's Radio" for the album Songs from the Material World: A Tribute to George Harrison.

The band released its fifth album, Give Us Barabbas, in 2004, a collection of lost tracks opening with the "Ballad of Jody Frosty".

On August 24, 2009, the band released Pine/Cross Dover.

Masters of Reality's seventh album, and its first in 16 years, The Archer, was released on April 11, 2025.

== Influences ==
Masters of Reality cited influences including Led Zeppelin, the Beatles, the Rolling Stones, David Bowie and Yes.

== Members ==
"Masters Of Reality will always be a project with alternating lineups. (...) I can't afford paying people to tell they're in the band." – Chris Goss in 2002

May 2024 European Tour:

- Chris Goss (vocals, guitar)
- Alain Johannes (guitar)
- John Leamy (drums)
- Paul Powell (bass guitar)

Spring 2015 European Tour:

- Chris Goss (vocals, guitar)
- John Leamy (drums)
- Paul Powell (bass guitar)
- Josh Urist (guitar, keyboards)

Summer 2013 European Tour:

- Chris Goss (vocals, guitar, keyboard)
- John Leamy (drums)
- Mathias Schneeberger (keyboards)
- Paul Powell (bass guitar)
- Dave Catching (guitar)

late 2010 US/UK Pine/Cross Dover tour:

- Chris Goss (vocals, guitar, keyboard)
- John Leamy (drums)
- Mathias Schneeberger (keyboards)
- Abby Travis (bass guitar)
- Dave Catching (guitar)

Previous lineups included:

- Tim Harrington (duo and first band lineup)
- Googe (first band lineup) (appears on Masters of Reality, Sunrise on the Sufferbus, How High the Moon, Give Us Barabbas bass, keyboards and cannoli
- Vinnie Ludovico (first band lineup) (appears on Masters of Reality
- Mr. Owl [Al Dunn] (additional keyboards on Masters of Reality)
- Ginger Baker (appears on Sunrise on the Sufferbus)
- John Leamy (appears on Welcome to the Western Lodge, Deep in the Hole, Flak 'n' Flight, Pine/Cross Dover)
- Josh Homme (appears on Deep in the Hole, Flak 'n' Flight)
- Nick Oliveri (appears on Deep in the Hole, Flak 'n' Flight)
- Mark Lanegan (appears on Deep in the Hole, Flak 'n' Flight)
- Brendon McNichol
- Liam O'Malley (bass guitar)
- Paul Powell

== Discography ==
=== Studio albums ===
- 1989 – Masters of Reality
- 1992 – Sunrise on the Sufferbus
- 1999 – Welcome to the Western Lodge
- 2001 – Deep in the Hole
- 2004 – Give Us Barabbas
- 2009 – Pine/Cross Dover
- 2025 – The Archer

=== Live albums ===
- 1997 – How High the Moon: Live at the Viper Room
- 2003 – Flak 'n' Flight

=== Charted singles ===
Song	Rock	Billboard Hot 100	Album
"She Got Me (When She Got Her Dress On)"	8	—	Sunrise on the Sufferbus
