= Flak 'n' Flight =

Live album by Masters of Reality
- Released: February 18, 2003
- Recorded: November–December 2001
- Genre: Hard rock; stoner rock
- Length: 71:31
- Label: Brownhouse
- Producer: Chris Goss

Masters of Reality chronology
Deep in the Hole (2001)	Flak 'n' Flight (2003)	Give Us Barabbas (2004)

Professional ratings
Review scores
Source	Rating
AllMusic	4/5 stars

Flak 'n' Flight is the second live album by American rock band Masters of Reality, released on February 18, 2003. It was recorded during the band's European tour in 2001 from November to December.

== Reception ==
In 2005, Flak 'n' Flight was ranked number 449 in Rock Hard magazine's book The 500 Greatest Rock & Metal Albums of All Time.

== Track listing ==
All tracks are written by Chris Goss, except where noted.

No.	Title	Writer(s)	Length
1.	"Opening" (excerpt from "The Ballad of Jody Frosty")		1:19
2.	"Deep in the Hole"	Goss, John Leamy	4:24
3.	"Third Man on the Moon"	Goss, Leamy	6:16
4.	"Why the Fly?"		10:56
5.	"Time to Burn"	Goss, Leamy, Dave Catching	3:28
6.	"The Blue Garden"	Goss, Tim Harrington	7:28
7.	"Rabbit One"		9:10
8.	"Also Ran Song"	Goss, Leamy	3:22
9.	"John Brown"	Goss, Harrington	7:44
10.	"100 Years (Of Tears on the Wind)"		6:54
11.	"High Noon Amsterdam"	Goss, Leamy	3:45
12.	"She Got Me (When She Got Her Dress On)"		4:40
13.	"Cretin Hop" (Ramones cover)		2:45
Total length:			71:31

== Credits ==
- Chris Goss – vocals, guitar, synthesizers
- John Leamy – drums, vocals
- Josh Homme – guitar, vocals
- Nick Oliveri – bass, vocals

=== Additional personnel ===
- Mark Lanegan – vocals on "High Noon Amsterdam"
