= Go with the Flow =

Single by Queens of the Stone Age

from the album Songs for the Deaf
- Released: April 7, 2003
- Recorded: 2002
- Genre: Stoner rock; hard rock
- Length: 3:07
- Label: Interscope
- Songwriters: Josh Homme; Nick Oliveri
- Producers: Josh Homme; Eric Valentine

Queens of the Stone Age singles chronology
| "No One Knows" (2002) | "Go with the Flow" (2003) | "First It Giveth" (2003) |

Audio sample
- file; help

"Go with the Flow" is a song by Queens of the Stone Age from the album Songs for the Deaf, released as a single on April 7, 2003. It is the only single from the album to not feature Dave Grohl on drums, instead featuring Gene Trautmann who left the band during the recording of the album. At the 46th Annual Grammy Awards, the song was nominated for Best Hard Rock Performance.

== Music video ==
The music video for the song was filmed in England by Shynola. At the 2003 MTV Video Music Awards, it won Best Special Effects and was nominated for Best Art Direction and Breakthrough Video. The video—rendered in black, white, and red—features the band performing at the back of a Chevrolet pickup truck driving through a desert highway. The video also has sexual themes such as a metaphor of two cars colliding with each other, symbolizing intercourse, and an image of a bident (like the one on the cover of the album) showing some erotic attributes.

== Reception ==
"Go with the Flow" is widely regarded as one of the band's best songs. In 2016, Louder Sound ranked the song number six on their list of the 10 greatest Queens of the Stone Age songs, and in 2021, Kerrang ranked the song number four on their list of the 20 greatest Queens of the Stone Age songs.

== Track listings ==
UK CD 1
| No. | Title | Writer(s) | Length |
|---|---|---|---|
| 1. | "Go with the Flow" (album version) | Josh Homme, Nick Oliveri | 3:07 |
| 2. | "No One Knows" (UNKLE reconstruction remix radio edit) | Homme, Mark Lanegan | 4:42 |
| 3. | "Hangin' Tree" (live at the Melkweg in Amsterdam on June 24, 2002) | Homme, Alain Johannes | 3:26 |
| 4. | "Go with the Flow" (CD-ROM video) | Homme, Oliveri |

UK CD 2

1. "Go with the Flow" (album version)
2. "Regular John" (live; Melkweg in Amsterdam on 24 June 2002)
3. "Do It Again" (live; Melkweg in Amsterdam on 24 June 2002)

Australian special edition

1. "Go with the Flow" (album version)
2. "Avon" (live; The Mean Fiddler, London, on June 25, 2002)
3. "No One Knows" (Lavelle remix radio edit version)
4. "No One Knows" (CD-ROM video)

Dutch edition

1. "Go with the Flow" (album version)
2. "Avon" (live; The Mean Fiddler on June 25, 2002)
3. "No One Knows" (UNKLE Reconstruction radio edit)
4. "No One Knows" (CD-ROM video)

UK 12"

1. "Go with the Flow" (album version)
2. "No One Knows" (UNKLE reconstruction vocal version)

The 12" is pressed on clear vinyl.

== Personnel ==
Personnel taken from the Go with the Flow single.

- Josh Homme – guitar, lead vocals
- Nick Oliveri – bass guitar, background vocals
- Gene Trautmann – drums

== Charts ==
| Chart (2003) | Peak position |
|---|---|
| Australia (ARIA) | 39 |
| Ireland (IRMA) | 43 |
| Netherlands (Single Top 100) | 50 |
| Scottish Singles Sales (Official Charts) | 22 |
| UK Singles (Official Charts) | 21 |
| UK Rock & Metal (Official Charts) | 3 |
| US Bubbling Under Hot 100 Singles (Billboard) | 16 |
| US Alternative Airplay (Billboard) | 7 |
| US Mainstream Rock (Billboard) | 24 |

== Certifications ==
| Region | Certification | Certified units/sales |
|---|---|---|
| New Zealand (RMNZ) | Platinum | 30,000^{‡} |
| United Kingdom (BPI) | Platinum | 600,000^{‡} |
^{‡} Sales+streaming figures based on certification alone.
