= Stone Age Complication =

EP by Queens of the Stone Age
- Released: October 4, 2004
- Recorded: 1998–2002
- Genre: Hard rock
- Length: 24:33
- Label: Interscope
- Producer: Queens of the Stone Age

Queens of the Stone Age chronology
Songs for the Deaf (2002)	Stone Age Complication (2004)	Lullabies to Paralyze (2005)

Professional ratings
Review scores
Source	Rating
AllMusic	3.5/5 stars

Stone Age Complication is an EP by Queens of the Stone Age containing six B-sides and covers.

== Track listing ==
Lead vocals by Josh Homme, except where noted.
No.	Title	Writer(s)	Lead vocals	Length
1.	"Who'll Be the Next in Line" (The Kinks cover)	Ray Davies	Nick Oliveri	2:31
2.	"Wake Up Screaming" (Subhumans cover)	Subhumans	Oliveri	5:03
3.	"No One Knows (UNKLE Remix)"	Josh Homme, Mark Lanegan		4:37
4.	"Most Exalted Potentate of Love" (The Cramps cover)	The Cramps		2:46
5.	"Born to Hula" (2000 version)	Homme		5:55
6.	"The Bronze"	Homme		3:41
Total length:				24:33
