= Queens of the Stone Age (album) =

Studio album by Queens of the Stone Age
- Released: September 22, 1998
- Recorded: April 3–21, 1998
- Studios: Monkey (Palm Desert); Rancho De La Luna (Joshua Tree)
- Genres: Desert rock; stoner rock; hard rock; alternative metal
- Length: 46:27
- Labels: Loosegroove; Roadrunner; Man's Ruin
- Producer: Josh Homme

Queens of the Stone Age chronology
The Split CD (1998)	Queens of the Stone Age (1998)	Rated R (2000)

Alternative cover
- Original LP record release and 2022 reissue cover

Queens of the Stone Age is the debut studio album by American rock band Queens of the Stone Age, released on September 22, 1998, through Loosegroove Records in the United States, Roadrunner Records internationally, and Man's Ruin Records on vinyl. It was primarily written and recorded in April 1998 by founding member Josh Homme and his former Kyuss bandmate Alfredo Hernández, with Hernández playing drums and Homme singing and playing the rest of the instruments. Homme also produced the album alongside Joe Barresi. Bassist Nick Oliveri, also a former member of Kyuss, would join the band by the time of the album's release. Queens of the Stone Age received generally positive reviews from critics, who placed it in the stoner rock genre and drew comparisons to krautrock bands such as Neu! and Can, as well as to Kyuss and other metal bands.

In 2011, Homme reissued Queens of the Stone Age through his Rekords Rekords label, having it remastered and adding three additional tracks–two from the album's recording sessions and one from two years earlier. The reissue received a positive critical response and was accompanied by a supporting concert tour. Working on the reissue and subsequent tour also inspired part of the band's approach to recording its sixth album, ...Like Clockwork, released in 2013. In 2022, the album was reissued again on Matador Records with its original LP artwork.

== Background and recording ==
Following the breakup of Kyuss in 1995, guitarist Josh Homme recorded new material in Seattle with producer Chris Goss, bassist Van Conner, and drummer Victor Indrizzo under the name Gamma Ray. The results, including the song "If Only Everything", were released as the Gamma Ray EP in 1996. Homme subsequently toured as a guitarist with Screaming Trees and started The Desert Sessions, a series of jam sessions involving many musicians including former Kyuss drummer Alfredo Hernández. The song "Avon" originated from the Desert Sessions, appearing on Volume 3 in 1998. After receiving a cease and desist order because the name Gamma Ray was already in use by a German band, Homme changed the name to Queens of the Stone Age. The Gamma Ray material was re-released in 1997 on the Kyuss / Queens of the Stone Age split EP, along with the additional track "Spiders and Vinegaroons" from the Gamma Ray sessions; the release featured some of the final studio recordings by Kyuss while debuting the "Queens of the Stone Age" moniker for Homme's new project.

Reflecting on this period in 2011, Homme remarked:

I just remember thinking I hadn't played for about a year and I started writing songs. The first song I wrote was "Regular John", which is the first song on the album, and I remember thinking "no-one's playing this trance rock music that you can dance to", but that's primarily because I hadn't heard bands like Can. I thought I could try to do this thing that hadn't really been done, and then I found out it had kind of been done but not very much. You just kind of try to carve your own space. I just wanted to start a band that within three seconds of listening, people knew what band it was.

The first ten tracks on Queens of the Stone Age were recorded in April 1998 at Monkey Studios in Homme's hometown of Palm Desert, California. Hernández played drums on the tracks and Goss performed on "You Would Know" and "Give the Mule What He Wants", playing bass guitar and singing backing vocals. Homme sang lead vocals and played the rest of the instruments on the recordings, crediting himself under the pseudonym "Carlo" for his bass guitar, keyboard, and piano work. He also served as a producer on the album, alongside Joe Barresi. The Gamma Ray song "If Only Everything" was re-recorded during these sessions and its title shortened to "If Only", and the Desert Sessions song "Avon" was also re-recorded. "I Was a Teenage Hand Model" was recorded separately at Rancho De La Luna in Joshua Tree, California, with the studio's personnel contributing as performers: studio owner Fred Drake sang and played drums, co-owner Dave Catching played percussion, and sound engineer Patrick "Hutch" Hutchinson played piano. Former Dinosaur Jr. bassist Mike Johnson is credited with "sofa" on the track. Hutch, who served as live sound engineer for both Kyuss and Queens of the Stone Age, is credited as a member of the group on the album, with the roles "FOH" (front of house), "guru", "HardWalls", and "back of door".

The album's recordings were mixed by Barresi and mastered by Dan Hersch at DigiPrep in Hollywood. The image for the album cover was taken from the 1972 book The Pin-Up: A Modest History by Mark Gabor, featuring Trinidadian-British model Sylvia Bayo. Photographs for the liner notes were taken by Tony Tornay, while the back cover photograph was taken by rock photographer Lisa Johnson; it shows Hernández, Homme, and former Kyuss bassist Nick Oliveri, the latter of whom joined Queens of the Stone Age just prior to the album's release and would remain with the band until 2004. Oliveri also appears in the album's closing moments, in a recorded answering machine message to Homme in which he agrees to join the band. Homme created the layout for the album's packaging with graphic artist Frank Kozik.

== Critical reception ==
Professional ratings (original release)
Review scores
Source	Rating
AllMusic	4/5 stars
Entertainment Weekly	B−
NME	8/10
Q	4/5 stars
Rolling Stone	4/5 stars
The Rolling Stone Album Guide	4/5 stars
Spin	7/10
The Village Voice	(dud)

Queens of the Stone Age received generally positive reviews from critics. Writing for NME, reviewer Kitty Empire scored it 8 out of 10, comparing it to Kyuss and saying that "for all its indisputable primitive charms, Queens of the Stone Age is actually a step forward in stoner evolution. The guitars are still flint-hard, the tunes still load-bearing. But the sound roaring out of the speakers is far sleeker and more hypnotic than the dumb chug that stoner rock has periodically devolved into in Homme's absence. The excellent 'Regular John' sounds almost motorik, as though Neu! had level billing with [Black] Sabbath one strange night. There are keyboards and maracas on the very un-stone age 'I Was a Teenage Hand Model'. And Homme—who didn't sing in Kyuss—frequently swaps his bone-dry metallic tones for something a little more soulful on songs like 'You Can't Quit Me Baby'." Tom Sinclair of Entertainment Weekly gave it a B− rating, remarking that the band "delivers a workmanlike collection of heavy music that's just a bit too cerebral to fall under the stoner rock rubric (Fu Manchu). Queens of the Stone Age is intermittently potent, but when you hear the ripped-off 'If Only' (a.k.a. the Stooges' 'I Wanna Be Your Dog'), you can't help but think QOTSA might be a great band—if only they could write a song that good on their own."

James Hunter of Rolling Stone gave the album four stars out of five and commented that the band had "found a vital place between art-metal seriousness and pop pleasure. It begins right away with the trancelike 'Regular John', a track that layers Homme's yelping guitar accents over a fuzzy groove. While other metalheads play around with sequencers, Queens of the Stone Age have something a little more heated and classical in mind. The rest of the album charges on with its compelling contrasts between Homme's papery vocals and the surrounding rampage. Sometimes the songs explore pure heaviness, as on the wall-rattling 'Walkin' on the Sidewalks'. But more often they thrillingly toy with elements like vocal hooks ('You Would Know') and metal frenzy ('How to Handle a Rope') without giving in to either." Writing in Spin, Joe Gross scored Queens of the Stone Age 7 out of 10, saying "While there's really nothing in this collection worth trading in those Melvins albums for, it's strangely compelling to hear how Homme and his cohorts killed many an afternoon in a thick THC haze with Can's Tago Mago, then worked it into their patented pedal abuse."

Reviewing the album after Queens of the Stone Age had gained mainstream success with 2000's Rated R and 2002's Songs for the Deaf, Stephen Thomas Erlewine of AllMusic remarked: "Hearing Queens of the Stone Age's long out of print debut many years after its initial 1998 release does pack the shock of revelation: Josh Homme's tightly wound blueprint for QOTSA was in place from the very beginning. [...] There is sex and swagger to Queens of the Stone Age, there's a swing to the rhythms, there's a darkly enveloping carnal menace buttressed by muscle and lust that keeps the album from being an insular stoner headpiece. Certainly, there's enough sinewy force to suggest the mighty brawn of Rated R and Songs for the Deaf; Homme retained enough of the desert spaciness of Kyuss to give Queens of the Stone Age an otherworldly shimmer, a hazy quality he later abandoned for aggressive precision, so this winds up as a unique record in his catalog, a place where you can hear Homme's past and future intertwining." Critic Robert Christgau viewed the album negatively, however, rating it a "dud" in his Consumer's Guide column for The Village Voice.

Queens of the Stone Age was eventually certified silver in the United Kingdom in February 2006, for sales exceeding 60,000 copies. It was listed in the 2010 reference book 1001 Albums You Must Hear Before You Die, the only Queens of the Stone Age album to be included.

== Reissue ==
Following a "deluxe edition" reissue of Rated R in 2010, Homme announced that the band would reissue Queens of the Stone Age as well, stating that the album had become "impossible to get, it'd been outta print for so long. I'm not very nostalgic by nature, so it wasn't like 'guys, remember the days', it was more like in the internet age this record should be able to get got, you know? I really like this band Cheap Trick, and they were doing shows where they were playing their first three records three nights in a row, and so we started talking about 'wow, OK, we'll never get a chance to re-release this thing, and what if we just focused on the first record? I dunno if that means we're going to play it exactly start to finish. We haven't really decided. It's kind of a cool idea. [...] I'm just glad that it's not like some bad haircut when I listen to it. I've listened to it, and I love that record, and it's been really fun to try to put myself back in that headspace where I was just obsessed with trying to trance out on guitar."

The album was remastered by Brian Gardner for the reissue. The title of the song "How to Handle a Rope" was extended to "How to Handle a Rope (A Lesson in the Lariat)", and three additional tracks were added in between the album's existing tracks: "The Bronze" and "These Aren't the Droids You're Looking For", which were from the album's recording sessions and had originally been released in 1998 on The Split CD (a split release with Dutch band Beaver), and "Spiders and Vinegaroons" from the Gamma Ray sessions, which had been released on the Kyuss / Queens of the Stone Age split EP in 1997. The reissue was released through Homme's label, Rekords Rekords, with distribution through Domino Recording Company. The band, which by then consisted of Homme, guitarist Troy Van Leeuwen, bassist Michael Shuman, drummer Joey Castillo, and keyboardist Dean Fertita, scheduled a tour in support of the album's reissue.

Professional ratings (reissue)
Aggregate scores
Source	Rating
Metacritic	78/100
Review scores
Source	Rating
The A.V. Club	B−
Consequence of Sound	B
Drowned in Sound	8/10
Mojo	4/5 stars
Pitchfork	8.0/10
PopMatters	7/10
Rolling Stone	4/5 stars
Uncut	4/5 stars

The re-release prompted a new round of critical reception for Queens of the Stone Age. At Metacritic, which assigns a weighted average score out of 100 to reviews from mainstream critics, the reissue received an average score of 78% based on 10 critics, indicating "generally favorable reviews". Greg Moffitt of BBC Music remarked that "Although less varied and dynamic than Rated R, Queens of the Stone Age simply crackles with energy. At its best, it's just as electrifying, even if it doesn't maintain the dizzying momentum which rolled its follow-up to instant glory. Musically, it draws deeply from diverse pools, echoes of '70s hard rock reverberating alongside alternative, grunge, and stoner rock sounds, the latter of which mainman Josh Homme pioneered with his former band Kyuss." Chuck Eddy of Rolling Stone rated it 4 stars out of 5, saying that "When the debut by Queens of the Stone Age sneaked out in 1998, it seemed like a lark: Josh Homme and Alfredo Hernández from Kyuss, tired of frying sludge metal in the desert sun, were now subjecting reborn acid rock to mechanical repetition. Soon, QOTSA would become a real band, with real hits. But they'd never again groove like this, with gurgling Teutonic drones swallowing Stooges chords and intercepted radio cross talk." For Consequence of Sound, reviewer Karina Halle gave it a B grade and complimented the "very slight hand" of the remastering job: "Comparing the two albums side-by-side, you can hear a nice tonality in the re-release, a sharper, crisper quality that just wasn't holding up in the 1998 version. However, part of QOTSA's vital sound is the thickness of Josh Homme's guitar, the fuzz and grain that permeates from each riff and solo. That is still present, it's just a more precise distortion." She also praised the added tracks, saying "All three of the bonus tracks slink in perfectly with the rest of the album, adding to the overall feel instead of subtracting from it."

For Drowned in Sound, Noel Gardner scored the reissue 8 out of 10, saying that the remastering "has actually made a palpable difference to the plumpness of the bass in songs like 'Hispanic Impressions'", but that the extra tracks "haven't ruined it or anything daft, but also aren't cooking at the level of most of the actual album, and would have been better placed on one of Homme's jam-heavy and 'zany' Desert Sessions releases from the time." Stuart Berman of Pitchfork also scored it 8 out of 10, but praised the added tracks, opining that "It's not often that padding out an already hefty album actually improves it, but in the Queens' case, the revised tracklist provides a more accurate portrait of how the band molded its mercurial Desert Sessions experiments into chiseled hard-rock monoliths. At the same time, the expanded edition makes the Queens' debut feel a little less like a time capsule, and closer in spirit to the playful sprawl of their subsequent best-sellers." In PopMatters, Stuart Branson gave the release 7 stars out of 10, remarking that the added tracks "are worked into the original album sequencing as if they were always there. They provide no revelation, though they do alter somewhat the feel of the album" and concluding that "The best songs are really good; and the other songs sound sort of like their best songs, just slightly less good. And everything remains in this meaty swath of goodness. This rerelease proves that it was always really Homme's personal vision (he even plays bass on this album); it was always sure, and not much has changed." For The A.V. Club, Austin L. Ray graded the reissue a B− and opined that "It's interesting to revisit the band's debut after four more albums and a dozen years, only to find it downright primitive by comparison. [...] It's a kind-of-quaint look at a band that knew what it wanted to do, but hadn't quite figured out how to do it yet. Some songs hint at the tightness the Queens rhythm section would one day embody ('Regular John'), while directionless noodling and farting synths weigh down the otherwise-taut songwriting that would one day manifest itself in pop gems like "The Lost Art of Keeping a Secret" and "No One Knows". All the elements are here, though they're on the darker end of the coal/diamond spectrum, and the mostly unremarkable bonus tracks don't do the set any favors. But when it's good, it's damn good, and through the murk, there's the sound of a band that would one day be truly great."

== Track listing ==
All tracks are written by Josh Homme and Alfredo Hernández, except where noted.

No.	Title	Writer(s)	Length
1.	"Regular John"	Homme, John McBain, Hernandez	4:35
2.	"Avon"	Homme	3:22
3.	"If Only"	Homme	3:20
4.	"Walkin' on the Sidewalks"		5:03
5.	"You Would Know"		4:16
6.	"How to Handle a Rope"		3:30
7.	"Mexicola"	Homme	4:54
8.	"Hispanic Impressions"		2:44
9.	"You Can't Quit Me Baby"		6:34
10.	"Give the Mule What He Wants"		3:09
11.	"I Was a Teenage Hand Model"		5:01
Total length:			46:27

2011 reissue
No.	Title	Writer(s)	Length
1.	"Regular John"	Homme, Hernandez, McBain	4:38
2.	"Avon"	Homme	3:25
3.	"If Only"	Homme	3:23
4.	"Walkin' on the Sidewalks"		5:02
5.	"You Would Know"		4:19
6.	"The Bronze" (from The Split CD, 1998)	Homme	3:45
7.	"How to Handle a Rope (A Lesson in the Lariat)"		3:31
8.	"Mexicola"	Homme	4:56
9.	"Hispanic Impressions"		2:47
10.	"You Can't Quit Me Baby"		6:37
11.	"These Aren't the Droids You're Looking For" (from The Split CD, 1998)	Homme	3:07
12.	"Give the Mule What He Wants"		3:09
13.	"Spiders and Vinegaroons" (from Kyuss / Queens of the Stone Age, 1997)	Homme	6:27
14.	"I Was a Teenage Hand Model"		5:02
Total length:			60:00

== Personnel ==
All credits for Queens of the Stone Age are adapted from the album's liner notes.

Queens of the Stone Age

- Joshua Homme – guitar, vocals; bass, keyboard, piano (credited under the pseudonym "Carlo" for bass, keyboard, and piano); production, packaging
- Alfredo Hernández – drums
- Patrick "Hutch" Hutchinson – piano on "I Was a Teenage Hand Model"; FOH, "Guru", "HardWalls", back of door

Additional performers

- Chris Goss – bass and vocals ("I Was a Teenage Hand Model")
- Fred Drake – drums and vocals ("I Was a Teenage Hand Model")
- Mike Johnson – "sofa" ("I Was a Teenage Hand Model")
- Dave Catching – percussion ("I Was a Teenage Hand Model")

Production

- Joe Barresi – co-production, mixing
- Steve Feldman – engineering assistant ("I Was a Teenage Hand Model")
- Bruce Jacoby – drum tech
- Dan Hersh – mastering engineer

Artwork

- Tony Tornay – photographs
- Lisa Johnson – back cover photograph
- Frank Kozik – packaging

2011 reissue

- Josh Homme – guitar, production ("Spiders and Vinegaroons")
- Chris Goss – clavinet, percussion; production ("Spiders and Vinegaroons")
- Victor Indrizzo – drums ("Spiders and Vinegaroons")
- Brian Gardner – mastering engineer

== Charts ==
=== 2011 re-release ===
Chart (2011)	Peak position
Australian Albums (ARIA)	34
Austrian Albums (Ö3 Austria)	75
Belgian Albums (Ultratop Flanders)	30
Belgian Albums (Ultratop Wallonia)	82
Dutch Albums (Album Top 100)	32
French Albums (SNEP)	138
Irish Albums (IRMA)	99
New Zealand Albums (RMNZ)	25
Scottish Albums (Official Charts)	46
Swiss Albums (Schweizer Hitparade)	80
UK Albums (OCC)	48
US Billboard 200	122

=== 2022 re-release ===
Chart (2022)	Peak position
Australian Albums (ARIA)	22
Dutch Albums (Album Top 100)	27
German Albums (Offizielle Top 100)	18
Irish Albums (IRMA)	91
New Zealand Albums (RMNZ)	23
Scottish Albums (Official Charts)	10
Swiss Albums (Schweizer Hitparade)	25
UK Albums (Official Charts)	42
UK Independent Albums (Official Charts)	6

== Certifications ==
Region	Certification	Certified units/sales
United Kingdom (BPI)	Gold	100,000^{‡}
^{‡} Sales+streaming figures based on certification alone.
