= How High the Moon: Live at the Viper Room =

Live album by Masters of Reality
- Released: June 10, 1997
- Recorded: September 22 & 23, 1996
- Studio: Viper Room, Los Angeles, California
- Genre: Hard rock; blues rock; stoner rock
- Length: 48:58
- Label: Malicious Vinyl
- Producer: Chris Goss, Michael Ross

Masters of Reality chronology
Sunrise on the Sufferbus (1993)	How High the Moon: Live at the Viper Room (1997)	Welcome to the Western Lodge (1999)

Professional ratings
Review scores
Source	Rating
Allmusic	4/5 stars

How High the Moon: Live at the Viper Room is the first live album of the American rock band Masters of Reality, released in 1997.

The album was retitled Reality Show for a European re-release in 2002.

== Track listing ==
All tracks are written by Chris Goss, except where noted.

No.	Title	Writer(s)	Length
1.	"How High the Moon"		1:17
2.	"The Blue Garden"	Goss, Tim Harrington	6:18
3.	"Alder Smoke Blues"		6:21
4.	"Doraldina's Prophecies"	Goss, Harrington	5:16
5.	"She Got Me (When She Got Her Dress On)"		3:24
6.	"Jindalee Jindalie"		4:32
7.	"John Brown"	Goss, Harrington	5:37
8.	"Tilt-A-Whirl/Swingeroo Joe"	Goss, Googe	4:05
9.	"Ants in the Kitchen" / "Goin' Down"	Baker, Goss / Don Nix	7:13
10.	"100 Years (Of Tears on the Wind)"		4:51
Total length:			48:58

== Credits ==
- Chris Goss – Vocals, Guitar
- Googe – Bass
- Victor Indrizzo – Drums, Vocals
- Brendon McNichol – Guitar
- Chris Johnson – Keyboards

=== Additional personnel ===
- Scott Weiland – Vocals on "Jindalee Jindalie"
