= Songs for the Deaf =

2002 studio album by Queens of the Stone Age

Studio album by Queens of the Stone Age
- Released: August 27, 2002
- Recorded: October 2001 – June 2002
- Studios: The Site (San Rafael); Conway (Los Angeles); Barefoot (Hollywood)
- Genres: Stoner rock; hard rock; desert rock; alternative metal; progressive grunge
- Length: 60:53
- Label: Interscope
- Producers: Josh Homme; Eric Valentine; Adam Kasper

Queens of the Stone Age chronology
Rated R (2000)	Songs for the Deaf (2002)	Stone Age Complication (2004)

Singles from Songs for the Deaf
- 1. "No One Knows" Released: November 26, 2002; 2. "Go with the Flow" Released: April 7, 2003; 3. "First It Giveth" Released: August 18, 2003

Songs for the Deaf is the third studio album by the American rock band Queens of the Stone Age, released on August 27, 2002, by Interscope Records. It features many guest musicians, and was the last Queens of the Stone Age album to feature Nick Oliveri on bass. It was also the first Queens of the Stone Age album to feature Dave Grohl on drums, with the second being …Like Clockwork in 2013, where he would feature on half of the track list. Songs for the Deaf is a loose concept album, taking the listener on a drive through the California desert from Los Angeles to Joshua Tree, tuning into radio stations from towns along the way such as Banning and Chino Hills.

Songs for the Deaf received critical acclaim and earned Queens of the Stone Age their first gold certification in the United States. One million copies were sold in Europe, earning a platinum certification from the International Federation of the Phonographic Industry in 2008. "No One Knows", "Go with the Flow" and "First It Giveth" were released as singles.

== Contributors ==
Songs for the Deaf was the first Queens of the Stone Age album that featured Dave Grohl of Nirvana and Foo Fighters on drums, who also toured with the band. He replaced drummer Gene Trautmann, who started working on other projects. Grohl had admired Queens of the Stone Age since they opened for Foo Fighters, and had wanted to appear on their previous album Rated R. Guitarist Josh Homme, with whom he had been friends since 1992 while Homme was the guitarist for Kyuss, invited him to join in October 2000. Grohl admitted that he had not drummed for a long time and added that fronting a band was "tiring".

Songs for the Deaf was the last appearance on a Queens of the Stone Age record by Brendon McNichol (lap steel) and Gene Trautmann (drums). It was also the last album to feature bassist and vocalist Nick Oliveri as a full-time member, as he was fired following the tour. The album also included the first musical contribution to a Queens of the Stone Age album by multi-instrumentalists Natasha Shneider and Alain Johannes. Shneider and Johannes, alongside Songs for the Deaf touring recruits Joey Castillo and Troy Van Leeuwen of Failure and A Perfect Circle would subsequently become full-time Queens of the Stone Age members and contribute to the follow-up album Lullabies to Paralyze, released in 2005.

"No One Knows"
The opening of the album's lead single.

"Go with the Flow"
The chorus of the second single taken from Songs for the Deaf.

"First It Giveth"
The opening of the third single from Songs for the Deaf.

Rounding out the core recording lineup of Homme, Oliveri, and Grohl, was singer/songwriter Mark Lanegan, formerly of Screaming Trees, a band that Homme had toured with previously. Lanegan joined the band as a full-time member in 2001 after having guested on the band's previous album, Rated R, and provided additional songwriting and lyrics, in addition to lead vocals on several songs.

This is the last album by the band that featured three different lead singers in a live and recording format with songs sung by singer/guitarist Homme, bassist/vocalist Oliveri, and Lanegan.

== Production ==
Several songs on the album are reworked versions of tracks previously recorded and released in the Desert Sessions, a side project of Homme with various guest collaborators. "You Think I Ain't Worth a Dollar, But I Feel Like a Millionaire" was the opening track of Volume 5: Poetry for the Masses (Sea Shed Shit Head by the She Sore), with vocals originally performed by Mario Lalli instead of Oliveri. "Hangin' Tree" first appeared on Volume 7: Gypsy Marches. "Song for the Deaf" and "Go with the Flow" were previously performed as early as 2001 with the former having very different lyrics and vocals completely by Mark Lanegan. The main riff for "No One Knows" comes from the Desert Sessions track "Cold Sore Superstars".

Grohl's drums were recorded in a small, "dead"-sounding isolation booth, to create a "tight, focused, punchy and kind of claustrophobic" sound. To allow for greater flexibility in positioning microphones, the cymbals were recorded separately. To achieve this, Grohl performed each song twice; for the initial pass without cymbals, he hit electronic cymbal pads, then repeated the performance with real cymbals but a dummy snare and padded toms, so only the cymbals made noise. The takes were then blended. The engineer Eric Valentine credited Grohl for his patience in the process, which he described as "very difficult". In October 2001, while the album was being recorded, Grohl said Songs for the Deaf was his favorite album that he had played drums on.

Homme said the use of fake radio segments gave the album "fluidity". Oliveri said they were a jibe at "how a lot of stations play the same thing over and over. We don't get played on the radio, so I figure we should talk shit about them."

== Artwork ==
The cover art for the US double LP version of the album is different from the CD version, featuring a red Q (with a sperm cell as the line in the Q and an egg cell as the circle) on a black background with no other text. It was released on red vinyl. The UK vinyl version cover is the same as the CD cover except with the colors reversed. The person on the album disc is musician Dave Catching, who performs on the album.

Both the CD and LP cover have a Parental Advisory seal on most copies, due to the word "fuck" appearing in the tracks "Song for the Dead", "Song for the Deaf" and "Six Shooter", as well as for the violent lyrics of the latter track.

There were also three different album covers that were made for the CD version of Songs for the Deaf. All of the interior artwork for each of the three versions is the same, but there were covers printed in red, magenta, and orange. The most common copy of the album sleeve is the red cover.

== Release and promotion ==
In September 2002, Homme explained the band's goals with the release of the album:

I've been thinking of this album since the first album, not necessarily the radio thing, but to me that isn't the full concept, the full concept is the diversity of it all, I think we're supposed to be pushing buttons over the three records. I've always looked at our first three records as a set: the first one was to distance ourselves from Kyuss, the second album fanned out the music into different areas and this one takes that out even a little further, I think.

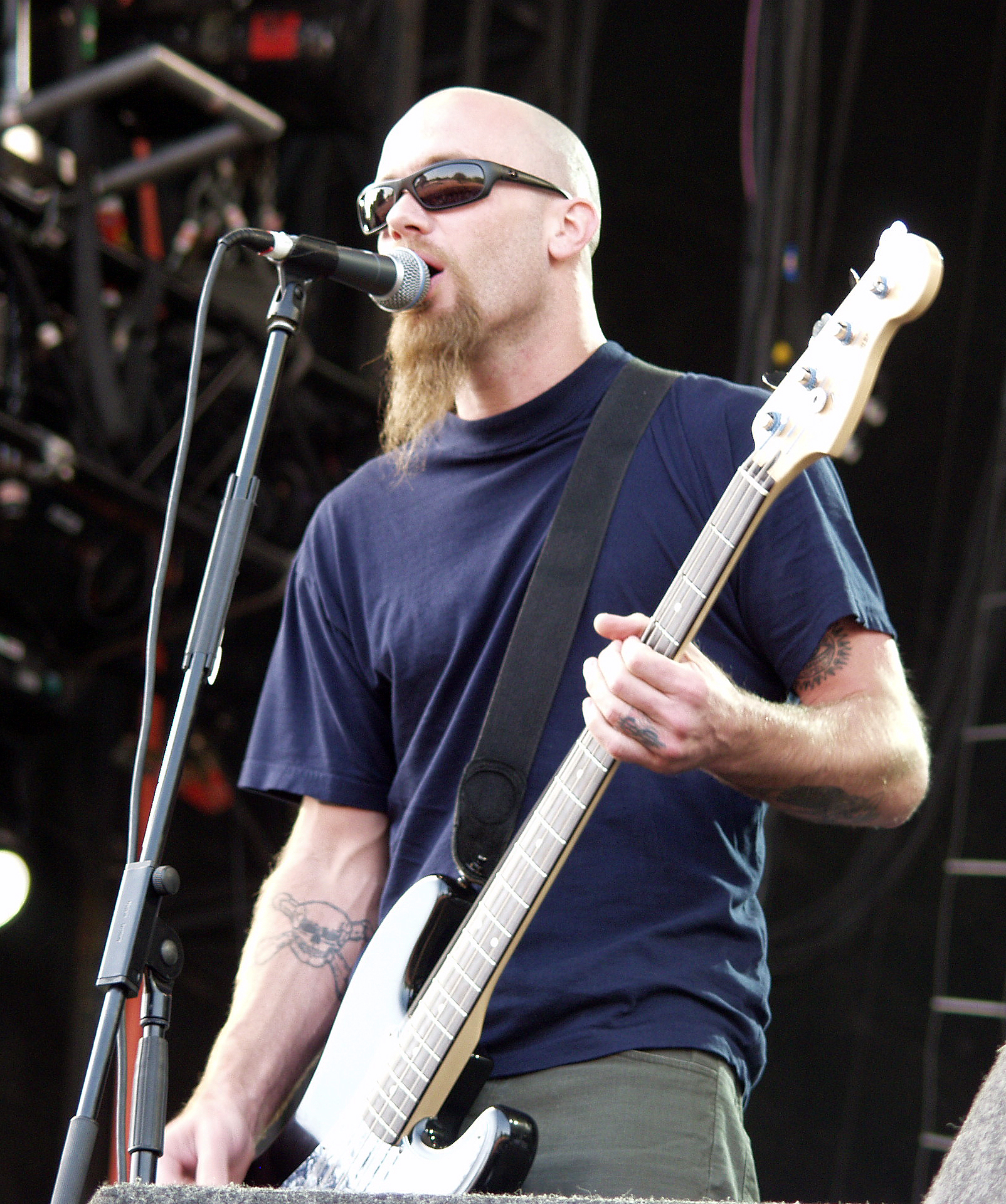
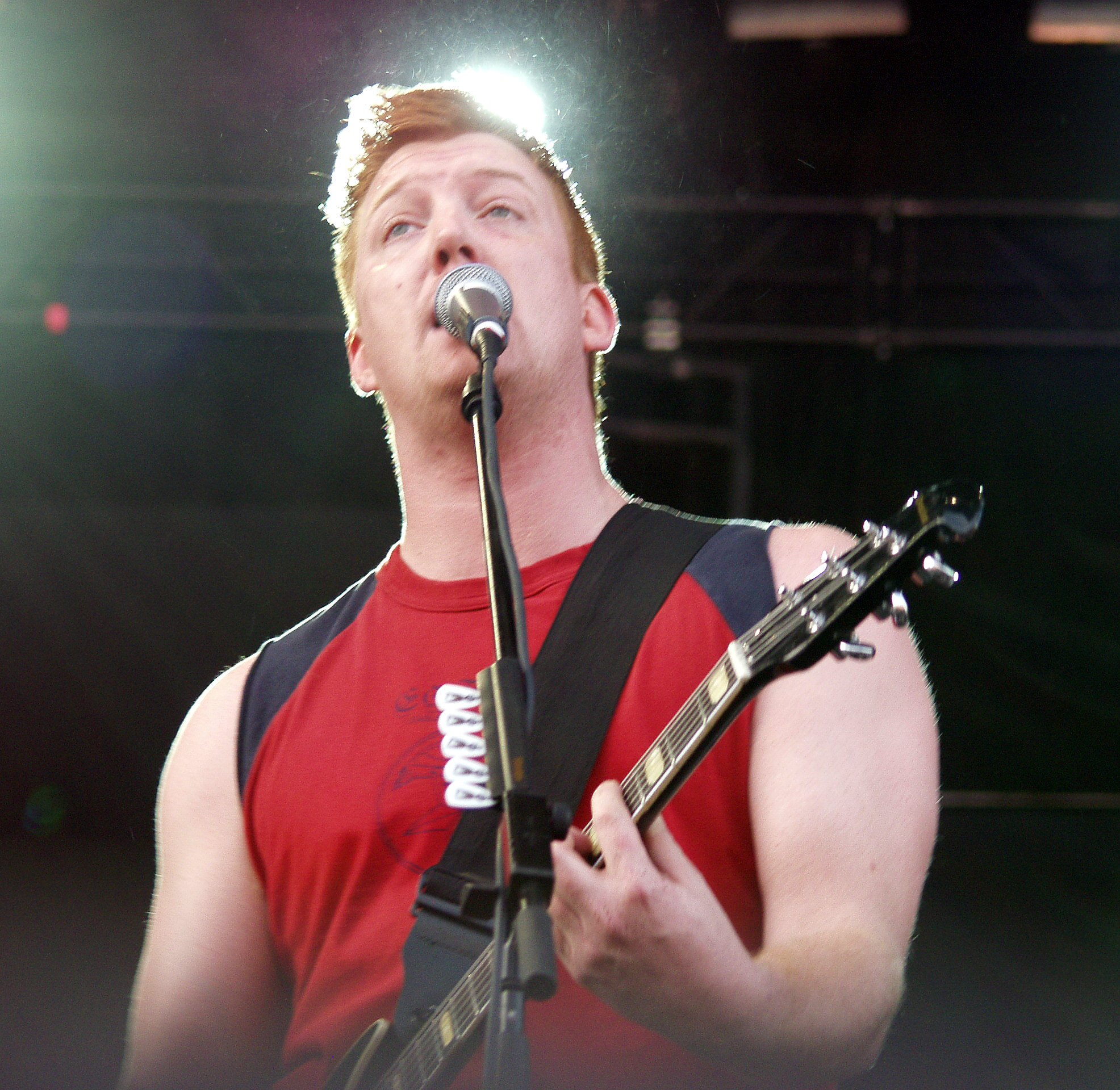
Nick Oliveri (above) and Josh Homme performing with the band at V2003 in support of the album

The album was planned for release on August 13, 2002, but was postponed for two weeks. Grohl put Foo Fighters on hiatus and delayed their upcoming album One by One to October 2002 to tour for Songs For the Deaf. His first performance with the band was at March 7, 2002 at the Troubadour, Los Angeles, and his last was at the Fuji Rock Festival on July 28. He returned to Foo Fighters, with Danzig drummer Joey Castillo announced as his replacement in August 2002.

== Reception ==
Professional ratings
Aggregate scores
Source	Rating
Metacritic	89/100
Review scores
Source	Rating
AllMusic	5/5 stars
Blender	4/5 stars
Entertainment Weekly	A
The Guardian	4/5 stars
Los Angeles Times	3/4 stars
NME	9/10
Pitchfork	7.9/10
Q	4/5 stars
Rolling Stone	3/5 stars
Uncut	5/5 stars

Songs for the Deaf was Queens of the Stone Age's breakout album and garnered the band international recognition. Upon its worldwide release in late August 2002, the album peaked at number 17 on the Billboard 200 album chart.

Songs for the Deaf received critical acclaim and is often cited as the band's greatest album to date. On Metacritic, which assigns a rating out of 100 from aggregated critic reviews, Songs for the Deaf is assigned a score of 89, indicating "universal acclaim", making the album the third highest-rated on the site from 2002. Josh Tyrangiel of Entertainment Weekly called it "the year's best hard-rock album", giving it an A. Splendid said "the bottom line is that QOTSA turns in another genre-demolishing, hard-as-titanium album in Songs for the Deaf. This is not your father's metal. It's better." Mojo listed the album as the year's third best. Kludge ranked it at number six on their list of best albums of 2002. NME placed the album as the sixth best, with the three singles each making the magazine's "Tracks of the Year" list over the course of 2002/2003. Kerrang! rated the album at number 1 on its "Best albums of 2002" list. Music critic Steven Hyden called the album the greatest hard-rock record of the 21st century.

The album earned the band's first gold certification in the US on January 27, 2003, shifting over 500,000 copies. It was certified platinum in the UK on September 20, 2002, with sales exceeding 100,000 copies, and platinum in Canada. As of June 2007 the total amount of sold copies in the US is estimated at 1,186,000, according to Nielsen Soundscan.

The album received two Best Hard Rock Performance Grammy nominations for singles "No One Knows" (2002), and "Go with the Flow" (2003).

To celebrate the twentieth anniversary of its "Hottest 100" poll, Australian radio station Triple J ran a "Hottest 100 of the last 20 years" poll in June 2013. Songs that were released between 1994 and 2013 were eligible for the poll and "No One Knows" was voted into eleventh position.

=== Accolades ===
Accolades for Songs for the Deaf
Publication	Country	Accolade	Year	Rank
Dagsavisen	Norway	The 21 Best Albums of the 21st Century	2005	16
VPRO	Netherlands	299 Nominations of the Best Album of All Time	2006	33
HARP	United States	50 Most Essential Albums since 2001	2006	48
NME	United Kingdom	The 100 Greatest Albums of the Decade	2009	15
Uncut	United Kingdom	Uncut's Albums of the Decade	2009	28
Pitchfork	United States	The Top 200 Albums of the 2000s	2009	134
Decibel Magazine	United States	The 100 Greatest Metal Albums of the Decade	2009	7
Rock Hard	Germany	The 500 Greatest Rock & Metal Albums of All Time	2005	380
Loudwire	United States	The Best Hard Rock Album of Each Year Since 1970	2024	1

== Track listing ==
All tracks are written by Josh Homme and Nick Oliveri, except where noted.

No.	Title	Writer(s)	Lead vocals	Length
0.	"The Real Song for the Deaf" (pregap track)	Homme	(instrumental)	1:32
1.	"You Think I Ain't Worth a Dollar, But I Feel Like a Millionaire"	Homme, Mario Lalli	Oliveri	3:12
2.	"No One Knows"	Homme, Mark Lanegan	Homme	4:38
3.	"First It Giveth"		Homme	3:18
4.	"A Song for the Dead"	Homme, Lanegan	Lanegan	5:52
5.	"The Sky Is Fallin'"		Homme	6:15
6.	"Six Shooter"		Oliveri	1:19
7.	"Hangin' Tree"	Homme, Alain Johannes	Lanegan	3:06
8.	"Go with the Flow"		Homme	3:07
9.	"Gonna Leave You"		Oliveri	2:50
10.	"Do It Again"		Homme	4:04
11.	"God Is in the Radio"		Lanegan	6:04
12.	"Another Love Song"		Oliveri	3:16
13.	"A Song for the Deaf" (Contains a hidden outtake version of "Feel Good Hit of the Summer" with all lyrics replaced with laughter.)	Homme, Oliveri, Lanegan	Homme, Lanegan	6:42
14.	"Mosquito Song" (hidden track)	Homme, Oliveri, Michael Melchiondo	Homme	5:37
Total length:				60:53

US vinyl bonus track
No.	Title	Length
15.	"Bloody Hammer" (Roky Erickson cover)	3:55

UK vinyl bonus tracks
No.	Title	Writer(s)	Length
15.	"The Lost Art of Keeping a Secret" (Live)		3:38
16.	"Everybody's Gonna Be Happy" (the Kinks cover)	Ray Davies	2:36

Japanese edition bonus tracks
No.	Title	Writer(s)	Length
15.	"The Lost Art of Keeping a Secret" (Live)		3:38
16.	"Everybody's Gonna Be Happy" (The Kinks cover)	Davies	2:36
17.	"Gonna Leave You" (Spanish Version)		2:55

International version bonus track
No.	Title	Writer(s)	Length
15.	"Everybody's Gonna Be Happy" (The Kinks cover)	Davies	2:36

== Personnel ==
Queens of the Stone Age

- Josh Homme – guitar, vocals
- Nick Oliveri – bass, vocals
- Dave Grohl – drums
- Mark Lanegan – vocals

Additional musicians

- Alain Johannes
- Natasha Shneider
- Gene Trautmann – drums (tracks 1 and 8)
- Dean Ween – guitar
- Brendon McNichol
- Chris Goss
- Ana Lenchantin – strings
- Paz Lenchantin – strings
- Molly McGuire
- John Gove
- Kevin Porter
- Brad Kintscher

Radio DJs

The songs on Songs for the Deaf are interluded by staged bits of radio chatter with guest DJs. In order of appearance:

- Blag Dahlia as DJ "Kip Kasper" of KLON - KLONE Radio of Los Angeles
- Alain Johannes as DJ "Héctor Bonifacio Echeverría Cervantes de la Cruz Arroyo Rojas" of Radio Quetzalcoatl
- Chris Goss as DJ "Elastic Ass" of KRDL - Kurdle 109 of Chino Hills
- C-Minus as DJ for KOOL
- Casey Chaos as station ad promoting "All Death Metal, all the time."
- Twiggy Ramirez as DJ "Tom Sherman" of Banning College Radio
- Lux Interior as DJ for AM580
- Jesse Hughes as Preacher
- Natasha Shneider as DJ for WOMB - The Womb
- Dave Catching as DJ for WANT of Wonder Valley

Technical personnel

- Josh Homme – production
- Eric Valentine – production (except "The Sky Is Fallin'" and "Do It Again"), recording
- Adam Kasper – production ("The Sky Is Fallin'" and "Do It Again"), additional recording ("No One Knows", "Go With The Flow", "Gonna Leave You", "Song For the Deaf"), mixing
- Nick Raskulinecz – mixing (radio broadcasts)
- Kevin Syzmanski – 2nd engineer
- Joe Marlett – 2nd engineer
- Brian Gardner – mastering (at Bernie Grundman Mastering, Hollywood, CA)
- Dan Druff – guitar technician
- Hutch – sound technician
- Bob Brunner "Mates" – pre-production

== Chart positions ==
=== Weekly charts ===
Weekly chart performance for Songs for the Deaf
Chart (2002)	Peak position
Australian Albums (ARIA)	7
Austrian Albums (Ö3 Austria)	19
Belgian Albums (Ultratop Flanders)	9
Belgian Albums (Ultratop Wallonia)	32
Canadian Albums (Nielsen Soundscan)	31
Danish Albums (Hitlisten)	33
Dutch Albums (Album Top 100)	17
European Top 100 Albums (Music & Media)	6
Finnish Albums (Suomen virallinen lista)	11
French Albums (SNEP)	32
German Albums (Offizielle Top 100)	9
Irish Albums (IRMA)	32
Italian Albums (FIMI)	23
New Zealand Albums (RMNZ)	13
Norwegian Albums (VG-lista)	2
Scottish Albums (Official Charts)	4
Swedish Albums (Sverigetopplistan)	18
Swiss Albums (Schweizer Hitparade)	20
UK Albums (Official Charts)	4
UK Rock & Metal Albums (Official Charts)	1
US Billboard 200	17

=== Year-end charts ===
2002 year-end chart performance for Songs for the Deaf
Chart (2002)	Position
Australian Albums (ARIA)	72
Belgian Albums (Ultratop Flanders)	43
Canadian Albums (Nielsen SoundScan)	135
Canadian Alternative Albums (Nielsen SoundScan)	43
Canadian Metal Albums (Nielsen SoundScan)	22
Dutch Albums (Album Top 100)	93
UK Albums (OCC)	92

2003 year-end chart performance for Songs for the Deaf
Chart (2003)	Position
UK Albums (OCC)	178
US Billboard 200	120

=== Singles ===
Year	Single	Chart	Peak	Ref.
2002	"No One Knows"	US Mainstream Rock Tracks	5	
2002	"No One Knows"	US Modern Rock Tracks	1	
2002	"No One Knows"	US Billboard Hot 100	51	
2002	"No One Knows"	Dutch Singles Chart	39	
2002	"No One Knows"	UK Singles Chart	15	
2003	"Go with the Flow"	US Mainstream Rock Tracks	24	
2003	"Go with the Flow"	US Modern Rock Tracks	7	
2003	"Go with the Flow"	US Billboard Hot 100	116	
2003	"Go with the Flow"	Australian Singles Chart	39	
2003	"Go with the Flow"	Irish Singles Chart	26	
2003	"Go with the Flow"	Dutch Singles Chart	50	
2003	"Go with the Flow"	UK Singles Chart	21	
2003	"First It Giveth"	UK Singles Chart	33	

== Certifications ==
Certifications and sales for Songs for the Deaf

Region	Certification	Certified units/sales
Australia (ARIA)	Platinum	70,000^{^}
Belgium (BRMA)	Platinum	50,000^{*}
Canada (Music Canada)	Platinum	100,000^{^}
Denmark (IFPI Danmark)	2× Platinum	40,000^{‡}
Germany (BVMI)	Gold	150,000^{‡}
Italy (FIMI) sales since 2009	Gold	25,000^{‡}
New Zealand (RMNZ)	Gold	7,500^{^}
Norway (IFPI Norway)	Platinum	40,000^{*}
Sweden (GLF)	Gold	30,000^{^}
United Kingdom (BPI)	2× Platinum	600,000^{‡}
United States (RIAA)	Gold	500,000^{^} / 1,186,000
Summaries
Europe (IFPI)	Platinum	1,000,000^{*}
^{*} Sales figures based on certification alone.^{^} Shipments figures based on certification alone.^{‡} Sales+streaming figures based on certification alone.
