= Deep in the Hole (album) =

Studio album by Masters of Reality
- Released: June 15, 2001
- Genre: Hard rock; stoner rock
- Length: 39:43
- Label: Brownhouse
- Producer: Chris Goss

Masters of Reality chronology
Welcome to the Western Lodge (1999)	Deep in the Hole (2001)	Flak 'n' Flight (2003)

Professional ratings
Review scores
Source	Rating
AllMusic	4/5 stars
Rock Sound	4/5 stars

Deep in the Hole is the fourth studio album of the American rock band Masters of Reality, released on June 15, 2001.

This album contains guest appearances by Dave Catching, Josh Homme, Mark Lanegan, Troy Van Leeuwen, Nick Lucero, Brendon McNichol, Nick Oliveri, and Roxy Saint.

== Track listing ==
All tracks are written by Chris Goss, except where noted.

No.	Title	Writer(s)	Length
1.	"Third Man on the Moon"		5:12
2.	"A Wish for a Fish"		3:56
3.	"Counting Horses"		5:34
4.	"Major Lance"		1:02
5.	"Scatagoria"		4:09
6.	"High Noon Amsterdam"	Goss, Leamy	3:45
7.	"Corpus Scorpios Electrified"	Goss, Leamy	3:53
8.	"Deep in the Hole"	Goss, Leamy	4:32
9.	"Roof of the Shed"	Goss, Josh Homme	4:30
10.	"Shotgun Son"		3:10
Total length:			39:43
