= Rated R (Queens of the Stone Age album) =

2000 studio album by Queens of the Stone Age

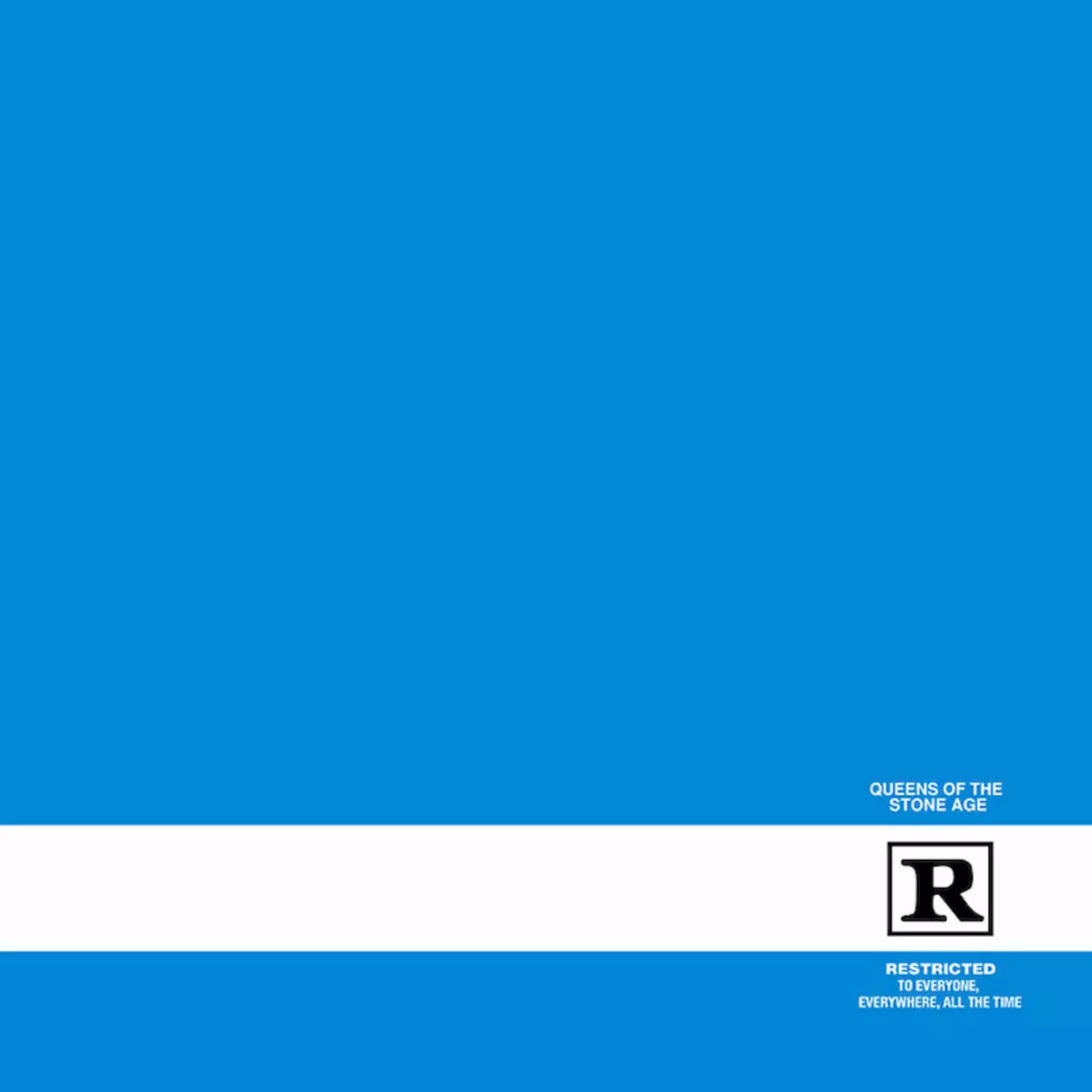

Studio album by Queens of the Stone Age
- Released: June 6, 2000
- Recorded: December 1999 – February 2000
- Studio: Sound City (Van Nuys)
- Genres: Stoner rock; alternative rock; hard rock; alternative metal
- Length: 42:10
- Label: Interscope
- Producers: Chris Goss; Joshua Homme

Queens of the Stone Age chronology
Queens of the Stone Age (1998)	Rated R (2000)	Songs for the Deaf (2002)

Alternative cover
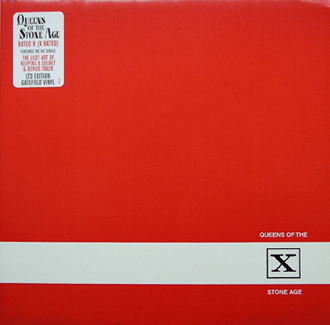
- Cover of the LP release

Alternative cover
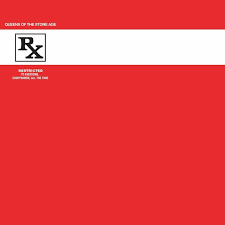
- Cover of the 2010 Deluxe Edition

Singles from Rated R
- 1. "The Lost Art of Keeping a Secret" Released: August 7, 2000; 2. "Feel Good Hit of the Summer" Released: November 27, 2000

Rated R (also known on vinyl as Rated X and Rated RX on the 2010 deluxe edition) is the second studio album by American rock band Queens of the Stone Age. It was released on June 6, 2000, by Interscope Records. Rated R was the band's first album for the label, as well as their first to feature bassist Nick Oliveri and vocalist Mark Lanegan.

The album was a critical and commercial success and became the band's breakthrough album, peaking at number 54 in the UK and eventually being certified gold by the BPI. Two singles were released from Rated R: "The Lost Art of Keeping a Secret" and "Feel Good Hit of the Summer", with the former helping the band reach mainstream popularity.

== Composition ==
"Feel Good Hit of the Summer"
The album's first track, featuring minimalist lyrics focusing on drugs.

Rated R has been described as featuring stoner rock, alternative rock, hard rock, and alternative metal. The album contains numerous references to drugs and alcohol. This is particularly prominent on the opening track, "Feel Good Hit of the Summer", which consists entirely of the repeated verse "Nicotine, valium, vicodin, marijuana, ecstasy and alcohol" followed by a chorus of "c-c-c-c-c-cocaine". Though frontman Josh Homme has emphasized the fact there is no definitive endorsement or condemnation behind the lyrics, he has confirmed he came up with the lyrics stumbling through the desert at night after a New Year's party, trying to remember what exactly he had consumed that evening leaving him so intoxicated.

Following the theme, "Monsters in the Parasol", which originally appeared on the Desert Sessions album, Volume 4: Hard Walls and Little Trips, is about Homme's first experience on LSD, kicking in just as his friends' father and sister came home, leading to a bad trip. The song "Better Living Through Chemistry" offers an opposing stance on prescription drugs, while Homme's favorite song from the album, closer "I Think I Lost My Headache", is described as being about "Paranoia... when you think something strange is going on, and everyone around you is so adamant about telling you it's fine... but then you start thinking 'Wouldn't that be exactly what you'd say if you didn't want me to know, and there is something going on?' And so it's kind of about that paranoid mentality which maybe I have sometimes." The song is also notable for its unconventional intro and outro in the 15/8 time signature, with the outro culminating in several minutes of an incessantly jarring and repetitive horn part, added to punish those who may have fallen asleep listening to the album.

Rated R features the debut of bassist Nick Oliveri and guest vocalist Mark Lanegan, who both made vocal and songwriting contributions to the band. In addition to providing backing vocals for "Auto Pilot" and "I Think I Lost My Headache", Lanegan sang lead vocals on "In the Fade", a song about clarity following a comedown/sobriety, while Oliveri sang "Tension Head", a re-recording of the song "13th Floor" off Oliveri's Mondo Generator's debut album Cocaine Rodeo, and "Quick and to the Pointless", which follows the singer's experiences on heroin and speed, and cocaine and meth, respectively. "Quick and to the Pointless'" drum, bass, guitar and vocal tracks were recorded simultaneously in just one take. Oliveri's vocal performance was originally intended to be a scratch vocal, but the band liked it so much that this original recording remained on the finished song including the two verses in Dutch.

One of the few songs not involving drug use is the albums' lead single, "The Lost Art of Keeping a Secret", which is a response by Homme to people who had lost his trust, particularly involving trysts. Another one, the acoustic instrumental "Lightning Song" was penned by touring keyboardist, second guitarist, and lap steel player Dave Catching.

== Packaging ==
The 1970s-era MPAA "R" rating bumper features on the album's cover, along with the text "RESTRICTED TO EVERYONE, EVERYWHERE, ALL THE TIME". The album's liner notes contain further warning messages for each song, in the style of the warning messages given to parents on video and DVD boxes: "Auto Pilot", for example, contains "Alcohol and Sleep Deprivation". The title and subtext was meant by the band as a jab at record label Interscope for their insistence that the album's themes were too controversial and would warrant a parental advisory sticker. The warnings in the album artwork circumvented the issue and the label allowed the band to sell the album without a sticker.

== Release ==
Rated R was released by Interscope Records on June 6, 2000. A UK-only special edition of the album included a bonus disc, titled Rated U, which was also separately issued as the "Feel Good Hit of the Summer" single. Along with "Feel Good Hit of the Summer" and its video, it featured three newly recorded songs.

=== 2010 reissue ===
In an May 2010 interview with NME, Josh Homme announced plans to reissue Rated R which would feature B-side recordings and live performances from Reading Festival. It was released on August 3, 2010.

Added to the original album is a second disc with six B-sides and the band's summer 2000 Reading Festival concert—featuring nine previously unreleased songs, including live versions of Rated R's "Feel Good Hit of the Summer", "The Lost Art of Keeping a Secret", "Better Living Through Chemistry" and "Quick and to the Pointless".

The B-sides are "Ode to Clarissa", "You're So Vague", covers of Romeo Void's "Never Say Never" and The Kinks' "Who'll Be the Next in Line", a live version of the album's "Monsters in the Parasol", a song originally from Josh Homme's side project, The Desert Sessions, and a re-recording of "Born to Hula", an early song from Kyuss/Queens of the Stone Age EP. The other Reading Festival tracks are concert takes on "Ode to Clarissa", three songs from the band's debut album ("Regular John", "Avon" and "You Can't Quit Me, Baby"), and "You Think I Ain't Worth a Dollar, But I Feel Like a Millionaire", another track originally by The Desert Sessions, which was also present on their third album, Songs for the Deaf.

== Critical reception ==
Professional ratings
Review scores
Source	Rating
AllMusic	5/5 stars
Entertainment Weekly	C+
The Guardian	4/5 stars
Mojo	5/5 stars
NME	9/10
Pitchfork	8.6/10
Q	4/5 stars
Rolling Stone	3.5/5 stars
Spin	4/5 stars
Uncut	4/5 stars

Rated R was critically acclaimed. Steve Huey from AllMusic said "R is mellower, trippier, and more arranged than its predecessor, making its point through warm fuzz-guitar tones, ethereal harmonies, vibraphones, horns, and even the odd steel drum. That might alienate listeners who have come to expect a crunchier guitar attack, but even though it's not really aggro, R is still far heavier than the garage punk and grunge that inform much of the record. It's still got the vaunted Arizona-desert vibes of Kyuss, but it evokes a more relaxed, spacious, twilight feel, as opposed to a high-noon meltdown. Mark Lanegan and Barrett Martin of the Screaming Trees both appear on multiple tracks, and their band's psychedelic grunge – in its warmer, less noisy moments – is actually not a bad point of comparison."

Rhapsody called it the best rock album of the decade on its "Rock's Best Albums of the Decade" list.

Rolling Stone named it the 82nd best album of the decade.

== Track listing ==
All tracks are written by Josh Homme and Nick Oliveri, except where noted. Lead vocals by Homme, except where noted.

No.	Title	Writer(s)	Lead vocals	Length
1.	"Feel Good Hit of the Summer"			2:43
2.	"The Lost Art of Keeping a Secret"			3:36
3.	"Leg of Lamb"			2:48
4.	"Auto Pilot"		Oliveri	4:01
5.	"Better Living Through Chemistry"			5:49
6.	"Monsters in the Parasol"	Homme, Mario Lalli		3:27
7.	"Quick and to the Pointless"		Oliveri	1:42
8.	"In the Fade" (Includes a reprise of "Feel Good Hit of the Summer")	Homme, Mark Lanegan	Lanegan	4:25
9.	"Tension Head"		Oliveri	2:52
10.	"Lightning Song"	Dave Catching	(Instrumental)	2:07
11.	"I Think I Lost My Headache"			8:40
Total length:				42:10

Japanese version/Rated X/limited LP version bonus track
No.	Title	Lead vocals	Length
12.	"Ode to Clarissa"	Oliveri	2:40

UK special edition (disc two) Rated U
No.	Title	Writer(s)	Lead vocals	Length
1.	"Feel Good Hit of the Summer"			2:43
2.	"Never Say Never" (Romeo Void cover)	Benjamin Bossi, Debora Iyall, Frank Zincavage, Larry Carter, Pete Woods		4:22
3.	"You're So Vague"			3:40
4.	"Who'll Be the Next in Line" (The Kinks cover)	Ray Davies	Oliveri	2:29
5.	"Feel Good Hit of the Summer" (CD-ROM video)			2:43
Total length:				15:57

Deluxe edition (disc two)
No.	Title	Writer(s)	Lead vocals	Length
1.	"Ode to Clarissa" (B-side of "The Lost Art of Keeping a Secret")		Oliveri	2:40
2.	"You're So Vague" (B-side of "Feel Good Hit of the Summer")			3:40
3.	"Never Say Never" (B-side of "Feel Good Hit of the Summer"; Romeo Void cover)	Benjamin Bossi, Debora Iyall, Frank Zincavage, Larry Carter, Pete Woods		4:22
4.	"Who'll Be the Next in Line" (B-side of "Feel Good Hit of the Summer"; The Kinks cover)	Davies	Oliveri	2:29
5.	"Born to Hula" (B-side of "The Lost Art of Keeping a Secret"; re-recorded 2000 version)	Homme		5:53
6.	"Monsters in the Parasol" (B-side of "The Lost Art of Keeping a Secret"; live in Seattle)			3:32
7.	"Feel Good Hit of the Summer" (live at the Reading Festival 2000)			2:59
8.	"Regular John" (live at the Reading Festival 2000)	Homme, Alfredo Hernández, John McBain		5:12
9.	"Avon" (live at the Reading Festival 2000)	Homme		3:23
10.	"Quick and to the Pointless" (live at the Reading Festival 2000)		Oliveri	2:34
11.	"Better Living Through Chemistry" (live at the Reading Festival 2000)			5:19
12.	"Ode to Clarissa" (live at the Reading Festival 2000)		Oliveri	2:52
13.	"The Lost Art of Keeping a Secret" (live at the Reading Festival 2000)			3:33
14.	"You Can't Quit Me, Baby" (live at the Reading Festival 2000)	Homme, Hernández		10:37
15.	"Millionaire" (live at the Reading Festival 2000)	Homme, Lalli	Oliveri	4:37

=== Notes ===
- Most European editions separate "In the Fade" and the "Feel Good Hit of the Summer" reprise into two tracks, 3:51 and 0:34 in length. The track listing on the back cover remains the same as on the regular edition, which means that it does not match the actual track numbers from that point on.
- In the liner notes, it states "'Better Living Through Chemistry' chorus inspired by Björk"; it borrows lyrics from the chorus on "Crying" on her Debut album.
- On the deluxe edition, the live version of the Songs for the Deaf track "You Think I Ain't Worth a Dollar, But I Feel Like a Millionaire" is shortened to simply "Millionaire".

== Personnel ==
Performers

- Josh Homme – lead vocals (tracks 1–3, 5, 6, 11); guitars (tracks 1–3, 5, 6, 8, 9, 11), percussion (tracks 3, 8), lead guitar (tracks 4, 7), backing vocals (tracks 4, 8), drums (track 4), piano (track 10); producer, mixing, concept
- Nick Oliveri – bass guitar (all except 4), backing vocals (1, 2, 5, 6, 11), lead vocals (4, 7, 9), guitar (track 4), percussion (track 8); concept, art conception
- Gene Trautmann – drums (tracks 1, 6, 7, 9)
- Dave Catching – electric piano (tracks 1, 2, 8), lap steel guitar (tracks 1, 11), guitar (tracks 6, 7), B3 (track 4), piano (track 5), 12-string guitar (track 10)
- Nick Lucero – drums (tracks 2, 3, 5, 8, 11), percussion (tracks 3, 4)
- Chris Goss – backing vocals (tracks 4–6), grand piano, percussion (track 1), "noise" piano (track 2), bass guitar (track 4); producer
- Mark Lanegan – backing vocals (tracks 4, 11), lead vocals (track 8)
- Barrett Martin – vibes (tracks 2, 5), percussion (tracks 5, 10), steel drum (track 11)
- Mike Johnson – backing vocals (track 3)
- Pete Stahl – backing vocals (track 2)
- Rob Halford – backing vocals (track 1)
- Nick Eldorado – backing vocals (tracks 1, 7)
- Wendy Rae Fowler (Wendy Ray Moan) – backing vocals (tracks 1, 7)
- Scott Mayo – baritone sax (track 2), horns (track 11)
- Fernando Pullum – flugelhorn (track 7), horns (track 11)
- Reggie Young – horns (track 11)

Technical personnel

- Trina Shoemaker – engineer, mixing
- Marek – noise (track 8), second engineer, mixing
- Bradley Cook – additional recording (tracks 8, 9)
- Martin Schmelzle – sequence & assembly engineer
- Dan Druff – guitar technician
- Robert Brunner – pre-production assistant
- Francesca Restrepo – art direction

== Commercial performance ==
Rated R was the band's breakout album in the UK. It peaked at number 54 there and was certified silver by the British Phonographic Industry in 2001 and later certified gold in 2013. In the U.S., however, the album did not chart on the Billboard 200, instead peaking at number 16 on the Top Heatseekers album chart.

Rated R included the hit single "The Lost Art of Keeping a Secret", which was released in the summer of 2000 and became arguably the band's most recognizable and popular song at its time of release. Not only did its music video receive mild airplay on music television, the song was featured in the Entourage episode "I Love You Too" (from Season 2). It was also the only single from the album to get a chart position, reaching number 21 on the Mainstream Rock chart, number 36 on the Modern Rock chart and number 31 on the UK Singles Chart.

== Charts ==
=== Original 2000 release ===
Chart (2000–2002)	Peak position
Australian Albums (ARIA)	63
German Albums (Offizielle Top 100)	72
Norwegian Albums (VG-lista)	35
Scottish Albums (Official Charts)	55
UK Albums (OCC)	54
US Heatseekers Albums (Billboard)	16

=== 2010 re-release ===
Chart (2010)	Peak position
Australian Albums (ARIA)	99
French Albums (SNEP)	143
Irish Albums (IRMA)	89
US Indie Store Album Sales (Billboard)	22

=== Singles ===
Year	Single	Chart	Peak	Ref.
2000	"The Lost Art of Keeping a Secret"	US Mainstream Rock	21	
2000	"The Lost Art of Keeping a Secret"	US Modern Rock	36	
2000	"The Lost Art of Keeping a Secret"	Australian Singles (ARIA)	75	
2000	"The Lost Art of Keeping a Secret"	UK Singles Chart	31	
2000	"Feel Good Hit of the Summer"	Australian Singles (ARIA)	75	

== Certifications ==
Region	Certification	Certified units/sales
Australia (ARIA)	Gold	35,000^{^}
United Kingdom (BPI)	Gold	100,000^{*}
^{*} Sales figures based on certification alone.^{^} Shipments figures based on certification alone.
