= Chris Goss =

American record producer and musician (born 1958)

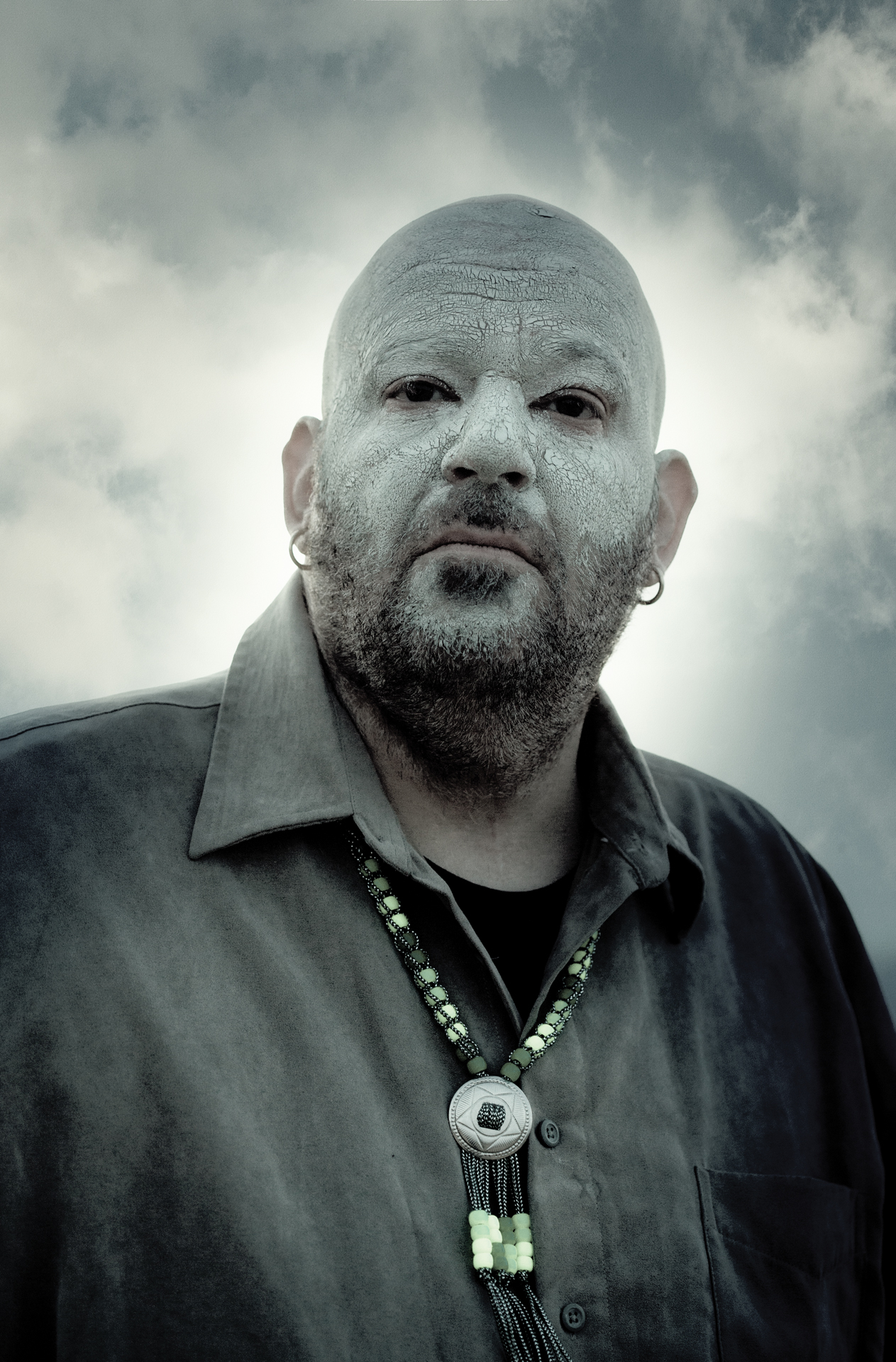
- Goss in 2010

Background information
- Born: Syracuse, New York
- Genres: Rock; desert rock; stoner rock; hard rock
- Occupations: Musician; singer; songwriter; producer; recording engineer
- Instruments: Vocals; guitar; keyboards
- Years active: 1980s–present

Chris Goss is an American record producer and musician. Best known for producing records for Kyuss and Queens of the Stone Age, he is regarded as an important figure in the development of stoner rock and desert rock genres. Goss is also the lead singer and guitarist of the hard rock band Masters of Reality.

== Recording career ==
As well as being the founding (and only constant) member of influential desert rock outfit Masters of Reality, Goss is also well known for his production work on albums by Kyuss and Queens of the Stone Age. Largely credited as the Godfather of desert rock, Goss has on several occasions played down the importance of his role in this musical movement. In 1999, he stated, "I can't make any claim at all to inventing desert rock, or stoner rock, or whatever you want to call it. I make rock n roll records, and hopefully try to make the listener feel like I did when I heard my favourite music."

In 2004, Goss highlighted exactly what kind of music he created, "There's a bunch of weirdos that I work with all the time, and we make what I call 'out of whack' Rock records. That's what I do. When people want an 'out of whack' weird Rock record, they call me, and I take an 'out of whack' amount of money to do it, and I'm glad to be there. It's cool."

In late 2004, Goss had to be hospitalized due to severe internal infection and the European leg of his tour in support of the new Masters of Reality album Give Us Barabbas had to be postponed indefinitely. After his recuperation, he joined Jeordie White and Zach Hill to release I Got a Brand New Egg Layin' Machine, a "mini LP" released under the name Goon Moon.

Goss appeared with his longtime friend Josh Homme of Queens of the Stone Age as "The 5:15ers" at the "winter edition" of ArthurFest, performing an intimate set which was "crafted in less than a month as the duo was a rather late addition to the Arthurball line-up as Sunday's headliner". Continuing with Goon Moon, Goss, White and Hill released a full-length album in May 2007 entitled Licker's Last Leg containing many guest artists synonymous with the desert rock scene.

Goss also joined Queens of the Stone Age and Billy Gibbons to perform "Burn the Witch" on Late Night with Conan O'Brien.

In 2013, regarding Josh Homme's supposed decision to sequence the album Era Vulgaris using songs originated in a "Los Angeles studio without a single thing written, just to see what it was like to force songs out of his psyche", Goss was quoted saying: "I've seen him do that before with the Desert Sessions but never with Queens. The Queens of the Stone Age is a business, where he's the CEO. It's not run the same."

In 2014, filming was completed in Las Vegas for Death in the Desert, a full-length movie for which Goss wrote an original song titled "Only the Lonely", performed by singer Roxy Saint, who plays the character Corey in the full-length film, which is directed and produced by Saint's husband, Josh Evans. It stars Michael Madsen, Shayla Beesley and Paz de la Huerta. The movie is inspired by the book Death in the Desert by Cathy Scott, with the screenplay by John Steppling.

In 2024 Goss and Alain Johannes contributed the Jethro Tull song "Aqualung" from the 1971 album Aqualung to the tribute album Aqualung (Redux) released through Magnetic Eye Records. It was performed in a cappella style using voices for the instrumentation along with various electronic percussion noises.

== Selected discography ==
Throughout his career, Goss has worked with a wide range of musicians in various genres.

- 1989: Masters of Reality by Masters of Reality
- 1992: Blues for the Red Sun by Kyuss
- 1993: Sunrise on the Sufferbus by Masters of Reality
- 1994: Welcome to Sky Valley by Kyuss
- 1994: All of Us by I Love You
- 1995: ...And the Circus Leaves Town by Kyuss
- 1995: Marie Mozege by Les Super Stars
- 1996: Dust by Screaming Trees
- 1996: Leave the Story Untold by Soulwax
- 1996: Daaly by Thione Seck
- 1996: Tiny Music... Songs from the Vatican Gift Shop by Stone Temple Pilots
- 1996: Amusing the Amazing by Slo Burn
- 1997: How High the Moon: Live at the Viper Room by Masters of Reality
- 1998: Holiday Man by The Flys
- 1998: Gaslight by 30 Odd Foot of Grunts
- 1998: Volumes 3 & 4 by Desert Sessions
- 1998: Queens of the Stone Age by Queens of the Stone Age
- 1999: Kimi No Oto Ga Kikoeru Basho by Bird
- 1999: Welcome to the Western Lodge by Masters of Reality
- 2000: Spirit\Light\Speed by Ian Astbury
- 2000: Cocaine Rodeo by Mondo Generator
- 2000: Rated R by Queens of the Stone Age
- 2000: Muchas Gracias: The Best of Kyuss by Kyuss
- 2000: Outta My Way by The Flys
- 2001: Toasted by Fatso Jetson
- 2001: Volumes 7 & 8 by The Desert Sessions
- 2001: Deep in the Hole by Masters of Reality
- 2002: Songs for the Deaf by Queens of the Stone Age
- 2003: Flak 'n' Flight by Masters of Reality
- 2003: Tell Them Hi by Campfire Girls
- 2003: Vol. 9&10 by The Desert Sessions
- 2003: Atomic Ritual by Nebula
- 2003: Here Comes That Weird Chill by Mark Lanegan Band
- 2003: The Underground Personality Tapes by Roxy Saint
- 2004: Never, Never Land by UNKLE
- 2004: Give Us Barabbas by Masters of Reality
- 2004: Bubblegum by the Mark Lanegan Band
- 2004: Auf der Maur by Melissa Auf der Maur
- 2004: Demon Crossing by Yellow #5
- 2004: Mister Mental by The Eighties Matchbox B-Line Disaster
- 2005: I Got a Brand New Egg Layin' Machine by Goon Moon
- 2005: Lullabies to Paralyze by Queens of the Stone Age
- 2005: Ocean of Confusion: Songs of Screaming Trees 1989–1996 by Screaming Trees
- 2007: Licker's Last Leg by Goon Moon
- 2007: The Cool by Lupe Fiasco
- 2007: Era Vulgaris by Queens of the Stone Age
- 2007: War Stories by UNKLE
- 2008: It's OK to be Happy by Smith & Pyle
- 2008: Neptune by The Duke Spirit
- 2008: More Stories by UNKLE
- 2008: End Titles... Stories for Film by UNKLE
- 2009: Pine/Cross Dover by Masters of Reality
- 2010: Out of Our Minds by Melissa Auf der Maur
- 2010: Where Did the Night Fall by UNKLE
- 2010: Everyman and Woman Is a Star by The Cult
- 2011: Enjoy Your Psychosis by Drums Are for Parades
- 2013: Sound City: Real to Reel by Sound City Players
- 2013: Sons of Anarchy: Songs of Anarchy Vol. 3 by Various artists
- 2014: Sonic Highways by Foo Fighters
- 2016: Your Desert My Mind by The Mutants
- 2017: The Road: Part 1 by UNKLE
- 2019: The Road: Part II (Lost Highway) by UNKLE
- 2020: Lavender Blues by Big Scenic Nowhere
- 2024: Aqualung (Redux) by Various artists
- 2025: The Archer by Masters of Reality

== See also ==
- Goon Moon
- Masters of Reality
- Palm Desert Scene
- The Desert Sessions
