= Man's Ruin Records discography =

The discography of Man's Ruin Records, a defunct independent record label, founded by Frank Kozik.

== Discography ==
Artist	Title	Format	Catalog Number
E.A.R.	Delta 6	10"	MR-001
The Useless Playboys	Bim Bam	7" pic disc	MR-002
The Tards	Rubber Room	7"	MR-003
Dale Crover	Drumb	7"	MR-004
The Dwarves	Gentlemen Prefer Blondes but Blondes Don't Like Cripples	7" pic disc	MR-005
Blag Dahlia	Haunt Me	7"	MR-006
Killdozer / Ritual Device	We Will Crush You split	10"	MR-007
Frank Kozik	Man's Ruin: The Posters and Art of Frank Kozik	Book	MR-008
Useless Playboys	Drunk Elephant	T-shirt	MR-009
Pervis	Simple	7"	MR-010
Steel Pole Bath Tub	Auf Wiedersehen	7"	MR-011
The Outsideinside	9:33	7"	MR-012
Mono Men	Monster	7"	MR-013
Melvins	Interstellar Overdrive	10"	MR-014
Kyuss	Into the Void	10"	MR-015
Brutal Juice	All American City	7"	MR-016
Protein	My Blood	7"	MR-017
Roadsaw	American Dream	7"	MR-018
Tree	Home Front	7"	MR-019
Aunt Worm	Saucy Young Lady	7"	MR-020
X-Cops	Beat You Down	7"	MR-021
The Hellacopters	Supershitty to the Max!	LP/CD	MR-022
The Nomads	Iron Dream	7"	MR-023
Unsane	Sick	7"	MR-024
Barkmarket	Peacekeeper	12"	MR-025
7 Year Bitch	Miss Understood	7"	MR-026
Daddy Longhead	Daddy Longhead	10"	MR-027
The Cowslingers	Trucker's Last Dollar	7"	MR-028
Hammerlock	American Asshole	CD	MR-029
The Onyas	Live for Rejection	7"	MR-030
Flux	Plains at Ground Zero	7"	MR-031
Cosmic Psychos	She's a Lost Cause	7"	MR-032
The Clarke Nova	Highway Star	7"	MR-033
Helios Creed	Abducted	7"	MR-034
Chrome	Chrome	10"	MR-035
Gamma Ray	If Only Everything	7"	MR-036
Action Suits	Cancer Father	7"	MR-037
Tree	God Grows Grass	7"	MR-038
Daddy Longhead	Classic	CD	MR-039
Trailer Hitch	Long Tall Tales...	CD	MR-040
The Heads	Delwyn's Conkers	10"	MR-041
The Demonics	R.I.P. S.T.P.	7"	MR-042
Ton-Ups	Kill Me Slow	7"	MR-043
Hammerlock	Knock Her Out	7"	MR-044
Infested	Who They Are	7"	MR-045
Six Minute War Madness	L'Ora Guista	7"	MR-046
Drooler	King of the Coal	7"	MR-047
Fu Manchu	Godzilla	10"	MR-048
Barkmarket	L.RON	LP	MR-049
Earthlings?	Earthlings		MR-050
The Dwarves/Blag Dahlia	We Must Have Blood/Surfing the Intercourse Barn	7"	MR-051
Ultraviolet Booze Catastrophe	Electric Honkey	10"	MR-052
Sex Pistols/The Ugly	Pretty Vacant/Disorder/You Bug Me	7"	MR-053
Polar Bear	Polar Bear	LP	MR-054
Viletones	Screamin' Fist	7"	MR-055
Sex Pistols/Sofisticatos	"No Feelings"/"New York Rocket"	7"	MR-056
Magic Dirt	I Was Cruel	10"	MR-057
Croatan	Terror in My Pants	7"	MR-058
Shyster	February	CD	MR-059
Croatan	Violent Passion Surrogate	CD	MR-060
Chrome	Tidal Forces	CD	MR-061
Schweinhund	Bastard	7"	MR-062
Kyuss/QOTSA	split	CD	MR-063
Zeke	PIG	7"	MR-064
Killdozer	The Last Waltz	CD	MR-065
Adam Parfrey	An Sordid Evening of Sonic Sorrows	CD	MS-066
Los Cowslingers	Mexican Blackbird	7"	MR-067
Mover	Original Recipe	LP/CD	MR-068
Unsane	Amrep Xmas	CD	MR-069
Fireballs	Holiday	7"	MR-070
Electric Wizard/Orange Goblin	Chrono.Naut/Nuclear Guru	CD	MR-071
Altamont	Wanted Dead or Alive	10"	MR-072
Acid King	Down with the Crown	10"	MR-073
Speedbuggy	George Owens	10"	MR-074
Mens Club	Woman Driver	10"	MR-075
Solarized	Neanderthal Speedway	CD	MR-076
Honky	Deezy	10"	MR-077
The Heads	Mao Tinitus	10"	MR-078
FuckEmos	Celebration	10"	MR-079
FuckEmos	Celebration	CD	MR-080
The Desert Sessions	#1 Instrumental Driving Music For Felons	10"	MR-081
The Desert Sessions	#2 Status: Ships Commander Butchered	10"	MR-082
Electric Wizard	Chrono.Naut	10"	MR-083
Orange Goblin	Nuclear Guru	10"	MR-084
Altamont	Civil War Fantasy	CD	MR-085
Hot Rod Honeys	name and release status unknown		MR-086
-	MR-087 was planned as Los Gusanos 7", which was never released		
Acid King/Altamont	Down with the Crown/Wanted Dead or Alive split	CD	MR-088
Flaming Burnout	Estrus Benefit Compilation	CD	MR-089
Sex Pistols/The Curse	split	7"	MR-090
Drunk Horse	Drunk Horse	CD	MR-091
Helios Creed	Activated Condition	CD	MR-092
The Desert Sessions	#1 & #2	CD	MR-093
Hai Karate	Hai Karate	10"	MR-094
Hai Karate	Hai Karate	CD	MR-095
Fang	Electric Chair	7"	MR-096
The Heads	The Time Is Now	CD	MR-097
Various Artists	500 Miles to Glory Compilation	CD	MR-098
Entombed	Entombed	10"	MR-099
MISSING			MR-100
Los Natas	Delmar	CD	MR-101
Alabama Thunderpussy	Rise Again	CD	MR-102
Greenmachine	D.A.M.N.	CD	MR-103
Acid King	Busse Woods	CD	MR-104
The Idiots/Jack Saints	Idiots/Jack Saints split	CD	MR-105
Gluecifer	Gary O'Kane	10"	MR-106
Electric Frankenstein	Listen Up, Baby	10"	MR-107
Electric Frankenstein / The Hookers	Electric Frankenstein/The Hookers split	CD	MR-108
The Hookers	The Hookers	10"	MR-109
Cheap Dates	Cheap Dates	10"	MR-110
The Desert Sessions	#3 Set Coordinates For The White Dwarf	10"	MR-111
The Desert Sessions	#4 Hard Walls And Little Trips	10"	MR-112
The Desert Sessions	#3 & #4	CD	MR-113
Candy Snatchers	This Is Rock-N-Roll? (test pressing only)	10"	MR-114
Candy Snatchers/Cheap Dates	split	CD	MR-115
Hangnail	One Million Layers B.C.	10"/CD	MR-116
Gluecifer/The Hellacopters	Respect the Rock America split	CD	MR-117
MISSING			MR-118
Entombed	Black Juju	CD	MR-119
Ton Ups	Tune Down	CD	MR-120
The Desert Sessions	#5 Poetry for the Masses (Sea Shed Shit Head by the She Sore)	10"	MR-121
The Desert Sessions	#6 Poetry for the Masses (Black Anvil Ego)	10"	MR-122
The Desert Sessions	#5 & #6	CD	MR-123
Valis/Kitty Kitty	Valis/Kitty Kitty split	CD	MR-124
Angel Rot	Unlistenable Hymns of Indulgent Damage	CD	MR-125
The Demonics	Formaldehyde Injection	CD	MR-126
The Fuckemos	Can Kill You	CD	MR-127
The Fuckemos	Black Helicopters	CD	MR-128
Soulpreacher	Sonic Witchcraft	CD	MR-129
Iron Monkey	We've Learned Nothing	10"	MR-130
Church of Misery	Murder Company	10"	MR-131
Iron Monkey / Church of Misery	We've Learned Nothing / Murder Company split	CD	MR-132
Nebula	Sun Creature	10"/CD	MR-133
Dozer	In the Tail of a Comet	CD	MR-134
Dozer	In the Tail of a Comet	10"	MR-135
Vodka Collins	Tokyo - New York	CD	MR-136
Melvins	Interstellar Overdrive 10"		MR-137
The Demonics	Demons on Wheels	CD	MR-138
Goatsnake	Flower of Disease	CD	MR-139
Cavity	Supercollider	CD	MR-140
Queens of the Stone Age/Beaver	The Split CD	CD/10"	MR-141
The Vectors	Some Raging Rock-n-Roll II	10"	MR-142
Fatso Jetson	Flames for All	10"	MR-143
Fatso Jetson	Flames for All	CD	MR-143CD
Lost Goat	Equator	CD	MR-144
Stone Fox	Totally Burnt	CD	MR-145
L7	Live: Omaha to Osaka	CD	MR-146
Gaza Strippers	Laced Candy	10"/CD	MR-147
Stisism	Coping With Society	CD	MR-148
Turbonegro	Apocalypse Dudes	LP/CD	MR-149
River City Rapists	River City Rapists	10"	MR-150
Queens of the Stone Age	Queens of the Stone Age	LP	MR-151
The Bulemics	Blurred Vision & Twisted Thoughts	10"	MR-152
The Bulemics/River City Rapists	split	CD	MR-153
Alabama Thunderpussy	River City Revival	CD	MR-154
The Hellacopters	Doggone Your Bad Luck Soul	10"	MR-155
Greenmachine	The Earth Beater	10"/CD	MR-156
Fu Manchu	Eatin' Dust	10"	MR-157
Fu Manchu	Eatin' Dust	CD	MR-158
Sons of Otis	Templeball	CD	MR-159
Beaver	Lodge	10"	MR-160
Beaver	Lodge	CD	MR-161
Mass	Mass	CD	MR-162
Fu Manchu	Godzilla's/Eatin' Dust	LP	MR-163
MISSING			MR-164
MISSING			MR-165
MISSING			MR-166
Hammerlock	Anthems for Outlaws	CD	MR-167
MISSING			MR-168
Robots	The Good Times Are Killing Me 10"		MR-169
The Robots	The Day of the Robots	CD	MR-170
Earthlings?	Human Beans LP #1 - Pete Stahl	LP	MR-171
Earthlings?	Human Beans LP #2 - Dave Catching	LP	MR-172
Earthlings?	Human Beans LP #3 - Fred Drake	LP	MR-173
Goatsnake	Goatsnake Vol. 1	LP/CD	MR-174
Unida	Coping with the Urban Coyote	CD	MR-175
Unida	Coping with the Urban Coyote LP (test pressing only)		MR-176
Alabama Thunderpussy	Constellation	CD	MR-177
Tummler	Queen to Bishop IV	CD	MR-178
MISSING			MR-179
MISSING			MR-180
The Fuckemos	Airshow 2000	CD	MR-181
Euroboys	1999 Man	10"	MR-182
Brant Bjork	Jalamanta	CD	MR-183
Hot Rod Honeys	Horny and Hungry	CD	MR-184
Euroboys	1999 Man EP	CD	MR-185
Che	Sounds of Liberation	CD	MR-186
Natas	Ciudad de Brahman	CD	MR-187
MISSING			MR-188
Antiseen	Southern Hostility/Eat More Possum	CD	MR-189
MISSING			MR-190
Hellstomper	Hillbilly Motherfucker	CD	MR-191
The Men of Porn	Porn, American Style	CD	MR-192
High on Fire	The Art of Self Defense	CD	MR-193
MISSING			MR-194
MISSING			MR-195
Euroboys	Long Day's Flight 'till Tomorrow CD		MR-196
Euroboys	Long Day's Flight 'till Tomorrow 2LP	2LP/CD	MR-197
Sons of Otis	SpaceJumboFudge	CD	MR-198
Earthlings?	Human Beans	CD	MR-199
MISSING			MR-200
MISSING			MR-201
Suplecs	Wreslin' with My Lady Friend	CD	MR-202
MISSING			MR-203
Disengage	Obsessions Become Phobias	CD	MR-204
MISSING			MR-205
The Cutthroats 9	The Cutthroats 9		MR-206
Acid King/The Mystick Krewe of Clearlight	Free.../The Father, the Son and the Holy Smoke split	CD	MR-2001
Melvins	Electroretard	CD	MR-2002
Melvins	Electroretard	LP	MR-2003
Drunk Horse	Tanning Salon/Biblical Proportions	CD	MR-2004
The Heads	Everybody Knows We Got Nowhere	CD	MR-2005
MISSING			MR-2006
Croatan	Curse of the Red Queen	CD	MR-2007
Operator Generator	Polar Fleet	CD	MR-2008
MISSING			MR-2009
Dozer	Madre de Dios	CD	MR-2010
MISSING			MR-2011
Beaver	Mobile	CD	MR-2012
MISSING			MR-2013
MISSING			MR-2014
Backbiter/Elope	Split	CD	MR-2015
Acid King/The Mystick Krewe of Clearlight	Split CD		MR-2016
MISSING			MR-2017
Suplecs	Sad Songs... Better Days	CD	MR-2018
Trailer Hitch	Truth Is Fighting	CD	MR-2019
Altamont	Our Darling	CD	MR-2020
MISSING			MR-2021
MISSING			MR-2022
Bottom	Feels So Good When You're Gone	CD	MR-2023
Begotten	Begotten	CD	MR-2024

== See also ==
- Man's Ruin Records
