= Joey Osbourne =

American drummer

Joey Osbourne is a founding member and drummer for Acid King, Altamont, and The Stimmies. He has also been a drummer for The Men of Porn, Triple X (an X cover band), and for San Francisco punk band The Corruptors. Currently, he is the drummer and backing vocalist for roots rock/dark folk band Saturn Returns, which features ex-members of Lost Goat and Nite After Nite as well as members of Old Grandad and Walken.

== Discography ==
=== with Acid King ===
Date of Release	Title	Label
1994	Acid King (EP)	Sympathy for the Record Industry
1995	Zoroaster	Sympathy for the Record Industry
1997	Down with the Crown (EP)	Man's Ruin Records
1999	Busse Woods	Man's Ruin Records
2001	Free... (EP)	Man's Ruin Records
2005	Acid King III	Small Stone Records
2006	The Early Years (Compilation album)	Small Stone Records

=== with Altamont ===
Date of Release	Title	Label
May 27, 1997	Wanted Dead or Alive (EP, split album with Acid King)	Man's Ruin Records
October 13, 1998	Civil War Fantasy	Man's Ruin Records
March 26, 1999	In the Groove (compilation album, "Rattlesnake Shake")	The Music Cartel
July 10, 2000	Right in the Nuts (compilation album, "Make It")	Small Stone Records
May 1, 2001	Our Darling	Man's Ruin Records
November 1, 2005	The Monkee's Uncle	AntAcidAudio

=== with Porn (The Men Of) ===
Date of Release	Title	Label
1999	Porn American Style	Man's Ruin Records
July 10, 2000	Right In The Nuts (compilation album, "Lightning Strikes")	Small Stone Records

=== with The Stimmies ===
Date of Release	Title	Label
1993	Pet/C'mon (single)	Perseverator Records
1994	Pet	Perseverator Records
1994	Germ's Choice '94 (compilation album, "Pet")	911 Records
