= Half Man =

Half Man may refer to:

- Half Man (band), a Swedish blues rock band
- Half-Man, a French fairy tale
- Half Man (TV series), a 2026 British/American television series

== See also ==
- Category:Human hybrids
- Halber Mensch (English: Half Man), a 1985 album by Einstürzende Neubauten
- "Half a Man", a song by Willie Nelson
- Half a Man (film), a 1925 silent film
- "Half a Man", a song by Dean Lewis from A Place We Knew
- Half the Man (disambiguation)
- Halfmens or Pachypodium namaquanum, a succulent plant
