= Ciudad de Brahman =

Studio album by Los Natas
- Released: September 24, 1999
- Recorded: January 1999
- Studio: Louder Studios, San Francisco
- Genre: Stoner rock
- Label: Man's Ruin Records
- Producer: Dale Crover & Los Natas

Los Natas chronology
Delmar (1998)	Ciudad de Brahman (1999)	Corsario Negro (2002)

Professional ratings
Review scores
Source	Rating
Allmusic	4.5/5 stars

Ciudad de Brahman (in English, Brahman's City) is the second studio album by Argentine stoner rock band Los Natas, released in 1999 by Man's Ruin Records.

The album was recorded in January 1999 at the Louder Studios, in San Francisco, property of engineer Tim Green, and produced by the Melvins member Dale Crover.

It was later re-released in Germany by Elektrohasch Schallplatten, in Argentina by South American Sludge, and on the box set Bee Jesus, which compiles this album, along with Delmar and the El Gobernador EP.

== Track listing ==
1. "Carl Sagan 1" - 3:41
2. "Meteoro 2028" - 4:34
3. "Tufi Meme" - 5:55
4. "La ciudad de Brahman" - 4:54
5. "Siluettle" - 2:14
6. "Brisa del desierto" - 2:09
7. "Paradise" - 4:12
8. "Alohawaii" - 4:18
9. "Adolescentes" - 4:25
10. "999" - 1:58
11. "Resplandor" - 3:01
12. "Rutation" - 3:06
13. "Polvareda" - 3:44
14. "Nadha" - 3:00

== Personnel ==
- Guitar and Vocals: Sergio Chotsourian
- Drums: Walter Broide
- Bass Guitar: Miguel Fernandez
- Hawaiian Guitar & Piano: Dale Crover

== Additional information ==
- Recorded in January 1999 at Louder Studios, San Francisco, California
- Mastered at Fantasy Studios, USA
- Produced by Dale Crover and Los Natas
- Artwork by Frank Kozik
