= Rise Again (Alabama Thunderpussy album) =

Studio album by Alabama Thunderpussy
- Released: June 23, 1998
- Recorded: November 1997
- Genre: Stoner metal; southern metal
- Length: 58:41
- Label: Man's Ruin; Relapse (2004 reissue)
- Producer: Alabama Thunderpussy & Mark Miley

Alabama Thunderpussy chronology
| Rise Again (1998) | River City Revival (1999) |

Professional ratings
Review scores
| Source | Rating |
|---|---|
| AllMusic | 4/5 stars |

Rise Again is the debut album by American heavy metal band Alabama Thunderpussy. The album was released in 1998.

== Track listing ==
1. "Falling Behind" - 4:42
2. "Victory Through Defeat" - 4:26
3. "Folk Lore" - 5:06
4. "Lord's Prayer" - 3:05
5. "Get Mad/Get Even" - 6:41
6. "When Mercury Drops" - 4:30
7. "Ivy" - 4:08
8. "Speaking in Tongues" - 7:25
9. "Jackass" - 3:05
10. "Alto Vista" - 5:56
11. "Podium" - 3:21
12. "Fever 103" - 5:37
13. "Dixie" - 0:34

== Personnel ==
- Johnny Throckmorton - vocals
- Erik Larson - guitar
- Asechiah "Cleetus LeRoque" Bogden - guitar
- Bill Storms - bass
- Bryan Cox - drums

=== Production ===
- Arranged by Alabama Thunderpussy
- Produced by Alabama Thunderpussy and Mark Miley
- Engineered and mixed by Mark Miley
- Mastered by Bill McElroy
