= Down with the Crown =

EP by Acid King
- Released: July 29, 1997
- Genre: Stoner metal
- Length: 21:50
- Label: Man's Ruin Records
- Producer: Billy Anderson

Acid King chronology
| Zoroaster (1995) | Down with the Crown (1997) | Busse Woods (1999) |

Professional ratings
Review scores
| Source | Rating |
|---|---|
| AllMusic | 4/5 stars |

Down with the Crown is an EP by stoner metal band Acid King. It was released twice in 1997 through Man's Ruin Records.

The EP was first released in July 1997, on 10" vinyl, and featured three Acid King songs.

The EP was reissued a month later on CD, as a split release with Altamont. This CD features the three Acid King songs, in addition to five Altamont songs. The Altamont portion is entitled Wanted Dead or Alive. It was released while Acid King frontwoman Lori S. and Altamont frontman Dale Crover were married.

The cover artwork features a topless girl playing air guitar with a pentagram drawn across her chest. The identity of the girl was often thought to be Acid King's frontwoman Lori S., however, in an interview she revealed this to be untrue, and revealed its origin: "Actually, I have this Jimi Hendrix poster in my rehearsal space with him playing guitar like that and the logo in the same typeface..."

Down with the Crown is the only release to feature Dan Southwick performing bass for Acid King.

== Track listing ==
1. "Teen Dusthead" – 4:11
2. "Full Reverse" – 4:12
3. "Phase II" – 13:24

== Credits ==
- Lori S. – vocals, guitar
- Dan Southwick – bass
- Joey Osbourne – drums
- Billy Anderson – engineer
- Dale Crover – engineer
- Tom Baker – mastering
