= The Early Years (Acid King album) =

Compilation album by Acid King
- Released: October 9, 2006
- Recorded: 1994–1995
- Genre: Stoner metal
- Length: 57:32
- Label: Leaf Hound Records
- Producer: Billy Anderson and Acid King

Acid King chronology
III (2005)	The Early Years (2006)	Middle of Nowhere, Center of Everywhere (2015)

The Early Years is a compilation album by stoner metal band Acid King. It was released in October 2006 through Leaf Hound Records. It combines Acid King's first two releases, which are both out of print. The songs were remastered by Billy Anderson.

These releases are:

- Acid King (EP) – the band's debut EP, released in 1994.
- Zoroaster – the band's debut album, released in 1995.

== Track listing ==
1. "Lead Paint" – 4:36
2. "Blasting Cap" – 4:43
3. "Drop" – 7:02
4. "The Midway" – 2:05
5. "Evil Satan" – 7:55
6. "If I Burn" – 3:43
7. "One Ninety-Six" – 4:22
8. "Vertigate #1" – 3:47
9. "Tank" – 3:53
10. "Dry Run" – 4:16
11. "Fruit Cup" – 2:00
12. "Queen of Sickness" – 5:15
13. "Reload" – 3:22
14. "Vertigate #2" – 2:33

== Credits ==
- Lori S. – vocals, guitar
- Peter Lucas – bass, backing vocals
- Joey Osbourne – drums
- Dale Crover – additional vocals
- Billy Anderson – engineering, remastering
- Ricky Kasso – man on cover artwork (note: the cover artwork is identical to the Acid King EP)
