= Halfway to Gone =

- Origin: New Jersey, United States
- Genres: Heavy metal; Southern rock; Hard rock; Stoner rock; Doom metal Sludge metal
- Years active: 1999-2012
- Label: Small Stone Records
- Members: Lou Gorra; Lee Stuart; Danny Gollin
- Past members: Kenny Wagner-Drums; Chuck Dukehart-Drums

Halfway to Gone is an American heavy metal band from New Jersey. The band formed in 1999 when bassist and founding member of Solarized, Lou Gorra got together with Lee Stuart (Solarized's touring guitarist), and drummer Danny Gollin. Chuck Dukehart from Sixty Watt Shaman played drums in the band for a year before being replaced by Kenny Wagner, also of Sixty Watt Shaman and Honky, who toured with them and played on Second Season. The band did U.S. tours and played shows with Clutch, Nashville Pussy, Nebula, CKY, Suplecs, and many others. The band's style has been described as a mixture of stoner rock, Southern rock and heavy metal, inspired by Lynyrd Skynyrd and Black Sabbath, among others. They released an album with Alabama Thunderpussy in 2000 and their own debut early the next year. They have released two more albums since. They went on extended hiatus in 2004 but are rumored to be doing another album in 2012 with original line up of Stu, Danny, and Lou on Smallstone Records.

== Discography ==
- Split w/Alabama Thunderpussy (2000 Underdogma/Game Two Records)
- High Five (2001, Small Stone)
- Second Season (2002, Small Stone)
- Halfway to Gone (2004, Small Stone)

== Media appearances ==
Their song "Escape From Earth" was featured in the cult film, The Sasquatch (Dumpling) Gang.

The song "Great American Scumbag" is in the horror movie Cabin Fever 2: Spring Fever.

The song "Black Coffy" appears in the film, Waitress.

The song "Turnpike" appears in the games Monster Jam: Urban Assault, ESPN NHL 2K5, and ESPN College Hoops 2K5.

The song "King of Mean" also appeared in the games ESPN NHL 2K5, ESPN NHL 2K6, and ESPN College Hoops 2K5.
