= Antiseen =

American punk rock band

- Origin: Charlotte, North Carolina, U.S.
- Genres: Punk rock, hardcore punk, cowpunk
- Years active: 1983–present
- Members: Jeff Clayton; Walt Wheat; Barry Hannibal; Malcolm Tent
- Past members: Joe Young (deceased); Mad Brother Ward; The Gooch; Doug Canipe; Greg Clayton; Dale Duncan; Marlon Cherry (deceased); Doug Throgmorton; Thomas O'Keefe; GG Allin (deceased); Tripp McNeill; Sir Barry Hannibal; Byron "Spitbubble" McDonald; Lee "Flea" Howard; Steve Sadler; Brad Keeter; Bill Cates (deceased); Mitch Cooper; Joe Williams; Dana "Ace" Davis; Jon Bowman; Phil Keller
- Website: Antiseen.com

Antiseen (often stylized as ANTiSEEN) is an American punk rock band formed in Charlotte, North Carolina, by Jeff Clayton and Joe Young in 1983. The name "Antiseen" serves as a deliberate deviation of the phrase "anti-scene" – the group not wishing to adhere to standard perceptions of punk rock in specific and rock music in general. Musically, Antiseen is influenced by groups such as the Ramones and Stooges, employing short, heavily distorted power chord-driven songs largely free of guitar solos or advanced musicianship. The band has a catalogue of over 100 LPs, EPs, CDs and DVDs recorded with various line-ups and have performed all over the world.

The band members consist of vocalist Jeff Clayton, bassist/drummer Sir Barry Hannibal, guitarist Walt Wheat, and bassist Malcolm Tent. Antiseen remains a performing and touring band.

== History and side projects ==
By the close of the decade the group tired of the routine and began to focus on shorter trips concentrating on individual regions (e.g. the west coast, east coast, midwest etc.) while returning to Europe for festivals.

Jeff Clayton created and edited a fanzine, New Breed, in which he announced the formation of Antiseen in Issue #3:

I'm starting up a new musical venture. hits [sic] called 'ANTi-SEEN'. Take that name any way you want to because we don't care. we are not a hardcore band in the sense of the way HC iz now.

In 1988 guitarist Joe Young released a solo EP, Bury The Needle, which featured several Antiseen members.

Jeff Clayton has recorded two solo EPs, 'Jeff Clayton & the Slimegoats' in 1988 and 'Jeff Clayton & the Mongrels' in 2009. The Mongrels featured Mike Hendrix of the Belmont Playboys on lead guitar.

GG Allin used Antiseen as his backing band on his Murder Junkies album. The band has stated that this album was a mixed blessing, saying that although they regret the "backing band" stigma that it gave them, they loved the way the album turned out.

Sometimes it seems like that's all people wanna talk about. I don't regret those days at all, but we have done more than just that. We miss GG a lot though. —Jeff Clayton

In late 1994, Barry Hannibal joined the band as the drummer and has been a part of the band ever since, excluding a 5-year hiatus starting in 2006 when his daughter was born. In 2013, he returned to the band as the bassist. He is the third longest reigning member, with only Clayton and Young having been in the band longer.

In 2003, Antiseen staged a 20th-anniversary concert in Charlotte which featured many past members of the group participating during the show. The set was professionally filmed and released on DVD.

In 2004, Steel Cage Records released a coffee table book entitled Destructo Maximus. The contents include interviews with current and past members of the band, testimonials of friends and fans, press clippings, reviews, and over 300 captioned photographs chronicling the band's history to that point. It also features fan artwork, a poster and flyer gallery, song lyrics, and a full discography.

In 2006, TKO Records released a tribute album entitled Everybody Loves Antiseen, which features 58 various artists including Hank III, ZEKE, Thomas O'Keefe, Chaos UK, Limecell, Texas Terri Bomb and Jeff Dahl, Simon Stokes and Blowfly.

On April 30, 2014, Clayton posted on his Facebook page that Young had died. It was later reported in local news that he died of a heart attack.

Antiseen has also collaborated with Hank Williams III. The band has appeared on split 7-inch EPs with Hank III, Electric Frankenstein, Brody's Militia, The Hookers, and Blowfly. Antiseen continues to play live tour dates.

== Style ==
=== Music and lyrics ===
Antiseen's lyrics deal with issues such as the military ("Stormtrooper", "Pledge Allegiance to the Bomb", "Warhero"), a love for the South ("Trapped in Dixie"), independence and pride ("Glad I Am The Way I Am", "Fuck All Y'All", "No Apologies"), songs supporting gun rights ("Guns Ablazin' "), and songs that defy political correctness ("Animals, Eat 'Em", "F.T.K.", "Spare Change", "Watch the Bastard Fry"). Antiseen's lyrics, which the band has described as satirical, are confrontational and caustic, and are typically written to intentionally stir reactions in listeners.

Clayton writes most of the band's lyrics, although on their most recent studio release, Badwill Ambassadors, Sir Barry Hannibal and Doug Canipe handled most of the songwriting duties. The band's instrumental work is fairly simplistic, as they rarely use guitar solos and mainly rely on using power chords in all guitar parts.

The band has written lyrics expressing their appreciation for professional wrestling by making musical tributes to various wrestlers, including Cactus Jack, Sabu, Terry Funk, and Abdullah the Butcher. Non-specific songs include "(I'm a) Babyface Killer" (sung from the viewpoint of a heel) and "From Parts Unknown" (a tribute to wrestlers who wear masks).

Additionally, Antiseen has covered songs by artists such as Hank Williams Sr., Skrewdriver, Ernest Tubb, Hellstomper, GG Allin, Anti-Nowhere League, Black Flag, Broken Talent, Alice Cooper, Dave Dudley, Bob Dylan, Roky Erickson, George Jones, The Kinks, Bachman–Turner Overdrive, Lynyrd Skynyrd, Blowfly, Curtis Mayfield, Roy Orbison, Ramones, Rancid Vat, Rose Tattoo, Steve Sadler, Jumping Gene Simmons, Jack Starr, Sun Ra, Screaming Lord Sutch, The Stooges, Talking Heads, The Trashmen, and The Troggs.

=== Live performances ===
Early Antiseen performances featured bizarre theatrical stage props involving mannequins, fake blood and pyrotechnics. Such performances found the group often banned from clubs unused to such presentations. Eventually the group tired of the logistics and legalities involved with a theatrical stage presentation and phased it out of their act, while increasing the physical mayhem of their stage antics – often destroying their own equipment. Vocalist Clayton began employing acts of self-mutilation, often cutting his face or arms with shards of broken glass or pounding his head with a microphone drawing blood and abrasions.

== Political views ==
Guitarist Joe Young was a member of the Libertarian Party, and stated that he had voted Libertarian since 1978. In 2000, Young ran for state house as a Libertarian. Young ran for city council in 2001.

The band members have stated that Antiseen is an apolitical band, although their songs have satirized extremist politics.

== Discography ==
- Honour Among Thieves (1988)
- Raw Shit (1989)
- Noise For The Sake Of Noise (1989)
- Destructo Blitzkrieg (1990)
- GG Allin & Antiseen: Murder Junkies (1991) (New Rose Records)
- Southern Hostility (1991) (Man's Ruin Records)
- Eat More Possum (1993) (Man's Ruin Records)
- GG Allin & Antiseen: Murder Junkies (1993) (Remastered) (Baloney Shrapnel Records)
- Hell (1994) (Baloney Shrapnel Records)
- Here To Ruin Your Groove (1996) (Baloney Shrapnel Records)
- 15 Minutes Of Fame, 15 Years Of Infamy (1999) (Steel Cage Records)
- The Boys From Brutalsville (2001)
- Screamin' Bloody Live (2002)
- Badwill Ambassadors (2004)
- Antiseen/Electric Frankenstein split 7-inch split single (January 11, 2005, TKO Records 135 (United States))
- Everybody Loves Antiseen (2006)
- New Blood (2012) (Switchlight Records)
- Falls Count Anywhere – A Collection Of Wrestling Songs (2012) (Rusty Knuckles)
- Live In Austin, TX (2012) (Digital Warfare Records)
- Live Possum (2013) (Jailhouse Records)
- We're # One! (2016) (TKO Records)
- Obstinate (2017) (TKO Records)
- Dying Breed (2018) (TKO Records)
- Great Disasters (2023) (Jack Hammer Music)

In addition to this, the band has released at least 35 different 7-inch vinyl records, including splits, live EPs and rare singles.

== Band members ==
=== Current members ===
- Jeff Clayton – vocals
- Sir Barry Hannibal – drums, backing vocals
- Walt Wheat – guitar
- Malcolm Tent – bass guitar, backing vocals

=== Former members ===
- Joe Young – Guitar (deceased)
- The Gooch – Drums
- Doug Canipe – Bass
- Greg Clayton – Drums
- Dale Duncan – Bass
- Marlon Cherry – Bass (deceased)
- Doug Throgmorton – Drums
- Thomas O'Keefe – Bass
- GG Allin – Vocals (deceased)
- Tripp McNeill – Bass
- Sir Barry Hannibal – Drums
- Byron "Spitbubble" McDonald – Drums (deceased)
- Lee "Flea" Howard – Bass
- Steve Sadler – Drums
- Brad Keeter – Drums (deceased)
- Bill Cates – Bass (deceased)
- Mitch Cooper – Drums
- Joe Williams – Bass/Keyboards
- Mad Brother Ward – Guitar
- Dana "Ace" Davis – Lead Guitar
- Jon Bowman – Bass
- Phil Keller – Drums
