= Busse Woods (album) =

Studio album by Acid King
- Released: January 1, 1999
- Genre: Stoner metal
- Length: 56:46
- Labels: Man's Ruin Records; Small Stone Records; Kreation Records
- Producer: Acid King

Acid King chronology
Down with the Crown (1997)	Busse Woods (1999)	Free... (2001)

Reissue cover

Professional ratings
Review scores
Source	Rating
AllMusic	3/5 stars

Busse Woods is an album by the stoner metal band Acid King. The album was released in 1999 by Man's Ruin Records; it was reissued in 2004, with bonus tracks, by Small Stone Records, and on vinyl in 2007 by Kreation Records.

The album's title (pronounced buss-ee) is the local name for the Ned Brown Forest Preserve, which is located near Chicago. As a teenager, frontwoman Lori S. often met there with friends to hang out and take drugs.

The reissue of Busse Woods has slightly different artwork and two extra songs, cover versions of "Motorhead", by Hawkwind, and "Not Fragile", by Bachman-Turner Overdrive. The cover versions were released on the compilation albums Daze of the Underground and In the Groove, respectively. "39 Lashes" is also a cover song, originally appearing in Jesus Christ Superstar.

Busse Woods is the only Acid King album with bass guitarist Brian Hill.

== Critical reception ==
The Austin Chronicle wrote that the album "may not be very inventive, but it sure is dark and heavy".

== Track listing ==
(All songs written by Lori S. unless noted)

1. "Electric Machine" – 6:25
2. "Silent Circle" – 7:30
3. "Drive Fast, Take Chances" – 8:32
4. "39 Lashes" (Andrew Lloyd Webber; Tim Rice) – 6:24
5. "Carve the 5" – 9:27
6. "Busse Woods" – 7:36
7. "Motorhead" (Lemmy Kilmister) – 4:42*
8. "Not Fragile" (C.F. Turner) – 6:04*

*Reissue bonus tracks

== Credits ==
- Lori S. – vocals, guitar
- Brian Hill – bass guitar
- Joey Osbourne – drums
- Billy Anderson – engineer
- Design – Lori S. and Dept. 8
- Additional art trickery – Andy Hunter, Scott Hamilton
- Photography – Erica Roewade, W. Web
