= The Hookers =

American hardcore punk band

- Origin: Lexington, Kentucky
- Genres: Hardcore punk, crossover thrash
- Years active: 1994–present
- Labels: Category:Musical groups disestablished in Mist, Sub Pop, Man's Ruin, Get Hip, Black Lung, Devil Doll, Scarey, Sack O Shit, Splattered!
- Members: Rock N' Roll Outlaw (vocals); Stoney Tombs (guitar); John Wayne Littlejohn (guitar); Dr Haj (guitar); Juan Badmutha (bass guitar); The Weedian (drums)
- Past members: Henry C. Bruening III; The Weedian; Thomas A Foolery; The Blizzard Of Hoz; Abba Zabba; Johnny 'Hot Rod' Evans; Rodney Rhodes; Pat Smith; Paul Bishop; Mark Terry; Dominic Cipolla; Mary Wooley; Donnie Razor; Buckshot; Doug Walker; Brian Omer; Corporal Ninny; Randy Romance; Uncle Eug
- Website: facebook.com/hookersvalhalla

The Hookers are an American hardcore punk band based in Louisville, Kentucky. Originally formed in Lexington in 1994 as the Fayette County Hookers, the name was shortened before their first independent release Kiss My Fuckin Ass 7-inch EP in 1996. Their first full-length album, Satan's Highway, was released on Scooch Pooch records in 1998 and followed closely by the Listen Up, Baby! split LP with Electric Frankenstein in the same year. On various independent labels, The Hookers released two more full-length albums: Black Visions of Crimson Wisdom in 1999 and Equinox Beyond Tomorrow Volume 1 in 2001. The band recorded the Blood Over Germany live album in 2001 on Century Media Records. After 2001, The Hookers were considered to be inactive as their heretofore intensive touring and release schedule was curtailed. Their song "The Legend of Black Thunder" was included on Tony Hawk's Underground videogame soundtrack in 2003. In 2008, the band put out an ersatz greatest hits record of live and unreleased tracks titled Ripped From The Crypt and once again became active with multiple EP and split EP releases. The Hookers toured in support of their fourth independent full length release, 2011's Horror Rises from the Tombs.

The Hookers have described their own sound as combining the "thunder of Blue Cheer, the speed of Motörhead and the teachings of Anton Lavey" (sic). The Hookers can also be compared to similar cross over thrash punk bands, such as Zeke and Antiseen, with the major guitar sound and vocal delivery being cribbed from heavy metal. Lead vocalist Adam Neal (aka Rock n' Roll Outlaw) credits having watched the film Werewolf vs The Vampire Women 27 times in a row as being influential in creating the image and lyrics of the band. The Hookers make extensive use of Satanic, sexual, fantastic and mythological imagery in their lyrics, as well as frequently referencing horror films, Vikings and biker culture.

== Members ==
Current lineup

- The Rock N Roll Outlaw – vocals
- Stoney Tombs – guitar
- John Wayne Littlejohn – guitar
- Dr Haj – guitar
- Juan Badmutha – bass guitar
- The Weedian – drums

== Discography ==
- Kiss My Fuckin Ass 7-inch (Smut-é, 1996)
- 12 Gauge Reaction 7-inch (Black Lung, 1997)
- Zombie Maker 7-inch (Sack O' Shit, 1997)
- Must Kill! Must Kill! 10-inch (Man's Ruin, 1998)
- Satan's Highway (Scooch Pooch, 1998)
- Listen Up, Baby! (split CD with Electric Frankenstein, Man's Ruin, 1998)
- Black Visions of Crimson Wisdom (Scooch Pooch, 1999)
- Black Magic Stallion 7-inch (Devil Doll, 1999)
- 12 Gauge Reaction 7-inch (rerelease, Black Lung, 1999)
- Halloween 7-inch (Black Lung, 1999)
- For Those About to Rot 7-inch (Sack O' Shit, 2000)
- Highway Star/Ready to Burn 7-inch (covers of Deep Purple and Krokus, Sub Pop, 2000)
- Equinox Beyond Tomorrow Volume 1 (Devil Doll, 2001)
- Blood Over Germany (Live, Century Media, 2001)
- God Made Me The Raven 7-inch (Get Hip, 2001)
- Split 7-inch with Antiseen (Steel Cage, 2002)
- Casting the Runes: From the Battle of Clontarf to the Gates of Valhalla (2-disc compilation, Devil Doll, 2005)
- Ripped From The Crypt (Live and Unreleased, 40 amp, 2008)
- Split 7-inch with Speedwolf (Splattered!, 2009)
- Split 7-inch with Hellstomper (Scarey, 2010)
- Be Careful with the Whore (split 7-inch with Harry Sons, Sonambulo, 2010)
- Horror Rises from the Tombs (Green Mist, 2011)
- Teenage Blood/Ride with the Angels 7-inch (Black Lung, 2012)
- Split 7-inch with The White Barons (I Hate People, 2012)
- Split 7-inch with The Egyptian Gay Lovers (Strange Magic Records & Cazzo Duro Records, 2014)
- It's Midnight...The Witching Hour! (Patac Records, 2014)
