= Los Natas =

Argentine stoner rock band

Natas
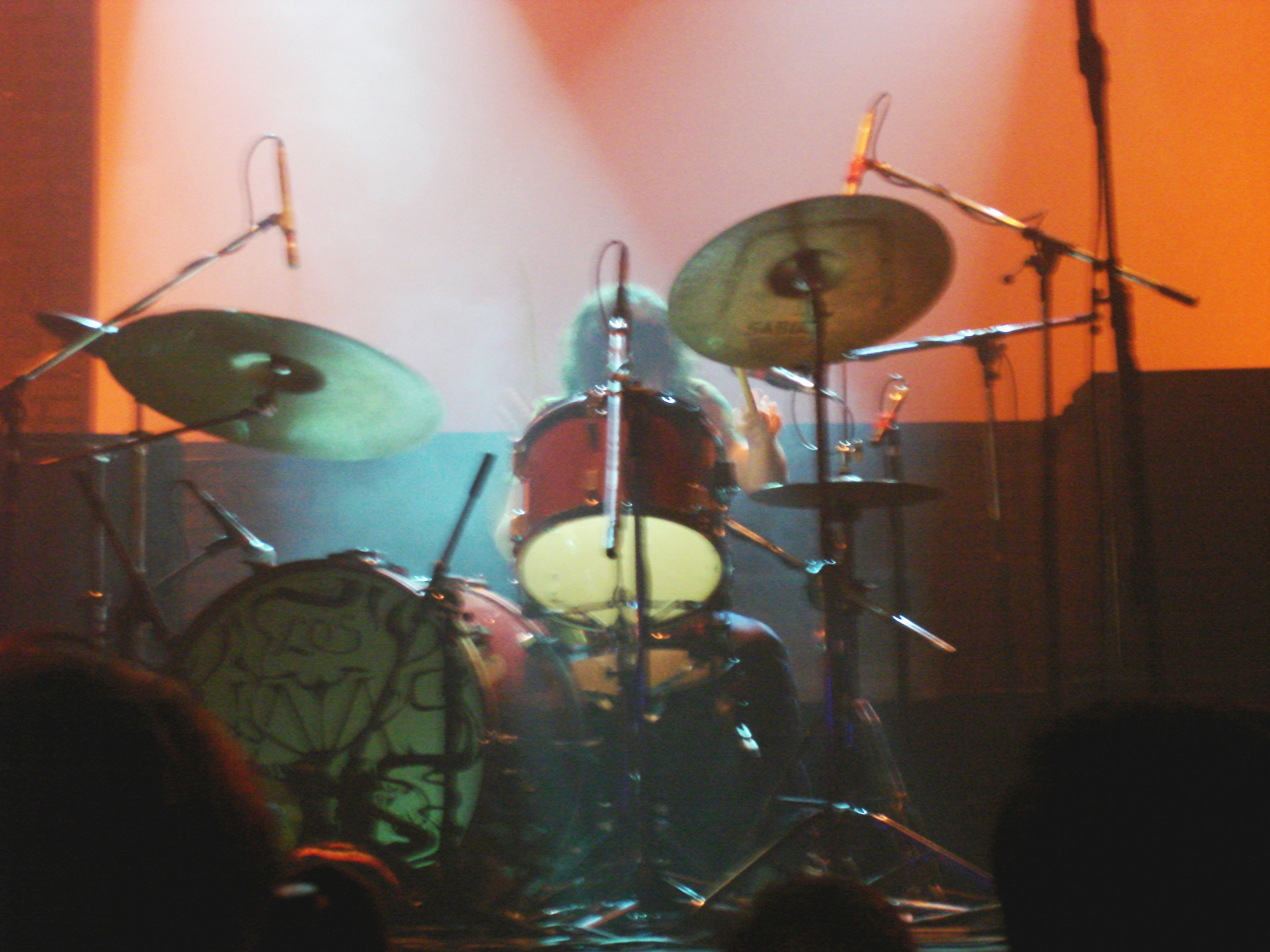

Background information
- Origin: Martínez, Buenos Aires, Argentina
- Genres: Stoner rock, experimental rock, psychedelic rock
- Years active: 1993–2012
- Labels: Man's Ruin Records, Small Stone, Oui Oui Records
- Members: Gonzalo Villagra; Sergio Chotsourian; Walter Broide
- Past members: Nicolás Gago
- Website: www.natasrock.com

Los Natas or Natas were an Argentine stoner rock band formed in 1993 in Martínez, Greater Buenos Aires. In their later releases, they had been leaning towards a more experimental sound described by them as free rock.

The group disbanded in 2012.

== Musical style ==
The band was first called Natas, eventually a conflict with a rap outfit of the same name occurred in the early 2000s, so they changed their name to Los Natas.

Their musical influences are varied, having the base of the raw and psychedelic sound of 1970s bands such as The Doors, Black Sabbath, The Who, Pink Floyd and Hawkwind, among others. Los Natas proposed a journey made of basic elements: valvular equipment and vintage instruments, they incorporated the use of the senses and perception of the listener as a part of a sonic trip. Their music changes constantly, supported by long jams that gave it a different meaning every time they executed it.

Since 1998, the music industry noticed the existence of bands with this musical influence spread around the globe. The scene was growing with the addition of CDs and LPs emerging as a new culture under global codes: the same love for music and the sound. As an answer to the mainstream began this new style under the name of stoner rock; nonetheless, the sound and music of Los Natas went beyond this classification, with the incorporation of Argentine folk instruments and the creation of a unique sound.

== Shows ==
Los Natas toured around the United States (1998-2000), Europe (2003-04) where they shared shows with important bands of the genre such as Queens of the Stone Age, Nebula, The Men of Porn, Unida, Dozer, Circle, Colour Haze, and Brant Bjork & the Bros., among others.

They played a series of thematic gigs called Viernes Verdes (Green Fridays) which had 10 editions and took place in Buenos Aires's main theaters: the band played while there were psychedelic projections in the background, becoming as relevant as the band itself. They also presented this performance in several provinces of Argentina.

Los Natas announced their disbandment in 2012 through their official Facebook page.

== Personnel ==
=== Band ===
- Sergio Chotsourian (Sergio Ch.): guitar, vocals, keyboards, flute, lute
- Gonzalo "Crudo" Villagra: bass, bombo legüero, laud, charango
- Walter Broide: drums, vocals, keyboards, sequencers, bombo legüero, trumpet

=== Collaborators/guests ===
- José "Topo" Armetta: vocals
- Dale Crover : Hawaiian guitar and piano
- Pablo Cattania: piano and Hammond
- "El Mono": didgeridoo
- Stefan Koglek: guitar

=== Former members ===
- Nicolás Gago
- Claudio Filadoro : bass
- Miguel Fernández : bass

== Discography ==
=== Studio albums ===
- Delmar (1998)
- Ciudad de Brahman (1999)
- Corsario Negro (2002)
- Toba Trance (2003)
- Toba Trance II (2004)
- München Sessions (2005)
- El Hombre Montaña (2006)
- Nuevo orden de la libertad (2009)

=== Compilations, splits and miscellanea ===
- Unreleased Dopes, compilation (1999)
- Natas / Dragonauta, split (2000)
- Bee Jesus, 2 CDs comprising Delmar & Ciudad de Brahman (2003)
- El universo perdido de Los Natas, vol. I/II, compilation of covers (2007)
- Los Natas / Solodolor, split (2008)

=== V/A compilations ===
- Skate Rock 4: Argentine compilation (1998)
- Welcome to MeteorCity (1998)
- Tiempos violentos: Argentine radio show compilation (1999)
- Right in the Nuts: tribute to Aerosmith, Small Stone Records (US) (2000)
- Blue Explosion: tribute to Blue Cheer (US) (2000)
- Inhale 420: The Stoner Rock Compilation (US) (2000)
- Sucking the 70's: compilation of 70s' rock songs by stoner rock (US) (2002)
- Rebirth of the Heavy: Bully Magazine compilation (US) (2002)
- The Ultimate Fuzzcollection: compilation (US) (2004)
- What's Your Function?: tribute to Franco Battiato (2004)
- Sabbath Crosses: tribute to Black Sabbath (2004)
- Listen Without Distraction: Argentine tribute to Kyuss (2004)
- Loco Gringos Have a Party: South American stoner rock compilation (2004)
- Niceto Mundo: Niceto's (A venue for bands to play) compilation (2004)
- Supernatural Extremities: Grinder Magazine compilation (Chile)
- Flying High: Australian issue compiled by Dale Crover (Australia)

== Selected events ==
- Delmar was chosen by stonerrock.com as one of the 10 best records of Stoner Rock in history.
- Ciudad de Brahman obtains reviews of 9/10 and 8/10 scores on specialized magazines: Kerrang, Metal Hammer, Spin and Rolling Stone.
- Ciudad de Brahman was produced by Dale Crover (of The Melvins) and recorded in the US.
- The artwork of Ciudad de Brahman and Delmar were made by the artist Frank Kozic.
- In 2000 Rolling Stone mag puts Los Natas as the Hot band of the year.
- Corsario Negro was produced by Billy Anderson.
- In 2004 they appeared on the cover of three rock supplements of the most important Argentine newspapers in less than six months.
- El Hombre Montaña was also produced by Billy Anderson.
