= Civil War Fantasy =

Studio album by Altamont
- Released: October 13, 1998
- Genre: Hard rock, heavy metal
- Label: Man's Ruin Records
- Producer: Billy Anderson

Altamont chronology
Wanted Dead or Alive (1997)	Civil War Fantasy (1998)	Our Darling (2001)

Professional ratings
Review scores
Source	Rating
Allmusic	link

Civil War Fantasy is the debut studio album by American hard rock band Altamont, released in 1998 through Man's Ruin Records.

== Track listing ==
1. "Civil War Fantasy" (Altamont) – 2:57
2. "Ezy Rider" (Jimi Hendrix) – 4:38
3. "Bitch Slap" (Altamont) – 4:19
4. "Whips" (Altamont) – 4:49
5. "My One Sin" (Altamont) – 2:33
6. "Makers Mark" (Altamont) – 2:50
7. "Black Tooth Powder" (Altamont) – 3:57
8. "Up River" (Altamont) – 4:56
9. "Downwind" (Altamont) – 3:30
10. "Smoke" (Altamont) – 6:34

== Personnel ==
- Dale Crover - Guitar, vocals
- Joey Osbourne - drums, vocals
- Dan Southwick - Bass
- Billy Anderson - Organ, vocals, Engineer, Producer
- George Horn - Mastering
