= Soulpreacher =

American progressive doom metal band

- Origin: Raleigh, North Carolina, United States
- Genres: Gothic metal Doom metal
- Years active: 1998 – present
- Members: Anthony Staton; Robb Hewlett; Chris Hill; Trent Giardino; Marc Campbell
- Past members: Michael Avery; Mark Schindler; Brian Watson
- Website: www.soulpreacher.net

Soulpreacher is an American progressive doom metal band from Raleigh, North Carolina, United States. Influenced by Pink Floyd, My Dying Bride, and Anathema, their music focuses on similar themes of isolation and desperation.

== Biography ==
Soulpreacher was formed in 1998 by Michael Avery, Anthony Staton, Mark Schindler, and Robb Hewlett. Their early sound focused primarily on hateful psychedelic doom metal. Mark Schindler parted ways early on, and Brian Watson was added to the lineup taking over on drums.

In 1999, Soulpreacher signed with the now defunct Man's Ruin Records founded by Frank Kozik, and soon released their debut studio album Sonic Witchcraft. It was noted by AllMusic as "a noteworthy and decent slice of alternative metal." The band went on to release the follow-up album When the Black Sunn Rises...the Holy Men Burn in 2000 on the Colorado label Game Two/Berserker Records.

Following Michael Avery's departure to law school in 2004, the band added Chris Hill and Trent Giardino. With the addition of the two new guitarists, the band's sound grew darker, and more melancholic.

In 2004, the band released the Lost Words Demo.

In 2012, Soulpreacher founding members Anthony Staton and Michael Avery reunited to create Horseskull, with drummer Eric B. and bassist Joseph Pautz. Pautz was later replaced by Soulpreacher bassist Robb Hewlett.

== Members ==
=== Current members ===
- Anthony Staton - vocals
- Robb Hewlett - bass
- Chris Hill - guitar
- Trent Giardino - guitar
- Marc Campbell - drums

=== Former members ===
- Michael Avery - guitar
- Mark Schindler - drums
- Brian Watson - drums

== Discography ==
=== Demos ===
- Worship Demo 1998
- Demo 2003
- Lost Words Demo 2004

=== Studio albums ===
- Sonic Witchcraft (1999, Man's Ruin)
- When The Black Sunn Rises... The Holy Men Burn (2000, Game Two/Berserker Records)

=== Compilation albums ===
- Transcendental Maggot (Meconium Records, 1999)
- Dreams of What Life Could Have Been (Psychedoomelic Records, 2004)
