= Staring at the Divine =

Studio album by Alabama Thunderpussy
- Released: April 30, 2002
- Recorded: April 1–12, 2001
- Genre: Stoner metal; southern metal
- Length: 48:01

Alabama Thunderpussy chronology
Constellation (2000)	Staring at the Divine (2002)	Fulton Hill (2004)

Staring at the Divine is the fourth studio album by American heavy metal band Alabama Thunderpussy. The album was released in 2002.

== Reception ==
Professional ratings
Review scores
Source	Rating
AllMusic	4/5 stars

Eduardo Rivadavia of AllMusic praised the album's "immense, memorable riffs" and wrote that it had more cohesiveness and focus than the band's prior album.

== Track listing ==
1. "Ol' Unfaithful" - 4:16
2. "Motor Ready" - 4:21
3. "Shapeshifter" - 4:12
4. "Whore Adore" - 4:39
5. "Hunting By Echo" - 4:34
6. "Beck and Call" - 3:45
7. "Twilight Arrival" - 6:44
8. "Esteem Fiend" - 6:11
9. "S.S.D.D." - 6:40
10. "Amounts That Count" - 2:39

== Personnel ==
- Johnny Throckmorton - vocals
- Erik Larson - guitar
- Ryan Lake - guitar
- Sam Krivanec - bass
- Bryan Cox - drums
