= Gaza Strippers =

American garage punk band

Gaza Strippers were an American garage punk band from Chicago formed by Rick Sims, who had previously played guitar with The Supersuckers and was the lead singer and lead guitarist of The Didjits. The band released its first single, "Transistor", in 1997 on Bam Bam Records. The group released its first full-length album, Laced Candy, on Man's Ruin Records in 1999, and its second, 1000 Watt Confessions, on Lookout! Records in 2000. They released their next album, Electric Bible, on Twenty Stone Blatt Records in 2000. The group's final full-length album, From the Desk of Dr. Freepill, was issued in 2002. Rick Sims and Mike Hodgkiss share lead guitar.

== Members ==
- Rick Sims - vocals, guitar
- Mike "Hadji" Hodgkiss - guitar
- Darren Hooper - bass
- Cory Stateler / Todd Marino / Mark Allen - drums

== Discography ==
- Laced Candy (Man's Ruin Records, 1999)
- 1000 Watt Confessions (Lookout! Records, 2000)
- Electric Bible: The New Testament (Triple X Records, 2001)
- From the Desk of Dr. Freepill (Nicotine Records, 2002)
