= Zoroaster (album) =

Studio album by Acid King
- Released: August 29, 1995
- Genre: Stoner metal
- Length: 41:07
- Label: Sympathy for the Record Industry

Acid King chronology
Acid King (1994)	Zoroaster (1995)	Down with the Crown (1997)

Professional ratings
Review scores
Source	Rating
Allmusic	4/5 stars

Zoroaster is the debut album by American stoner metal band Acid King. It was released in August 1995 on CD through Sympathy for the Record Industry. In 2006 it was combined with the band's debut EP, Acid King (EP), and released as the compilation album The Early Years.

Zoroaster was the last Acid King album to feature their original bassist, Peter Lucas.

== Track listing ==
All songs written by Lori S., except where noted.

No.	Title	Length
1.	"Evil Satan"	7:55
2.	"If I Burn" (co-written by Peter Lucas)	3:44
3.	"One Ninety-Six"	4:22
4.	"Vertigate #1"	3:48
5.	"Tank"	3:53
6.	"Dry Run"	4:16
7.	"Fruit Cup" (co-written by Peter Lucas)	1:59
8.	"Queen of Sickness"	5:15
9.	"Reload"	3:22
10.	"Vertigate #2"	2:31
Total length:		41:07

== Credits ==
- Lori S. – vocals, guitar
- Peter Lucas – bass, backing vocals
- Joey Osbourne – drums
- Billy Anderson – engineering
- Audrey Daniele – photography
- Bill George – artwork, layout design
