= Our Darling =

Studio album by Altamont
- Released: May 1, 2001
- Genre: Hard rock, heavy metal
- Label: Man's Ruin Records
- Producer: Tim Green

Altamont chronology
Civil War Fantasy (1998)	Our Darling (2001)	The Monkee's Uncle (2005)

Professional ratings
Review scores
Source	Rating
Allmusic	link

Our Darling is the second studio album by American hard rock band Altamont. Released in 2001, Our Darling was one of the last records released through Man's Ruin Records.

== Track listing ==
1. "Saint Of All Killers" – 4:42
2. "Short Eyes" – 2:20
3. "Our Darling" – 4:37
4. "Pirate Love" (Johnny Thunders) – 3:23
5. "Chicken Lover" – 3:05
6. "Dead Car" – 3:26
7. "Swami" – 3:51
8. "Peace Creep" – 3:05
9. "Stripey Hole" – 5:47
10. "Young Man Blues" (Mose Allison) – 9:01
11. "Hell's Angel Lullaby" – 2:06

== Personnel ==
- Dale Crover – Organ, Bass, Guitar, Percussion, Baritone, Vocals
- Joey Osbourne – Drums, Music box, Vocals
- Dan Southwick – Bass
- Tim Green – Engineer, Producer
- Sandris Rutmanis – Photography
- John Golden – Mastering
