= The Monkee's Uncle =

Studio album by Altamont
- Released: November 1, 2005
- Recorded: 2005
- Genre: Hard rock, heavy metal
- Length: 41:47
- Label: AntAcidAudio
- Producer: Toshi Kasai

Altamont chronology
Our Darling (2001)	The Monkee's Uncle (2005)

Professional ratings
Review scores
Source	Rating
AllMusic	3.5/5 stars

The Monkee's Uncle is the fourth studio album by American hard rock band Altamont. It was released in 2005 through AntAcidAudio.

== Critical reception ==
AllMusic wrote: "Highlights include the barnstorming album opener, 'Frank Bank,' the surprisingly up-tempo ditty 'El Stupido,' and the riff monster 'The Bloodening.'" SF Weekly wrote that the album "represents a merrily uneasy alliance betwixt headbanging and finesse." LA Weekly called the album "a binary black hole swallowing up pop and hard rock and spitting them out into other dimensions as noise and gentle terror."

== Track listing ==
1. "Frank Bank" (Altamont) – 3:25
2. "Bathroom Creep" (Altamont) – 2:51
3. "Dum Dum Fever" (Altamont) – 5:40
4. "El Stupido" (Altamont) – 4:40
5. "Laughing Boy" (Altamont) – 4:19
6. "Pedigree" (Altamont) – 3:19
7. "Monkee's Uncle" (Altamont) – 2:45
8. "The Bloodening" (Altamont) – 2:50
9. "Easter Sunday" (Altamont) – 7:09
10. "Bull Ramus" (Altamont) – 2:11
11. "In A Better World" (The Screamers) – 2:30

== Personnel ==
- Dale Crover - Vocals, Various instruments
- Dan Southwick - guitar, bass guitar, Drums
- Joey Osbourne - drums
- Toshi Kasai - piano, Organ, Engineer, Producer
- Sasha Popovich - drums
