= Fulton Hill (album) =

Studio album by Alabama Thunderpussy
- Released: May 25, 2004
- Recorded: February 2004
- Genre: Stoner metal; southern metal
- Length: 67:32
- Label: Relapse Records
- Producer: Mark Miley

Alabama Thunderpussy chronology
Staring at the Divine (2002)	Fulton Hill (2004)	Open Fire (2007)

Fulton Hill is the fifth studio album by American metal band Alabama Thunderpussy. The album was released in 2004.

== Release history ==
Fulton Hill was originally released on CD on May 25, 2004. Relapse Records released it on vinyl on June 8, in a pressing of 1,000 (500 on blue vinyl, 500 on black). An additional 100 copies were pressed onto clear vinyl, but these were not available to the public.

It was released on CD in Japan, with a bonus track, on August 29, 2005, via 3D Records.

== Track listing ==
1. "Such Is Life" - 4:24
2. "R.R.C.C." - 3:57
3. "Wage Slave" - 3:35
4. "Three Stars" - 5:25
5. "Bear Bating" - 7:23
6. "Infested" - 4:17
7. "Alone Again" - 6:57
8. "Lunar Eclipse" - 3:22
9. "Blasphemy" - 3:53
10. "Do Not" - 6:22
11. "Sociopath Shitlist" - 4:24
12. "Struggling For Balance" - 13:34
13. "Seekers" - 10:09 (bonus track on Japanese release)

== Personnel ==
- Johnny Weills - vocals
- Erik Larson - guitars, backing vocals
- Ryan Lake - guitars
- Bryan Cox - drums
- John Peters - bass
- Nathan Brown - piano, organ
- Alan Douches - mastering
- Scott C. Kinkade - photography
- Mark Miley - producer
