= Delmar (album) =

Studio album by Los Natas
- Released: July 10, 1998
- Recorded: Pichon Mobile Studio, Buenos Aires, 1996
- Genre: Stoner rock
- Label: Man's Ruin Records
- Producers: Los Natas, Pichon Dalpont

Los Natas chronology
Delmar (1998)	Ciudad de Brahman (1998)

Professional ratings
Review scores
Source	Rating
Allmusic	2/5 stars

Delmar is the debut album of Argentine stoner rock band, Los Natas, released in 1998 under the now defunct Man's Ruin Records. This material was first released in 1996, on cassette, an independent edition the band put out containing eight tracks.

== Track listing ==
1. "Samurai" - 5:08
2. "1980" - 2:39
3. "Trilogia" - 5:41
4. "I Love You" - 5:31
5. "Soma" - 6:47
6. "Mux Cortoi" - 2:58
7. "Delmar" - 4:01
8. "Windblows" - 5:05
9. "El Negro" - 5:37
10. "Alberto Migré" - 6:12

== Personnel ==
- Sergio Chotsourian - Guitar, Vocals
- Walter Broide - Drums, Vocal
- Miguel Fernandez - Bass
- Nicolás Gago - Composition Collaborator
- Natas and Pichon Dalpont - Producers

Recorded at Pichon Mobile studios
