= Acid King (band) =

American metal band

- Origin: San Francisco, California, U.S.
- Genres: Stoner metal; doom metal; occult rock
- Years active: 1993–present
- Labels: Small Stone, Leaf Hound, Man's Ruin, Sympathy for the Record Industry
- Members: Lori S. Bryce Shelton; Jason Willer
- Past members: Dale Crover; Peter Lucas; Dan Southwick; Brian Hill; Guy Pinhas; Joey Osbourne; Mark Lamb; Rafa Martinez; Bil Bowman
- Website: acidking.com

Acid King is an American stoner metal band from San Francisco, California. It was formed in 1993 by frontwoman Lori S., drummer Joey Osbourne and bassist Peter Lucas. Acid King have since recorded four studio albums and two EPs with a series of bassists.

The band's name was inspired by the crimes of Ricky Kasso, who murdered his friend Gary Lauwers in Northport, New York on June 19, 1984. Kasso was nicknamed "Acid King" by his peers due to his chronic hallucinogenic drug use. The band's self-titled debut EP features a photograph of Kasso on its cover. The band itself has also been featured in two books – The Encyclopedia of Heavy Metal and the A to Z of Doom, Gothic & Stoner Metal – both published in 2003.

== Members ==
=== Current members ===
- Lori S. – guitar, vocals, lyrics (1993–present)
- Bryce Shelton – bass (2021-present)
- Jason Willer – drums (2021-present)

=== Previous members ===
- Peter Lucas – bass (1993–1996; appears on Acid King (EP) and Zoroaster)
- Dan Southwick – bass (1996–1998; appears on Down with the Crown)
- Brian Hill – bass (1998–1999; appears on Busse Woods)
- Guy Pinhas – bass (1999–2005; appears on Free... and Acid King III)
- Mark Lamb – bass (2007–2017; appears on Middle of Nowhere, Center of Everywhere)
- Joey Osbourne – drums (1993–2017)
- Rafa Martinez – bass (2005–2008, 2019)
- Bil Bowman – drums (2017–2021)

=== Session member ===
- Jason Landrian – guitar, keyboards (2020–present; appears on Beyond Vision)

== Discography ==
=== Studio releases ===
| Year | Title | Label | Notes |
|---|---|---|---|
| 1994 | Acid King (EP) | Sympathy for the Record Industry | reissued on The Early Years |
| 1995 | Zoroaster | Sympathy for the Record Industry | reissued on The Early Years |
| 1997 | Down with the Crown (EP) | Man's Ruin Records | reissued as a split with Altamont |
| 1999 | Busse Woods | Man's Ruin Records; Small Stone Records | reissued with bonus tracks in 2004 (Small Stone) reissued on vinyl in 2007 (Kreation) reissued on cd, cassette, and vinyl in 2019 (RidingEasy) |
| 2001 | Free... | Man's Ruin Records | released as a split with Clearlight |
| 2005 | Acid King III | Small Stone Records | reissued on vinyl in 2006 (Kreation) |
| 2006 | The Early Years | Leaf Hound Records | compilation containing remasters of Acid King and Zoroaster |
| 2015 | Middle of Nowhere, Center of Everywhere | Svart Records | |
| 2023 | Beyond Vision | Blues Funeral | |

=== Compilation appearances ===
- "Not Fragile" (BTO cover) on In the Groove (1999 The Music Cartel)
- "Motorhead" (Hawkwind cover) on Daze of the Underground (2003 Godreah Records)
- "The Stake" (Steve Miller Band cover) on Sucking the 70's – Back in the Saddle Again (2006 Small Stone Records)

"Not Fragile" and "Motorhead" included on re-release of Busse Woods.
