= Drunk Horse =

- Origin: Oakland, California, United States
- Genres: Stoner rock; hard rock
- Years active: 1998–present
- Labels: Man's Ruin Records; Tee Pee Records; Wantage USA
- Members: Cyrus Comiskey; Cripe Jergensen; Eli Eckert; Joel Robinow

Drunk Horse is a rock band from Oakland, California. Formed in 1998, the band released several albums on Man's Ruin Records before the label went out of business. The band then moved on to Tee Pee Records with 2003's Adult Situations, which was followed in 2005 by In Tongues. Drunk Horse has toured in the US and Europe. The band has played Austin, Texas' South by Southwest Festival several times.

== Members ==
=== Current ===
- Cyrus Comiskey
- Cripe Jergensen
- Eli Eckert
- John Niles

=== Former ===
- Joel Robinow
- Isaiah Mitchell
- Josh Smith

== Discography ==
=== Albums ===
- Drunk Horse CD, Man's Ruin Records (1999)
- Drunk Horse LP, Man's Ruin Records/Oakland Pants Factory (1999)
- Tanning Salon/Biblical Proportions CD, Man's Ruin Records (2001)
- Adult Situations CD, Tee Pee Records (2003)
- In Tongues CD/LP, Tee Pee Records/Wantage USA (2005)
- Live in Utah CD, Silver Current Records (2014)

=== Singles/EPs ===
- Bambi/Dirty Mind 7", Wantage USA
- Unearthed Gems Vol. 2 7"
- "Independent Type / Joint of Lamb" Split Single w/ The Feather (Delboy Records) 2004

=== Compilation appearances ===
- Oakland The Secret is Out "One Track Woman" CD, Warm and Fuzzy Records
- Port Lite Compilation "Secret Ingredient" CD, Food Stamp Records (2000)
- Right In The Nuts: A Tribute to Aerosmith "Kings and Queens" CD, Man's Ruin Records
- Wantage USA's 21st Release Hits Omnibus 2XCD, Wantage USA

== Influence ==
Author Ned Vizzini's novel Be More Chill, about a guy who takes a pill called a squip that makes him cooler, was partly inspired by "AM/FM Shoes", a song from Tanning Salon/Biblical Proportions. He writes that "'AM/FM Shoes' is about a guy who feels like a loser, except he has special shoes that play the radio, and when he puts them on, he becomes the coolest guy around."
