= Middle of Nowhere, Center of Everywhere =

Studio album by Acid King
- Released: April 17, 2015
- Genre: Stoner metal
- Length: 53:32
- Label: Svart Records
- Producer: Billy Anderson and Acid King

Acid King chronology
The Early Years (2005)	Middle of Nowhere, Center of Everywhere (2015)

Middle of Nowhere, Center of Everywhere is the fourth studio album by stoner metal band Acid King. It was released in April 2015 through Svart Records. This album comes after a decade long hiatus related to personnel changes in the band.

== Track listing ==
1. "Intro" – 3:53
2. "Silent Pictures" – 9:18
3. "Coming Down from Outer Space" – 5:47
4. "Laser Headlights" – 6:52
5. "Red River" – 8:26
6. "Infinite Skies" – 7:50
7. "Center of Everywhere" – 8:45
8. "Outro" – 2:37

== Credits ==
- Lori S. – vocals, guitar
- Mark Lamb – bass, additional guitar on "Infinite Skies"
- Joey Osbourne - drums
- Rafa Martinez – Hammond B-3 on "Red River", additional guitar on "Infinite Skies"
- Billy Anderson – engineering, mixing
- Toshi Kasai – engineering
- Justin Weis – mastering
- Tim Lehi – cover artwork
