= Operator Generator =

American stoner rock band

- Origin: San Jose, California, United States
- Genres: Heavy metal, stoner rock, hard rock, rock
- Years active: 1997–present
- Labels: 12th Records, Man's Ruin Records
- Members: Mitchell French; Thomas Choi; Joe Tucci; Michael Parkinson
- Past members: Anthony Lopus
- Website: www.operator-generator.com

Operator Generator was an American stoner rock band from San Jose, California. They were formed in the late 1990s and released their first self-titled EP in the winter of 1999 under 12th Records. Over a year later they released their debut album titled Polar Fleet under Man's Ruin Records.

== Discography ==
=== Self-titled EP, 2000 ===
Operator Generator (self-titled EP), 2000 (12th Records)

Track listing

1. "Arctic Quest"
2. "Infinite loop"
3. "Equinox Planetarium"

Three of the original recordings released prior to the co-ordinated KOZIK release on Man's Ruin Records Operator Generator "Polar Fleet" in the year 2001. (Recorded with their original drummer Anthony Lopus.)

== Polar Fleet, 2001 ==
(Full-length album) Polar Fleet, 2001 (Man's Ruin Records)

Track listing

1. "Equinox Planetarium"
2. "Polar Fleet"
3. "Museum's Flight"
4. "Atmospheric Insect/Launch"
5. "Quaintance of Natherack"
6. "Arctic Quest"
7. "Infinite Loop"
8. "Soil of Lavermore"

== Polar Fleet, 2015 Re-Release ==
According to Joe Tucci, the bass player from the band, 2001's Polar Fleet will be remastered and re-released under Twin Earth Records with brand new artwork.
