= The Difference Engine (album) =

Studio album by Beaver
- Released: 1997
- Recorded: Fall 1997
- Studio: Via Ritmo Studio, Rotterdam
- Genre: Stoner rock
- Length: 43:37
- Label: Elegy
- Producer: Beaver & Jacques de Haard

Beaver chronology
13eaver (1996)	The Difference Engine (1997)	The Split CD (1998)

The Difference Engine is the second studio album by stoner rock band Beaver, released on Elegy Records in 1997.

== Track listing ==
All songs written by Beaver.

1. "On Parade"
2. "Enter The Treasury"
3. "The Reaper"
4. "Magic 7"
5. "Friendly Planet"
6. "Green"
7. "Surrender"
8. "Supernova"
9. "A Premonition"
10. "Infinity's Blacksmith"

== Personnel ==
- Roel Schoenmakers – guitars, vocals
- Joszja De Weerdt – guitars
- Milo Beenhakker – bass
- Eva Nahon – drums

== Production ==
- Produced by Beaver and Jacques de Haard, except "Green" produced by Josh Homme, Dave Catching and Hutch
- Recorded at Via Ritmo Studio, Rotterdam
- Mastered by Fir Suidema
- Graphics by Beaver and Jason
