= Altamont (band) =

US musical group

- Origin: San Francisco, California, U.S.
- Genres: Rock
- Years active: 1994–present
- Labels: Man's Ruin, AntAcidAudio
- Spinoff of: Acid King, Melvins
- Members: Dale Crover; Joey Osbourne; Dan Southwick
- Website: melvins.com/altamont

Altamont is a hard rock band from San Francisco, California. It was formed in 1994 as a side project by Dale Crover, drummer of the Melvins, along with Joey Osbourne and Dan Southwick of Acid King. The band is named after the infamous Altamont Free Concert of 1969.

== Band members ==
- Dale Crover – guitar, vocals
- Joey Osbourne – drums, vocals
- Dan Southwick – bass

== Discography ==
=== Studio albums ===
Date of release	Title	Format	Label	Catalog number
May 27, 1997	Wanted Dead or Alive	Red 10-inch vinyl	Man's Ruin Records	MR-072
October 13, 1998	Civil War Fantasy		Man's Ruin Records	MR-085
May 1, 2001	Our Darling		Man's Ruin Records	MR-2020
November 1, 2005	The Monkee's Uncle		AntAcidAudio	AAA-995

=== Compilation appearances ===
- In the Groove CD (1999, The Music Cartel)
- Right in the Nuts: A Tribute to Aerosmith CD (2000, Small Stone Records)
