= Alabama Thunderpussy =

American heavy metal band

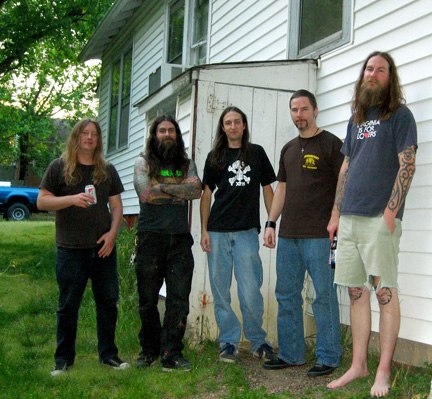
- Alabama Thunderpussy in 2006

Background information
- Origin: Richmond, Virginia, U.S.
- Genres: Heavy metal; stoner metal; southern metal
- Years active: 1996–2008, 2022–present
- Labels: Man's Ruin; Relapse
- Past members: Kyle Thomas; Erik Larson; Ryan Lake; Mikey Bryant; Bryan Cox; Johnny Throckmorton; Johnny Weills; Asechiah Bogdan; Bingo Tunnel; John Peters

Alabama Thunderpussy, originally spelled Alabama Thunder Pussy, is an American heavy metal band from Richmond, Virginia. It was founded by Bryan Cox, Erik Larson and Asechiah Bogdan in 1996.

== History ==
Bryan Cox, Erik Larson and Asechiah Bogdan founded ATP in 1996. Bill Storms and Johnny Throckmorton completed the lineup, and the band signed to Man's Ruin Records in 1998. They released their debut album Rise Again later that year and recorded River City Revival, which was released in 1999. 2000 brought Constellation.

The band released a split with Halfway to Gone the same year. The split was the first time that the band was billed as Alabama Thunderpussy. 2002's Staring at the Divine followed. Alabama Thunderpussy parted ways with Man's Ruin and singer Johnny Throckmorton later that year, signing to Relapse Records and hiring new frontman Johnny Weills. Weills performed vocals on the album Fulton Hill, released in May 2004. By the time of the following album, Open Fire, Weills had left the band to form Danballah in Columbus, Ohio. He was replaced by Kyle Thomas, formerly of New Orleans bands Floodgate and Exhorder.

Members of ATP have appeared in many side projects. Larson has released two discs under his name, the most recent in 2005. Larson has also appeared in the side project Axehandle with Bryan Cox and Ryan Lake. Erik also appears in another side project group Birds of Prey with a release from July 25, 2006. Erik Larson was also the former drummer for AVAIL. Bryan Cox was a member of instrumental band Suzukiton and was on their one release, Service Repair Handbook. Bogdan was a member of Windhand between 2009 and 2015.

Former vocalist Johnny Throckmorton is now the vocalist for Richmond, Virginia-based Before the Machine.

Open Fire, the band's most recent CD, was released March 6, 2007, on Relapse Records.

In 2022, Alabama Thunderpussy announced their first tour since 2007.

== Line-up ==
- Kyle Thomas – vocals (2006–2008, 2022–present)
- Erik Larson – guitar (1996–2008, 2022–present)
- Ryan Lake – guitar (2001–2008, 2022–present)
- Sam Krivanec – bass (1998–2001, 2022–present)
- Bryan Cox – drums (1996–2008, 2022–present)

=== Former members ===
- Johnny Throckmorton – vocals (1996–2003)
- Johnny Weills – vocals (2003–2005)
- Asechiah "Cleetus LeRoque" Bogden – guitars (1996–2001)
- Bill Storms – bass (1996–1998; died 2001)
- John Peters – bass (2001–2005)
- Mike Bryant – bass (2006–2008)

== Discography ==
=== Albums ===
- Rise Again (1998)
- River City Revival (1999)
- Constellation (2000)
- Staring at the Divine (2001)
- Fulton Hill (2004)
- Open Fire (2007)

=== Split albums ===
- Alabama Thunderpussy/Halfway to Gone (2000)
- Orange Goblin/Alabama Thunderpussy (2000)

=== Live albums ===
- Live from the Relapse Contamination Festival (2008) [Digital release]

=== Compilations ===
- Right in the Nuts: A Tribute to Aerosmith (July 10, 2000), Small Stone Records
- Sucking the 70's (2002), Small Stone Records
- Sucking the 70's – Back in the Saddle Again (2006), Small Stone Records
- For the Sick (March 20, 2007) Emetic Records
- On Your Knees: The Tribute to Judas Priest (2007)
