= 13eaver (album) =

Studio album by Beaver
- Released: 1996
- Recorded: Spring 1995
- Studios: Via Ritmo, Rotterdam
- Genre: Stoner rock
- Label: W.E.R.K./WORKS
- Producers: Beaver & Jacques de Haard

Beaver chronology
13eaver (1996)	The Difference Engine (1997)

13eaver is the debut studio album by stoner rock band Beaver. It is currently out of print.

== Track listing ==
All songs written by Beaver.

1. "Piece of Mind"
2. "Drown"
3. "Dolphinity"
4. "Centaur"
5. "This Room"
6. "Decisions in Time"
7. "One Eye is King"
8. "Ripe Fruit"
9. "Snakes & Ladders"
10. "538810"
11. "Deep Hibernation"
12. "Miss Interpreter
13. "Infinity"

== Credits ==
- Produced by Beaver and Jacques de Haard
- Engineered by Jacques de Haard
- Mastered by Dr. Steentjes
- Re-mastered in 1999 by Jacques de Haard
