= Lodge (Beaver album) =

EP by Beaver
- Released: October 25, 1999
- Recorded: 1999
- Studio: The Void, Eindhoven, Holland
- Genre: Stoner rock
- Length: 28:15
- Label: Man's Ruin Records
- Producer: Beaver & Pidah

Beaver chronology
The Split CD (1998)	Lodge (1999)	Mobile (2001)

Lodge is the only EP, and the fourth release from Beaver, released on Man's Ruin Records.

== Track listing ==
All songs written by Beaver.

1. "Static" – 6:30
2. "Tarmac" – 3:48
3. "Repossessed" – 3:58
4. "Interstate" v 6:50
5. "I Reckon" – 7:07

== Credits ==
- Produced by Pidah and Beaver
- Engineered and mastered by Pieter Kloos
- Edited by Jacques de Haard
