= Open Fire (Alabama Thunderpussy album) =

Studio album by Alabama Thunderpussy
- Released: March 6, 2007
- Genre: Stoner metal; southern metal
- Length: 42:49
- Label: Relapse
- Producer: Ian Whalen

Alabama Thunderpussy chronology
Fulton Hill (2004)	Open Fire (2007)

Professional ratings
Review scores
Source	Rating
AllMusic	3.5/5 stars

Open Fire is the sixth and final studio album by American heavy metal band Alabama Thunderpussy. The album was released on March 6, 2007, via Relapse Records. It is the band's first album with new singer Kyle Thomas. The album cover was created by artist Ken Kelly.

== Track listing ==
1. "The Cleansing" - 3:58
2. "Void of Harmony" - 3:58
3. "Words of the Dying Man" - 3:21
4. "The Beggar" - 5:15
5. "None Shall Return" - 3:19
6. "Whiskey War" - 2:46
7. "A Dreamer's Fortune" - 3:47
8. "Valor" - 3:53
9. "Open Fire" - 3:42
10. "Brave the Rain" - 4:08
11. "Greed" - 4:42

The Japanese release also contained a bonus track, a cover of the Whitesnake song "Still of the Night".

== Personnel ==
- Kyle Thomas - vocals
- Ryan Lake - guitar
- Erik Larson - guitar
- Mike Bryant - bass
- Bryan Cox - drums
- Hormel Flansuego - percussion
