= Stisism =

American punk rock band

- Origin: Brooklyn, New York
- Genre: Punk rock
- Years active: 1983-1998
- Labels: Mutha Records, Intensive Scare Records, Man's Ruin Records, The Orchard
- Past members: Chris Curylo; Stu Pendis; Mikey Plague; Fiona Lynn

The Stisism Band, later known simply as Stisism, was an American punk rock band from Brooklyn, New York.

The Stisism Band formed in the early 1980s as the duo of Chris Curylo (vocals, guitar) and Stu Pendis (drums). The band played snotty, humorous 1977-style punk rock, influenced by the Sex Pistols. Tracks from self-released tapes like Dehydration Synthesis (1983) could often be heard on DJ Pat Duncan's long-running 1980s punk radio show on WFMU.

By the time of their first official record, a four-song 7-inch EP called Introducing.... Stisism, released in 1984 on Mutha Records, the band had been joined by lead vocalist Mikey Plague and bassist Fiona Lynn.

The March 1986 issue of Maximumrocknroll featured an extensive five-page interview with the band.

After a long silence, the band, with their name shortened simply to Stisism, returned in 1995 with the Punch in the Face EP, issued by Intensive Scare Records). followed by the 1996 7-inch single "Bacon Man". The band released their first full-length studio album, Coping With Society, in 1998, originally only on vinyl on Intensive Scare. It was issued on CD by Man's Ruin Records in 1999, and reissued in 2005 by The Orchard. In his review, AllMusic critic Alex Henderson said, "Recalling the Pistols, the Buzzcocks and others, Stisism brings a lot of exuberance and bratty aggression to this engaging album."

== Members ==
- Chris Curylo – vocals, guitar (1983–1986, 1995–1998)
- Stu Pendis – drums (1983–1986, 1995–1998)
- Mikey Plague – vocals (1984–1986, 1995–1998)
- Fiona Lynn – bass (1984–1986, 1995–1998)

== Discography ==
=== Studio albums ===
- Coping with Society (1998, Intensive Scare Records); 1999, Man's Ruin Records; 2005, The Orchard)

=== Singles and EPs ===
- Introducing Stisism 7-inch EP (1984, Mutha Records)
- Punch in the Face 7-inch EP (1995, Intensive Scare Records)
- "Bacon Man" 7-inch single (1996, Intensive Scare Records)

=== Cassette albums ===
- Dehydration Synthesis (1983, self-released)

=== Compilation appearances ===
- "Never" and "Bacon Man" featured on Mutiny on the Bowery cassette (1988, Mystic Records)
- "I'm a Corpse" and "Bacon Man" featured on Mutiny on the Bowery LP (1988, Mystic Records)
- "Go Tell Your Mother" featured on Bands Only a Mutha Could Love Volume I cassette (1988, Mutha Records)
- "Formaldehyde Baby" featured on It Comes from the East LP/CD (1996, Intensive Scare Records)
- "It's Over" featured on It Smells Like Spring LP (1997, Intensive Scare Records)
- "The First Time" featured on The 2nd Coming ... Frank Invites You to a Sonic Bowlingshow! 10-inch EP (1998, Frank Records)
