= Mobile (album) =

Studio album by Beaver
- Released: March 26, 2001
- Recorded: 2000
- Studio: The Void, Eindhoven, The Netherlands
- Genre: Stoner rock
- Label: Man's Ruin Records
- Producer: Pidah

Beaver chronology
Lodge (1999)	Mobile (2001)

Mobile is the third and final studio album by stoner rock band Beaver. Released in 2001, it was one of the last records released through Man's Ruin Records.

== Track listing ==
1. "Private Stash"
2. "At The Mirror Palace"
3. "End Of A Rope"
4. "Cir"
5. "Liberator"
6. "9 Lives"
7. "Immaterialized"
8. "Hour Glass"

== Credits ==
- Produced by Pidah
