= River City Revival =

Studio album by Alabama Thunderpussy
- Released: 1999
- Genre: Stoner metal; southern metal
- Length: 44:57
- Label: Man's Ruin Records

Alabama Thunderpussy chronology
Rise Again (1998)	River City Revival (1999)	Constellation (2000)

Professional ratings
Review scores
Source	Rating
AllMusic	3/5 stars
Rock Hard	7/10

River City Revival is the second studio album by the American heavy metal band Alabama Thunderpussy. The album was released in 1999.

== Critical reception ==
The Austin Chronicle thought that "with seven songs in just over a half hour, the crew's heavy but lyrical riffs are immersed in a raw V-8 production aesthetic, and the results weigh on your back like concentrated heat; could be a massage, could be a bruise."

AllMusic wrote: "Forceful, brutal, and blistering, River City Revival fits right in with the alternative metal climate of the late '90s—this is hardly an album that can be accused of having a lot of slickness or pop gloss."

== Track listing ==
1. "Dry Spell" - 3:28
2. "Spineless" - 4:28
3. "Heathen" - 6:52
4. "Mosquito" - 3:43
5. "Giving Up On Living" - 4:59
6. "Own Worst Enemy" - 6:11
7. "Rockin' Is Ma Business" (The Four Horsemen cover) - 3:57
8. "Heavyweight" (on Relapse Records reissue) - 3:37
9. "Rabdos" (on Relapse Records Reissue) - 4:37
10. "I Can't Feel Nothin'" (on Relapse Records reissue) - 3:05

== Personnel ==
- Johnny Throckmorton - vocals
- Erik Larson - guitar
- Asechiah "Cleetus LeRoque" Bogden - guitar
- Bill Storms - bass
- Bryan Cox - drums
