= The Split CD =

EP by Queens of the Stone Age and Beaver
- Released: September 18, 1998
- Recorded: April 1, 1998/1998
- Studios: Monkey Studios, Palm Springs, California, U.S. (tracks 1–2); Ritmo Studios, Rotterdam, Netherlands (tracks 3–4)
- Genres: Hard rock; stoner rock
- Length: 16:09
- Label: Man's Ruin
- Producers: Joe Barresi, Jacques de Haard, Beaver

Queens of the Stone Age chronology
Kyuss / Queens of the Stone Age (1997)	The Split CD (1998)	Queens of the Stone Age (1998)

Beaver chronology
The Difference Engine (1997)	The Split CD (1998)	Lodge (1999)

The Split CD (also known as Split 10" on vinyl) is a 1998 split EP featuring tracks from Queens of the Stone Age and Beaver. It is currently out of print and is considered rare.

The songs "The Bronze" and "These Aren't the Droids You're Looking For" were later included in the 2011 reissue of Queens of the Stone Age's self-titled debut album, originally released in 1998.

The songs "Morocco" and "Absence Without Leave" are misprinted, and are labeled for the opposite songs.

== Track listing ==
No.	Title	Writer(s)	Length
1.	"The Bronze"	Queens of the Stone Age	3:41
2.	"These Aren't the Droids You're Looking For"	Queens of the Stone Age	3:07
3.	"Absence Without Leave" ("Morocco" (Note: Note: Tracks 3 and 4 are switched. See official lyrics.))	Beaver	5:06
4.	"Morocco" ("Absence Without Leave")	Beaver	4:25

== Personnel ==
Queens of the Stone Age

- Josh Homme - vocals, guitar, bass (credited as "Carlo Von Sexron")
- Alfredo Hernandez - drums

Beaver

- Roel Schoenmakers - guitar, vocals
- Jozsja de Weerdt - guitar
- Milo Beenhakker - bass
- Eva Nahon - drums

Additional musicians

- Olaf Smit - additional guitar (4)

Production personnel

- Joe Barresi - engineering, production (1, 2)
- Steve Feldman - assistant engineering(1, 2)
- Jacques de Haard - production, mastering (3, 4)
- Beaver - production (3, 4)

== See also ==
- "These aren't the droids you're looking for"
