= 35007 =

Dutch rock band

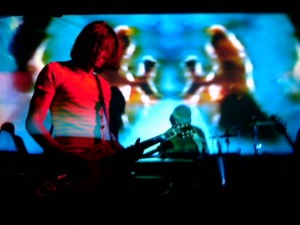
- 35007 performing live (2002, Weinheim, Germany).

Background information
- Origin: Eindhoven, Netherlands
- Genres: Stoner rock, psychedelic rock, space rock, progressive rock
- Years active: 1980–2005
- Label: Stickman
- Members: Tos Nieuwenhuizen; Sander Evers; Michel Boekhoudt
- Past members: Mark Sponselee; Jacco van Rooy; Eeuwout Baart; Bertus Fridael; Pidah Kloos; Luk Sponselee; Murphy van Oijen
- Website: Official Site

35007 is also a zip code of Alabaster, Alabama.

35007 (Loose in beghilos) were a band from the Netherlands. The sound of 35007 has been described as stoner rock, psychedelic rock, space rock and progressive rock.

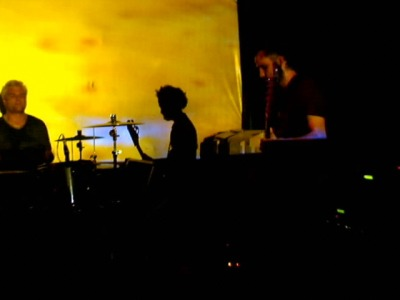
35007 live (2002, Weinheim, Germany).

== History ==
35007 was formed in Eindhoven, Netherlands at the end of the eighties, when the rhythm section of The Alabama Kids and other musicians joined forces to provide music for a fashion show by a designer named Loes. They named themselves after her (Loes is pronounced somewhat similar to "Loose"), and settled on the calculator spelling 35007 a few years later, to distinguish themselves from other bands operating under the same name. The early line-up consisted of Eeuwout Baart (vocals), Mark Sponselee (sounds, synths), Bertus Fridael (guitar), Jacco Van Rooy (drums), Michel Boekhoudt (bass guitar), Luk Sponselee (vj) and Pidah Kloos (sounds, soundengineer).

35007 released their debut album Especially for You in 1994. After the self-titled album 35007, Jacco van Rooy left the band and was replaced by Sander Evers on drums. In 2001, Eeuwout Baart also left the band and 35007 continued as an instrumental unit. Sea of Tranquillity is the first of three instrumental releases. In an album review of the 2002 release Liquid, AllMusic's Eduardo Rivadavia acknowledged the albums lasting influence stating in part that "Liquid still stands as a major accomplishment in the ambient rock field, and a recommended introduction to both 35007 and the genre at large." In 2005 the band, now with Tos Nieuwenhuizen from Beaver on guitar, released Phase V but was never seen on stage again.

Their live shows were accompanied with visual effects, such as psychedelic videos projected on stage. AllMusic also noted that they would use a "visual specialist to provide a truly multimedia and multi-sensory experience" to create "ambient trance-groove music of a predominantly instrumental design."

In the years after Phase V Bertus Fridael started his own band Mother-Unit, Sander Evers played in Gomer Pyle between 2006 and 2010, he is currently performing with the band Monomyth, Jacco van Rooy joined Motorpsycho for a short period of time and is now in the band Neon Twin, Tos Nieuwenhuizen performed live with Sunn O))), Mark and Luk Sponselee produced experimental music in Group Art Fou.

35007 performed several times at the annual international Roadburn Festival in the Netherlands, as well as the other groups in which the former members of 35007 play.

December 2012 saw a vinyl release of Phase V on Burning World records.

On the December 30, 2012, Mark Sponselee died from the effects of pneumonia.

Bassist Michel Boekhoudt died on February 18, 2022.

== Discography ==
=== Studio albums ===
- Especially for You (1994)
- 35007 (sometimes credited as 'Into the Void We Travelled') (1997)
- Liquid (2002)
- Phase V (2005)

=== Others ===
- Sea of Tranquillity EP (2001)
- Phase V Vinyl Edition (2012)
