= Right in the Nuts =

Right in the Nuts: A Tribute to Aerosmith

Compilation album by various artists
- Released: July 10, 2000
- Genre: Stoner metal
- Length: Disk 1: 1:01:51; Disk 2: 1:03:22
- Label: Small Stone

Professional ratings
Review scores
Source	Rating
AllMusic	3/5 stars

Right in the Nuts is a tribute album featuring various stoner rock/metal bands covering Aerosmith songs. The title refers to the 1979 album Night in the Ruts by Aerosmith.

== Track listing ==
Disc 1
No.	Title	Artist	Length
1.	"Movin Out"	Fireball Ministry	4:27
2.	"Make It"	Altamont	3:49
3.	"Lick and a Promise"	Scissorfight	3:35
4.	"Combination"	Atomic Bitchwax	3:44
5.	"Rock in a Hard Place (Cheshire Cat)"	Puny Human	3:44
6.	"S.O.S. (Too Bad)"	The Quill	3:51
7.	"Bright Light Fright"	Five Horse Johnson	2:37
8.	"Adam's Apple"	Honky	4:30
9.	"Draw the Line"	Voltage	3:23
10.	"Rats in the Cellar"	Speedball	3:56
11.	"Sick as a Dog"	Electric Frankenstein	4:33
12.	"Kings and Queens"	Drunk Horse	5:37
13.	"Let the Music Do the Talking"	The Want	4:08
14.	"Last Child"	Soul Clique	6:05
15.	"Train Kept A-Rollin'"	Iron Boss	2:27

Disc two
No.	Title	Artist	Length
1.	"Sweet Emotion"	Alabama Thunderpussy	5:01
2.	"Round and Round"	Half Man	6:55
3.	"Toys in the Attic"	Roadsaw	3:29
4.	"Nobody's Fault"	Solace	4:17
5.	"Remember (Walking in the Sand)"	Natas	6:11
6.	"Lightning Strikes"	The Men of Porn	9:02
7.	"Chip Away the Stone"	Gideon Smith & The Dixie Damned	3:40
8.	"Bone to Bone (Coney Island White Fish Boy)"	Raging Slab	3:17
9.	"Walkin' the Dog"	Volume	6:16
10.	"Seasons of Wither"	Nova Driver	5:15
11.	"Lord of the Thighs"	Red Giant	4:29
12.	"Soul Shaker" (cover of "Soul Saver")	Core	5:24
