= ESPN College Hoops 2K5 =

2004 basketball video game

- Developer: Visual Concepts
- Publisher: Sega
- Platforms: PlayStation 2, Xbox
- Release: November 17, 2004
- Genre: Sports
- Modes: Single player, multiplayer

ESPN College Hoops 2K5 is an American college basketball video game developed by Visual Concepts and published by Sega. It is a college basketball simulation available for the Xbox and PlayStation 2. It features former Stanford forward Josh Childress on the cover.

The game was released on November 17, 2004.

== ESPN Broadcast ==
The game features an ESPN "broadcast", where the ESPN commentators and logos are seen throughout the season, with an authentic ESPN broadcast during the game. Mike Patrick and Jay Bilas provide play-by-play and color commentary, respectively.

== Reception ==
Reception

Aggregate scores
Aggregator	Score
GameRankings	(Xbox) 86.28% (PS2) 84.98%
Metacritic	(Xbox) 86/100 (PS2) 86/100

Review scores
Publication	Score
Electronic Gaming Monthly	7.17/10
Game Informer	9/10
GamePro	4.5/5
GameSpot	8.3/10
GameZone	(Xbox) 9/10 (PS2) 8.5/10
IGN	8.8/10
Official U.S. PlayStation Magazine	3.5/5
Official Xbox Magazine (US)	8.8/10
TeamXbox	9/10
X-Play	4/5

The game was met with positive reception upon release. GameRankings and Metacritic gave it a score of 86.28% and 86 out of 100 for the Xbox version, and 84.98% and 86 out of 100 for the PlayStation 2 version.
