= Wanted Dead or Alive (EP) =

EP by Altamont
- Released: May 27, 1997
- Genre: Hard rock, heavy metal
- Label: Man's Ruin Records
- Producer: Billy Anderson

Altamont chronology
Wanted Dead or Alive (1997)	Civil War Fantasy (1998)

Professional ratings
Review scores
Source	Rating
AllMusic	3/5 stars

Wanted Dead or Alive is the debut EP by American rock band Altamont, released in 1997 through Man's Ruin Records.

== Track listing ==
1. "Pluto Washington's Introduction"
2. "Sally Greensnake"
3. "Red Jackson"
4. "Casino"
5. "Pluto Closes Shop"

== Personnel ==
- Dale Crover - Guitar, vocals
- Joey Osbourne - drums, vocals
- Dan Southwick - Bass
- Billy Anderson - Producer
- Aaron Nudelman - Organ, Engineer
- Tom Baker - Mastering
