= Beaver (band) =

Dutch band

- Also known as: 13eaver
- Origin: Amsterdam, Netherlands
- Genres: Rock, stoner rock
- Years active: 1988–2002; 2011
- Labels: Elegy, W.E.R.K./WORKS, Man's Ruin
- Past members: Roel Schoenmakers; Tos Nieuwenhuizen; Eva Nahon; Milo Beenhakker; Joszja de Weerdt; Guy Pinhas; Klaas Kuitenbrouwer
- Website: 13eaver.nl

Beaver, or 13eaver as it is better known, was a Dutch stoner rock band. All of their CDs are considered rare, and are all out of print.

== History ==
Beaver appeared on the Amsterdam music scene in the late eighties. Founded by guitarist/lyricist Roel Schoenmakers and drummer Eva Nahon, their line-up stabilized in 1992 with the addition of bass player Milo Beenhakker and ex-God guitarist Joszja de Weerdt. They started playing out on the European stages, supporting bands like The Obsessed, Rollins Band, Melvins, Fugazi, Kyuss and Queens of the Stone Age.

The results of their first three recording sessions at the Via Ritmo studio in Rotterdam were released on CD by the local W.E.R.K./WORKS label in March 1996. 'B' (13eaver) contains one hour of their heavy rocking metascience-fictional blues. The next trip to the studio yielded the Josh Homme-produced "Green", the band's contribution to the genre-defining 'Burn One Up!' compilation that came out in January 1997. The Beaver rhythm section teamed up with Josh's 'Queens of the Stone Age' for the song '18 A.D.' This record got a lot of international press and put Beaver in the vanguard of the European scene.

In September 1997 their second album, 'The Difference Engine', was released by their new label Elegy. The album was written and recorded within weeks and captures the band in particular fine form, flaunting their trademark tortured guitar-riffing, odd time signatures and extragalactic soundscapes, lyrically hunted by the heaviness of the load.

The release of the Beaver/Queens of the Stone Age split-EP on Man's Ruin Records September 1998 exposed them to a worldwide audience and drew a lot of positive reactions from fans and music press.

In 1999 Beaver toured Europe twice. After three appearances at the 'Roadburn'-fest, they hit the road in February with Eindhoven's finest 35007. September saw their second tour, this time with Spirit Caravan. In between they recorded their second Man's Ruin-release at 'The Void'-studio in Eindhoven. 'Lodge' was released in October 1999 and received 4 K's in the British 'Kerrang'.

2000 kicked in with a show at the Hollywood 'Troubadour', with Guy Pinhas on bass and Tos Nieuwenhuizen on guitar, a pre-1992 line-up as a matter of fact. While visiting the States they got the go ahead to release a full-length album. Recording started July 2000. Meanwhile, Tos had become a full band member again, replacing Joszja as lead-guitarist. The new line-up took to the road in November 2000 and toured extensively all through Europe, visiting the UK for the first time.

They went straight into the studio to finish recording what was to become 'Mobile', eight tracks that catches the band in transition from a five- to a four-piece. The release in May got overshadowed somewhat by the collapse of Man's Ruin, their record label, a month later. The band kept a low profile for the rest of the year, playing some local shows and festivals, working on new songs.

=== Reunion ===
Beaver was reunited to play the Sunn O)))-curated event at the 2011 Roadburn Festival in the Netherlands.

== Former members ==
- Roel Schoenmakers – vocals/guitar
- Eva Nahon – drums
- Klaas Kuitenbrouwer – bass
- Guy Pinhas – bass
- TOS Nieuwenhuizen – guitar
- Jozsja de Weerdt – guitar
- Milo Beenhakker – bass

== Discography ==
Studio albums

- 13eaver (1996, W•e•r•k Works)
- The Difference Engine (1997, Elegy)
- Mobile (2001, Man's Ruin)

Extended plays

- The Split CD (split with Queens of the Stone Age) (1998, Man's Ruin)
- Lodge (1999, Man's Ruin)

Compilations

- Beaver box set (2011, self-released)
