= Half Man (band) =

Swedish blues rock band

- Origin: Sweden
- Genres: Stoner rock Blues rock
- Years active: 1986–1988; 1990–2002
- Labels: Border Records; Beard of Stars
- Members: Janne Bengtsson; Peter Lilja; Patric Carlsson; Roger Bengtsson; Mats Nilsson; Gunnar Andersson

Half Man was a Swedish stoner/blues rock band.

== History ==
Half Man formed in 1986 but split after two years. The original line-up featured Janne Bengtsson on guitar and vocals, Gunnar Andersson on guitar and vocals, Patric Carlsson on bass, and Mats Nilsson on drums. The band reformed in 1990 with Bengtsson and Carlsson accompanied by guitarist Peter Lilja and drummer Roger Bengtsson. A demo was recorded in 1994 but an album was not recorded until 1998, when the band self-released The Complete Field Guide for Cynics in a limited run of 500. Border Records picked up the album and re-released it in larger quantities. The band released a split 7-inch with Mothercake in 2000 and appeared on Small Stone Records tribute to Aerosmith, Right in the Nuts. The band released their second and final album in 2002 entitled Red Herring on the Italian label Beard of Stars.

== Band members ==
- Janne Bengtsson - vocals, guitar
- Peter Lilja - guitar
- Patric Carlsson - bass
- Roger Bengtsson - drums
- Mats Nilsson - drums, backing vocals 1986–1988
- Gunnar Andersson - vocals, guitar 1986–1988

== Discography ==
=== Albums ===
- The Complete Field Guide for Cynics (1999 self-released/Border Records)
- Red Herring (2002 Beard of Stars)

=== Singles/EPs ===
- Half Man vs. Mothercake split 7-inch (2000 Self-released)

=== Compilation appearances ===
- "Home for Two" on A Fistful of Rock & Roll Vol 12 (1999 Devil Doll Records)
- "Round and Round" (Aerosmith cover) on Right in the Nuts (2000 Small Stone Records)
- "Red Herring (alternate version)" on Judge Not (2000 Underdogma Records)
- "Departed Souls" on Doom or Be Doomed (2001 Stoned Bunnies Records)
- "Nowhere Leading Road (Part I & II)" on Sacred Groove (2001 Monstruo De Gila Records)
