= Half the Man =

Half the Man may refer to:

- "Half the Man" (Clint Black song), 1994
- "Half the Man" (Jamiroquai song), 1994
- "Creep" (Stone Temple Pilots song), 1993
