= Constellation (Alabama Thunderpussy album) =

Studio album by Alabama Thunderpussy
- Released: 2000
- Recorded: August 21–31, 1999
- Genre: Stoner metal; southern metal
- Length: 64:43
- Label: Man's Ruin

Alabama Thunderpussy chronology
River City Revival (1999)	Constellation (2000)	Staring at the Divine (2002)

Professional ratings
Review scores
Source	Rating
AllMusic	3/5 stars
Kerrang!	4/5 stars
Pitchfork	2.9/10
Rock Hard	7/10

Constellation is the third studio album by American heavy metal band Alabama Thunderpussy. The album was released in 2000.

== Critical reception ==
The Austin Chronicle wrote that "thanks to the addition of acoustic guitars, piano, and organ, the tunes on Constellation are more diverse in character, more adventurous, than those on their previous, turn-up-more-with-each-listen River City Revival."

== Track listing ==
1. "Crying Out Loud" - 4:06
2. "Ambition" - 4:42
3. "1/4 Mile" - 3:07
4. "Middle Finger Salute/1271 3106" - 6:28
5. "6 Shooter" - 4:43
6. "Second Wind" - 2:29
7. "Obsari" - 3:20
8. "Foul Play" - 4:11
9. "Negligence" - 3:39
10. "15 Minute Drive'" - 5:16
11. "Burden" - 5:17
12. "Keepsake" - 5:34
13. "Country Song'" - 11:51
14. "All I Can Do Is Write About It" (Lynyrd Skynyrd cover; featured on the 2005 Relapse Records reissue)
15. "Ambition (Live)" (featured on the 2005 Relapse Records reissue)

== Personnel ==
- Johnny Throckmorton - vocals
- Erik Larson - guitar
- Asechiah "Cleetus LeRoque" Bogden - guitar
- Sam Krivanec - bass
- Bryan Cox - drums
- Nathan Brown - piano, organ
- Ralf Burkhart - backing vocals
