= Men of Porn =

American stoner rock band

- Origin: San Francisco, California, United States
- Genres: Stoner rock, sludge metal
- Years active: 1998–present
- Labels: Man's Ruin, Small Stone
- Members: Tim Moss; Dale Crover; Billy Anderson
- Past members: Shawn Hart

Men of Porn, sometimes typeset as Porn (The Men Of) and now simply known as Porn, is an American, San Francisco-based stoner rock band. They toured with Melvins on their "Double-Drumming Rock for Peace" tour at the end of 2006, and later played a set of dates during 2008 while opening for them on the 2008 Dog Tour.

== Members ==
- Tim Moss
- Dale Crover
- Billy Anderson

== Discography ==
- 1999: Porn American Style
- 2001: Experiments In Feedback
- 2004: Wine, Women And Song
- 2008: ...And The Devil Makes Three (Collaboration with Merzbow)

=== Compilations ===
- 2000: Right In The Nuts: A Tribute to Aerosmith Small Stone Records
- 2002: Sucking the 70s Small Stone Records
