= The Cowslingers =

Cowpunk band from Cleveland, Ohio

- Origin: Cleveland, Ohio
- Genre: Cowpunk
- Years active: 1991-2004
- Labels: Shake It, Rock & Roll Inc., Drink 'n' Drive
- Past members: Greg Miller, Ken Miller, Bob Latina, Leo P. Love

The Cowslingers were a Cleveland, Ohio-based cowpunk band active from 1991 to 2004. Critics such as Ed Masley have noted that the band's musical style is difficult to classify, as it includes elements of rock 'n' roll, Americana, and rockabilly. Although they have won awards as a country music band, their sound is very different from conventional American 21st-century country music; instead, it sounds more similar to the music of Merle Haggard and Johnny Cash.

== History ==
The Cowslingers were formed in 1991 when the band's singer, Greg Miller, was accepted into Kent State University.

They released their debut EP, Bad Booze Rodeo, in 1993 on Drink 'n' Drive Records, on which they also released their debut album, Off the Wagon, in 1994. Their second album, That's Truckdriving, was released later the same year. The band then became highly active touring throughout Ohio, which led to them starting to tour on the East and West Coast. Miller subsequently asked his brother, Ken Miller, to become the band's new bassist. The band released their third studio album, A Fistful of Pesetas, on the Spanish label Rock & Roll Inc. in 1996.

In 1997, the band released the album West Virginia Dog Track Boogie on Shake It Records, followed by Americana a Go Go in 1999. Also in 1999, the Cleveland Free Times named the band Best Country Act; the same paper named them the Best Punk/Hardcore Act in 2000. The band also released two studio albums in 2000: Boot 'n' Rally and Coast to Coast. In 2002, they released Bull's Eye, a compilation album of rare tracks, on Orange Recordings. The band broke up in 2004.

== Discography ==
- Bad Booze Rodeo (Drink 'n' Drive EP, 1993)
- Off the Wagon (Drink 'n' Drive, 1994)
- That's Truckdriving (Drink 'n' Drive, 1994)
- A Fistful of Pesetas (Rock & Roll Inc., 1996)
- West Virginia Dog Track Boogie (Shake It, 1997)
- Americana a Go Go (Shake It, 1999)
- Boot 'n' Rally (Shake It, 2000)
- Coast to Coast (Shake It, 2000)
- Bull's Eye (Orange Recordings compilation, 2002)
- Cowslinger Deluxe (Shake It, 2004)
