= Electric Frankenstein =

American rock band

- Origin: New Jersey, U.S.
- Genres: Garage punk (fusion genre) Garage rock, hard rock, punk rock, heavy metal
- Years active: 1991–present
- Labels: Victory, TKO, Zodiac Killer, Man's Ruin, Cargo
- Members: Sal Canzonieri; Dan Canzonieri; Trey McLamb
- Past members: Steve Miller; Mike Lincoln; Mike Mindless; Paul Perez; Rob Sefcik; Drew Banfante; Frankie Orlandoni; Jim Foster; John Caton; Joe Martin; John Steele; Bill Gill; Joel Gausten; Rene Valentine; Johnny Flude; Jaime Pina; Wheez Von Klaw
- Website: http://www.electricfrankenstein.com

Electric Frankenstein is an American garage punk revival band from New Jersey, founded by Sal Canzonieri in 1990. The band relocated to North Carolina in 2021. Their style is a mixture of punk rock, hard rock, garage rock, glam, and heavy metal. Their style is called High Energy Rock & Roll in the US and in Europe it is called Action Rock.

== History ==
Electric Frankenstein has sometimes been referred to as AC/DC meets The Dead Boys - high energy rock and roll that combines the raw and energetic sounds of punk rock with elements of hard rock played by bands like MC5 and the Stooges.

Electric Frankenstein proved to be highly influential, helping to spark a Rock revival. The band has found favor not only with the punk rock crowd but the stoner crowd as well.

The band was first formed in 1989 from the breakup of a popular NYC band called The Thing. Brothers Sal and Dan Canzonieri (a.k.a., Danny Frankenstein) continued to develop their sound between 1990 and 1991. With Sal on guitar and Dan on bass, their first line-up was with Frankie Orlandoni on vocals, Jim Foster on lead guitar and John Caton on drums. Within one year, Steve Miller took over as singer/vocalist and eventually also played lead guitar. Miller took time off while recording a side project, and Scott Wilkins of Verbal Abuse and Condemned to Death took over vocals for two years, after which Steve Miller returned on vocals and lead guitar. John Steele and Rob Sefcik took over alternately playing drums during the first 15 years. They developed a strong following in New York City and by 1995 worldwide, touring nationally and internationally. After releasing singles on a handful of independent labels, they released their first vinyl LP EF Conquers the World in 1994 and an EP, The Time Is Now, in 1995. The EP was also released on CD with added tracks from 7-inch singles as their first full-length album. Since then, they have released over 10 albums with almost every album being released on a different label. Notably, the band toured and recorded with Rik L Rik between 1996 and 1998, covering some of his songs and recording new material together. EF moved to North Carolina in 2021 and reformed with Dan and Sal (on bass and guitar), Wheez Von Klaw (on drums) from The Irving Klaws and others, and Johnny (on vocals) with Jaime Pina filling in on lead guitar (from Chemical People, 45 Grave, Christian Death, and other bands). The band has toured extensively in the USA and Europe, UK, and in Japan.

Canzonieri later created the critically acclaimed series of compilations called "A Fistful of Rock & Roll", which aimed to collect and highlight all of the best of the new rock bands, collectively known as the New Rock Revolution. There have been 13 volumes of the series so far, published on various record labels (Tee Pee Records, Victory Records, and Steel Cage Records). A second series followed known as "A Fistful More of Rock & Roll", which is ongoing, featuring over 20 volumes.

Electric Frankenstein released an art book containing their record covers and concert posters, designed by underground artists including Coop, Kozik, Johnny Ace, Art Chantry, Dirty Donny and Peter Bagge. The book was titled, Electric Frankenstein - High Energy Punk Rock & Roll Poster Art and was published by Dark Horse Books.

A second book documenting their second decade of artwork was released: Son of Electric Frankenstein - More High Energy Rock Art.

A third book illustrating EF's first 125 songs was published: Electric Frankenstein: Illustrated Lyrics (Clover Press / Yoe Books).

In 2026, High Energy Rock & Roll: Real Rock Music for Real Rock People book was published, featuring essays and artwork about Rock & Roll music and the history of High Energy Rock and how it evolved from the 1950s to now.

Forthcoming, a third EF artbook Return of Electric Frankenstein, featuring their 3rd decade of posters and record covers, and more.

=== Previous bands ===
Lead guitarist Jim Foster was an original guitarist for Adrenalin OD.

Bassist Dan Canzonieri played with The Shadow Project and Christian Death, both bands featuring original vocalist Rozz Williams.

Founding member rhythm guitarist Sal Canzonieri was in the band called The Thing from the mid-1980s into the early-1990s. The Thing were part of the early East Coast NYC Noise rock, which evolved in the later stoner rock scene (from Sonic Youth to Monster Magnet). The Thing played live shows at CBGB and the Continental, featuring strobe lights, smoke, dancers, film projection, pyrotechnics and more. Their shows later inspired White Zombie. The band grew popular in New York City and Europe, and toured the United Kingdom in 1991, where they recorded a John Peel Session for the BBC, produced by Dale Griffin (drummer from Mott the Hoople), which was released on vinyl by Dutch East India Records - Peel Sessions series.

== Members ==
=== Current ===
- Scott Wilkins (vocals)
- Jaime Pina (lead guitar)
- Sal Canzonieri (guitar)
- Dan Canzonieri (bass)
- Brad Ellington (Drums)

=== Former ===
- Steve Miller (vocals) - from Crash Street Kids, Cherry Thirteen
- Scott Wilkins (vocals) - from Verbal Abuse, Hollywood Hate, Infamous Stiffs.
- Rik L Rik (vocals) - from F-Word and Negative Trend
- Frankie Orlandoni (vocals) (first singer, before Steve Miller)
- Johnny Flude (vocals)
- Jim Foster (guitar) - from Adrenalin O.D.
- Carl Porcaro (guitar) - from Killing Time
- Chris Lynn (bass) from Hudson Falcons
- Bill Gill (bass)
- Mike Mindless Ruggerio (bass) from the Skulls
- Johnny Yeagher (bass) - from Zodiac Panthers, Ironhead, the Candy Snatchers, Thunderlip
- Sean O' Brien (bass)
- Drew Benfante (bass)
- Paul Perez (bass) from Black Novas
- Rubin Badillo (drums)
- Mike Lincoln (drums)
- John Steele (drums)
- Rob Sefcik (drums)
- Joel Gausten (drums) from Pigface
- Joey Rudacil (drums) (RIP)
- Joe Martin (drums) from Kill Your Idols
- Eric Arce (drums) from Murphy's Law
- Rene Valentine (drums) - from Joey Ramone's band, the Resistance, Hari Kari, Jim Marcus of Die Warzau, Pigface
- John Caton (drums) (first drummer)
- Jaime Pina (Lead Guitar) Chemical People
- Wheez Von Klaw (drums)
- Ed Warner (guitar)

== Discography ==
=== Albums ===
- Conquers the World (1995) Get Hip Records LP / One Foot Records CD
- Time is Now (1996) Demolition Derby Records LP / One Foot Records CD
- Sick Songs (1997) Get Hip Records LP - One Foot Records CD / Action High (UK) One Louder Records (1997), featuring Scott Wilkins of Verbal Abuse on vocals
- Spare Parts (1998) Get Hip Records, featuring Scott Wilkins of Verbal Abuse on vocals
- Rock 'n' Roll Monster (1999) Au Go Go Records (1st printing) / Deadbeat Records (2nd printing), featuring Rik L Rik of F-Word on vocals
- How to Make a Monster (1999) Victory Records
- Annie's Grave (2000) (US) Victory Records / Don't Touch Me, I'm Electric (UK) Twenty Stone Blatt Records
- The Buzz of 1000 Volts! (2001) Victory Records
- Dawn of Electric Frankenstein (2001) Triple X Records CD / Ghost Highway LP
- Listen Up Baby! (2003) Man's Ruin (1st printing) / TKO Records (2nd printing)/ Reptilian Records (3rd printing)
- We Will Bury You! (2004) TKO Records (1st printing)
- Dead & Back (2004) Tornado Records (1st printing) / Ghost Highway (2nd Printing) / DeadBeat Records (3rd printing)
- Burn Bright, Burn Fast! (2005) TKO Records (1st printing) / Little T&A Records (2nd printing) / Zodiac Killer Records (3rd printing)
- High Voltage Rock & Roll (Best of EF) (2010) Zodiac Killer Records CD / "Best of EF" (2012) No Balls Records LP
- Rockmania #1 (split w/ The Cheats) (2014) Screaming Crow Records LP
- Me No Like You Live (2021) Sonic Swirl 1999 CD / Ghost Highway Records
- Razor Blade Touch (2022) Deadbeat Records
- Holdin' Court - Live at Court Tavern NJ - Scott Wilkins of Verbal Abuse on vocals (2023) Deadbeat Records
- Supercharged (split w/ The Drippers) (2023) Deadbeat Records
- Reanimated Rock - Covers album Vol. 2 (2024) Reptilian Records LP
- Shipwrecked/Annie's Grave Revisited (2024) Boxer Face Records LP
- On the Edge (upcoming) LP (features all new EF songs)

plus various split albums & singles.
