= Frank Kozik =

American graphic artist (1962–2023)

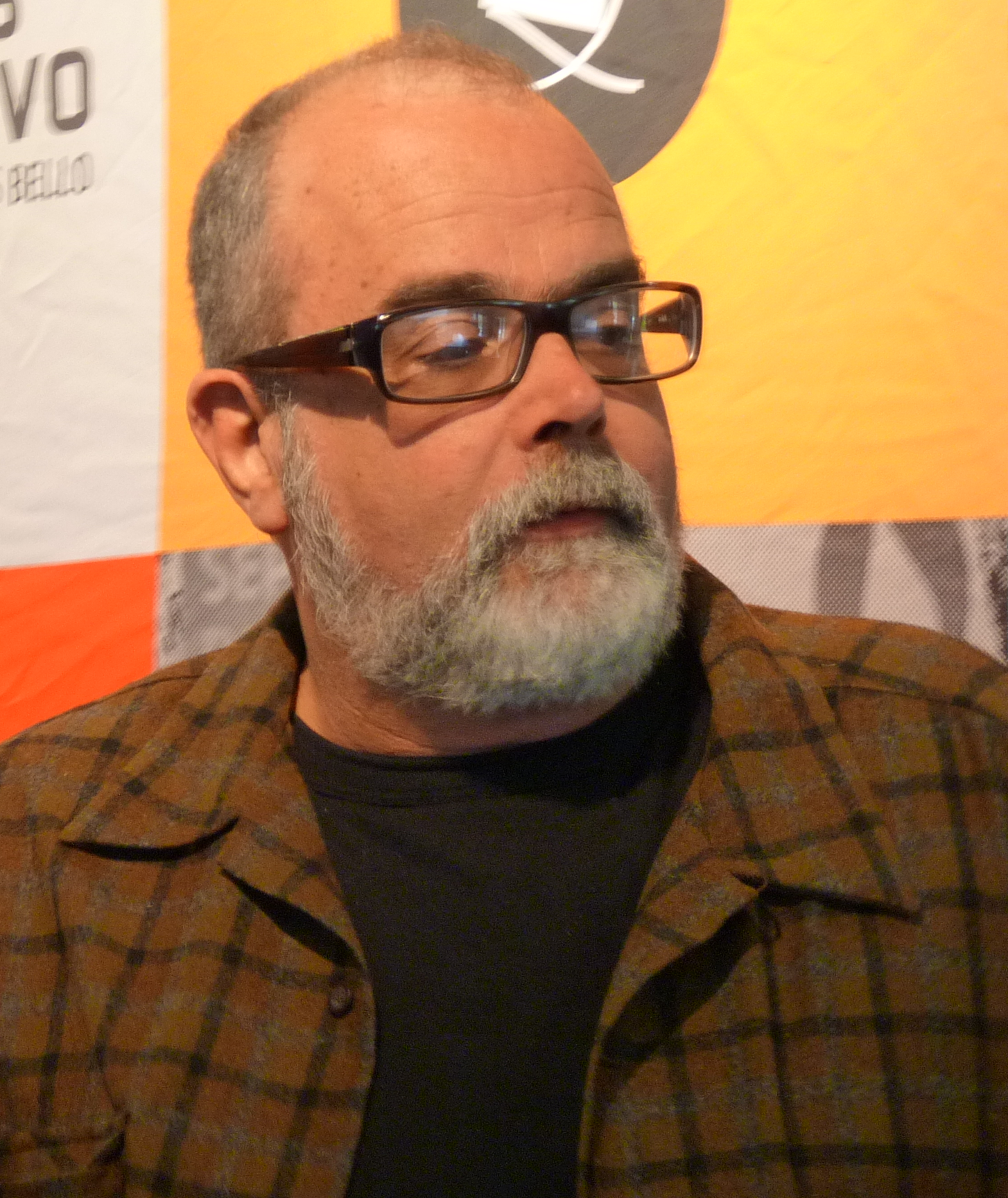
- Kozik in 2013
- Born: January 9, 1962; Torrejón de Ardoz, Madrid, Spain
- Died: May 6, 2023 (aged 61); San Francisco, California, U.S.
- Occupations: Graphic artist, toy designer
- Notable work: Labbit (designer toy)
- Movement: Stuckism
- Spouse: Sharon Kozik

Frank Kozik (January 9, 1962 – May 6, 2023) was an American graphic artist best known for his posters for alternative rock bands. With his prolific output and connections in the music industry, Kozik helped revitalize rock poster art in the late 1980s and 1990s, and was a founder of the modern art print scene. His album cover work included the bands Queens of the Stone Age and the Offspring. With his artistic versatility, he was also a pioneer in the designer toy movement, and later became the creative director of Kidrobot.

== Early life ==
Kozik was born on January 9, 1962, in Torrejón, Madrid, Spain. His father was an American serviceman and his mother was Spanish; they divorced before his birth. Kozik spent his earliest years living with his mother in Spain, where the fascist regime of Francisco Franco and its iconography would later serve as an influence in his art. In 1976, at age 15, he moved to Sacramento, California to live with his father. After dropping out of high school, he joined the U.S. Air Force at age 18 and was stationed in Austin, Texas, where he later settled.

== Career ==
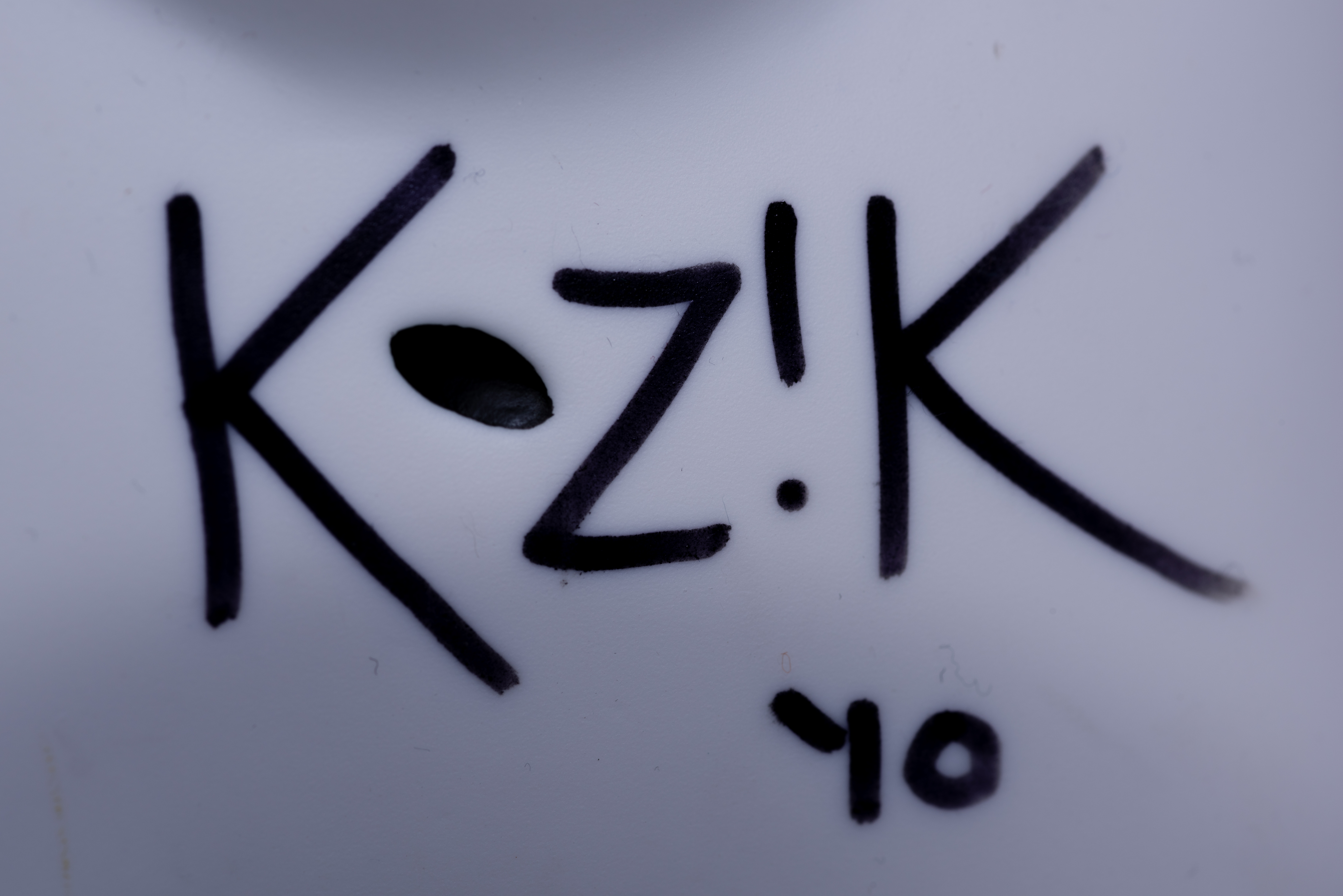
Autograph on a Labbit (KidRobot NYC signing in 2010)

=== Rock poster art ===
After leaving the Air Force, Kozik worked as a doorman at an Austin nightclub, becoming part of the city's underground-rock scene. He first gained attention as a self-trained underground artist in the early 1980s, making flyers and posters for Austin punk bands. In 1987, he won a local newspaper's "Poster of the Year" for a Butthole Surfers poster he designed, and this encouraged him to continue his work in graphic design.

In 1991, after having been given the funds to start a silkscreen press by art patrons from California, Kozik began producing silkscreen posters for local bands, which became ubiquitous at music venues and record stores in Austin. These posters caught the attention of bands that visited Austin during their tour, who in turn would commission him to produce posters for them, bringing him national fame. In December 1993, the Rolling Stone dedicated a three-page article to Kozik's work calling him the "new rock-poster genius".

According to Josh Homme of Queens of the Stone Age, getting a poster done by Kozik became a "stamp of approval" into the alternative scene. Among the bands Kozik made posters for were Green Day, Helmet, the Melvins, Nirvana, the Offspring, Pearl Jam, Queens of the Stone Age, Red Hot Chili Peppers, Soundgarden, and Stone Temple Pilots. As Kozik brought renewed interest in the poster as a medium of art, his work influenced other rock poster artists such as Emek, Chuck Sperry, and Coop. Alongside Coop, he contributed art to the magazine Answer Me!

Kozik was also a member of the Stuckism art movement.

=== Man's Ruin Records and album art ===
Kozik moved to San Francisco in 1993, where he started a print shop and founded Man's Ruin Records, an independent record label that released more than 200 records by punk and alternative bands. Man's Ruin released vinyl records and experimental music by bands to cater to the underground market, and eventually released CDs. The label allowed Kozik to experiment artistically by creating the album art for its releases. Most of the album art he produced was silkscreened and numbered in his print shop. Among the notable releases by Man's Ruin were rare tracks by the Sex Pistols from their very early days. Kozik folded the label in 2001 to focus on fine art and toy design.

The album covers designed by Kozik in his career include Queens of the Stone Age's 1998 self-titled debut and the Offspring's Americana, though the latter was released by Columbia Records. Kozik directed the music video for Soundgarden's song "Pretty Noose" and the Mint Condition video "What Kind of Man Would I Be?"

=== Smorkin' Labbit and toy design ===
As a toy designer, Kozik created the popular Smorkin' Labbit, an unshaven rabbit that smokes, inspired by the Japanese Hello Kitty character around 1996. Originally named the "Smokin' Rabbit", it was accidentally misspelled by a Japanese toy maker, and Kozik thought the new name was too good to let go. In 2003, Kidrobot began making Labbits, which would start a long-term partnership between the producer and retailer of designer toys and Kozik. Although Kozik was primarily known for his screen prints, a rare painting of the Labbit sold on the TV blind auction show Four Rooms for £4,000.

In 2007, Kozik created his own toy line, Ultraviolence, for more experimental pieces that big companies might deem too risky. In 2008, Christie's auctioned sets of multi-colored busts of Ludwig van Beethoven and Ho Chi Minh that were designed by Kozik, valued at between $3,000 and $4,000. The company acknowledged that the market for designer toys was growing.

In 2014, Kozik became creative director of Kidrobot. He helped turn the company around by working with young, urban artists to design new toys. In total, he designed over 500 toys.

=== Corporate designs ===
Kozik designed an "Absolut Kozik" print ad for Absolut Vodka. In 2007, he designed the Spike TV Video Game Awards trophy. In 2012, Kozik designed a premium, high-top shoe for Nike with an Army green exterior. He also designed a special-edition watch for Swatch, and was commissioned by Gatorade and Harley-Davidson.

=== Books ===
Kozik published several books, including Man's Ruin: Posters and Art by Frank Kozik and Desperate Measures Empty Pleasures.

== Death ==
Kozik died by suicide in San Francisco on May 6, 2023, at age 61. He is survived by his wife Sharon.

== Legacy ==
Kozik's influence on various fields of art, particularly rock poster art and toy design, has been immense. Austin Chronicle writer Tim Stegall has described Kozik as "the graphic and aesthetic conscience of our generation". Artist Shepard Fairey, quoted in The New York Times, referred to Kozik as "the punk rock Warhol". Fairey added: "Even his most famous character, Labbit, it might look cute, but it's about subverting culture. Kozik saw his work as a Trojan Horse to grab people's attention before reminding them that all is not perfect in paradise". Artist Ron English was quoted as saying in the same article: "[Kozik]'s the guy who was always there first [...] He's the guy who paved the highway so a KAWS could run down it".

Regarding Kozik's untimely death, the artist Emek wrote on Facebook: "RIP to a true giant of the scene- art, cars, toys, sculptures, underground art, music, rock posters, album covers, record labels, music videos… he did it all, he influenced all, larger-than-life yet down-to-earth hero to many. Legend".

== Bibliography ==
- Man's Ruin: The Posters & Art of Frank Kozik (Last Gasp, 1995)
- An Ode to Joy: Posters, Prints and Other Work of Frank Kozik (Last Gasp, 1999)
- Desperate Measures: Posters Prints and More (Last Gasp, 2002)
- Plasticland (Dark Horse Comics, 2007)

== See also ==
- Stuckism
- Lowbrow (art movement)
