= Murder of Gary Lauwers =

1984 murder of a 17-year-old boy

- Date: June 19, 1984
- Location: Northport, New York, U.S.
- Type: Stabbing
- Outcome: Kasso died by suicide in jail Troiano acquitted of second-degree murder
- Deaths: Gary Lauwers
- Arrests: Ricky Kasso; Jimmy Troiano
- Convictions: None

On June 19, 1984, 17-year old Gary Lauwers was murdered in Northport, New York, by his friend, Richard Allan Kasso Jr. Two other teenagers, Jimmy Troiano and Albert Quiñones, were present at the murder, which took place in the Aztakea Woods of Northport; all four were under the influence of what they believed to be mescaline, but was most likely LSD.

The murder became a sensational news story due to the alleged torture of Lauwers and supposed occult aspects of the murder. The murder took place during a period known as the "Satanic panic", when there was much public concern over the effects of Satanic and occult content in heavy metal music and in role-playing games. Kasso was wearing an AC/DC T-shirt at the time of his arrest and was a fan of groups such as Black Sabbath and Judas Priest.

== Perpetrator ==
Richard Allan Kasso Jr. (March 29, 1967 – July 7, 1984), also known as the Acid King, was the son of a local high school history teacher and football coach at affluent Cold Spring Harbor High School. He was often thrown out of his home as a young teenager and lived on the streets of Northport, New York. He usually slept in the local woods or in the cars, garages, backyards and houses of friends. Kasso often took drugs, mainly marijuana, hashish, LSD, PCP and purple "microdots" of what he believed to be mescaline but was most likely low-grade LSD. He tended to save all of his drugs for his own use but had on occasion dealt drugs in Northport as well.

Kasso was acquainted with the members of a loosely organized group of friends who sold marijuana; they referred to themselves as the "Knights of the Black Circle." After the murder, several newspapers and television journalists incorrectly reported the Knights as being a "satanic cult." Kasso allegedly participated in occult ceremonies, mostly in Northport, and celebrated Walpurgis Night at the infamous Amityville Horror house in 1984. He also expressed to friends his interest in Anton LaVey's book The Satanic Bible. On at least one occasion, Kasso's parents admitted him to the South Oaks Psychiatric Hospital (formerly known as Amityville Asylum) in Amityville for drug rehabilitation and psychiatric care.

In the year prior to the murder, Kasso had been arrested for digging into a colonial-era grave inside a local cemetery. Less than a month after his arrest for this crime, he contracted pneumonia and was treated at Long Island Jewish Hospital. During his hospital stay, Kasso's parents tried to convince doctors to commit him for involuntary psychiatric care. However, the conclusion of the psychiatrists was that Kasso exhibited antisocial behavior but was neither psychotic nor a violent danger, and he was released upon recovering from his bout with pneumonia.

== Murder of Gary Lauwers ==
The conflict between Kasso and Gary Lauwers had started some time earlier, when Lauwers stole ten bags of PCP from Kasso's jacket after the latter had passed out at a party. Kasso confronted him soon after the incident, prompting Lauwers to immediately return five of the ten bags. Lauwers also promised to repay Kasso $50 for the five bags of PCP that had been used. Kasso reportedly beat Lauwers on four occasions. On the night of the murder, he visited the small gazebo in Cow Harbor Park and borrowed a radio from a friend. He then invited Lauwers to get high with him, Jimmy Troiano and Albert Quiñones. The group walked to Aztakea Woods, set up camp and ingested several doses, or "hits", of what they believed to be mescaline. The drugs they ingested were tablets called "purple microdots", and while they were erroneously referred to as mescaline on the street, they were likely LSD. The teens also smoked several bags of PCP before attempting to start a small fire, but all of the available firewood was too wet and would not ignite. Lauwers used his socks, as well as the sleeves from his denim jacket, as kindling to start the fire.

At some point during the night, the situation escalated into violence. Kasso scuffled with Lauwers, bit him on the neck and stabbed him in the chest. Kasso continued his assault on Lauwers, Quiñones initially claimed that Troiano helped Kasso and held Lauwers during the attack. During subsequent testimony, provided under immunity, Quiñones claimed that Troiano did not assist Kasso. Lauwers was stabbed somewhere between 17 and 36 times and his eyeballs were possibly sliced out during the stabbing. During the attack, Kasso allegedly commanded Lauwers to "Say you love Satan", and Lauwers is said to have instead replied "I love my mother," before finally giving in to Kasso's demands. After the attack, Kasso and Troiano covered Lauwers' body with leaves and small branches and left it in the woods.

The date of the murder was initially misreported by the police and press as June 16, 1984. In 2018, it was revealed that the murder had actually taken place three days later on June 19.

== Aftermath and death ==
In the aftermath, Kasso bragged about the murder to friends. Kasso claimed Satan manifested in the form of a black crow after killing Lauwers, and that the crow had cawed, something he interpreted as Satan's approval of the murder. Kasso even brought several disbelieving teens to view Lauwers' body before he and Troiano returned to the woods to bury the decomposing remains in a shallow grave. However, it wasn't until two weeks went by, on July 1, that the murder was reported to the police via an anonymous tip. On July 4, 1984, police used dogs to search Aztakea Woods and recovered the decomposing and mutilated body of Gary Lauwers. Kasso and Troiano were arrested the next day. On July 7, Kasso died by suicide, hanging himself in his jail cell.

Jimmy Troiano signed two confessions that he later recanted. Quiñones gave witness account that Troiano helped Kasso during the murder, but later denied this during his testimony at Troiano's trial. Due to Quiñones' drugged state at the time of the killing, his testimony was brought into question and Troiano was acquitted of second-degree murder in a trial by jury in April 1985.

== In popular culture ==
Books

- Say You Love Satan (published October 1, 1987 by Dell Books; ISBN 0-440-17574-7) by David St. Clair, a heavily fictionalized telling of the events that is no longer in print. For his book, St. Clair plagiarized several portions of "Kids in the Dark", an article by David Breskin for Rolling Stone, and Breskin considered legal action. Literary critic and journalist Phil Jenkins of the Ottawa Citizen called it "trash", "lowbrow", and "junk" in his review.
- The Acid King (published October 16, 2018 by Simon & Schuster; ISBN 1-481-48228-9) by Jesse P. Pollack, a nonfiction account of Kasso's life and his murder of Lauwers, containing interviews with his friends, family, and the investigators who worked the case.

Documentaries

- The Devil Worshippers (1985, TV), episode of ABC news program 20/20, featuring the Lauwers murder.
- Devil Worship: Exposing Satan's Underground (1988, TV), prime-time episode of Geraldo narrated by Geraldo Rivera, also featuring the Lauwers murder.
- Killer Kids (2012, TV), episode "Occult Killers", directed by Jean Leclerc for The Biography Channel, featuring the Lauwers murder.
- The Acid King (2021, film), directed by Jesse P. Pollack and Dan Jones, based on Pollack's 2018 Simon & Schuster book of the same name. The film was released to worldwide hard media and streaming platforms by Wide Eye Releasing in 2021.

Films

- Black Circle Boys (1997), directed by Matthew Carnahan. It was inspired by the events in Northport. "Shane Carver", the character very loosely based on Kasso, is played by Eric Mabius.
- Ricky 6 (2000), also known as Ricky Six, Ricky 666 and Say You Love Satan, directed by Peter Filardi. "Ricky Cowen", the character based on Kasso, is portrayed by Vincent Kartheiser. Winner of the Audience Prize at the Fantasia Film Festival, it has never been officially released.
- My Sweet Satan (1994), directed by Jim Van Bebber, a loose retelling of the murder in Northport starring Van Bebber as "Ricky Kasslin", the character based on Kasso.

Albums and songs

- "Sudden Impact!" (1985, This Is Big Audio Dynamite) by Big Audio Dynamite
- "Satan Is Boring" (1985, Bad Moon Rising) by Sonic Youth
- "0-0 (Where Evil Dwells)" (1987, Dirtdish) by Wiseblood. Covered by Fear Factory on their 1998 album Obsolete.
- "Bad Party" (1988, Beelzebubba) by the Dead Milkmen
- "Cryin' Shame" (1989, Wake Me When It's Over) by Faster Pussycat
- "Psychedelic Sacrifice" (1993, Burn, Baby, Burn!) by the Electric Hellfire Club
- "True Believer" (1999. The Gathering) by Testament
- "Teenage Dirtbag" (2000, Wheatus) by Wheatus
- "Catacomb Kids" (2007, None Shall Pass) by Aesop Rock
- "From Listening to Lightning" (2009, The Lightning EP) by Wheatus
- "Cat's Cradle" (2010, TV, Death And The Devil) by Nü Sensae
- "Severed Heads of State" (2012, The Grimy Awards) by Ill Bill
- Time to Die (2014) by Electric Wizard
- "Acid King" (2018, Malibu Ken) by Malibu Ken (Aesop Rock and Tobacco)

Bands

- Acid King is a Stoner Metal band formed in California in 1993 by frontwoman Lori S., drummer Joey Osbourne and bassist Peter Lucas. The band’s name was inspired by the crimes of Ricky Kasso
