= Man's Ruin Records =

American independent record label

- Founded: 1994
- Founder: Frank Kozik
- Defunct: 2001
- Status: Defunct
- Country of origin: United States
- Location: San Francisco, California

Man's Ruin Records was an independent record label owned and founded by San Francisco Bay Area artist Frank Kozik. In total, the record label released over 200 singles and albums, with most of the artwork designed by Kozik.

After the 1995 release of Man's Ruin's first record, Experimental Audio Research (EAR): Delta 6, Kozik worked with artists whom he wanted to release. He also designed all of the sleeve-art for the releases. The catalog of Man's Ruin is vast, including relatively famous bands such as the Hellacopters, Nebula, Kyuss, High on Fire, Entombed, Turbonegro, 13eaver, Queens of the Stone Age, Electric Wizard, and the Sex Pistols; and also lesser known bands such as FuckEmos, Soulpreacher, Angel Rot, Orange Goblin and the Cowslingers. The last record released was from Begotten. The label was officially closed by 2002. The label's slogan was "Empty Pleasures and Desperate Measures since 1994".

== Operations ==
Man's Ruin aimed to prioritize the needs and interests of artists. Recordings were licensed for a time period of two to five years, and all copyrights and publishing liberties were retained by the bands. Profits on releases were split 50-50 between band and label. The posters and album art spanning Kozik's career, including from the Man's Ruin era, are still very coveted. The limited print vinyl have been rising in value due to two factors: the majority of covers were screen-printed and numbered by Kozik, and most records were released in editions of 5,000 copies or less. Among the most sought-after records from the Man's Ruin catalog are the Desert Sessions compilations, a brainchild of Kozik, which were released in highly limited editions on clear and colored vinyl. The CD versions of the first six volumes, as well as the rest of the entire Man's Ruin catalog, have gone out of print with the demise of the label. Subsequent volumes of The Desert Sessions were released on Josh Homme's Rekords Rekords.

Man's Ruin specialized in producing and releasing limited edition 10" EP records. Often an album would be released in several different sets, such as the first release from Queens of the Stone Age in 1998, which was released on Man's Ruin in three editions: 2,500 black, 300 green, and 200 orange/yellow. A subsequent pressing of 198 copies on blue vinyl was made independently by the band as a "tour edition". The vast majority of records released on the label were colored.

The label was distributed in the US and UK by Mordam Records, and then a brief and unsuccessful switch was made to RED Distribution, resulting in the demise of the label after a series of problems. Internationally, Man's Ruin distributed its own music for the most part, though the label also worked with Swedish distributor and record label House of Kicks. Unlike most releases in music today, the international releases from Man's Ruin did not differ from the domestic American releases. However, it was not uncommon for the cover of a vinyl release to differ from that of the CD edition of the release.

As a print shop, Man's Ruin printed its own art as well as posters for other artists such as Coop.

== Decline and fall ==
The label became defunct after a series of distribution changes and problems involving the label having outgrown its original distributor. Man's Ruin also lost its lease at the height of the Bay Area dot-com boom and was shut down for a period of several months while attempting to relocate its offices. This combination led to its demise at the end of 2001. The label's website was shut down a few months later. Internet users who wished to view the Man's Ruin website were simply greeted with the message: "sorry mansruin never paid their bill and their site is no longer here". All operations ended and licenses were returned to the various copyright holders in 2002.

After closing Man's Ruin, Kozik dedicated himself to fine art, design, and the burgeoning toy art industry.

Several bands that worked with Man's Ruin, including Fu Manchu, Turbonegro, Acid King, and the Hellacopters, have re-released the albums they recorded with the label, either independently or on other record labels.

== See also ==
- List of record labels
- Man's Ruin Records discography
