= Volume 5: Poetry for the Masses (SeaShedShitheadByTheSheSore) =

EP by The Desert Sessions
- Released: July 21, 1999
- Recorded: March 11–14, 1999
- Studios: Rancho De La Luna, Joshua Tree, California
- Genres: Desert rock, stoner rock, alternative rock, experimental rock
- Length: 17:16
- Label: Man's Ruin

The Desert Sessions chronology
Volume 4: Hard Walls and Little Trips (1998)	Volume 5: Poetry for the Masses (SeaShedShitheadByTheSheSore) (1999)	Volume 6: Black Anvil Ego (1999)

Volume 5: Poetry for the Masses (SeaShedShitheadByTheSheSore) is the fifth extended play (EP) by American desert rock collective The Desert Sessions. Recorded in March 1999 at Rancho De La Luna, it was released by Man's Ruin Records on July 21, 1999. The album features eleven credited musicians, including Josh Homme, Dave Catching and Gene Trautmann. It was later re-released with Volume 6: Black Anvil Ego as Volumes 5 & 6.

== Recording and release ==
The fifth Desert Sessions EP was recorded in sessions between March 11 and 14, 1999 at Rancho De La Luna in Joshua Tree, California, a studio founded by Fred Drake and Dave Catching. The tracks on Volume 5 were engineered by Steve Feldman, with Tony Mason assisting, and features a total of eleven credited musicians: Josh Homme (bass, guitar and keyboards), Catching (guitars and piano), Blag Dahlia, Mario Lalli, Nick Oliveri (all vocals), Gene Trautmann, Brant Bjork, Drake, Adam Maples, Mathias Schneeberger (all drums), Mason (guitar and bass) and Teddy Quinn. Homme mixed the album, and it was mastered by Dave Schultz at DigiPrep in Hollywood, Los Angeles, California.

Volume 5 was initially released alone on vinyl by Man's Ruin Records on July 21, 1999. It later received a re-release with its follow-up, Volume 6: Black Anvil Ego, on CD on September 14, 1999, as Volumes 5 & 6.

== Critical reception ==
Professional ratings
Review scores
Source	Rating
AllMusic	3/5 stars

Music website AllMusic awarded Volume 5: Poetry for the Masses (SeaShedShitheadByTheSheSore) three out of five stars.

== Track listing ==
Side A
No.	Title	Length
1.	"You Think I Ain't Worth a Dollar, But I Feel Like a Millionaire"	2:54
2.	"Letters to Mommy"	3:43
3.	"I'm Dead"	1:38
Total length:		8:12

Side B
No.	Title	Length
4.	"Punk Rock Caveman Living in a Prehistoric Age"	3:28
5.	"Goin to a Hangin"	5:33
Total length:		9:01

== Personnel ==
Personnel credits adapted from album liner notes.

Musicians

- Josh Homme – bass (tracks 1, 3 and 4), guitar (track 1), keyboards (track 2), mixing
- Dave Catching – guitars (tracks 3, 4 and 5), piano (track 2)
- Blag Dahlia – vocals (tracks 2 and 4)
- Gene Trautmann – drums (tracks 3 and 4)
- Mario Lalli – vocals (track 1)
- Brant Bjork – drums (track 1)
- Fred Drake – drums (track 2)
- Nick Oliveri – vocals (track 3)
- Adam Maples – drums (track 4)
- Tony Mason – guitar and bass (track 5), engineering assistance
- Mathias Schneeberger – drums (track 5)
- Teddy Quinn – vocals (track 5)

Production

- Steve Feldman – engineering
- Dave Schultz – mastering

Artwork

- Frank Kozik – designed album cover and sleeve
