= Volume 6: Black Anvil Ego =

EP by The Desert Sessions
- Released: August 16, 1999
- Recorded: March 11–14, 1999
- Studios: Rancho De La Luna, Joshua Tree, California
- Genres: Desert rock, stoner rock, alternative rock, experimental rock
- Length: 20:05
- Label: Man's Ruin

The Desert Sessions chronology
Volume 5: Poetry for the Masses (SeaShedShithead; ByTheSheSore) (1999)	Volume 6: Black Anvil Ego (1999)	Volume 7: Gypsy Marches (2001)

Volume 6: Black Anvil Ego is the sixth extended play (EP) by American desert rock collective The Desert Sessions. Recorded in March 1999 at Rancho De La Luna, it was released by Man's Ruin Records on August 16, 1999. The album features eleven credited musicians, including Josh Homme, Dave Catching and Gene Trautmann. It was later re-released with Volume 5: Poetry for the Masses (SeaShedShitheadByTheSheSore) as Volumes 5 & 6.

== Recording and release ==
The sixth Desert Sessions EP was recorded in sessions between March 11 and 14, 1999 at Rancho De La Luna in Joshua Tree, California, a studio founded by Fred Drake and Dave Catching. The tracks on Volume 6 were engineered by Steve Feldman, with Tony Mason assisting, and feature a total of eleven credited musicians: Josh Homme (guitars, vocals, bass, drums and percussion), Brant Bjork, Catching (both guitar), Gene Trautmann (drums and percussion), Fugitive Pope (vocals, guitar and electronics), Digital D (vocals and guitar), Chizm (vocals and bass), Drake (percussion), Van Conner, Hosh Ross Sonjoni (both bass), Barrett Martin and Adam Maples (both drums). Homme mixed the album, and it was mastered by Dave Schultz at DigiPrep in Hollywood, Los Angeles, California.

Volume 6 was initially released alone on vinyl by Man's Ruin Records on August 16, 1999. It later received a re-release with its predecessor, Volume 5: Poetry for the Masses (SeaShedShitheadByTheSheSore), on CD on September 14, 1999, as Volumes 5 & 6.

== Critical reception ==
Professional ratings
Review scores
Source	Rating
AllMusic	3/5 stars

Music website AllMusic awarded Volume 6: Black Anvil Ego three out of five stars.

== Track listing ==
Side A
No.	Title	Length
1.	"A#1"	3:38
2.	"Like a Drug"	2:24
3.	"Take Me to Your Leader" (performed by Aliens)	4:40
Total length:		10:43

Side B
No.	Title	Length
4.	"Teens of Thailand"	5:38
5.	"Rickshaw"	3:45
Total length:		9:24

== Personnel ==
Personnel credits adapted from album liner notes.

Musicians

- Josh Homme – guitars (tracks 1, 2, 4 and 5), vocals (tracks 1, 2 and 5), bass and drums (tracks 1 and 2), percussion (track 3), mixing
- Brant Bjork – guitar (tracks 1 and 2)
- Gene Trautmann – percussion (track 3), drums (track 5)
- Fugitive Pope – vocals, guitar and electronics (track 3)
- Digital D – vocals and guitar (track 3)
- Chizm – vocals and bass (track 3)
- The Saucers - background vocals (track 3)
- Fred Drake – percussion (track 3)
- Dave Catching – guitar (track 4)
- The Kid – bass (track 4)
- Barrett Martin – drums (track 4)
- Hosh Ross Sonjoni – bass (track 5)
- Adam Maples – drums (track 5)

Production

- Steve Feldman – engineering
- Tony Mason – engineering assistance
- David Schultz – mastering

Artwork

- Frank Kozik – designed album artwork
