= Volumes 7 & 8 =

Desert Sessions 7 & 8

Compilation album by The Desert Sessions
- Released: October 16, 2001
- Studio: Rancho De La Luna, Joshua Tree, CA
- Genre: Desert rock
- Length: 39:25
- Label: Southern Lord (SUNN12), Rekords Rekords

The Desert Sessions chronology
Volumes 5 & 6 (1999)	Desert Sessions 7 & 8 (2001)	Volumes 9 & 10 (2003)

Professional ratings
Review scores
Source	Rating
AllMusic	4.5/5 stars
Rock Sound	4/5 stars

Volumes 7 & 8 is a compilation of the seventh and eighth releases from The Desert Sessions. The seventh volume is titled Gypsy Marches, and the eighth Can You See Under My Thumb? There You Are.. The album features appearances from Mark Lanegan, Alain Johannes, Natasha Shneider, Chris Goss, Brendon McNichol, Fred Drake, Nick Eldorado, and Joshua Homme.

== Track listing ==
No.	Title	Length
1.	"Don't Drink Poison"	5:02
2.	"Hanging Tree"	3:13
3.	"Winners"	1:06
4.	"Polly Wants a Crack Rock"	2:29
5.	"Up in Hell"	4:46
6.	"Nenada"	3:10
7.	"The Idiots Guide"	3:04
8.	"Interpretive Reading"	1:36
9.	"Covousier"	1:50
10.	"Cold Sore Superstars"	3:24
11.	"Making a Cross"	5:31
12.	"Ending"	1:29
13.	"Piano Bench Breaks"	2:45

== Notes ==
- Queens of the Stone Age re-recorded "Hanging Tree" for their 2002 album Songs for the Deaf.
- The track "Interpretive Reading" is a mostly verbatim excerpt of the children's book A Ghost Named Fred. The reading is set to a background of musical improvisation and a chorus from Indio High School singing their school's alma mater song.
- The main riff in the track "Cold Sore Superstars" was used in the song "No One Knows".
- "Polly Wants a Crack Rock" is a precursor to the Eagles of Death Metal song "I Only Want You".
- In the song "Winners" the names were those of real Indio High School students who were winners of the Fifth Annual Coachella Valley Science Fair in the 1960s. Many of these students were from the Class of 1965.
- The tracks "Ending" and "Piano Bench Breaks" were not present the vinyl versions. "Piano Bench Breaks" features a hidden track which advertises upcoming releases.

== Personnel ==
- Joshua Homme: Vocals, piano, drums, marxophone, bass, backing vocals, gong, guitar, clap, harmony vocals, production
- Samantha Maloney: Vocals, drums, bass, cymbals, slide bass
- Brendon McNichol: Mandolin, drum, percussion, bass, guitar, tambora, balalaika
- Chris Goss: Vocals, bass, guitar, clap
- Fred Drake: Drums, Crumar, backing vocals, marxophone, harmony vocals, everything
- Mark Lanegan: Vocals
- Alain Johannes: Guitars, harmony vocals, Tuvan drone, clavinet, backing vocals, saxophone, udu, harmonium, cig fiddle, vocals, mixing
- Nick ElDorado: Vocals, tension
- Natasha Shneider: Vocals, foreign vocals, bass keys, Rhodes, stuff
- Tony Mason: Engineering
