= The Desert Sessions =

Musical collective

- Origin: Palm Desert, California, U.S.
- Genres: Desert rock; stoner rock; psychedelic rock; alternative rock; experimental rock
- Years active: 1997–2004; 2018–present
- Labels: Matador; Rekords; Man's Ruin; Southern Lord; Ipecac
- Website: www.desertsessions.com

The Desert Sessions are a musical collective series, founded by Josh Homme in 1997. Artists such as Brant Bjork, PJ Harvey, Twiggy Ramirez, Dave Catching, Nick Oliveri, Mark Lanegan, John McBain, Ben Shepherd, Josh Freese, Chris Goss, Alain Johannes, Troy Van Leeuwen, Dean Ween, Les Claypool and many others from the Palm Desert Scene have contributed as songwriters and musicians.

== History ==
=== Background ===
The Desert Sessions began in August 1997 at the Rancho De La Luna in Joshua Tree when Josh Homme brought together musicians from the bands Monster Magnet, Goatsnake, earthlings?, and Kyuss. The ranch, located in the Mojave Desert, has an old house filled with rare and unique recording equipment and instruments, and is owned by Dave Catching and the late Fred Drake. With the large numbers of musicians arriving to the ranch over time, and with many albums having been produced there, the setting has been described as creating a unique "desert sound" comparable to the grunge rock of Seattle in the early 1990s and the acid rock of San Francisco in the 1960s.

The first Desert Session was not actually a "session" per se, but Homme and his band at the time (The Acquitted Felons) playing for three days straight on psychedelic mushrooms. Since then, the Desert Sessions have become legendary, growing in intensity and artistic merit. Homme said:

At Desert Sessions, you play for the sake of music. That's why it's good for musicians. If someday that's not enough anymore, or that's not the reason behind you doing it—that's not your raison d'être—then a quick reminder like Desert Sessions can do so much for you, it's amazing. It's easy to forget that this all starts from playing in your garage and loving it.

=== Improvisational atmosphere ===
Desert Sessions songs are written "on the spot," often in a matter of hours. Many stories have sprung from the improvisational atmosphere of the ranch. For example, the song "Creosote" from Volumes 9 & 10 was written by Dean Ween and Alain Johannes on the ranch's front porch within four minutes of meeting each other. Similarly, Chris Goss and PJ Harvey wrote the song "There Will Never Be A Better Time" for I See You Hearin' Me after going out onto the porch of the ranch for four minutes with an acoustic guitar; they re-entered the house and recorded the song in one take, the only time the song was ever played by the collective.

=== Homme on project delays ===
In a 2007 interview with Rockline, Homme stated that he was going to be working on a new Desert Sessions album in December 2007, and the first ten will be re-released as a box set. Homme also stated:

There's nothing going on [now]. I wish, but I've run out of time. I'm talking to this one guy about adding four more hours to each day, but he's not real positive about it. Those are never going to end, because there's no reason for them to end. But I'd like to make them more regular. – Josh Homme interview with Billboard.com, April 13, 2007

The Desert Sessions are gonna go on forever. There's no reason to stop them. No, it wasn't me that said there would be only 12 volumes—I'm gonna do 112! It's just a mix tape—the longest-running mix tape in existence. It's awesome: doing them is just a matter of making the time frame come together. I was really wanting to do one before the new album "Era Vulgaris" came out, but we didn't put a time frame on it and it consumed what would have been that time. I didn't want it to take away from what we were doing. – Josh Homme in May 2007 as recorded by Blabbermouth.net.

After 11 years of inactivity, Homme revealed in October 2014 that he would start working on more Desert Sessions material the following year. Homme added:

"Because Desert Sessions works best at a certain time of the year, when everything slows and everyone takes a deep breath out. At the end of the year, in that December-January timeframe, everyone has exhaled. And post-exhale is the time to do something like that. So if I miss that window… I miss that window".

=== Desert Sessions Volumes 11 & 12 ===
Homme remained silent about the project until May 2019, when he posted an image on Instagram with the hashtags "#Desert, #Sessions, #11, #12".

In September 2019, Desert Sessions Volumes 11 & 12 were officially announced, along with a comedic promo video featuring Homme and Liam Lynch. The promo includes Homme running through some of the featured artists such as Billy Gibbons, Les Claypool, and Jake Shears.

In October 2019, recordings of the Desert Sessions were released for the first time in sixteen years.

=== Live performances ===
The Desert Sessions have only performed live twice. The live performances, which included Joey Castillo, Troy Van Leeuwen, Brian O'Connor, and Homme, as well as a variety of musicians performing different songs, were performed on an episode of the British music television show Later... with Jools Holland, as well as the Coachella Valley Music and Arts Festival in 2004.

The updated Desert Sessions website featured a "World Tour" page coincident with the release of Vol. 11/12 but no dates were ever added. Whether this indicates possible intent to tour the material at the time is unknown.

=== Streaming issues ===
Due to licensing issues involving Man's Ruin, none of the official Desert sessions recordings were available on streaming services until as late as March 23, 2019, when Volumes 9 & 10 were added (excluding bonus tracks such as Shepherd's Pie), to help boost demand for the release of Volumes 11 & 12 later that year.

== Awards ==
The art directors for Desert Sessions Volumes 11 & 12, Doug Cunningham and Jason Noto, won the Grammy Award for Best Recording Package at the 2021 Grammy Awards.

== Discography ==
Volumes 1-6 were released as individual LPs and were eventually re-released as compilation albums in pairs. Volumes 7 and onward were never released as LPs, but rather as compilation albums only.

=== Man's Ruin volumes ===
Volume	Name	Release Date	Compilation Album	Compilation Release Date
1	Instrumental Driving Music for Felons	November 18, 1997	Volumes 1 & 2	February 24, 1998
2	Status: Ships Commander Butchered	February 10, 1998	Volumes 1 & 2	February 24, 1998
3	Set Coordinates for the White Dwarf!!!	May 12, 1998	Volumes 3 & 4	October 23, 1998
4	Hard Walls and Little Trips	September 22, 1998	Volumes 3 & 4	October 23, 1998
5	Poetry for the Masses (SeaShedShitheadByTheSheSore)	July 21, 1999	Volumes 5 & 6	September 10, 1999
6	Black Anvil Ego	August 16, 1999	Volumes 5 & 6	September 10, 1999

=== Rekords Rekords volumes ===
Volume	Name	Compilation Album	Release Date
7	Gypsy Marches	Volumes 7 & 8	October 16, 2001
8	Can You See Under My Thumb? There You Are.	Volumes 7 & 8	October 16, 2001
9	I See You Hearin' Me	Volumes 9 & 10	September 23, 2003
10	I Heart Disco	Volumes 9 & 10	September 23, 2003

=== Matador volumes ===
Volume	Name	Compilation Album	Release Date
11	Arrividerci Despair	Volumes 11 & 12	October 25, 2019
12	Tightwads & Nitwits & Critics & Heels	Volumes 11 & 12	October 25, 2019

== Collaborating artists ==
Member	Associated acts	1 & 2	3 & 4	5 & 6	7 & 8	9 & 10	11 & 12
Josh Homme (Note: Credited as "Töôrnst Hülpft" on track 2 of Volume 12)	Queens of the Stone Age, Kyuss, Eagles of Death Metal, Screaming Trees, Them Crooked Vultures, Masters of Reality	X	X	X	X	X	X
Fred Drake	earthlings?, Ministry of Fools	X	X	X	X		
Dave Catching	Queens of the Stone Age, earthlings?, Mondo Generator, Eagles of Death Metal, Yellow#5, Masters of Reality, Ringling Sisters, Tex and the Horseheads, Goon Moon, Peaches	X	X	X		X	X
Brant Bjork	Kyuss, Fu Manchu, Brant Bjork & The Bros, Fatso Jetson, Mondo Generator, Yellow #5, Vista Chino, Stöner	X		X			
Alfredo Hernández	Kyuss, Queens of the Stone Age, Orquesta del Desierto, Yawning Man, Across the River	X	X				
Pete Stahl	Scream, Wool, Goatsnake, earthlings?, Orquesta del Desierto	X	X				
Ben Shepherd	Soundgarden, Hater, Wellwater Conspiracy	X	X				
John McBain	Monster Magnet, Hater, Wellwater Conspiracy	X	X				
Nick Oliveri	Kyuss, Queens of the Stone Age, Dwarves, Mondo Generator, Vista Chino, Bl'ast, Stöner		X	X			
Mario Lalli	Fatso Jetson, Yawning Man, Across The River		X	X			
Larry Lalli	Fatso Jetson		X				
Jesse Hughes	Eagles of Death Metal		X				
Craig Armstrong			X				
Loo Balls			X				
T. Fresh			X				
Blag Dahlia	Dwarves, Mondo Generator, Queens of the Stone Age			X			
Gene Trautmann	The Miracle Workers, Dig, Queens of the Stone Age, Eagles of Death Metal, Sumo Princess			X			
Barrett Martin	Screaming Trees, Mad Season, Queens of the Stone Age			X			
Adam Maples	earthlings?			X			
Teddy Quinn	Dig Your Own Cactus, Ministry of Fools			X			
Tony Mason	Dig Your Own Cactus			X			
Chris Goss	Masters of Reality, Goon Moon				X	X	
Alain Johannes	Eleven, What Is This?, Chris Cornell, Queens of the Stone Age, Them Crooked Vultures (live)				X	X	
Natasha Shneider	Eleven, Black Russian, Chris Cornell, Queens of the Stone Age				X		
Mark Lanegan	Screaming Trees, Mad Season, Queens of the Stone Age, The Twilight Singers, The Gutter Twins, Isobel Campbell, Soulsavers				X		
Brendon McNichol	Rattlebone, Masters of Reality, Queens of the Stone Age				X		
Samantha Maloney	Hole, Mötley Crüe, Eagles of Death Metal, Peaches				X		
Nick Eldorado	LIKEHELL				X		
PJ Harvey	PJ Harvey					X	
Troy Van Leeuwen	Failure, A Perfect Circle, Enemy, Gone Is Gone, Queens of the Stone Age, Sweethead					X	
Joey Castillo	Zilch, Wasted Youth, Danzig, Goatsnake, Sugartooth, Queens of the Stone Age, Eagles of Death Metal, Bl'ast, California Breed					X	
Dean Ween	Ween, Moistboyz					X	
Josh Freese	The Vandals, Devo, A Perfect Circle, Nine Inch Nails					X	
Jeordie White	Nine Inch Nails, Goon Moon, A Perfect Circle, Marilyn Manson					X	
Brian O'Connor	Eagles of Death Metal					X	
Christian Grahn	The Hives					X	
Sasha Vallely	Spindrift, Lords of Altamont, Mondo Generator, King Adora, Sash The Bash, Midnight Larks, The Mobsters, The Silver Chords					X	
Matt Berry							X
Billy Gibbons	ZZ Top						X
Stella Mozgawa	Warpaint						X
Jake Shears	Scissor Sisters						X
Mike Kerr	Royal Blood						X
Carla Azar	Autolux, Jack White						X
Les Claypool	Primus, Blind Illusion, the Holy Mackerel, Buckethead, Fearless Flying Frog Brigade, Oysterhead, Colonel Claypool's Bucket of Bernie Brains, The Claypool Lennon Delirium						X
Matt Sweeney	Chavez, Zwan, Skunk						X
Libby Grace							X
Töôrnst Hülpft							X
