= Volumes 5 & 6 =

Volume 5 / 6

Compilation album by The Desert Sessions
- Released: September 10, 1999
- Studio: Rancho De La Luna, Joshua Tree, CA
- Genre: Desert rock
- Length: 39:40
- Label: Man's Ruin

The Desert Sessions chronology
Volumes 3 & 4 (1998)	Volume 5 / 6 (1999)	Volumes 7 & 8 (2001)

Professional ratings
Review scores
Source	Rating
AllMusic	3/5 stars

Volumes 5 & 6 is the third compilation of Josh Homme's project The Desert Sessions. Volume 5: Poetry for the Masses (SeaShedShitheadByTheSheSore) and Volume 6: Black Anvil Ego were released separately on vinyl, and then compiled on CD with an instrumental version of "Like a Drug" as a bonus track. Queens of the Stone Age later performed "You Think I Ain't Worth a Dollar, But I Feel Like a Millionaire" on their Songs for the Deaf album, and "Rickshaw" has often been included in their live set. "Like a Drug" has been re-recorded and features on certain special editions of Lullabies to Paralyze. "I'm Dead" was recorded by Kyuss/Queens of the Stone Age bassist Nick Oliveri in an acoustic arrangement and retitled "Day I Die" for the Mondo Generator album A Drug Problem That Never Existed. This pair of sessions featured a wider range of musicians than previous releases, including Dwarves singer Blag Dahlia.

== Track listing ==
No.	Title	Length
1.	"You Think I Ain't Worth a Dollar, But I Feel Like a Millionaire"	2:53
2.	"Letters to Mommy"	3:42
3.	"I'm Dead"	1:37
4.	"Punk Rock Caveman Living in a Prehistoric Age"	3:28
5.	"Going to a Hangin'"	5:33
6.	"A#1"	3:37
7.	"Like a Drug"	2:24
8.	"Take Me to Your Leader"	4:40
9.	"Teens of Thailand"	5:37
10.	"Rickshaw"	3:44
11.	"Like a Drug (Instrumental)"	2:25

== Personnel ==
- Josh Homme: Bass, Guitar, Yamaha, Vocals, Drums, Percussion & Other Stuff
- Fred Drake: Drums, Percussion
- Dave Catching: Piano, Guitar, Noises
- Brant Bjork: Drums, Guitar, Pitter Pat
- Mario Lalli: Vocals
- Blag Dahlia: Vocals
- Gene Trautmann: Drums, Percussion
- Barrett Martin: Drums
- Adam Maples: Drums
- Teddy Quinn: Vocals
- Tony Mason: Guitar, Bass
- Nick Oliveri – Vocals
