= Volume 2: Status: Ships Commander Butchered =

Album by The Desert Sessions

EP by The Desert Sessions
- Released: February 10, 1998
- Recorded: August 5–12, 1997
- Studios: Rancho De La Luna, Joshua Tree, California
- Genres: Desert rock, stoner rock, alternative rock, experimental rock
- Length: 17:14
- Label: Man's Ruin

The Desert Sessions chronology
Volume 1: Instrumental Driving Music for Felons (1997)	Volume 2: Status: Ships Commander Butchered (1998)	Volume 3: Set Coordinates for the White Dwarf!!! (1998)

Volume 2: Status: Ships Commander Butchered is the second extended play (EP) by American desert rock collective The Desert Sessions. Recorded in August 1997 at Rancho De La Luna, it was released by Man's Ruin Records on February 10, 1998. The album features eight credited musicians, including Josh Homme, John McBain and Ben Shepherd. It was later re-released with Volume 1: Instrumental Driving Music for Felons in 1998 as Volumes 1 & 2.

== Recording and release ==
The first two Desert Sessions EPs were recorded in sessions between August 5 and 12, 1997 at Rancho De La Luna in Joshua Tree, California, a studio founded by Fred Drake and Dave Catching. The tracks on Volume 2 were engineered by Drake, with Catching assisting, and feature a total of eight credited musicians: Josh Homme (guitar, vocals, bass and keyboards), John McBain (guitar and keyboards), Ben Shepherd (bass and guitar), Brant Bjork (drums, percussion and bass), Peter Stahl (vocals), Alfredo Hernández (drums and percussion), Drake and Catching (both percussion). Homme mixed the album, and it was mastered by Tom Baker at Future Disc in Hollywood, Los Angeles, California.

Volume 2 was initially released alone on vinyl by Man's Ruin Records on February 10, 1998. It later received a re-release with its predecessor, Volume 1: Instrumental Driving Music for Felons, on CD on February 24, 1998, as Volumes 1 & 2.

== Critical reception ==
Professional ratings
Review scores
Source	Rating
AllMusic	3/5 stars

Music website AllMusic awarded Volume 2: Status: Ships Commander Butchered three out of five stars. In a four-star review of Volumes 1 & 2 for the website, Tom Schulte said the following about the albums: "Propelled by a steady rhythm section, guitars or keyboards creep in to contribute mostly spectral wails decaying with tremolo or reverb. The picture you get is very much that of a desert, a wasteland divided by a stark streak of asphalt." He summarised the album as a "soundtrack for a running reckless in a land where the only visible things are the dash panel, the headlights, and the stars".

== Track listing ==
All songs written and composed by "Acquitted Felons".

Side A
No.	Title	Length
1.	"Johnny the Boy"	4:31
2.	"Screamin Eagle"	3:38
Total length:		8:10

Side B
No.	Title	Length
3.	"Cake (Who Shit on The?)"	9:06
Total length:		9:06

== Personnel ==
Personnel credits adapted from album liner notes.

Musicians

- Josh Homme – guitars (tracks 1, 2 and 3), vocals (track 1), bass and keyboards (track 2), percussion (track 3), mixing
- John McBain – guitars (tracks 1 and 2), keyboards (track 3)
- Ben Shepherd – bass (tracks 1 and 2), guitar (track 3)
- Brant Bjork – drums (tracks 1 and 2), bass and percussion (track 3)
- Peter Stahl – vocals (tracks 2 and 3)
- Alfredo Hernández – drums (tracks 1 and 3), percussion (track 3)
- Fred Drake – percussion (track 3), engineering
- Dave Catching – percussion (track 3), engineering assistance

Production

- Tom Baker – mastering

Artwork

- Frank Kozik – designed album cover and package design
