= Volumes 9 & 10 =

The Desert Sessions 9 & 10

Compilation album by the Desert Sessions
- Released: September 23, 2003
- Recorded: February 8–15, 2003
- Studio: Rancho De La Luna, Joshua Tree, CA
- Genre: Desert rock, experimental rock
- Length: 48:50
- Label: Ipecac Recordings (IPC44); Rekords

The Desert Sessions chronology
Volumes 7 & 8 (2001)	The Desert Sessions 9 & 10 (2003)	Volumes 11 & 12 (2019)

Singles from Volumes 9 & 10
- 1. "Crawl Home" Released: November 3, 2003

Professional ratings
Review scores
Source	Rating
Allmusic	3.5/5 stars
The Guardian	4/5 stars
Pitchfork	(7.4/10)

Volumes 9 & 10 is the fifth compilation album by the hard rock ensemble the Desert Sessions, a side project of Josh Homme. It was released in 2003 on Ipecac Recordings. 9 & 10 features PJ Harvey, Ween's Dean Ween, Marilyn Manson's (and formerly of Nine Inch Nails) Jeordie White, Eleven's Alain Johannes, as well as Queens of the Stone Age's Troy Van Leeuwen (formerly of A Perfect Circle), Dave Catching of earthlings?, and Joey Castillo (formerly of Danzig).

== Track listing ==
No.	Title	Length
1.	"Dead in Love"	4:42
2.	"I Wanna Make It wit Chu"	3:42
3.	"Covered in Punk's Blood"	1:43
4.	"There Will Never Be a Better Time"	4:11
5.	"Crawl Home"	3:01
6.	"I'm Here for Your Daughter"	0:47
7.	"Powdered Wig Machine"	2:40
8.	"In My Head... Or Something"	4:41
9.	"Holey Dime"	3:34
10.	"A Girl Like Me"	3:10
11.	"Creosote"	2:34
12.	"Subcutaneous Phat"	3:49
13.	"Bring It Back Gentle"	5:48
14.	"Shepherd's Pie"	4:31

== Notes ==
- Tracks 1–6 are from Volume 9, tracks 7–12 are from Volume 10, while track 13 and 14 are bonus tracks exclusive to the CD edition.
- "Shepherd's Pie" is absent from certain physical copies.
- "Subcutaneous Phat" is incorrectly numbered as Track 11 on CD copies.
- "In My Head... Or Something" was re-recorded for Queens of the Stone Age's fourth album Lullabies to Paralyze as "In My Head".
- "Covered in Punk's Blood" was occasionally played live by Queens of the Stone Age during 2005. Along with "I Wanna Make It wit Chu", it appears on their 2005 live CD/DVD package Over the Years and Through the Woods.
- "I Wanna Make It wit Chu" was re-recorded for the Queens of the Stone Age's fifth studio album, Era Vulgaris as "Make It wit Chu".

== Personnel ==
- Josh Homme: Vocals (tracks 1,2,5,6,8,12,13), guitar (tracks 1,2,3,7,13), slide guitar (track 1), percussion (track 2), piano (track 2), snare rattle (track 6), drums (tracks 8,10), lap steel guitar (track 9), backing vocals (tracks 7,10), bass (track 12), Crumar (track 13), production, mixing, engineering
- Joey Castillo: Drums (tracks 1,3,5,9,12)
- Dave Catching: Pro-One (track 7), guitar (tracks 10,12), engineering
- Josh Freese: Drums (tracks 2,7,11,13), bass (track 8), Crumar (track 13)
- Chris Goss: Guitars (tracks 4,10)
- PJ Harvey: Piano (track 1), tenor saxophone (track 1), backing vocals (tracks 2,7), lead vocals (tracks 4,5,7,10), bass (track 5), melodica (track 9), pandeiro (track 13)
- Alain Johannes: Flute (track 1), Pro-One (track 1), "Amateur Two" (track 1), mandolin (track 1), vocals (tracks 1,6,9), piano (track 2), Rhodes (track 2), guitar (tracks 2,5,6,8,9,11), Ebow (tracks 5,10), Fun Machine (track 7), production, mixing, engineering
- Brian O'Connor: Bass (track 2,7), percussion (track 2)
- Twiggy Ramirez: Bass (tracks 3,9,10), guitar (track 5)
- Troy Van Leeuwen: Fun Machine (track 7), guitar (tracks 8,13)
- Dean Ween: Guitar (tracks 2,7,11,12,13), piano (track 8), bass (track 13)
- Jeff "The Tuff Gentleman": Bass (track 1), bass clarinet (track 1), Crumar (track 12)
