= Volume 1: Instrumental Driving Music for Felons =

EP by The Desert Sessions
- Released: November 18, 1997
- Recorded: August 5–12, 1997
- Studios: Rancho De La Luna, Joshua Tree, California
- Genres: Desert rock, stoner rock, alternative rock, experimental rock
- Length: 21:50
- Label: Man's Ruin

The Desert Sessions chronology
Volume 1: Instrumental Driving Music for Felons (1997)	Volume 2: Status: Ships Commander Butchered (1998)

Volume 1: Instrumental Driving Music for Felons is the debut extended play (EP) by American desert rock music band The Desert Sessions. Recorded in August 1997 at Rancho De La Luna, it was released by Man's Ruin Records on November 18, 1997. The album features nine credited musicians, including Josh Homme, John McBain and Ben Shepherd. It was later re-released with Volume 2: Status: Ships Commander Butchered in 1998 as Volumes 1 & 2.

== Recording and release ==
The first two Desert Sessions EPs were recorded in sessions between August 5 and 12, 1997 at Rancho De La Luna in Joshua Tree, California, a studio founded by Fred Drake and Dave Catching. The tracks on Volume 1 were engineered by Drake, with Catching and Tony Mason assisting, and featured a total of nine credited musicians: Josh Homme, John McBain (both guitars and keyboards), Ben Shepherd (bass), Alfredo Hernández, Brant Bjork (both drums), The Reverend Ponce Jones, Pete Stahl (both vocals), Drake (guitars, drums, keyboards) and Catching (bass, piano, guitar). Homme mixed the album, and it was mastered by Tom Baker at Future Disc in Hollywood, Los Angeles, California.

Volume 1 was initially released alone on vinyl by Man's Ruin Records on November 18, 1997. It later received a re-release with its follow-up, Volume 2: Status: Ships Commander Butchered, on CD on February 24, 1998, as Volumes 1 & 2.

== Critical reception ==
Professional ratings
Review scores
Source	Rating
AllMusic	3/5 stars

Music website AllMusic awarded Volume 1: Instrumental Driving Music for Felons three out of five stars. In a four-star review of Volumes 1 & 2 for the website, Tom Schulte said the following about the albums: "Propelled by a steady rhythm section, guitars or keyboards creep in to contribute mostly spectral wails decaying with tremolo or reverb. The picture you get is very much that of a desert, a wasteland divided by a stark streak of asphalt." He summarised the album as a "soundtrack for a running reckless in a land where the only visible things are the dash panel, the headlights, and the stars".

== Track listing ==
All songs written and composed by "Acquitted Felons".

Side A
No.	Title	Length
1.	"Girl Boy Tom"	4:26
2.	"Monkey in the Middle"	2:47
3.	"Girl Boy Tom"	2:52
4.	"Preaching"	0:45
Total length:		10:49

Side B
No.	Title	Length
5.	"Man's Ruin Preach"	0:51
6.	"Cowards Way Out"	5:36
7.	"Robotic Lunch"	4:34
Total length:		11:00

The two "Girl Boy Tom" tracks are actually part of a single song. "Monkey in the Middle" is crammed between the two tracks with a fade out from "Girl Boy Tom" and fade back into "Girl Boy Tom". Thus the title "Monkey in the Middle" is a sort of play on titles, being the monkey in the middle. Tracks 3, 4 and 5 are unlisted.

== Personnel ==
Personnel credits adapted from album liner notes.

Musicians

- Josh Homme – guitars (tracks 2, 6 and 7), keyboards (tracks 1 and 3), mixing
- John McBain – guitars (tracks 1, 2 and 3), lap steel guitar (track 2), keyboards (track 6), slide guitar (track 7)
- Fred Drake – guitars (tracks 1 and 3), drums (tracks 2 and 6), keyboards (tracks 2 and 6), engineering
- Dave Catching – bass (tracks 1 and 3), electronic piano (track 2), guitar (track 6), engineering assistance
- Ben Shepherd – bass (tracks 2, 6 and 7)
- Alfredo Hernández – drums (tracks 1, 3 and 7)
- The Reverend Ponce Jones – vocals (tracks 4 and 5)
- Brant Bjork – drums (track 7)
- Pete Stahl – vocals (track 7)

Production

- Tony Mason – engineering assistance
- Tom Baker – mastering

Artwork

- Frank Kozik – designed album cover and sleeve packaging
