= Volume 3: Set Coordinates for the White Dwarf!!! =

Volume 3: Set Co-ordinates for the White Dwarf!!!

EP by The Desert Sessions
- Released: May 12, 1998
- Recorded: February 1995, August 8–12, 1997 and September 1997
- Studios: Rancho De La Luna, Joshua Tree, California
- Genres: Desert rock, stoner rock, alternative rock, experimental rock
- Length: 15:12
- Label: Man's Ruin

The Desert Sessions chronology
Volume 2: Status: Ships Commander Butchered (1998)	Volume 3: Set Co-ordinates for the White Dwarf!!! (1998)	Volume 4: Hard Walls and Little Trips (1998)

Volume 3: Set Co-ordinates for the White Dwarf!!! is the third extended play (EP) by American desert rock collective The Desert Sessions. Recorded in February 1995 and August and September 1997 at Rancho De La Luna, it was released by Man's Ruin Records on May 12, 1998. The album features eight credited musicians, including Josh Homme, Peter Stahl and Ben Shepherd. It was later re-released with Volume 4: Hard Walls and Little Trips as Volumes 3 & 4.

== Recording and release ==
The third Desert Sessions EP features songs recorded at Rancho De La Luna in Joshua Tree, California, a studio founded by Fred Drake and Dave Catching, at three different sessions: one by the band earthlings? in February 1995 ("Sugar Rush"), one by The Desert Sessions between August 8 and 12, 1997 ("Nova" and "Avon") and another by earthlings? in September 1997 ("At the Helm of Hell's Ships"). The album features a total of eight credited musicians: Josh Homme, Peter Stahl (both guitars and vocals), John McBain (guitars), Ben Shepherd (bass), Alfredo Hernández (drums), Catching (guitar and bass), Drake (drums and bass) and Musharitas (vocals). The Desert Sessions tracks were mixed by Homme and the earthlings? tracks were mixed by Drake, with Musharitas co-mixing "Sugar Rush".

Volume 3 was initially released alone on vinyl by Man's Ruin Records on May 12, 1998. It later received a re-release with its follow-up, Volume 4: Hard Walls and Little Trips, on CD on October 27, 1998 as Volumes 3 & 4.

== Critical reception ==
Professional ratings
Review scores
Source	Rating
AllMusic	3.5/5 stars

Music website AllMusic awarded Volume 3: Set Co-ordinates for the White Dwarf!!! three and a half out of five stars. Writer Ned Raggett said the following in his review of the album: "Peter Stahl ... [adds] some almost good-time aggro to the sludgy crunch of the opening "Nova" as Josh Homme's guitar moodily spaces out in the middle distance. "At the Helm of Hells Ships" allows Stahl to indulge in a bit of beatnik spoken word weirdness over some muddy space rock action; it works better than it sounds. Homme himself steps to the fore vocally with "Avon," a chugging blast of feedback that would make Hawkwind proud, while the whole thing wraps up with "Sugar Rush," a steady-as-she-goes instrumental with sci-fi B-movie dialogue samples and the like. About the only thing missing is the dry heat and weed."

== Track listing ==
Side A
No.	Title	Artist	Length
1.	"Nova"	The Desert Sessions	3:24
2.	"At the Helm of Hell's Ships"	earthlings?	4:05
Total length:			7:26

Side B
No.	Title	Artist	Length
3.	"Avon"	The Desert Sessions	3:24
4.	"Sugar Rush"	earthlings?	4:19
Total length:			7:45

== Personnel ==
Personnel credits adapted from album liner notes.

Musicians

- Josh Homme – guitars (track 1 and 3), vocals (track 3), mixing (tracks 1 and 3)
- Peter Stahl – vocals (tracks 1 and 2), guitar (track 4)
- John McBain – guitars (tracks 1 and 3)
- Ben Shepherd – bass (tracks 1 and 3)
- Alfredo Hernández – drums (tracks 1 and 3)
- Dave Catching – guitar (track 2), bass (track 4)
- Fred Drake – drums (tracks 2 and 4), bass (track 2), mixing (tracks 2 and 4)
- Musharitas – vocals and mixing (track 4)

Artwork

- Frank Kozik – designed album cover and sleeve
