= Volumes 1 & 2 (The Desert Sessions album) =

Vol. I / Vol. II

Compilation album by The Desert Sessions
- Released: February 24, 1998
- Recorded: August 5–12, 1997
- Studio: Rancho De La Luna, Joshua Tree, CA
- Genre: Desert rock
- Length: 39:47
- Label: Man's Ruin

The Desert Sessions chronology
Vol. I / Vol. II (1998)	Volumes 3 & 4 (1998)

Professional ratings
Review scores
Source	Rating
AllMusic	4/5 stars

Volumes 1 & 2 is the first compilation of Josh Homme's project The Desert Sessions. Volume 1: Instrumental Driving Music for Felons and Volume 2: Status: Ships Commander Butchered were released separately on vinyl, and then compiled on CD.

This album differs from subsequent collaborative Desert Sessions in that it was recorded solely by Josh Homme's band The Acquitted Felons.

== Track listing ==
No.	Title	Length
1.	"Preaching"	0:44
2.	"Girl Boy Tom"	4:25
3.	"Monkey in the Middle"	2:47
4.	"Girl Boy Tom"	2:52
5.	"Cowards Way Out"	5:36
6.	"Robotic Lunch"	5:22
7.	"Johnny the Boy"	4:32
8.	"Screamin' Eagle"	3:36
9.	"Cake (Who Shit on the?)"	9:03
10.	"Man's Ruin Preach"	0:50

Notes

- The two "Girl Boy Tom" tracks are actually part of a single song. "Monkey in the Middle" is crammed between the two tracks with a fade out from "Girl Boy Tom" and fade back into "Girl Boy Tom". Thus the title "Monkey in the Middle" is a sort of play on titles, being the monkey in the middle.
- "Robotic Lunch" uses a different mix than found on the original EP.

== Personnel ==
- Josh Homme: vocals, guitar, keyboards, bass, percussion
- John McBain: guitar, keyboards
- Fred Drake: guitar, drums, keyboards, percussion
- Dave Catching: guitar, bass, synthesizer, percussion
- Ben Shepherd: bass, guitar
- Brant Bjork: drums, bass, percussion
- Alfredo Hernández: drums, percussion
- Pete Stahl: vocals
