= Volumes 3 & 4 =

Vol. III / IV

Compilation album by The Desert Sessions
- Released: October 23, 1998
- Recorded: 1997–1998
- Studios: Rancho De La Luna, Joshua Tree, CA
- Genre: Desert rock
- Length: 34:09
- Label: Man's Ruin

The Desert Sessions chronology
Volumes 1 & 2 (1998)	Vol. III / IV (1998)	Volumes 5 & 6 (1999)

Professional ratings
Review scores
Source	Rating
AllMusic	3/5 stars

Volumes 3 & 4 is the second compilation of Josh Homme's project The Desert Sessions. Volume 3: Set Coordinates for the White Dwarf!!! and Volume 4: Hard Walls and Little Trips were released separately on 10-inch vinyl, and then compiled on CD with the extra track "You Keep on Talkin'".

== Track listing ==
No.	Title	Length
1.	"Nova"	3:24
2.	"At the Helm of Hell's Ships"	4:05
3.	"Avon"	3:24
4.	"Sugar Rush"	4:19
5.	"The Gosso King of Crater Lake"	2:58
6.	"Monster in the Parasol"	3:42
7.	"Jr. High Love"	1:51
8.	"Eccentric Man"	4:09
9.	"Hogleg"	2:37
10.	"You Keep on Talkin'"	2:37

== Personnel ==
This Desert Sessions set featured several bands.

The earthlings? (Pete Stahl, Dave Catching, Fred Drake, and Musharitas) perform "At the Helm of Hell's Ships" and "Sugar Rush"

The Eagles of Death Metal (consisting of Jesse 'The Devil' Hughes, Loo Balls, Carlo Von Sexron, Craig Armstrong and T. Fresh) performed "The Gosso King of Crater Lake", "Hogleg" and "You Keep On Talkin'". The Eagles of Death Metal has since become a real band centered on Jesse Hughes guitars and singing instead of Loo Balls vocals. Also, 'Carlo Von Sexron' is in fact, one of Joshua Homme's monikers. He is also known to record drums and/or bass guitar for EODM to this day, though he doesn't tour with them regularly.

The Green Monarchs (consisting of Alfredo Hernández, Larry Lalli, Mario Lalli, Joshua Homme, Chris Goss, Nick Oliveri, Tony Tornay) performed "Monster In The Parasol", "Jr. High Love" and "Eccentric Man".

An unnamed grouping consisting of Pete Stahl, John McBain, Joshua Homme, Ben Shepherd, and Alfredo Hernandez performed "Nova" and "Avon", which were likely leftovers from the original set of Desert Sessions. The music tracks of both of these songs are identical with different vocal tracks. Pete Stahl sings "Nova" and Homme sings "Avon". Homme has said that this was an experiment to show how two different vocalists would treat the same piece of music.

- Josh Homme: Guitar, Vocals, Drums
- Fred Drake: Bass, Drums
- Dave Catching: Guitar, Bass
- Alfredo Hernández: Drums
- Pete Stahl: Vocals, Guitar & more
- Ben Shepherd: Bass
- John McBain: Guitar
- Nick Oliveri: Guitar, Vocals
- Mario Lalli: Keyboards, Guitar, Vocals
- Larry Lalli: Bass
- Jesse Hughes: Guitar, Vocals
- Craig Armstrong: Bass
- Loo Balls: Vocals
- T. Fresh: Turntables, Table Turner
- Tony Tornay: Drums
