= Volume 10: I Heart Disco =

EP by The Desert Sessions
- Released: September 23, 2003
- Recorded: February 8–15, 2003
- Studio: Rancho De La Luna, Joshua Tree, CA
- Genre: Desert rock
- Length: 20:28
- Label: Ipecac, Rekords Rekords

The Desert Sessions chronology
Volume 9: I See You Hearin' Me (2003)	Volume 10: I Heart Disco (2003)	Volume 11: Arrivederci Despair (2019)

The tenth The Desert Sessions LP, titled Volume 10: I Heart Disco (I Love Disco), was released in 2003, packaged along with Volume 9: I See You Hearin' Me in a gatefold 10" album format. "In My Head...Or Something" later appeared on the Queens of the Stone Age album Lullabies to Paralyze under the title "In My Head". It was his last volume until 2019's Volume 11: Arrivederci Despair.

== Track listing ==
Side A
No.	Title	Length
1.	"Powdered Wig Machine"	2:40
2.	"In My Head...or Something"	4:41
3.	"Holey Dime"	3:34
Total length:		10:54

Side B
No.	Title	Length
4.	"A Girl Like Me"	3:10
5.	"Creosote"	2:34
6.	"Subcutaneous Phat"	3:49
Total length:		9:34
