= Gayle Skidmore =

American singer-songwriter

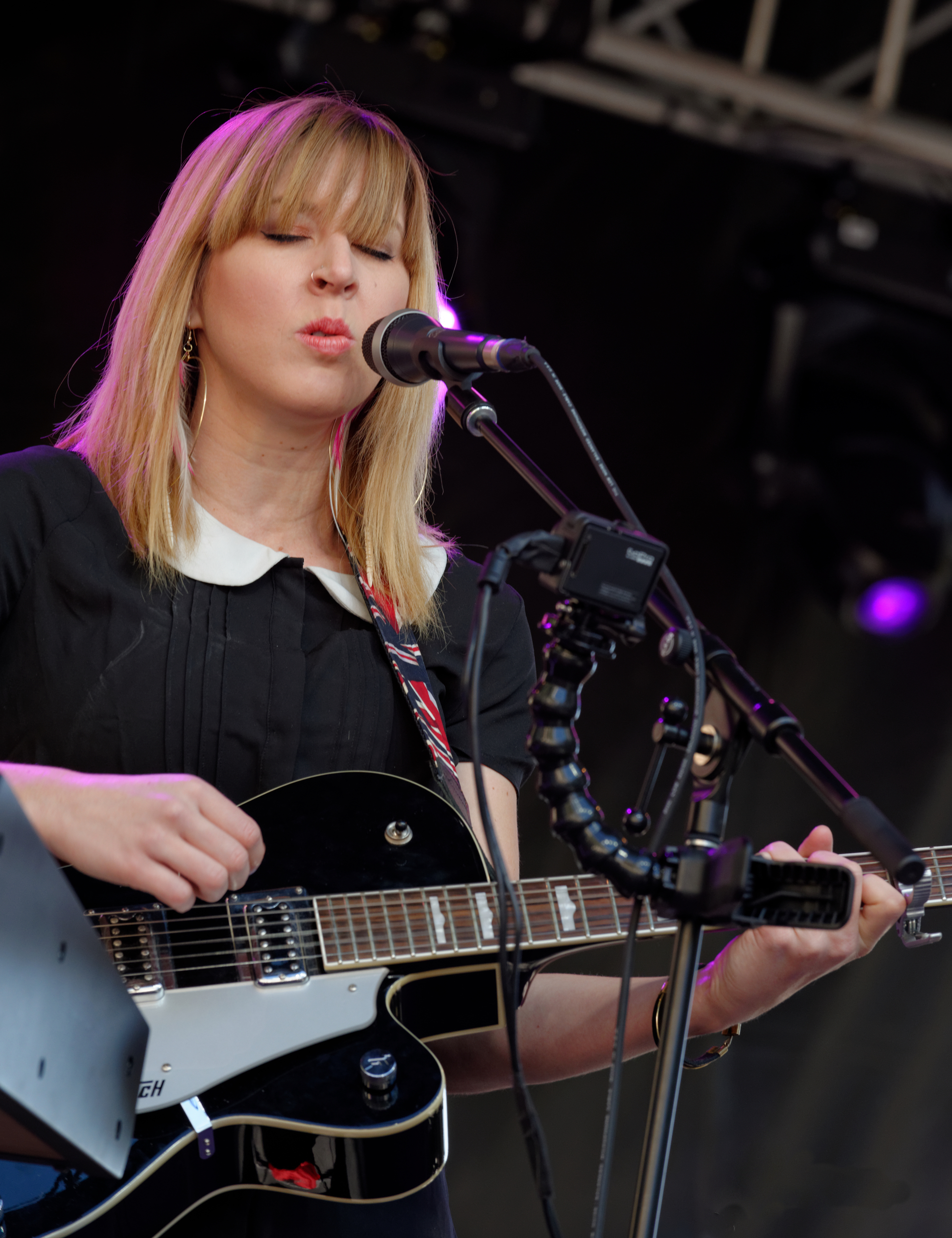

Background information
- Occupations: singer-songwriter and musician
- Instruments: electric guitar; banjo; ukulele; balalaika; melodica; harmonium; mountain dulcimer; flute; folk harp; glockenspiel; marimba; kalimba; vibraphone; organ; electric bass; stand-up bass; tambourine; mandolin; ocarina; accordion; trumpet; percussion

Gayle Skidmore is an American singer-songwriter, musician, composer, and multi-instrumentalist from San Diego, California. She has written over 2000 songs, toured worldwide, and worked together with many different artists.

== Early life and education ==
Skidmore started playing classical piano at the age of four and wrote her first songs when she was eight years old. During her childhood she often sang songs and played the piano together with her sisters and her parents. She and her sisters played the flute in middle school. By the time she turned 11 she learned to play her father's 12-string guitar and started using open tunings and different finger styles. Skidmore studied Theology in San Diego and at Oxford University.

== Career ==
Skidmore first started performing in local coffee houses in San Diego when she was 14 years old. While studying at Oxford she travelled and played shows in several countries in Europe. After going through some negative experiences with small labels, one of which having to be settled in the small claims court, she started her own independent label, Raincoat Records. Skidmore plays electric guitar, banjo, ukulele, balalaika, melodica, harmonium, mountain dulcimer, flute, folk harp, glockenspiel, marimba, kalimba, vibraphone, organ, electric bass, stand-up bass, tambourine, mandolin, ocarina, accordion, trumpet, and percussion.

Skidmore's debut EP entitled "Gayle" was released in 2002, followed by "So Deep" in 2005. She gained nationwide attention with her third EP "Paper Box" when its title track was featured in HBO's Looking, and with her fourth EP "Cowley Road", which was listed on the first ballot for the Grammy Awards in 2009. In the years that followed she released several singles, two of which were engineered by Jason Mraz, and another EP.

=== Full-length albums and coloring books ===
In 2010, Skidmore's first full-length album was released accompanied by an adult coloring book. This combination soon became a signature for Skidmore, notably before the start of the sudden increase in popularity of adult coloring books later in the 2010s Adult coloring books. Her second full-length album, "Sleeping Bear" (2014) also came with a coloring book. All of Skidmore's coloring books consist of a piece of art for each song, created by Skidmore herself, and the lyrics to the song.

Skidmore's third full-length album and adult coloring book was released in April 2017. Music was recorded in three different locations, Ninkasi studios (Eugene, OR), Rancho de la Luna (Joshua Tree, CA), and Singing Serpent (San Diego, CA). The album was engineered by James Book of the Flys, and one of the tracks features Dave Catching on guitars.

=== Awards and achievements ===
In 2013, Skidmore opened for Lisa Loeb, whom she has cited as one of her earliest influences. Skidmore's single "Paper Box" was featured in an episode of HBO's "Looking". Skidmore was nominated for the San Diego Music Awards seven times of which she won best singer-songwriter in 2013, best pop album with Sleeping Bear in 2014, and best pop artist in 2015. In the summer of 2017, Skidmore was signed by the Dutch independent label "TRPTK" and released "The New York EP". Skidmore's song "No Ordinary Life" was featured in the movie Little Women in 2018.

== Discography ==
- Gayle (2002)
- So Deep (2005)
- Paper Box (2007)
- Cowley Road (2008)
- Make Believe (2010)
- Sleeping Bear (2014)
- The Golden West (2017)
- The New York EP (2017)
