= Volume 7: Gypsy Marches =

EP by The Desert Sessions
- Released: October 16, 2001
- Studios: Rancho De La Luna, Joshua Tree, CA
- Genre: Desert rock
- Length: 16:35
- Label: Southern Lord/Rekords Rekords

The Desert Sessions chronology
Volume 6: Black Anvil Ego (1999)	Volume 7: Gypsy Marches (2001)	Volume 8: Can You See Under My Thumb? There You Are. (2001)

The seventh The Desert Sessions LP, titled Volume 7: Gypsy Marches, was released in 2001, packaged along with Volume 8: Can You See Under My Thumb? There You Are. in a gatefold 10" album format. The song "Hanging Tree" was later released on the Queens of the Stone Age album Songs for the Deaf.

This is the first release on Josh Homme's record label, Rekords Rekords.

== Track listing ==
Side A
No.	Title	Length
1.	"Don't Drink Poison"	5:02
2.	"Hanging Tree"	3:13
3.	"Winners"	1:06
Total length:		9:21

Side B
No.	Title	Length
4.	"Polly Wants a Crack Rock"	2:29
5.	"Up in Hell"	4:46
Total length:		7:15

== Reception ==
A 2023 Louder review ranking Josh Homme's albums said, "The pick of 10 volumes recorded under the banner The Desert Sessions from 1997–2003, Gypsy Marches gave full expression to Homme’s idea of collective improv, gathering a like-minded cabal of chums at his Joshua Tree ranch and creating a set of songs rich in Eastern exotica and all manner of frontier weirdness."
