= Dig (Dig album) =

Studio album by Dig
- Released: August 13, 1993
- Recorded: 1992–1993
- Studio: Stagg Street Studio
- Genres: Shoegaze; post-grunge; alternative rock
- Length: 47:58
- Labels: Radioactive; Wasteland
- Producers: Dave Jerden; Dig

Dig chronology
Runt (EP) (1992)	Dig (1993)	Soft Pretzel (EP) (1994)

Singles from Dig
- 1. "Feet Don't Touch the Ground" Released: 1993; 2. "Believe" Released: 1993; 3. "Fuck You" Released: 1993; 4. "I'll Stay High" Released: 1993; 5. "Unlucky Friend" Released: 1994

Dig is the debut studio album by alternative rock band Dig, released in 1993. It was initially released by the independent label Wasteland Records in the summer of 1993, but a few months later the band was signed to the major label Radioactive Records, who reissued the album that same year. The album contains the band's highest charting and most recognizable song, "Believe".

== Background ==
Dig was formed in 1991 by vocalist and guitarist Scott Hackwith and drummer Anthony Smedile. Shortly after, they completed the lineup with Phil Friedmann on bass, Johnny Cornwell on guitar, and Jon Morris on guitar and backing vocals. The band initially released a demo EP titled Runt on Wasteland Records.

After the release of Runt, Dig teamed up with producer Dave Jerden to record their full-length album. Jerden had extensively worked with numerous bands previously, such as Jane's Addiction, Anthrax, Alice in Chains, and Social Distortion. The album was eventually given a self-titled moniker, and it was released in the summer of 1993 by Wasteland. Due to the band's increased exposure, major label Radioactive Records (who was owned by MCA Records) signed the band and reissued the album to a wider audience in October of that same year.

== Commercial performance ==
Dig peaked at No. 153 on the Billboard 200 chart and at No. 6 on the Billboard Heatseekers chart. In addition, five separate singles were released to promote the album. Only one single, "Believe", managed to chart in the United States. "Believe" peaked at No. 19 on the Modern Rock Tracks chart and at No. 34 on the Mainstream Rock Tracks chart. Dig had a few additional singles appear on the UK Singles chart, as "Believe" peaked at No. 83, "Unlucky Friend" peaked at No. 96, and "I'll Stay High" peaked at No. 97, all in 1994.

== Promotion and subsequent events ==
Dig toured behind the album alongside bands such as Rage Against the Machine, Prong, Blind Melon, and Goo Goo Dolls. They appeared on The Jon Stewart Show, Late Night With Conan O'Brien, and MTV's 120 Minutes. While touring in Europe with Rollins Band in September 1994, Dig appeared on Mark Radcliffe's BBC radio show. They performed the songs "Believe", "Unlucky Friend", "I'll Stay High", and a cover of Pink Floyd's "Fearless".

A few other non-album tracks appeared on various soundtracks, such as "Curious George Blues" on Airheads, "Theme From Fat Albert" on Saturday Morning: Cartoons' Greatest Hits, and "Hu Hu Hu" on Virtuosity. A re-recording of "We Don't Care" (from the Runt EP) was also slated to be included on Pet Sematary Two, but was cut from the final release.

Towards the end of 1994, Dig released a promotional EP titled Soft Pretzel. It contained four recordings from the same era: the aforementioned "Fearless" (albeit recorded in a proper studio), "On the Inside", "King o' My World", and "I'm Around". Soft Pretzel would ultimately become the final release by the band's original lineup. After Dig's extensive touring schedule, they did not conduct any tours until 1996 for their second full-length album Defenders of the Universe; however, at that point, Cornwell was replaced on guitar by Dix Denney and Smedile was replaced on drums by Matt Tecu.

== Track listing ==
All tracks are written by Scott Hackwith, except otherwise noted.

No.	Title	Writer(s)	Length
1.	"Let Me Know"		4:02
2.	"I'll Stay High"		3:22
3.	"Unlucky Friend"		5:25
4.	"Anymore"		3:49
5.	"Conversation"		5:17
6.	"Believe"		4:29
7.	"Feet Don't Touch the Ground"	Scott Hackwith, Brent Rademaker	3:44
8.	"Ride the Wave"		3:42
9.	"Green Room"		3:15
10.	"Tight Brain"	Scott Hackwith, Anthony Smedile, Phil Friedmann, Jon Morris, Johnny Cornwell	2:16
11.	"Fuck You"		3:30
12.	"Decide"		5:08

== Personnel ==
- Scott Hackwith – lead vocals, guitars
- Jon Morris – guitars, backing vocals
- Johnny Cornwell – guitars
- Phil Friedmann – bass
- Anthony Smedile – drums
- Dave Jerden – production
- Steve Klein – engineering
- Robert Carranza – engineering
- Gary Kurfirst – executive production
- Eddy Schreyer – mastering
- Tim Stedman – design
- Todd Gallopo – design

== Charts ==
=== Album ===
Chart (1994)	Peak position
US Billboard 200	153
US Heatseekers Albums (Billboard)	6

=== Singles ===
Song	Chart positions		
Song	US Modern	US Main.	UK
"Feet Don't Touch the Ground"	—	—	—
"Believe"	19	34	83
"Fuck You"	—	—	—
"Unlucky Friend"	—	—	96
"I'll Stay High"	—	—	97
