= Pins (band) =

English rock band

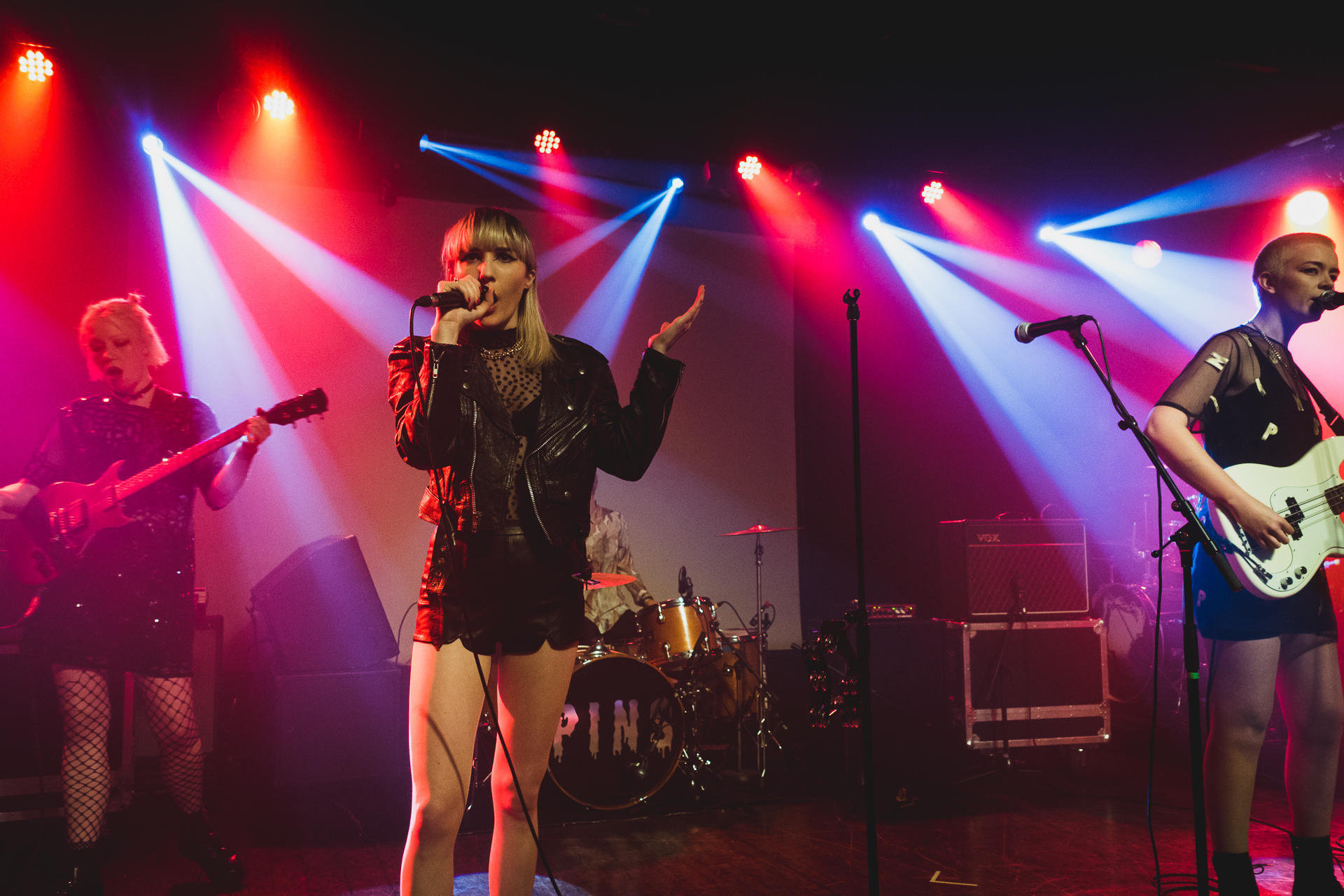
- Pins performing in 2016

Background information
- Origin: Manchester, England
- Years active: 2011–present
- Labels: Bella Union, Haus of Pins
- Members: Faith Vern; Lois MacDonald; Kyoko Swan
- Past members: Lara Williams; Anna Donigan; Sophie Galpin

Pins (stylised in all caps) are an English rock band, formed in Manchester in 2011. The group consists of singer/guitarist Faith Vern, guitarist Lois MacDonald and bassist Kyoko Swan. Singer Faith Vern cites bands such as My Bloody Valentine, Jesus and Mary Chain, and Hole as influences.

== Musical career ==
Pins formed in 2011 when fashion photographer Faith Vern (born Holgate), looking for bandmates, decided that she wanted to form an all-female band rather than be the token woman in a mostly male band.

=== 2012: "Eleventh Hour" / "Shoot You" ===
Pins self-released their first songs (A. "Eleventh Hour" / AA. "Shoot You") through their own label 'Haus of Pins' in May 2012 along with a debut video for "Eleventh Hour" directed by Sing. J. Lee. The tape sold out within a few hours and the video received a great deal of attention for the band. The band played a show supporting Savages at The Bunker in Manchester which was attended by several labels including Bella Union Records. Pins worked with Bella Union later that year to release their Luvu4lyf EP on 10" glitter vinyl. The EP was promoted alongside their first UK tour and the band later signed a recording deal with Bella Union.

=== 2013: Girls Like Us ===
Pins released their debut album Girls Like Us on 30 September 2013 via Bella Union. The album was recorded at Liverpool's Parr Street Studios and received airplay on BBC 6 Music and press coverage from The Sunday Times, NME, Drowned in Sound and Q. The album was supported by a UK and European headline tour and support dates with Warpaint and Dum Dum Girls.

Girls Like Us was released in the US in March 2014 and the band were awarded funding from PRS Foundation to perform at SXSW Festival in Austin Texas. Later that year Pins returned to the US for a headline tour of both the East and West Coast including CMJ Festival. Pins were invited to support The Growlers on their UK Tour and they also support The Fall at the London venue The Garage.

Pins re-recorded "Shoot You" / "Eleventh House" for a limited edition Record Store Day release on heart shaped vinyl. Working again with long time collaborator Sing J Lee on their video premiered on Harper's Bazaar.

=== 2015: Wild Nights ===
Pins' second album Wild Nights was released on Bella Union on 9 June 2015. The album was produced by Dave Catching at Rancho de La Luna in Joshua Tree. The first single "Too Little Too Late" was premiered by Dazed Digital and received national radio airplay on BBC 6 Music including live sessions with Marc Riley and Lauren Laverne. Rough Trade included Wild Nights in their albums of the month and it was Stereogum's 'Album of The Week.' Additional notable press coverage included NME, Harper's Bazaar, Noisey, Interview Magazine, The Guardian, and in Q.

A packed out touring schedule followed for the band. Along with performing their own sold out headline shows across Europe they supported Sleater-Kinney on the UK and European dates. Additional supports Wire, Drenge, Night Beats and Best Coast. The band also performed at Festivals including Dot 2 Dot, OYA Festival, Way Out West, Best Kept Secret and The Great Escape. Pins were again invited to perform at Austin's SXSW Festival ahead of supporting The Subways on their US Tour. They received notable airplay on US College radio performing live sessions including KEXP, KCRW, WFUV, Amoeba Records and Sony Red .

=== 2017: Bad Thing / "Aggrophobe" featuring Iggy Pop ===
Following the release of Wild Nights, Pins went back into the studio to work on new tracks. Recorded in a studio on the Scottish Borders and produced by both the band and Mark Vernon Bad Thing includes "Aggrophobe", featuring Iggy Pop's vocal. "Aggrophobe" was released on a limited edition yellow 7 inch vinyl which has now sold out and A Listed on BBC 6 Music. Additional singles from the EP ("All Hail" and "Bad Thing") were also playlisted. Press coverage included premieres from iD Magazine, Stereogum and Pitchfork. It was released as a download along with 500 limited edition 12" on Cadillac pink vinyl (sold out) on 24 March 2017 on Haus of Pins.

To support the release of Bad Thing, Pins embarked on a sold out UK headline tour followed by support tour with Maximo Park. They played a number of UK and European festivals including the main stage at Reading & Leeds and went on to support The Breeders on their UK and European dates.

Pins' final single of 2017 "Serve The Rich" was produced by Jamie Hince and released in November on limited edition baby pink 7 inch vinyl.

=== 2020: Hot Slick ===
Pins' third album Hot Slick was released on Haus of Pins on 29 May 2020.

=== Publishing ===
Pins signed a worldwide publishing deal with Just Isn't Music / Ninja Tune and have secured sync placements with Levi Jeans (Women's Fit), Snatch (TV), GT Sport (Games), Grand Tour, Angry Angel (Film), Billions (TV) Better Things (TV) The Panama Papers (Documentary) and BBC Men's Wimbledon Final (promo) which was nominated for a Music Week Sync Award. Pins were also nominated for Hardest Working Band at the AIM Awards.

== Discography ==
=== Studio albums ===
Title	Details	Peak chart positions	Certifications
Title	Details	UK	Certifications
Girls Like Us	Release date: 30 September 2013; Formats: CD, digital download, Vinyl	—	
Wild Nights	Release date: 8 June 2015; Formats: CD, digital download	—	
Hot Slick	Release date: 29 May 2020; Formats: CD, digital download, Vinyl	—	
"—" denotes releases that did not chart

=== EPs ===
- LuvU4Lyf (2012)
- Bad Thing (2017)

=== Singles ===
- "Eleventh Hour" / "Shoot You" (2012)
- "Stay True" (2013)
- "Girls Like Us" (2013)
- "Waiting for the End" (2014)
- "Shoot You" (2014)
- "Trouble" (2016)
- "Aggrophobe" ft Iggy Pop (2017)
- "All Hail" (2017)
- "Serve the Rich" (2017)
- "Hot Slick" (2020)
- "Bad Girls Forever" (2020)

=== Videos ===
- "Girls Like Us" (2013)
- "Waiting for the End" (2014)
- "Too Little Too Late" (2015)
- "Bad Thing Film" (2017)
- "All Hail" (2017)
- "Serve the Rich" (2017)
