= Volume 9: I See You Hearin' Me =

EP by The Desert Sessions
- Released: September 23, 2003
- Recorded: February 8–15, 2003
- Studio: Rancho De La Luna, Joshua Tree, CA
- Genre: Desert rock
- Length: 18:04
- Label: Ipecac, Rekords Rekords

The Desert Sessions chronology
Volume 8: Can You See Under My Thumb? There You Are. (2001)	Volume 9: I See You Hearin' Me (2003)	Volume 10: I Heart Disco (2003)

Singles from Volume 9: I See You Hearin' Me
- 1. "Crawl Home" Released: November 3, 2003

The ninth The Desert Sessions LP, Volume 9: I See You Hearin' Me, was released in 2003, packaged along with Volume 10: I Heart Disco in a gatefold 10" album format. "I Wanna Make It wit Chu" was later released on the Queens of the Stone Age album Era Vulgaris under the title "Make It wit Chu". "Covered in Punk's Blood" has also been played by the band at live shows as seen in the live album and video Over the Years and Through the Woods. Homme has since stated that "Dead In Love" and "I Wanna Make It Wit Chu" were written for Brody Dalle "I went back to do those Desert Sessions, and you can tell what I was going through because I was writing stuff like "Dead In Love" and "I Wanna Make It Wit Chu". I was so in love, I was totally revelling in it so much, I was a little paralysed”.

== Track listing ==
Side A
No.	Title	Length
1.	"Dead in Love"	4:42
2.	"I Wanna Make It wit Chu"	3:42
Total length:		8:23

Side B
No.	Title	Length
3.	"Covered in Punk's Blood"	1:43
4.	"There Will Never Be a Better Time"	4:09
5.	"Crawl Home"	3:00
6.	"I'm Here for Your Daughter"	0:44
Total length:		9:40
