= Volume 8: Can You See Under My Thumb? There You Are. =

Volume 8: Can You See Under My Thumb?...There You Are

EP by The Desert Sessions
- Released: October 16, 2001
- Studio: Rancho De La Luna, Joshua Tree, CA
- Genre: Desert rock
- Length: 18:35
- Label: Southern Lord/Rekords Rekords

The Desert Sessions chronology
Volume 7: Gypsy Marches (2001)	Volume 8: Can You See Under My Thumb?...There You Are (2001)	Volume 9: I See You Hearin' Me (2003)

The eighth The Desert Sessions LP, titled Volume 8: Can You See Under My Thumb?...There You Are, was released in 2001, packaged along with Volume 7: Gypsy Marches in a gatefold 10" album format. The name comes from a line in the song "Hangin' Tree" from the previous volume. The riff of "Cold Sore Superstars" was later used on the Queens of the Stone Age song No One Knows.

This is the first release on Josh Homme's record label, Rekords Rekords.

== Track listing ==
Side A
No.	Title	Length
1.	"Nenada"	3:10
2.	"The Idiots Guide"	3:04
3.	"Interpretive Reading"	1:36
Total length:		7:51

Side B
No.	Title	Length
4.	"Covousier"	1:50
5.	"Cold Sore Superstars"	3:24
6.	"Making a Cross"	5:31
Total length:		10:44
