= Vols. 11 & 12 =

Compilation album by the Desert Sessions
- Released: October 25, 2019
- Recorded: December 2018
- Studio: Rancho de la Luna, Joshua Tree, California and Pink Duck Studios, Burbank, California
- Genre: Desert rock; stoner rock; alternative rock; experimental rock; indie rock
- Length: 31:35
- Label: Matador
- Producer: Josh Homme

The Desert Sessions chronology
Volumes 9 & 10 (2003)	Vols. 11 & 12 (2019)

Professional ratings
Aggregate scores
Source	Rating
Metacritic	77/100
Review scores
Source	Rating
AllMusic	4/5 stars
Kerrang!	4/5
NME	4/5 stars

Vols. 11 & 12 is the sixth compilation album by the desert rock supergroup Desert Sessions, a side project of Queens of the Stone Age frontman Josh Homme. It is a compilation of the group's eleventh release, titled Arrivederci Despair and their twelfth release, titled Tightwads & Nitwits & Critics & Heels. It was released in October 2019, the group's first release after a 16-year hiatus. The album features contributions by various rock artists including Billy Gibbons of ZZ Top, Stella Mozgawa of Warpaint, Jake Shears of Scissor Sisters, Mike Kerr of Royal Blood, Carla Azar of Autolux, Les Claypool of Primus, Matt Sweeney, Dave Catching, Matt Berry, and Libby Grace.

== Track listing ==
No.	Title	Lyrics	Music	Lead vocals	Length
1.	"Move Together"	Billy Gibbons	Josh Homme, Matt Sweeney, Carla Azar, Stella Mozgawa, Les Claypool	Gibbons	5:04
2.	"Noses in Roses, Forever"	Homme	Homme, Sweeney	Homme	5:34
3.	"Far East For the Trees"		Homme, Azar, Claypool, Mozgawa	(Instrumental)	4:53
4.	"If You Run"	Libby Grace, Homme, Sweeney	Grace, Homme, Sweeney	Grace	4:00
5.	"Crucifire"	Sweeney, Homme, Mike Kerr, Jake Shears	Homme, Kerr, Shears, Sweeney	Kerr	1:45
6.	"Chic Tweetz"	Homme, Matt Berry	Berry, Mozgawa, Homme	Töôrnst Hülpft	3:47
7.	"Something You Can't See"	Shears, Kerr, Dave Catching, Sweeney	Kerr, Sweeney, Shears, Azar	Shears	3:26
8.	"Easier Said Than Done"	Homme	Homme, Azar	Homme	3:06
Total length:					31:35

== Personnel ==
- Josh Homme - Lead vocals (tracks 2, 8), guitar (tracks 1, 2, 3, 4, 5, 6, 7), percussion (tracks 1, 4), harmony vocals (tracks 4, 7), choir vocals (track 4), synth (track 4), piano (tracks 3, 8), bass (2, 5, 7), production, mixing, engineering
- Billy Gibbons - Lead vocals (track 1), guitar (track 2)
- Stella Mozgawa - Drums (tracks 2, 6), synth (tracks 1, 3), percussion (tracks 1, 2)
- Jake Shears - Lead vocals (track 7), backup vocals (tracks 1, 5, 6, 8), harmony vocals (track 8)
- Mike Kerr - Lead vocals (track 5), guitar (track 8), acoustic guitar (track 7), bass (track 4), backup vocals (tracks 1, 8), percussion (tracks 1, 4), piano (track 8), choir vocals (track 4)
- Carla Azar - Drums (tracks 1, 3, 4, 5, 7, 8), synth (tracks 1, 5), percussion (tracks 1, 3, 4, 8), steel drum (track 7), backup vocals (track 1), choir vocals (track 4)
- Les Claypool - Bass (tracks 1, 2, 3)
- Matt Sweeney - Guitar (tracks 1, 2, 3, 4, 5, 7, 8), acoustic guitar (track 4), backup vocals (tracks 1, 2, 8), percussion (tracks 1, 4), choir vocals (track 4)
- Libby Grace - Lead vocals (tracks 4), harmony vocals (track 4), choir vocals (track 4)
- Matt Berry - Organ (track 6), inner monologue vocals (track 6)
- Dave Catching - Synth (track 8) Bass (track7) Drum loop (track 1)
- Töôrnst Hülpft (Note: Many fans speculate that Töôrnst Hülpft is a pseudonym for a different artist. Proposals for his true identity include Homme, Dave Grohl, and Trent Reznor, among others. Homme has said that Hülpft is a stranger who showed up for the recording of "Chic Tweetz." Beyond this, Hülpft's identity has not been officially confirmed by anyone affiliated with the Desert Sessions.) - Lead vocals (track 6)
- Mark Rankin - Mixing (tracks 1, 4), engineering
