= Volume 4: Hard Walls and Little Trips =

EP by The Desert Sessions
- Released: September 22, 1998
- Recorded: June 23–26, 1998
- Studios: Monkey Studios, Palm Springs, California
- Genres: Desert rock, stoner rock, alternative rock, experimental rock
- Length: 15:28
- Label: Man's Ruin
- Producer: Josh Homme

The Desert Sessions chronology
Volume 3: Set Coordinates for the White Dwarf!!! (1998)	Volume 4: Hard Walls and Little Trips (1998)	Volume 5: Poetry for the Masses (SeaShedShithead; ByTheSheSore) (1999)

Volume 4: Hard Walls and Little Trips is the fourth extended play (EP) by American desert rock collective The Desert Sessions. Recorded in June 1998 at Monkey Studios, it was released by Man's Ruin Records on September 22, 1998. The album features twelve credited musicians, including Josh Homme, Nick Oliveri and Mario Lalli. It was later re-released with Volume 3: Set Coordinates for the White Dwarf!!! as Volumes 3 & 4. "Monster in the Parasol" would later be re-recorded for the Queens of the Stone Age album Rated R under the title, "Monsters in the Parasol".

== Recording and release ==
The fourth Desert Sessions EP was recorded in sessions between June 23 and 26, 1998 at Monkey Studios in Palm Springs, California. The sessions were produced by Josh Homme, engineered and mixed by Homme and Steve Feldman, and featured a total of twelve credited musicians: Homme (drums, guitars and vocals), Larry Lalli, Craig Armstrong (both bass), Alfredo Hernández, Tony Tornay (both drums), Loo Balls, Chris Goss (both vocals), Jesse Hughes (guitars), T. Fresh (turntables), Nick Oliveri (guitar and vocals) and Mario Lalli (guitar, keyboards and vocals).

Volume 4 was initially released alone on vinyl by Man's Ruin Records on September 22, 1998. It later received a re-release with its predecessor, Volume 3: Set Coordinates for the White Dwarf!!!, on CD on October 27, 1998 as Volumes 3 & 4.

== Critical reception ==
Professional ratings
Review scores
Source	Rating
AllMusic	3.5/5 stars

Music website AllMusic awarded Volume 4: Hard Walls and Little Trips three and a half out of five stars. Writer Ned Raggett said the following in his review of the album: "it's furry classic FM/bonghit-inspired action as usual on tracks like "Monster in the Parasol" and "Hogleg," plus the intentionally stupid punk-thrash "Jr. High Love"."

== Track listing ==
Side A
No.	Title	Artist	Length
1.	"The Gosso King of Crater Lake"	Eagles of Death Metal	2:58
2.	"Monster in the Parasol"	The Green Monarchs	3:46
3.	"Jr. High Love"	The Green Monarchs	1:51
Total length:			8:35

Side B
No.	Title	Artist	Length
4.	"Eccentric Man" (The Groundhogs cover)	The Green Monarchs	4:12
5.	"Hogleg"	Eagles of Death Metal	2:37
Total length:			6:53

== Personnel ==
Personnel credits adapted from album liner notes.

Musicians

- Josh Homme – drums (tracks 1 and 5), guitars (tracks 2 and 4), backing vocals (tracks 3 and 4), vocals (track 2)
- Larry Lalli – bass (tracks 2, 3 and 4)
- Mario Lalli – guitars (tracks 2, 3 and 4), vocals (track 4), keyboards (track 2)
- Alfredo Hernández – drums (tracks 2 and 4)
- Loo Balls – vocals (tracks 1 and 5)
- Jesse Hughes – guitars (tracks 1 and 5)
- Craig Armstrong – bass (tracks 1 and 5)
- T. Fresh – turntables (tracks 1 and 5)
- Chris Goss – vocals (track 2)
- Nick Oliveri – guitar and vocals (track 3)
- Tony Tornay – drums (track 3)

Artwork

- Frank Kozik – designed album artwork and sleeve
