= The Miracle Workers =

American rock band

- Origin: Portland, Oregon, United States
- Genres: Garage rock
- Years active: 1982–1992
- Past members: Gerry Mohr; Joel Barnett; Ron Sheridan; Dan Demiankow; Gene Trautmann; Matt Rogers; Robert Butler; Aaron Sperkse; Jeff Grassi

The Miracle Workers were a rock and roll band in the 1980s, who began as a garage rock revival band in Portland, Oregon.

== Background ==
The Miracle Workers were formed in January 1982 by Gerry Mohr (vocals), and Joel Barnett (bass guitar). The original guitarist and drummer, who were friends of Gerry's, left the band early on. Matt Rogers, a friend of Joel's, became the guitarist. Ron Sheridan became the drummer, though would later leave to pursue a business career. The band stabilized in 1984, with the addition of Dan Demiankow (guitar, organ), and Gene Trautmann (drums).

The Miracle Workers lineup in 1987 became Gerry Mohr (vocals), Matt Rogers (guitar), Robert Butler (bass), and Gene Trautmann (drums).

== Recording career ==
Several songs on compilation LPs, with the band line up being Gerry, Matt, Joel, and Ron. Recordings from 1982.

- Miracle Workers, was a four-song EP on Moxie Records, released in 1984. Line up was Gerry Mohr, Joel Barnett, Matt Rogers, Danny Demiankow, and a short term drummer, Jeff Grassi.
- A Thousand Micrograms of the Miracle Workers, on Sounds Interesting Records, 1984, 6 song EP, marked Gene Trautmann's recording debut with the band.
- Inside Out, Voxx/Bomp 1985 LP, was recorded in Los Angeles. This is the band's most successful LP, and received critical acclaim in North America and Europe. It has since been re-issued on CD. Of all the recordings it is the easiest to find.

These recordings, and the band's style was in line with contemporary garage rock revival acts, such as The Chesterfield Kings and Lyres.

The Miracle Workers' liking for harder edged, late-sixties/early-seventies bands such as the MC5, The Stooges, and Flamin' Groovies came to the fore. Their sound became very influenced by this and it can be heard on their LPs Live at the Forum, Overdose, Primary Domain, and Roll out the Red Carpet, with the first two being especially notable, regarding that influence.

The 1989 LP on Get Hip Records, Moxie's Revenge, supplemented this period with outtakes and unreleased recordings.

== Los Angeles ==
In the Spring of 1986, the band decided to move to Los Angeles. Joel Barnett left the band at that time. Robert Butler, from The Untold Fables, became the bass player and Dan Demiankow quit over musical differences. Due to internal problems within the band, they split up in 1992. The band came together back in Portland to record "Anatomy of a Creep" a year later. The Triple xxx recording would be their last, produced by Thee Slayer Hippie (Steve Hanford/Drummer Poison Idea) and involved original drummer Gene Trautmann, replacing Aaron Sperske who was relieved of duties near the time of recording "Anatomy of a Creep".

== Break up and slow fade ==
Gene Trautmann quit the band circa 1990 and was replaced on drums by Aaron Sperske. Aaron Played on the Roll Out the Red Carpet album. The Miracle Workers split in the early 1990s, but before calling it quits they returned to Portland and recorded a new CD, Anatomy of a Creep, for their label, Triple X. Gene Trautmann resumed drumming duties. This record was apparently issued, but in small quantities, as it is difficult to find.

Members of the group resurfaced in Portland, Oregon in the mid-1980s and in Switzerland in the late 1990s, in several bands playing blues, psychobilly, and garage rock, such as The Bo Diddley Headhunters; Cavemannish Boys; The Wicked Ones; The Get Lost and Queens of the Stone Age. In LA the band incorporated more hard rock and alternative rock influences paralleling the grunge scene in Seattle. The Miracle Workers were amongst the founding bands of the stoner rock movement.

In the late 1980s, alternative cartoonist Joe Sacco followed the band on their Europe tour, as T-shirt salesman and chronicling comics journalist. These comics have been collected in the compilation But I Like It, published by Fantagraphics in 2006.

== Discography ==
=== Studio albums ===
- Inside Out (Voxx Records 1985)
- Overdose (Love's Simple Dreams 1987)
- Primary Domain (Glitterhouse Records 1989)
- Roll Out the Red Carpet (Triple X Records 1991)
- Anatomy of a Creep (Triple X Records 1995)

=== Singles and EPs ===
- Miracle Workers (Moxie Records 1984)
- 1000 Microgramms Of The Miracle Workers (Sounds Interesting Records 1984)
- Blue Girl (Lost Trails 1987)
- When A Woman Calls My Name (Love's Simple Dreams 1988)
- Miracle Workers Slow Death / I Got A Right (Teenager From Outer Space Records 1988)
- Strange Little Girl (Get Hip Recordings 1989)
- Mary Jane (Glitterhouse Records 1989)
- Way Back When (Sympathy For The Record Industry 1990)

=== Live albums ===
- Live At The Forum (Glitterhouse Records 1988)
