= Dig (band) =

American alternative rock band

- Origin: Los Angeles, California, U.S.
- Genres: Alternative rock; grunge; shoegaze
- Years active: 1991–1999; 2004–2008; 2016–present
- Labels: Radioactive; Universal; Wasteland; Radio Universe; Cassette Recordings; Den of Wax

Dig is an American alternative rock band from Los Angeles, California. Formed in 1991, they achieved success with their 1993 album Dig, which featured the charting single "Believe". The band then released the album Defenders of the Universe in 1996. It was followed by their third album Life Like in 1999, in which they then disbanded that same year. They reunited briefly from 2004 to 2008, and again in 2016. Dig released their fourth album, (i), in 2025. Scott Hackwith (lead vocals/guitars) and Jon Morris (guitars/backing vocals) are the only members to stay in the band for its entire run, although the current lineup also consists of original guitarist Johnny Cornwell.

== History ==
=== Formation, major label signing, and mainstream success with Dig (1991–1994) ===
Dig formed in 1991 within Los Angeles, as vocalist Scott Hackwith had operated his own home studio and also worked at Propaganda Films. Hackwith and drummer Anthony Smedile formed the band together, and they then recruited Jon Morris on guitar and backing vocals, Johnny Cornwell on guitar, and Phil Friedmann on bass. The band utilized the four guitars in order to emphasize their shoegaze influences. The band released a demo EP in 1992 titled Runt on the independent label Wasteland Records.

In 1993, Dig signed with Radioactive Records and issued their first full-length album that year, the self-titled Dig. It was produced by Dave Jerden, who was known for producing albums by rock/metal bands such as Alice in Chains and Anthrax. The album peaked at No. 153 on the Billboard 200 and No. 6 on the Billboard Heatseekers charts. In order to support the album, Dig toured the US with the likes of Prong, Rage Against the Machine, and Blind Melon. The single "Believe" was played regularly on MTV's Buzz Bin, and it had reached No. 19 on the Modern Rock Tracks and No. 34 on the Mainstream Rock Tracks charts. Although "Believe" was the band's hit song, the record labels had done an unlikely move, and issued four other singles from the same album, although they all failed to chart in the US. Overseas in the UK, Dig had fared a bit better on the UK Singles chart, as "Believe" peaked at No. 83, "Unlucky Friend" peaked at No. 96, and "I'll Stay High" peaked at No. 97, all in 1994. The single "Unlucky Friend" had featured four tracks recorded by Dig while on Mark Radcliffe's FM radio show when they toured the UK alongside Rollins Band.

Towards the end of 1994, Dig released the promotional Soft Pretzel EP, which included three original songs and also a Pink Floyd cover, "Fearless". Also in 1994, the band's song "Curious George Blues" was exclusively recorded for the soundtrack to the movie Airheads. The following year, their cover of the "Theme From Fat Albert" was included on the compilation Saturday Morning: Cartoons' Greatest Hits. They also recorded another exclusive song, "Hu Hu Hu", for the soundtrack of the movie Virtuosity.

=== Initial lineup changes and Defenders of the Universe (1995–1997) ===
From the beginning of 1995 until the middle of 1996, the band had not gone on any tours due to their prior exhaustive schedule; however, in 1996, they released their second album, Defenders of the Universe. The album was almost entirely mixed by Tom Lord-Alge, a mixer with hundreds of credits to his name. The album and its touring cycle had guitarist Cornwell replaced by Dix Denney (former member of The Weirdos), and also drummer Smedile replaced by Matt Tecu.

Unlike Dig's previous album, none of the songs charted, and the album itself had not charted either. The band also played dramatically less shows overall. The following year, Dig's record label parent Universal Records had shifted them from Radioactive Records to their other imprint, Radio Universe.

=== Life Like and disbandment (1998–1999) ===
After the label shift, the band released their third album Life Like in early 1999. Sylvia Massy took over mixing duties for the entirety. The album was recorded as a four-piece, since guitarist Denney left the band, and both Hackwith and Morris handled guitar duties. Other changes in the lineup included original bassist Friedmann replaced by Jay Nicholas, and drummer Tecu replaced by Gene Trautmann. For the touring cycle, bassist Nicholas was replaced by Rob Redick, and guitarist Joel Graves was added into the band to round out the five members; however, with a lack of support from the band's record label and only sporadic shows being played, the band was dropped from Radio Universe/Universal Records in July 1999, and the Radio Universe imprint officially went defunct later in the year. After the small touring cycle, new bassist Redick joined Candlebox and new drummer Trautmann joined Queens of the Stone Age. Original guitarist Morris had stepped away as well, and it signified the end of Dig.

=== First reunion (2004–2008) ===
In 2004, the band reappeared, and played sporadic one-off shows. The lineup included frontman Hackwith, original guitarists Morris and Cornwell, second drummer Tecu, and new bassist Jamie Carter; however, when 2007 rolled around, Tecu was replaced by Dave Stedronsky and Carter was replaced by prominent Rocket From the Crypt member Pete Reichert. They recorded the first new Dig song in years, titled "No One's There", and it appeared on a Poison Tree Records: Road to Nowhere compilation, alongside bands such as Fu Manchu and The Dwarves. Afterwards, various sessions of recording commenced; however, nothing ever surfaced.

=== Second reunion and (i) (2016–present) ===
In 2016, the band was revived yet again to play a singular show in West Hollywood. Along with Hackwith, Morris, and Cornwell, new bassist Marcus Blake and new drummer Charlie George had joined the lineup. After another period of only random updates, the band launched their own independent merch store in early 2020 and had started recording again, but with new bassist Tommy Black (former member of The Wildabouts) joining the band. In November 2020, the band announced a new album with an unknown release date, posting a sample on their official social media outlets. The album's first single, titled "Nothing Is Forever", was released in January 2021 with an accompanying music video. The second song, "Treatment", was released the following month with a music video as well. On March 10, 2023 former guitarist Denney (who appeared on Dig's second album Defenders of the Universe) died at the age of 65.

Dig returned to a live setting in July 2023, and the lineup changed again with the additions of Ernesto Mora on bass and Matt Bennett on drums. In May 2025, Dig released a split-single with the band Inspired Flight, which featured the Dig song "Sunset & Embery". It was also confirmed that the band's fourth album was nearly finished, five years after its initial announcement. The album, titled (i), was eventually released on August 29, 2025.

== Members ==
=== Current members ===
- Scott Hackwith – lead vocals, guitars (1991–1999, 2004–2008, 2016–present)
- Jon Morris – guitars, backing vocals (1991–1999, 2004–2008, 2016–present)
- Johnny Cornwell – guitars (1991–1995, 2004–2008, 2016–present)
- Ernesto Mora – bass (2023–present)
- Matt Bennett – drums (2023–present)

=== Past members ===
- Phil Friedmann – bass (1991–1997)
- Anthony Smedile – drums (1991–1995)
- Dix Denney – guitars (1995–1997); died 2023
- Matt Tecu – drums (1995–1997, 2004–2006)
- Gene Trautmann – drums (1997–1999)
- Jay Nicholas – bass (1997–1998)
- Rob Redick – bass (1998–1999)
- Joel Graves – guitars (1998–1999)
- Jamie Carter – bass (2004–2006)
- Pete Reichert – bass (2006–2008)
- Dave Stedronsky – drums (2006–2008)
- Charlie George – drums (2016–2023)
- Marcus Blake – bass (2016–2020)
- Tommy Black – bass (2020–2023)

== Discography ==
Studio albums

- Dig (1993, Radioactive/Universal)
- Defenders of the Universe (1996, Radioactive/Universal)
- Life Like (1999, Radio Universe/Universal)
- (i) (2025, Cassette Recordings)

EPs and singles

- Runt EP (1992, Wasteland)
- "Feet Don't Touch the Ground" (1993, Wasteland)
- "Fuck You" (1993, Radioactive)
- "Believe" (1993, Radioactive)
- "I'll Stay High" (1993, Radioactive)
- "Unlucky Friend" (1994, Radioactive)
- Soft Pretzel EP (1994, Radioactive)
- "Whose Side You On?" (1996, Radioactive)
- "Live in Sound" (1999, Universal)
- "Nothing Is Forever" (2021, Cassette Recordings)
- "Treatment" (2021, Cassette Recordings)
- "Sunset & Embery" (2025, Den of Wax)
