= Ted Quinn =

American singer-songwriter (born 1958)

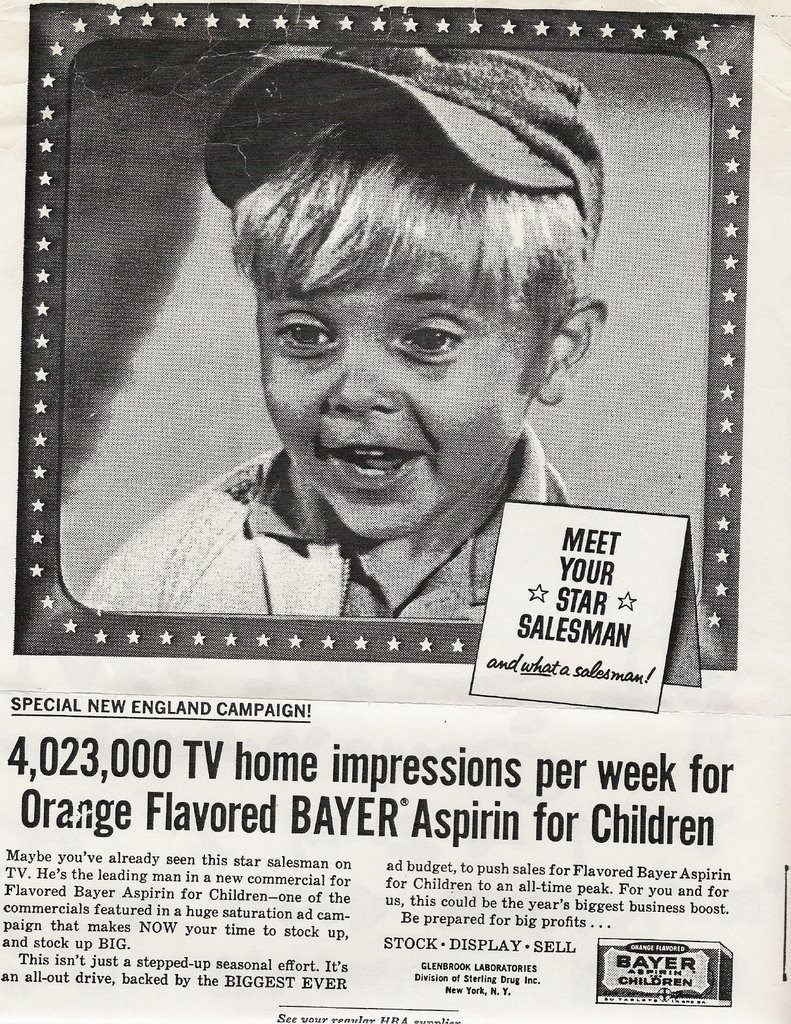
- Born: Teddy Quinn; November 12, 1958 (age 67); La Porte, Indiana, U.S.
- Occupations: Actor, musician, record producer, radio personality
- Years active: 1963–present

Teddy "Ted" Quinn (born November 12, 1958, in La Porte, Indiana) is an American musician, record producer, radio personality and actor. As Teddy Quinn, he was a child actor who appeared in many commercials, films, and television shows of the 1960s and 1970s.

Quinn's first appearance was as "Mike" in a one-minute television commercial for Bayer Children's Aspirin in 1963. The script extolled the virtues of mothers who care deeply for their children's health. Quinn's final line was – "Mothers are like that ... yeah, they are"— and the last three words were an endearing ad lib that caught the public's fancy. One columnist wrote, "Probably no 'commercial' personality in television history has so completely captured the interest and affection of viewers as little Teddy Quinn, who became famous overnight with the phrase: 'Mothers are like that... yeah they are'... The hundreds of letters the company receives about Teddy Quinn are an excellent indication of the impact of his personality on the public. They come from all over the country and many actually ask that the commercial be repeated." The ad also caught the attention of casting agents, leading to his career in Hollywood, including roles in Bonanza, Dr. Kildare, The Virginian, The Courtship of Eddie's Father, Accidental Family and as Scott Baldwin on General Hospital. His motion picture career includes roles in Madame X (1966), The Ghost and Mr. Chicken (1966), The Ballad of Josie (1967), Bewitched (1968) and Necromancy (1972).

In 1974 Quinn embarked on a career as a musician. During the 1990s, he was one of the co-founders, with Fred Drake and Dave Catching, of the Rancho De La Luna recording studio in Joshua Tree, California, and he continues to collaborate there as a singer, guitarist, and producer. He is a member of the band Rock Art and has released a number of CDs. In 2006 co-wrote lyrics with American recording artist Justin Winokur for the song "End of the Road", which appeared on Winokur's 2008 album "Leaving". The album was produced in Sweden by multi-platinum producer Christoffer Lundquist and reissued in 2019. After several years as a local radio DJ, he is currently DJing at Radio Free Joshua Tree, a live streaming internet station. He also organizes music festivals, and hosts two long-running live music venues: the weekly open mic Reality Show at Pappy & Harriet's in Pioneertown (2007–present) and the Open Jam Super Ruby Tuesday show at the Joshua Tree Saloon (2008–present).
