= Gene Trautmann =

American drummer (born 1966)

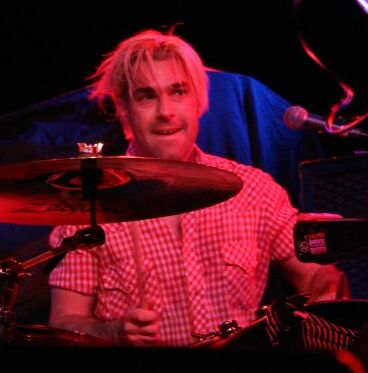
- Trautmann performing with Eagles of Death Metal in 2006

Background information
- Born: Eugene Peter Trautmann; November 30, 1966 (age 59); Portland, Oregon, U.S.
- Genres: Stoner rock; hard rock; garage rock; alternative rock
- Occupations: Drummer; set dresser
- Years active: 1984–present
- Formerly of: Queens of the Stone Age; Dig; The Miracle Workers; Eagles of Death Metal (touring member); Mojave Lords; Sumo Princess

Eugene Peter Trautmann (born November 30, 1966) is an American drummer, best known for his work with rock bands Queens of the Stone Age, Dig and the Miracle Workers, and as a touring member of Eagles of Death Metal. He has also contributed to releases by The Desert Sessions and toured with Mark Lanegan.

== Biography ==
Born and raised in Portland, Oregon, Trautmann started playing drums along to records when he was 11 years old. He has cited Kiss' appearance on The Paul Lynde Halloween Special in 1976 as influential in his decision to play music. Trautmann began playing in punk bands in high school and eventually joined the garage rock band The Miracle Workers. After graduating from Oregon Episcopal School in 1985, Trautmann moved to Los Angeles with the band and played with them on several albums, in addition to touring the United States and Europe.

Following Brant Bjork's departure from Kyuss in 1994, Trautmann auditioned for the band and played with the group for two weeks before the spot eventually went to Alfredo Hernández. Trautmann was later briefly a member of the band Dig from 1997 to 1999, playing on their 1998 album Life Like. In 1999, Trautmann contributed to The Desert Sessions compilation Volumes 5 & 6. He joined Josh Homme's post-Kyuss band, Queens of the Stone Age, in June 1999 and contributed drums to four tracks on their 2000 album Rated R and five B-side tracks. Trautmann departed the band in September 2001 during the recording process for Songs for the Deaf and featured on two tracks off the album released the following year.

Following his departure from Queens of the Stone Age, Trautmann toured with Mark Lanegan in support of his studio album Field Songs and worked as a set dresser in the film industry. In 2005, he appeared on the Queens of the Stone Age live/video album Over the Years and Through the Woods in video footage from their tour in support of Rated R. He later joined Homme's other band Eagles of Death Metal as a touring member from 2006 to 2008. In 2017, Trautmann formed the bass-and-drums collaboration Sumo Princess with Abby Travis. The duo released their debut album, When An Electric Storm, in 2019. As part of the band Mojave Lords with former Eagles of Death Metal bandmates Dave Catching and Brian O'Connor, Trautmann appeared on the album Expensive Feelings in 2021.

== Discography ==
Year	Artist	Title	Song(s)
1984	The Miracle Workers	1,000 Micrograms Of. . . The Miracle Workers	
1985	The Miracle Workers	Inside Out	
1987	The Miracle Workers	Overdose	
1988	The Miracle Workers	Motor City Madness	"Little Doll"
1989	Zebra Stripes	Zebra Is Her Name	
1989	The Miracle Workers	Primary Domain	
1992	Mouth	Foreword	
1993	The Miracle Workers	Live At The Forum	
1993	The Miracle Workers	Nineteeneightyfourway	
1995	The Miracle Workers	Anatomy Of A Creep	
1998	Dig	Life Like	
1999	The Desert Sessions	Volumes 5 & 6	"I'm Dead", "Punk Rock Caveman Living In A Prehistoric Age", "Take Me To Your Leader", "Rickshaw"
2000	Queens of the Stone Age	Rated R	"Feel Good Hit of the Summer", "Monsters in the Parasol", "Quick and to the Pointless", "Tension Head", "Ode to Clarissa", "You're So Vague", "Never Say Never", "Who'll Be The Next In Line", "Born to Hula"
2001	Queens of the Stone Age	Alpha Motherfuckers – A Tribute to Turbonegro	"Back To Dungaree High"
2002	Queens of the Stone Age	This Is Where I Belong – The Songs of Ray Davies & The Kinks	"Who'll Be The Next In Line"
2002	Queens of the Stone Age	Songs for the Deaf	"You Think I Ain't Worth a Dollar, But I Feel Like a Millionaire", "Go with the Flow"
2002	Earthlings?	Disco Marching Kraft	"Disco Marching Kraft", "Gentle Grace", "Family Ford"
2004	Nick Oliveri	Demolition Day	"All I've Got"
2004	Forever Changing Concept / Mario Lalli & Friends	R&B Records Presents	"Monoxide Dreams", "The Golden Age Of Cellblock Slang"
2006	Nick Oliveri and the Mondo Generator	Dead Planet: SonicSlowMotionTrails	"All I've Got", "Four Corners"
2006	Brats On The Beat	Ramones For Kids	
2006	Evil Beaver	Models Of Virtue	
2007	Evil Beaver	In The Spirit Of Resilient Optimism	
2008	Killroy	Football Chants & Angry Rants	All tracks except 5 and 10
2010	Fatso Jetson	Archaic Volumes	"Monoxide Dreams"
2011	The Twilight Singers	Dynamite Steps	"On The Corner"
2011	Sara Johnston	Trespassing	
2011	Manna	Shackles	"Soul To Keep", "Drumming Song"
2012	White Hills / Farflung	To Find The Secret Door / Fade	"Fade"
2012	Farflung / Black Land	Orbital Decay / The Ecstasy Of Awakening	"Orbital Decay"
2012	Farflung / Black Rainbows	Farflung & Black Rainbow	"Lupine", "Punching Holes In The Twilight"
2012	Drag News	Drag News EP	
2016	Atomirotta	II	
2016	Farflung	5	"Lupine"
2016	The Shit	Rue Du Chocolat	"Asshole"
2017	David Catching	Shared Hallucinations Pt.1	"Your Daddy's Waitin'", "Electric Neon Feathered Hair", "Candy", "C'mon Pt. 2"
2017	Nick Oliveri	N.O. Hits At All Vol.2	"Back To Dungaree High"
2017	Sun Trash	Sun Trash	
2018	Atomirotta	III	All tracks except 4
2019	Sumo Princess	When An Electric Storm	
2020	Atomirotta	IV	
2021	Mojave Lords	Expensive Feelings	
