= Dave Catching =

American musician (born 1961)

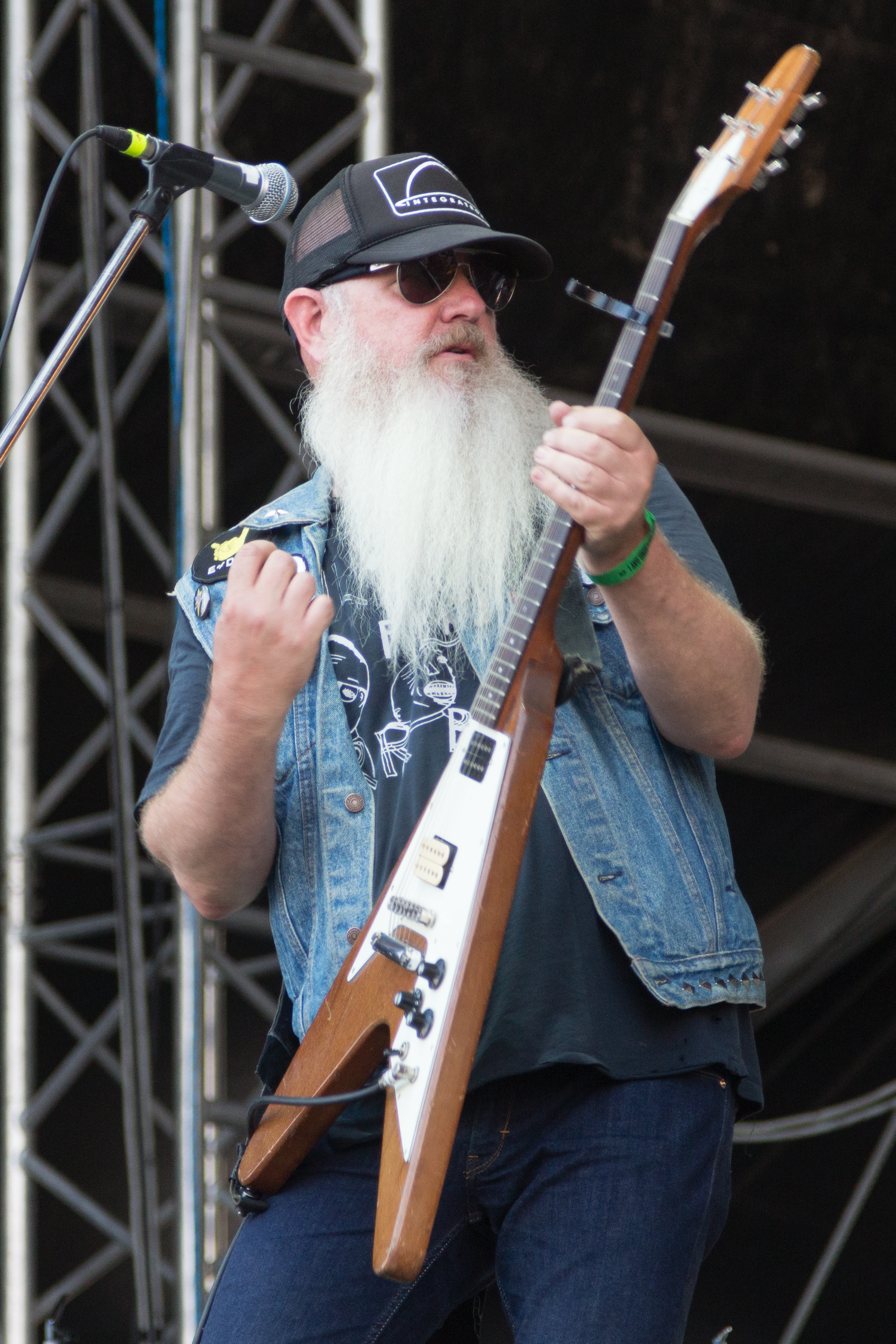
- Catching at Nova Rock 2015

Background information
- Also known as: Diamond Dave; Darlin' Dave; Davey Jo; Snohawk
- Born: David Catching; June 7, 1961 (age 65)
- Origin: Memphis, Tennessee, U.S.
- Genres: Stoner rock; hard rock; desert rock; garage rock revival; acid rock; psychedelic rock; blues rock
- Occupations: Musician; songwriter; record producer
- Instruments: Vocals; guitar; bass; keyboards
- Years active: 1978–present

David Catching (born June 7, 1961) is an American musician from Memphis, Tennessee. He founded the California stoner rock band earthlings? in 1993, was a member of Queens of the Stone Age from 1996-2000, a touring member of Eagles of Death Metal from 2003-2017 and is the co-founder and operator of the Rancho De La Luna recording studio.

== Career ==
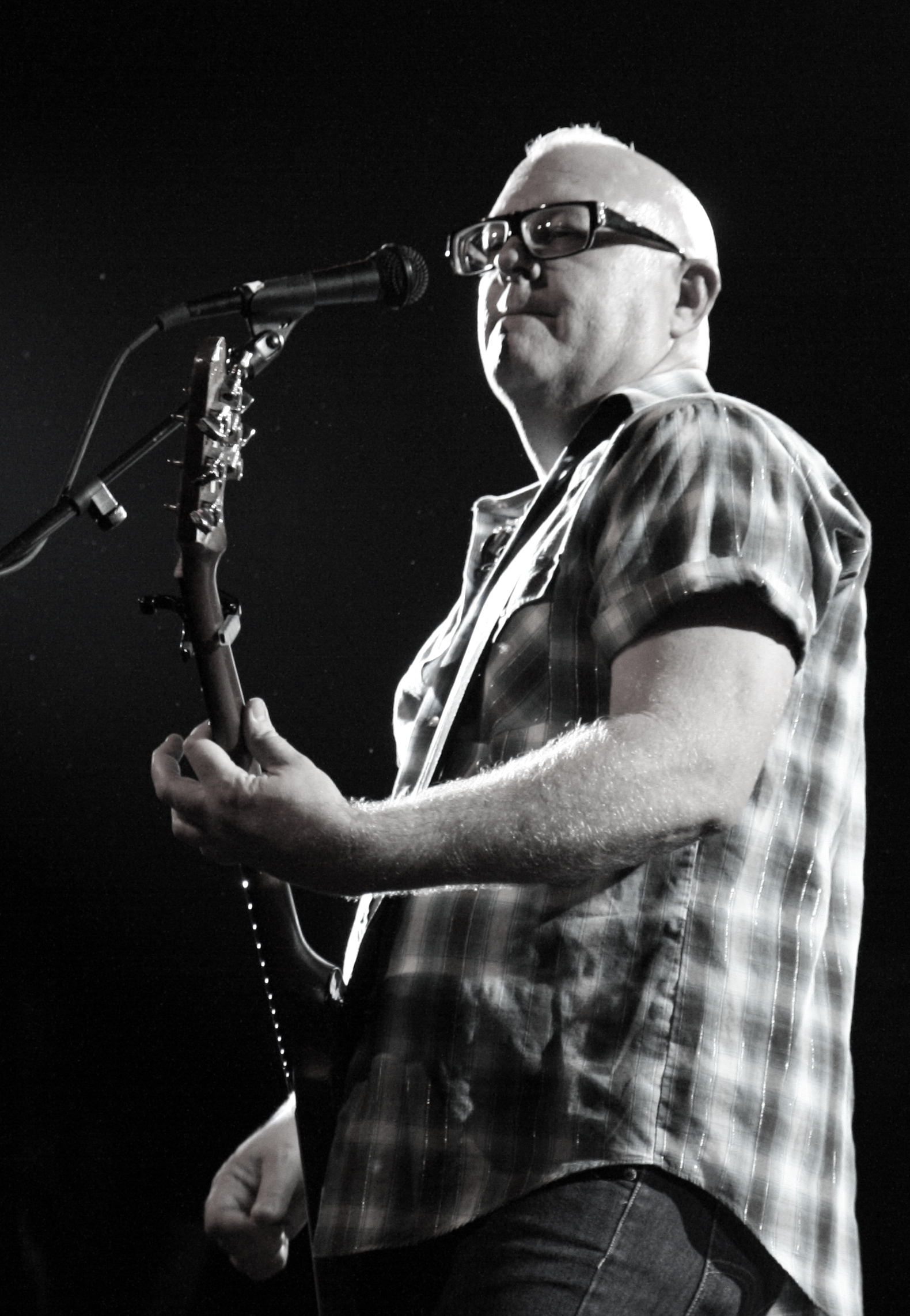
Catching performing with the Eagles of Death Metal in 2009

Catching has played the guitar for well-known hard rock bands Eagles of Death Metal, Queens of the Stone Age, Tex and the Horseheads, as well as Mark Lanegan, The Ringling Sisters, earthlings?, Mondo Generator and the Masters of Reality, Yellow #5, and Gnarltones.

Catching has been associated with the desert country rock band, Smith & Pyle. He contributed to the debut album of country rock duo Smith & Pyle, It's OK to be Happy, which was recorded at his recording studio Rancho de la Luna and released in 2008. He currently resides in Joshua Tree, California.

Catching was on stage with Eagles of Death Metal during the November 2015 Paris attacks, and escaped the Bataclan with the rest of the band. Catching talked about this at length on the show Conan Neutron's Protonic Reversal, Rolling Stone and other media.

== Musical equipment ==
With earthlings?, Mojave Lords and other live performances Catching plays a 1984 Gibson Les Paul, gifted to him by his brother in law, Frank Watts. He also uses for live shows and recording Echopark Guitars Albert 58, and Yamaha AES 1500.

His pedalboard consists of Earthquaker Devices, Dispatch Master and Astral Destiny, a T.C. Electronics Polytune 2 tuner, and Spark, Jim Dunlop Wah pedal and Rotovibe pedal, Origin Me-Q Drive, Dr No Effects Colossus, Solid Gold FX Lysis and EM-III, Boss DD#3 Delay, Radial BigShot, into a combination of Bruce Zinky Tremoverb, and Mofo, or Lanham Amps Dragonslayer with Colby Amps Elpico.

With the Eagles of Death Metal, Catching played his 1967 Gibson Flying V through a tuner and distortion pedal and Supro amplifier with a 2x12 cabinet and Orange Amplifiers. He also used an Ampeg Dan Armstrong guitar when playing with Eagles of Death Metal. Catching also uses HipStrap vintage styled guitar straps. He is endorsed by and uses Ernie Ball ultra slinky guitar strings, coiled red Bullet Cable.

Catching released a signature fuzz wah pedal in 2015, the Roadrunner, through Dr. No Effects.

In 2023 partnered with Grancasino Factory to imagine and develop the F.R.E.D. or Frequency Re-arranging Experimentation Device, cited by Catching as a tribute to Fred Drake, his departed former partner in Rancho de la Luna as 'an unequalled sonic enhancement device befitting such a fantastic, uniquely wonderful, talented man as Fred Drake

From 1993-2015 with earthlings?, he used his 1958 Fender Stratocaster or his 1972 double cutaway Gibson Les Paul through a tuner and a distortion Rat pedal. His Les Paul is 1 of 6 ever made by Strings & Things in Memphis, Tennessee. Other guitars were bought by Ace Frehley, Jeff Beck, Pat Travers, and Michael Woods, guitarist for the group America. Photos have circulated of Dave's very guitar nearly being bought by Greg Lake of Emerson, Lake, and Palmer fame, but opting out at the last minute for an acoustic bass.

Catching co-founded Rancho de la Luna recording studio with Fred Drake in 1993. After Drake's death in 2002, Catching has since run the studio and continues to this day, hosting such musical acts as Foo Fighters, Queens of the Stone Age, Arctic Monkeys, Iggy Pop, Daniel Lanois and many others

== Partial discography ==
- The Modifiers (1980s)
- 60 Watt Reality (The Ringling Sisters, 1990)
- earthlings? (earthlings?, 1996)
- Queens of the Stone Age, 18AD on Burn One Up! compilation album (1997)
- The Desert Sessions 1 & 2 (1998)
- Queens of the Stone Age (Queens of the Stone Age, 1998)
- Scraps at Midnight (Mark Lanegan, 1998)
- The Desert Sessions 3 & 4 (1998)
- The Desert Sessions 5 & 6 (1999)
- Rated R (Queens of the Stone Age, 2000)
- Human Beans (earthlings?, 2000)
- Deep in the Hole (Masters of Reality, 2001)
- Songs for the Deaf (Queens of the Stone Age, 2002)
- A Drug Problem That Never Existed (Mondo Generator, 2003)
- The Desert Sessions 9 & 10 (2003)
- Bubblegum (Mark Lanegan Band, 2004)
- III the EP (Mondo Generator, 2004)
- Cowboy Coffee and Burnt Knives (Hulk, 2004)
- Lullabies to Paralyze (Queens of the Stone Age, 2005)
- I Got a Brand New Egg Layin' Machine (Goon Moon, 2005)
- Impeach My Bush (Peaches, 2006)
- Death by Sexy (Eagles of Death Metal, 2006)
- Powder Burns (The Twilight Singers, 2006)
- Dead Planet (Mondo Generator, 2006)
- Licker's Last Leg (Goon Moon, 2007)
- Neptune (The Duke Spirit, 2008)
- Prime Motivator (Giraffes, 2008)
- Heart On (Eagles of Death Metal, 2008)
- Saturnalia (Gutter Twins, 2008)
- Humalien (earthlings?, 2009)
- Pine Cross Dover (Masters of Reality, 2009)
- Blues Funeral (Mark Lanegan Band, 2012)
- Spine Hits (Sleepy Sun, 2012)
- Tomorrowland Blues (Star & Dagger, 2013)
- Do to the Beast (Afghan Whigs, 2014)
- Unfuckwithable (Mojave Lords, 2014)
- ecaps (earthlings?, 2014)
- Wild Nights (PINS, 2015)
- Your Desert My Mind (The Mutants, 2016)
- Mudda Fudda (earthlings?, 2016)
- Mojave Lords (Gloria In Absentia, 2017)
- The Golden West (Gayle Skidmore, 2017)
- Shared Hallucinations Pt.1 (David Catching and Friends, 2017)
- The Desert Sessions 11 & 12 (2019)
- Expensive Feelings (Mojave Lords, 2021)
- Rabbit Rabbit (Speedy Ortiz, 2023)
