= Fred Drake =

American musician (1958–2002)

Frederick Charles Drake II (January 28, 1958 – June 20, 2002) was an American musician best known as a founding member of earthlings?. Drake is also renowned for having been co-owner (along with Dave Catching) of Rancho De La Luna, the setting for the collaborative musical project The Desert Sessions, in which he took part.

Drake recorded with a wide variety of musicians including; Daniel Lanois, Josh Homme, Queens of the Stone Age, Victoria Williams, Dave Grohl, Ted Quinn, Pete Stahl, Wool, Dean Ween and many others.

Fred released three solo works: Sky Party, Twice Shy and Shy Party.

He is credited with influencing the "desert sound" which has great depth and direction, taking advantage of stereo and quadraphonic effects as well as 32 track digital recording. Drake lived in Joshua Tree, California, Hollywood, Texas, and London. He died of cancer at age of 44 in 2002.

== Partial discography ==
- Twice Shy (2001)
- The Sky Party (2004)
