= Rancho De La Luna =

Recording studio in Joshua Tree, California, United States

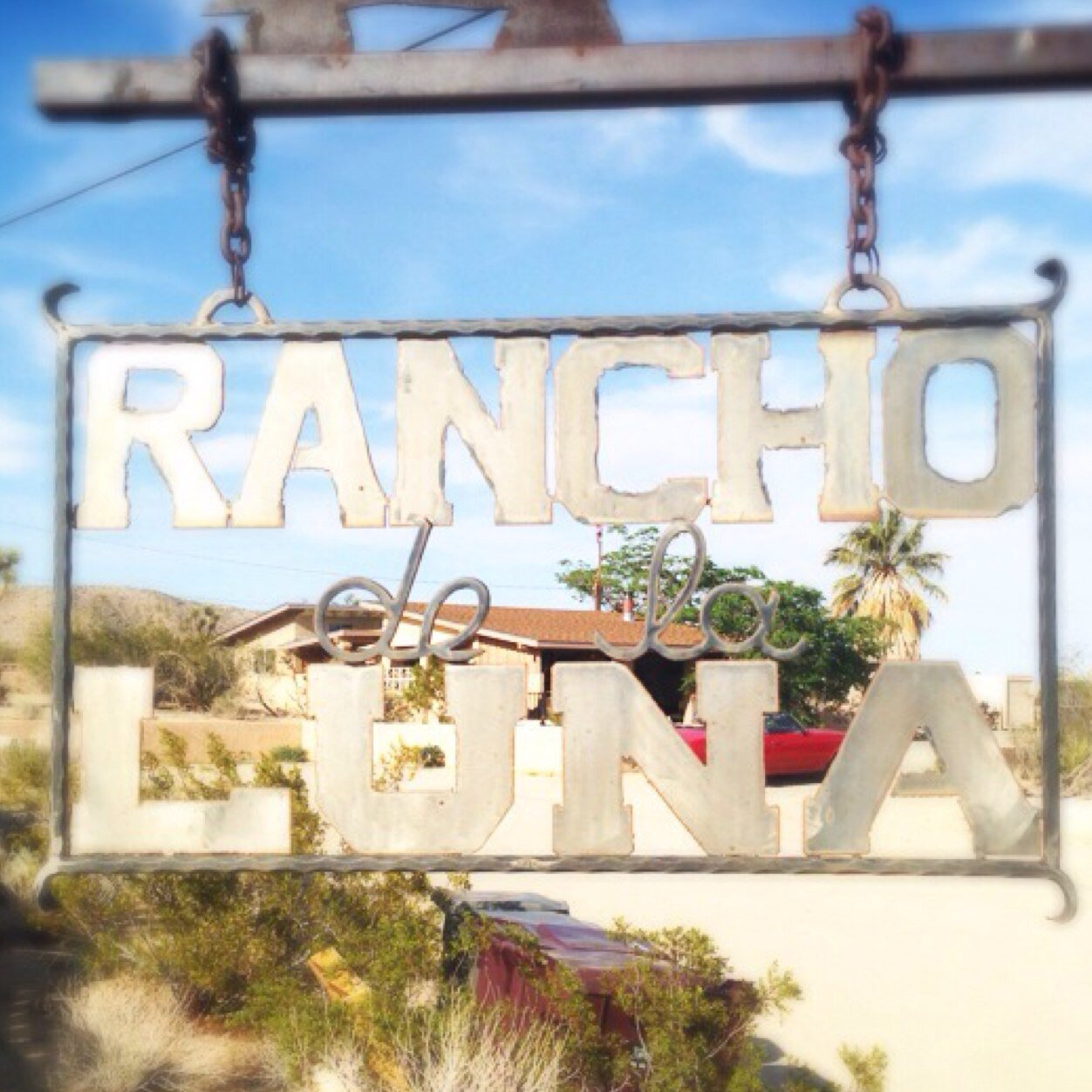
- The Rancho De La Luna sign outside the studio
- Type: Recording studio
- Industry: Music
- Founded: 1993
- Founder: Fred Drake and David Catching
- Headquarters: Joshua Tree, California, U.S.
- Website: ranchodelaluna.com

Rancho De La Luna is a recording studio in Joshua Tree, California, founded in 1993 by Fred Drake and David Catching. After Drake's death in 2002, the studio was operated by Catching and Drake's collaborators Tony Mason, Ted Quinn, Dean Chamberlain, Billy Bizeau and Fred Burke until 2004. It has since doubled as Catching's home, where he serves as engineer, producer, guest musician and chef for artists. The studio is cited as everything in it being "weird and wonderful but functional", filled with vintage and new idiosyncratic recording gear and a raw desert vibe curated by studio founders Drake and Catching.

The studio is best known for being the home of the Desert Sessions, which has included sessions with Daniel Lanois, Josh Homme, Alain Johannes, Natasha Shneider, Dean Ween, Twiggy Ramirez, Joey Castillo, Pete Stahl, Mario Lalli, Troy van Leeuwen, Nick Oliveri, Brant Bjork, Chris Goss, Ben Shepherd, Alfredo Hernandez, Gene Trautmann, David Catching, Brian O'Connor and Jesse Hughes.

According to Catching: "There is something about this studio. Everyone that's been here and recorded here, including me, feels it, so there is something to it. Maybe it's just all the love that's accumulated here from over the years. People do freak out about the drum room: many say it's the best drum sound they have ever gotten—even the engineers."

Catching has described the distinctive nature of the special nature of the studio in multiple sources. Owing to its pastoral and unique location, it is a favorite spot for tech gear spotlights. Many artists have talked about the relaxed and easy nature of the studio, citing the lack of distraction and easy availability of uncommon and interesting instruments as welcoming and unique.

Alain Johannes explains: "Everything is the opposite of a, quote-unquote, professional studio: 'What is this – are you sure it's a mic? It looks like a grenade…' You plug it in… find out if it goes off."

== Notable bands and artists to record at the Rancho De La Luna ==
- Arctic Monkeys
- Avalanche Party
- Autolux
- Band of Horses
- Barb Wire Dolls
- Bingo's Dream Band
- Blood Lemon
- Boots
- Brant Bjork
- Butch Vig
- Chris Shinn
- CKY
- Crocodiles (band)
- Daniel Lanois
- Dash Rip Rock
- Dave Grohl
- Desert Sessions (including sessions with Josh Homme, Alain Johannes, Natasha Schneider, Dean Ween, Twiggy Ramirez, Joey Castillo, Pete Stahl, Mario Lalli, Troy van Leeuwen, Nick Oliveri, Brant Bjork, Chris Goss, Ben Shepherd, Alfredo Hernandez, David Catching, Fred Drake, Mathias Schneeberger, Brian O'Connor, Jesse Hughes, PJ Harvey, Stella Mozgawa, Les Claypool, Billy Gibbons, Matt Sweeney, Carla Azar, * John McBain
- Dot Hacker
- The Duke Spirit
- Eagles of Death Metal
- Earth
- Earthless
- earthlings?
- Ecca Vandal
- Eighties Matchbox B-Line Disaster
- Fatso Jetson
- Foo Fighters featuring Joe Walsh
- Full Tone Generator
- Fu Manchu
- The Gama Sennin
- Ghalia Volt
- The Giraffes
- Goatsnake
- Goon Moon
- Gutter Twins (Mark Lanegan and Greg Dulli)
- Household Gods (David Pajo of Slint, Vern Rumsey of Unwound)
- Hulk
- Iggy Pop
- James Eleganz
- James Ford
- John Garcia
- Josh Freese
- Kurt Vile
- Kyuss
- L.S. Dunes
- Mark Lanegan
- Masters of Reality
- Mondo Generator
- Midget Handjob featuring Keith Morris
- Mojave Lords
- The Mutants
- Nine50nine featuring Dave Krusen and Ty Willman
- Philiac
- PINS
- PJ Harvey
- Puddles Pity Party
- Queens of the Stone Age
- Skegss
- Skip Danko and B Movie Road Show
- Sky Valley Mistress
- Sloburn
- Smith & Pyle
- Space Electric
- Sparta
- Speedy Ortiz
- Steve Agee
- Tinariwen
- Twilight Singers
- Troy Kingi
- UNKLE
- Victoria Williams
- Wool

== Rancho De La Luna Mezcal ==
In 2016, David Catching and Bingo Richey released a signature brand of Mezcal named after the studio. Built, in part, off of the "consumption" of liquor at the studio for sessions.

== Rancho De La Luna in other media ==
- The studio was the focus of the fifth episode of the Foo Fighters Sonic Highways series
- Anthony Bourdain filmed the thirteenth episode of the seventh season of his travel series No Reservations at the Rancho De La Luna.
- The studio is featured heavily in the documentary American Valhalla, which chronicles the creation of the Post Pop Depression album by Iggy Pop and the ensuing tour.

== See also ==
- Desert rock
