= Electric Wizard discography =

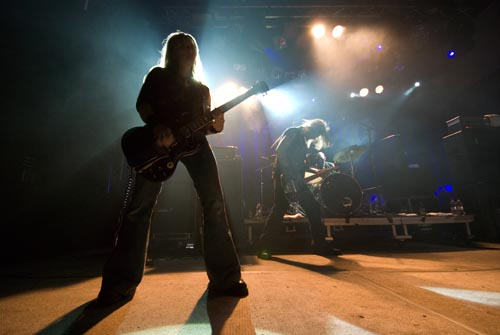
- Electric Wizard performing live in 2007
- Studio albums: 9
- Extended plays: 6
- Compilation albums: 2
- Music videos: 2

This is the discography of British heavy metal band Electric Wizard.

== Studio albums ==
Year	Album details	Peak chart positions				
Year	Album details	FIN	FRA	UK	US	US Heat.
1994	Electric Wizard: Released: 1994; Label: Rise Above; Format: CD, vinyl	—	—	—	—	—
1997	Come My Fanatics...: Released: 1997; Label: Rise Above; Format: CD, vinyl	28	—	—	—	—
2000	Dopethrone: Released: 25 September 2000; Label: Rise Above; Format: CD, vinyl	—	—	—	—	—
2002	Let Us Prey: Released: 25 March 2002; Label: Rise Above; Format: CD, vinyl	—	—	—	—	—
2004	We Live: Released: 28 June 2004; Label: Rise Above; Format: CD, vinyl	—	—	—	—	—
2007	Witchcult Today: Released: 20 November 2007; Label: Rise Above; Format: CD, vinyl	—	—	—	—	—
2010	Black Masses: Released: 1 November 2010; Label: Rise Above; Format: CD, vinyl	32	—	—	—	26
2014	Time to Die: Release: 29 September 2014; Label: Spinefarm; Format: CD, vinyl	17	148	76	64	—
2017	Wizard Bloody Wizard: Release: 10 November 2017; Label: Spinefarm; Format: Cassette, CD, vinyl	35	—	—	—	—
"—" denotes a release that did not chart.

== Extended plays ==
Year	Album details	Peak chart positions	Notes
Year	Album details	FIN	Notes
1996	Demon Lung: Released: 1996; Label: Rise Above	—	Split 7" with Our Haunted Kingdom.
1997	Chrono.Naut: Released: 1997; Label: Man's Ruin	—	
1997	Chrono.Naut / Nuclear Guru: Released: 1997; Label: Man's Ruin	—	Split CD with Orange Goblin.
1998	Supercoven: Released: 3 August 1998; Label: Bad Acid	—	Reissued with extra songs in 2000.
2008	The House on the Borderland: Released: 5 September 2008; Label: Rise Above	8	Split 12" with Reverend Bizarre.
2008	The Processean: Released: 13 December 2008; Label: Rise Above	—	Sold exclusively at the Rise Above Records 20th Anniversary Show.
2012	Legalise Drugs and Murder: Released: 31 March 2012; Label: Rise Above (vinyl), Satyr IX Productions (cassette); Format: Vinyl, cassette	—	800 Clear 7" sold exclusively at the London HMV show. Comes with B-side "Murder and Madness". Later announced will be released on 800 Purple. Cassette came free with October issue of Terrorizer #228 (October 2012). Containing 6 tracks. On 23 June 2016, it was re-issued on 12" EP via Witchfinder Records.
"—" denotes a release that did not chart.

== Compilation albums ==
Year	Album details
1999	Come My Fanatics.../Electric Wizard: Released: 1999; Label: Rise Above
2006	Pre-Electric Wizard 1989–1994: Released: 2006; Label: Rise Above

== Live albums ==
Year	Album details
2024	Black Magic Rituals & Perversions Vol. 1: Released: 2024; Label: Spinefarm

== Music Videos ==
●"Mountains of Mars" (1994) ●"Son of Nothing" (1997) ●"Doom-Mantia" (1997) ●"Wizard in Black" (1997) ●"Funerapolis" (2000) ●"We Hate You" (2000) ●"Barbarian" (2000) ●"Master of Alchemy" (2002) ●"Flower of Evil" (2004) ●"The Sun Has Turned to Black" (2004) ●"Satanic Rites of Drugula"(2007) ●"Raptus" (2007) ●"Dunwich" (2007) ●"Black Mass" (2010) ●"Turn Off Your Mind" (2010) ●"Crypt of Drugula" (2010) ●"Murder & Madness" (2012) ●"I Am Nothing" (2014) ●"Sadiowitch" (2014) ●"Lucifer's Slave" (2014) ●"Incense for the Damned" (2014) ●"We Love the Dead" (2014) ●"See You in Hell" (2017) ●"Wicked Caresses" (2017) ●"L.S.D" (2021)
