= Legalise Drugs & Murder =

EP by Electric Wizard
- Released: 31 March 2012
- Genres: Doom metal; stoner metal; sludge metal
- Length: 11:50 (7"); 34:36 (Cassette); 36:06 (12")
- Labels: Rise Above; Satyr IX Productions; Witchfinder Records
- Producer: Jus Oborn

Electric Wizard chronology
Black Masses (2010)	Legalise Drugs & Murder (2012)	Time to Die (2014)

12" Vinyl & Cassette Cover

Legalise Drugs & Murder is the fifth EP by English stoner/doom metal band Electric Wizard. It was released in March 2012.

== Background ==
On 1 October 2012 Electric Wizard issued the EP in a cassette form that came bundled with issue #228 of Terrorizer Magazine. This version contained four additional tracks. One of the songs, a 2012 remastered demo of "Satyr IX" from Black Masses, was released as a flexi disc for issue #94 of Decibel Magazine on 1 August 2012. "Patterns of Evil" is an alternate mix from the song on Black Masses. "Lucifer (We've Gone Too Far)" and "Our Witchcult Grows..." are unreleased outtakes.

On 23 June 2016 it was re-issued on 12" EP via Witchfinder Records.

== Track listing ==
all_writing = Jus Oborn and Liz Buckingham, except where noted.

7"
No.	Title	Length
1.	"Legalise Drugs & Murder"	6:22
2.	"Murder & Madness"	5:28
Total length:		11:50

12"
No.	Title	Writer(s)	Length
1.	"Legalise Drugs & Murder"		6:22
2.	"Satyr IX" (2012 Demo)	Oborn	7:15
3.	"Murder & Madness"		5:26
4.	"Patterns of Evil" (Remix)	Oborn	6:40
5.	"Lucifer (We've Gone Too Far)"		6:23
6.	"Our Witchcult Grows..."		5:40
Total length:			36:06

Cassette
No.	Title	Writer(s)	Length
1.	"Legalise Drugs & Murder"		6:20
2.	"Satyr IX" (2012 Demo)	Oborn	7:13
3.	"Murder & Madness"		5:24
4.	"Patterns of Evil" (Remix)	Oborn	6:39
5.	"Lucifer (We've Gone Too Far)"		6:21
6.	"Our Witchcult Grows..."		2:39
Total length:			34:36

== Personnel ==
=== Electric Wizard ===
- Jus Oborn – guitar, bass on tracks 1, 2, 4 & 5, vocals on tracks 1–5
- Liz Buckingham – guitar on tracks 1–5
- Shaun Rutter – drums on "Satyr IX" & "Patterns of Evil"
- Andrew Prestige – drums on "Legalise Drugs and Murder" & "Murder & Madness"
- William Palmer – bass on "Legalise Drugs and Murder"

=== Production and Art ===
- Jus Oborn – art, layout and design
