= Black Masses =

Studio album by Electric Wizard
- Released: 1 November 2010
- Recorded: May–August 2010
- Studios: Toe Rag Studios, London, England
- Genres: Doom metal; stoner metal
- Length: 59:09
- Label: Rise Above
- Producers: Jus Oborn, Liam Watson

Electric Wizard chronology
Witchcult Today (2007)	Black Masses (2010)	Legalise Drugs and Murder (EP) (2012)

Limited Edition cover

Black Masses is the seventh studio album by English stoner/doom metal band Electric Wizard, released 1 November 2010. It is the band's only album to feature bassist Tas Danazoglou.

== Background ==
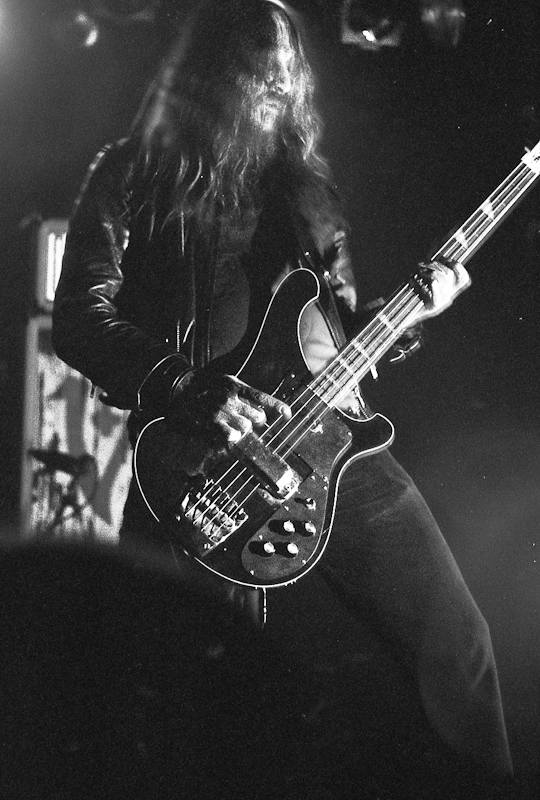
Black Masses is the only Electric Wizard album to feature bassist Tas Danazoglou.

Guitarist-vocalist Jus Oborn described the album as a "continuation of Witchcult Today in many respects," although he also sees it as part of a lineage composed of Come My Fanatics..., Supercoven, Dopethrone, and Witchcult Today. However, he does draw a contrast between Black Masses and Witchcult Today in that he views the former as "violent, aggressive" and the latter as "mellow and alluring".

"Venus in Furs" is based on the book of the same name by Leopold von Sacher-Masoch; however, the song made references to the film of the same name by Jesús Franco. As Oborn notes, "Venus in Furs" is "about evil women. Every song on the album is a meditation on a different type of evil. When you say the term 'Venus in furs,' people get the image in their mind of a dominant female. So that's our 'evil woman' song. It's a classic doom theme."

When asked about the influence of drugs upon the album, Oborn concedes

"It's a good part of my life to a certain degree, so it's hard to separate them. I think our sound is steeped in it to a certain degree, and improvisation is quite a lot based on drugs....You gotta be slightly telepathic and drugs can help that definitely. You can write brilliant music when you're not on drugs, but you don’t have that connection with other musicians, that telepathy. I think that's the important thing for a band, for the musicians."

== Album information ==
This is their first album since Electric Wizard to not feature a song longer than 10 minutes in length, although the fifth track, "Satyr IX", is close to the mark, clocking in at 9:58.

== Reception ==
Professional ratings
Review scores
Source	Rating
About.com	4/5 stars
AllMusic	3.5/5 stars
Beatsperminute.com	54%
Metal Forces	8/10
Onemetal.com	3.5/5 stars
Stereokiller.com	4/5 stars

David Schalek with About.com wrote that "Black Masses has the right amount of accessible, catchy stoner laden riffs to go along with the generally heavy assault of Electric Wizard's form of Black Sabbath-descended doom metal."

Doomantia largely celebrated the album, proclaiming "if you thought Witchcult Today was too polished, then you will love Black Masses. It's an more ugly, sleazy and dirty album than Witchcult Today but it hasn't got the sickness that gets spewed at you during Dopethrone. In a way it takes all the elements from all their albums, melts them down and turns them into something different again. It's a nasty, angry beast of a recording that oozes sleaze and reeks of satanic nightmares and drug induced apocalyptic visions."

The album received some criticism, with Onemetal.com describing the album as "scattered and unfocused," with performances that are "loose to the point of bordering on sloppy," and a murky production. However, the author did concede that the album was a "grower" that improved with subsequent exposure.

== Track listing ==
All music by Jus Oborn, except where noted; all lyrics by Oborn.

No.	Title	Music	Length
1.	"Black Mass"	Jus Oborn, Liz Buckingham	6:06
2.	"Venus in Furs"		6:22
3.	"The Nightchild"	Oborn, Buckingham	8:02
4.	"Patterns of Evil"		6:30
5.	"Satyr IX"		9:58
6.	"Turn Off Your Mind"	Oborn, Buckingham	5:51
7.	"Scorpio Curse"		7:31
8.	"Crypt of Drugula"		8:49
Total length:			59:09

== Personnel ==
=== Electric Wizard ===
- Jus Oborn – guitar, vocals
- Liz Buckingham – guitar
- Tas Danazoglou – bass
- Shaun Rutter – drums

=== Guest musicians ===
- Edryd Turner – Mellotron on "The Nightchild"

=== Production and art ===
- Liam Watson – produced, mixed and engineered
- Justin Oborn – art, layout and design
- Ester Segarra – band photo

== Release history ==
Year	Label	Format	Country	Out of Print?	Notes
2010	Rise Above	CD	UK	No	limited edition with sleeve and alt artwork version
2010	Rise Above	CD	UK	No	Standard jewel case edition
2010	Rise Above	LP	UK	Yes	Die Hard Edition – Deluxe boxed edition x 400 copies. Contains; Spot gloss box, Crypt of Drugula 16-page comic, embroidered patch, A1 Poster and double gatefold album on 180 gm black vinyl with full colour printed inners.
2010	Rise Above	LP	UK	Yes	X 400 Solid white, X 400 Transparent Green, X 400 Transparent Blue, X 400 Transparent Red,
2010	Rise Above	LP	UK	No	X 400 Solid Grey, X 500 White/Black two colour split.
