= Let Sleeping Corpses Lie (film) =

1974 horror film directed by Jorge Grau

- Spanish theatrical release film poster.
- Spanish: No profanar el sueño de los muertos
- Directed by: Jorge Grau
- Written by: Sandro Continenza; Marcello Coscia
- Produced by: Edmondo Amati
- Starring: Cristina Galbó; Ray Lovelock; Arthur Kennedy
- Cinematography: Francisco Sempere
- Edited by: Domingo García; Vincenzo Tomassi
- Music by: Giuliano Sorgini
- Production company: Star Films S.A.; Flaminia Produzioni Cinematografiche
- Distributed by: Mercurio Films S.A. (Spain); Fida Cinematografica (Italy)
- Release dates: 30 September 1974 (Sitges); 28 November 1974 (Italy); 20 October 1975 (Spain)
- Running time: 93 minutes
- Countries: Spain; Italy
- Language: English

Let Sleeping Corpses Lie (Italian: Non si deve profanare il sonno dei morti, Spanish: No profanar el sueño de los muertos, lit. 'Do Not Profane the Sleep of the Dead') is a 1974 zombie horror film directed by Jorge Grau, and starring Cristina Galbó, Ray Lovelock, and Arthur Kennedy. The plot follows two travelers who become implicated in murders in the Lake District committed by zombies who have been brought to life by a farming tool designed to kill insects via ultra-sonic radiation.

A co-production between Spain and Italy, Let Sleeping Corpses Lie premiered at the Sitges Film Festival on 30 September 1974, where it won awards for Best Actress (for Galbó) and Best Special Effects. Grau won the CEC Award for Best Director. The film was distributed internationally under approximately 15 alternative titles, notably The Living Dead at Manchester Morgue (United Kingdom), Don't Open the Window (United States), and Zombi 3: Da dove vieni? (Italy).

In the years since its release, the film has become a cult classic.

== Plot ==
George Meaning is taking a trip to the Lake District. However, Edna Simmons accidentally damages his motorbike while reversing her car at a petrol station. He demands that she give him a lift to his destination. Edna, planning to visit her sister Katie, wishes to visit Southgate first.

George and Edna eventually reach a dead end on a road while searching for Katie's house. George walks to a farm where men from the Ministry of Agriculture use an experimental machine. While asking for directions, he learns that their machinery is designed to kill insects through ultrasonic radiation. Meanwhile, while waiting at the car, Edna is attacked by a man who emerges from a river. She runs to find George for help, but her attacker is gone when they return to the car.

That night, Katie, who is addicted to heroin, awaits Edna's arrival. Katie's photographer husband, Martin, goes down to a waterfall near their remote cottage to complete a shoot of plant specimens. Left alone, Katie prepares to take heroin but is attacked by the same man who earlier attacked Edna. Katie is pursued to Martin's photo shoot. There, the man kills Martin, and Katie flees just as George and Edna arrive. When the three report the death, the police inspector suspects foul play by the trio. George is forced to stay in Southgate as a person of interest in the investigation. He secretly takes the roll of film from Martin's camera to a pharmacist to have it developed. Katie has a breakdown and is hospitalised. At the hospital, babies bite and scratch people with mysterious homicidal intensity.

George and Edna collect the photos, but Martin's killer does not appear in any of them; the man is actually a vagrant who had recently drowned in the river. The Inspector arrives and confiscates the photos. He later sends Constable Craig to follow the couple. They go to the graveyard and find a half-eaten meal in a room in the chapel. Following noises to a crypt, they come across the vagrant's empty coffin along with a murdered man. Locked in the crypt by someone, they again encounter the zombified vagrant, who brings the other bodies to life. The pair escapes up a ladder, kicking out a hole to climb into a freshly dug grave. Craig arrives and helps Edna and George out of the pit. The zombies pursue the trio into the church. They lock themselves in a room but are trapped there, with Craig finding that a gun is useless against the zombies. He makes a dash for the police radio he had dropped outside, but is caught by the zombies, who devour him.

The dead break into their room, and George throws a lit oil lamp at them. It smashes, and the zombies burst into flame. The two escape to their car, and Edna is sent to tell the police. George heads to the experimental machine, which is now working within a five-mile radius. The farmer and two Ministry of Agriculture employees, however, do not believe George, and he begins smashing the machine.

The Inspector finds Craig's and the caretaker's bodies and, believing that Edna and George may be Satanists and murderers, he issues orders "to shoot to kill." Edna arrives at her brother-in-law's farm and is met by the now-zombified Martin. Edna runs over him as she escapes. George finds Edna, drops her off at a petrol station, and leaves with a jerry can of fuel. George is eventually caught in a police trap, and Martin's body is taken back to the hospital.

In the farm field, the Ministry of Agriculture employees repair and re-activate the machine, which brings to life bodies in the hospital morgue. George escapes in a police car and learns that Edna is now in the hospital, where the zombies are killing people, including Katie and Edna.

George arrives and sets all the zombies on fire. He is eventually shot by the Inspector, who still does not believe in zombies. Returning to his hotel room for the night, the Inspector finds a zombified George waiting for him. In a field nearby, the machine continues working.

== Cast ==
- Cristina Galbó as Edna Simmonds
- Ray Lovelock as George Meaning
- Arthur Kennedy as the inspector
- Aldo Massasso as Detective Sgt. Kinsey
- Giorgio Trestini as Constable Craig
- Roberto Posse as Benson
- José Lifante as Martin West
- Jeannine Mestre as Katie West
- Gengher Gatti as Keith
- Fernando Hilbeck as Guthrie Wilson
- Vera Drudi as Mary
- Vicente Vega as Dr. Duffield
- Francisco Sanz as Perkins
- Paul Benson as Wood
- Anita Colby as nurse
- Joaquín Hinojosa as pathologist

== Production ==
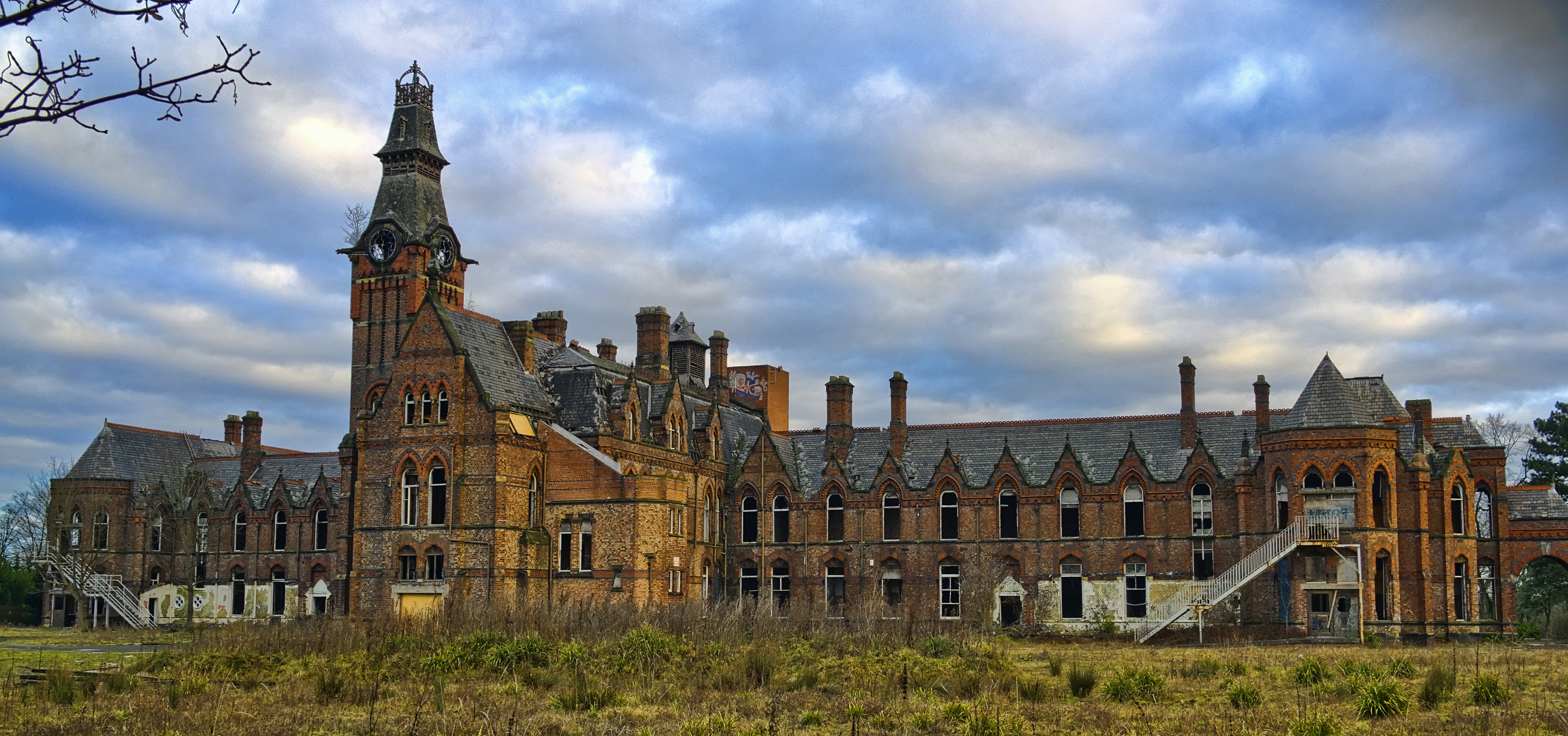
The Gothic Revival Barnes Hospital in Manchester

Filming took place on-location in North West England and Lazio, Italy, and at Cinecittà Studios. The scenes featuring the outside of the hospital were shot at Barnes Hospital in Cheadle, Greater Manchester. Some scenes were filmed in Cumbria and the Peak District in Derbyshire, not far from Sheffield, principally in Castleton which stands in for the fictional village of 'Southgate,' and the dramatic Winnats Pass, which has the church superimposed onto it. The church scenes were shot in Hathersage. The opening montage was filmed in Manchester city centre.

The special makeup effects were created by Giannetto De Rossi.

In the English version of the film, Ray Lovelock's voice was dubbed by John Steiner.

While there are claims that a scene in which a zombie eats an eyeball was filmed, no such scene exists in any surviving print of the film, according to the liner notes of the Blue Underground DVD release. During the scene in which Craig is eaten, the female zombie reaches down toward Craig's eyes, and it is visible that the right eye socket is already empty, then a seemingly sloppy edit cuts to a long shot of all the zombies feasting. It is part of the DVD Stephen Romano Presents Shock Festival, which was released on 8 January 2010 in the United States.

== Release ==
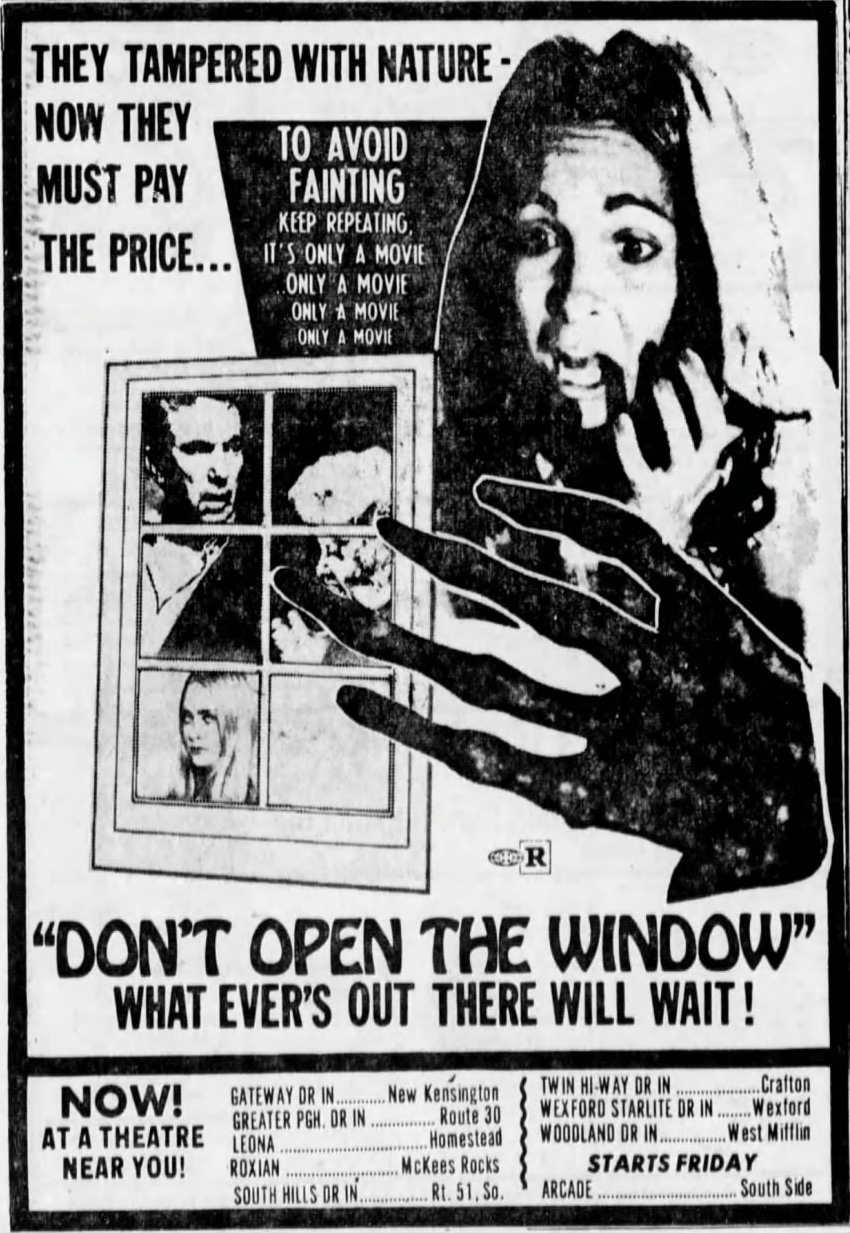
1976 American newspaper advertisement promoting the film under the alternative title Don't Open the Window

The film premiered in Spain on 30 September 1974, in Italy on 28 November 1974. It was released in the United Kingdom as The Living Dead at the Manchester Morgue through Miracle Films, despite the fact that the film takes place in Southgate, not Manchester. It began screening in London under this title on 9 March 1975.

It was released in United States in 1976 under the title Don't Open the Window, frequenting the drive-in circuits and cinemas. It was often paired as a double feature with The Last House on the Left (1972), Don't Look in the Basement (1973), and They Came From Within (1975). The film was also sometimes screened in the United States under the title Breakfast at the Manchester Morgue.

The film was subsequently reissued under varying titles; in total, it was released under at least 15 different titles internationally. In Italy, the film was reissued as Zombi 3: Da dove vieni?, marketed as being part of a series of films that were unofficially presented as sequels to George A. Romero's Dawn of the Dead (1978).

=== Home media ===
The film was released for the first time on video and DVD in the U.S. in 2000 by Anchor Bay Entertainment under the Let Sleeping Corpses Lie title. The DVD release was available in a standard edition as well as a limited edition collector's tin containing bonus film stills, a booklet of production notes, and a fake toe tag styled after the film. Both editions featured a foreword and extensive interview with director Jorge Grau.

After the Anchor Bay release of the film went out of print, the disc was re-released by Blue Underground in 2005. In 2008, Blue Underground released the film yet again, only this time in a special edition DVD and Blu-ray under the Living Dead at the Manchester Morgue title. On 27 June 2019, Synapse Films announced a Blu-ray release featuring a new 4K resolution scan of the original 35mm film negatives. It was released on 1 September 2020 in a limited steelbook edition of 6,000 units.

== Reception ==
From a contemporary review, Verina Glaessner of the Monthly Film Bulletin said the film was extremely close to Night of the Living Dead but praised the direction of Jorge Grau, referring to him as a "director with genuine talent for the macabre mood and unsettling detail"

Rotten Tomatoes, a review aggregator, reports that 86% of 21 surveyed critics gave the film a positive review; the average rating was 7.35/10. Writing in The Zombie Movie Encyclopedia, academic Peter Dendle called it "surprisingly effective" and said it has "perhaps the best zombies in a year of very good zombies". Zombiemania: 80 Movies to Die For author Arnold T. Blumberg said that the movie "manages to sustain interest thanks to a creepy droning soundtrack, some excellent suspenseful sequences and the requisite over-the-top gore," adding that the film "earns a place in zombie movie history by being one of the first to feature an onscreen gut-ripping feasting scene with zombies actually tearing into a living victim." Glenn Kay, who wrote Zombie Movies: The Ultimate Guide, said that it foreshadowed the later Italian zombie films of the 1980s. Kay called it "the most effective and disturbing Spanish film of the period".

== In popular culture ==
A sample of dialogue from the film appears in the track "Wizard in Black" by Electric Wizard on their 1997 album Come My Fanatics…. The band has also used the movie poster on merchandise. Later, the band included the track "The Living Dead at Manchester Morgue" on their album We Live (2004).

According to Edgar Wright, the promotion of the film during its exhibition in the United States was one of the inspirations for the fake trailer Don't, which appears in the 2007 release Grindhouse.

A song by the extreme metal group Carcass titled "The Living Dead at the Manchester Morgue", named after one of the film's English titles, was released on their 2020 Despicable EP.

The film's American title has been cited as the main inspiration for the name of the Edgar Wright short film, Don't.

== Sources ==
- Blumberg, Arnold (2006). Zombiemania: 80 Movies to Die For. Cantebury, Kent: Telos Publishing. ISBN 978-1-845-83003-8.
- Craig, Rob (2019). American International Pictures: A Comprehensive Filmography. Jefferson, North Carolina: McFarland & Company. ISBN 978-1-476-66631-0.
- Curti, Roberto (2017). Riccardo Freda: The Life and Works of a Born Filmmaker. Jefferson, North Carolina: McFarland & Company. ISBN 978-1-476-62838-7.
- Dendle, Peter (2001). The Zombie Movie Encyclopedia. Jefferson, North Carolina: McFarland & Company. ISBN 978-0-7864-9288-6.
- Kay, Glenn (2008). Zombie Movies: The Ultimate Guide. Chicago, Illinois: Chicago Review Press. ISBN 978-1-55652-770-8.
- Kushner, Tony (2006). Remembering Refugees: Then and Now. Manchester University Press. ISBN 978-0-719-06883-6.
- Labanyi, Jo; Pavlović, Tatjana (2015). A Companion to Spanish Cinema. New York City, New York: Wiley. ISBN 978-1-119-17013-6.
- Marriott, David; Newman, Kim (2006). Horror: The Definitive Guide to the Cinema of Fear. London, England: André Deutsch. ISBN 978-0-233-00201-9.
