= Eko Eko Azarak =

Opening phrase from a Wiccan chant

Eko Eko Azarak is the opening phrase from a Wiccan chant. It is also known as the "Witch's chant", the "Witch's rune", or the "Eko Eko chant". The following form was used by Gerald Gardner, considered as the founder of Wicca as an organized, contemporary religion.

The Eko Eko chant appeared in his 1949 occult novel, High Magic's Aid. In Chapter XVII, it was used in first-degree initiation.

Eko, eko, azarak. Eko, eko, zomelak.
Bagabi lacha bachabe, Lamac cahi achababe.

Karrellyos.

Lamac lamac bachalyas.
Cabahagy sabalyos. Baryolos.
Lagoz atha cabyolas. Smnahac atha famolas.

Hurrahya.

Another variant of the chant expanded the Eko, eko opening to four lines, using these words to salute various Wiccan deities, typically Cernunnos and Aradia. Other combinations include Karnayna and Aradia, Hern and Hecate, Osiris and Isis, and Kernunnos and Arida.

By the mid-1980s, there were many versions of the Eko Eko chant used by Wiccans, some with alternate spellings for Azarak and Zomelak.

== Sources ==
There are two sources for the text Gardner used to make this chant.

The opening lines, with their repeated Eko eko refrain, apparently come from an article published in a 1921 edition of the journal Form by J. F. C. Fuller, on "The Black Arts", reprinted in The Occult Review in April 1926, though "The Occult Review" 1923 is frequently mis-cited. See Hutton's sources. Fuller's version goes:

Eko! Eko! Azarak! Eko! Eko! Zomelak!
Zod-ru-koz e Zod-ru-koo
Zod-ru-goz e Goo-ru-moo!
Eko! Eko! Hoo...Hoo...Hoo!

Fuller gives no source for this spell.

In Eight Sabbats for Witches (1981), the Janet and Stewart Farrar provided a version of the Eko Eko chant which they received from Doreen Valiente.

Eko Eko Azarak
Eko Eko Zomelak
Zod ru koz e zod ru koo
Zod ru goz e goo ru moo
Eeo Eeo hoo hoo hoo!

In private correspondence to the Farrars, Valiente explained that this was the version Gardner had given to her.

The second source is a thirteenth-century French miracle play, Le Miracle de Théophile, by the trouvère Rutebeuf. The original text from the French play is given to the character Salatin — apparently a version of Saladin — who in this play is labelled a sorcerer; Salatin uses these words to invoke the Devil:

(Ci conjure Salatins le deable.)

Bagahi laca bachahé,
Lamac cahi achabahé,

Karrelyos.

Lamac lamec bachalyos,
Cabahagi sabalyos,

Baryolas.

Lagozatha cabyolas,
Samahac et famyolas,

Harrahya.

== Interpretations ==
The meaning of the source texts is unclear. Pennethorne Hughes, in his 1952 monograph on Witchcraft, claimed that the text from Le Miracle de Théophile is a garbled version of a Basque language original. Michael Harrison, in The Roots of Witchcraft, attempted to give a more specific interpretation of the entire chant in Basque; his translation has the chant speak of flying through the air, sacrifice, feasting and drinking, and then washing the dishes. Victor Anderson, the blind poet and founder of the Feri Tradition, claimed that Eko is Basque, meaning "here is". According to Raven Grimassi, some Wiccans believe that the chant is an invocation of the forces of the four elements.

== In popular culture ==
The Eko Eko chant is well enough known outside of Wicca proper to provide the title of a manga, also adapted into a TV series and several live-action films, Eko Eko Azarak (エコエコアザラク), also known by the title Wizard of Darkness. Electric Wizard, a doom metal band from England, recorded a song called "Eko Eko Azarak" on their 2004 album We Live.The chant also appears at the start of the album Barathrum V.I.T.R.I.O.L by black metal band Absu. A variation of the chant was also featured in the 1971 Doctor Who serial The Dæmons, and Shelley Winters' character, Mrs. Erica Hunter, uses the phrase "Eko Eko Azarak" in a ceremony in the 1978 TV movie The Initiation of Sarah. It is also used in the 1985 movie Howling II: Your Sister Is a Werewolf. British band Cloven Hoof used the phrase in the lyrics of their eponymous song "Cloven Hoof." The chant is used in scenes depicting Wiccan ceremonies the 2016 film The Love Witch.

== See also ==
- Magical formula
- Mantra
