= Wizard Bloody Wizard =

Studio album by Electric Wizard
- Released: 17 November 2017
- Recorded: April 2016 – February 2017
- Studio: Satyr IX Recording Studio
- Genre: Doom metal
- Length: 43:04
- Labels: Spinefarm; Witchfinder
- Producers: Jus Oborn; Liz Buckingham

Electric Wizard chronology
| Time to Die (2014) | Wizard Bloody Wizard (2017) |

Singles from Wizard Bloody Wizard
- 1. "See You in Hell" Released: 2017

Wizard Bloody Wizard is the ninth studio album by English doom metal band Electric Wizard, released on 17 November 2017, three years after their previous album Time to Die. Recording took place from April 2016 to February 2017 at the Satyr IX Recording Studios with production duties on the album shared between lead singer Jus Oborn and guitarist Liz Buckingham. Though some music critics noted an overall change in the band's sound from their usual doom formula towards a slightly more hard rock approach, the album received generally favourable reviews. With a running time of 43 minutes and consisting of only six songs, Wizard Bloody Wizard is the band's shortest studio album to date.

== Album cover ==
Credit for the album cover photography is given to guitarist Liz Buckingham with A. Bastlanello given modelling credit. Echoing the band's fondness for the macabre, Blabbermouth described the cover as "A sick and twisted bad taste eye-assault that aims to titillate, excite and repulse you." While there are none of the familiar horror movie sound bites between songs as previously employed by the band on past albums, Oborn cited horror movies such as The Last House on the Left as inspiration for the album's cover art, stating:

"It's a homage to some exploitation movies... but not very nice ones, to be honest, ha ha ha! We like to push people's buttons if we can. Sex and violence are our basest instincts, I guess we think that engaging the brain and guts on this most basic, primal level is the fastest way to grab people's emotions… It's 'shock' tactics, but the world is so fuckin' brainwashed or bored that they need to be 'woken up'. The 'man' is slowly neutering and killing us with technology and lies… It's time to fight back."

— (Jus Oborn)

== Recording ==
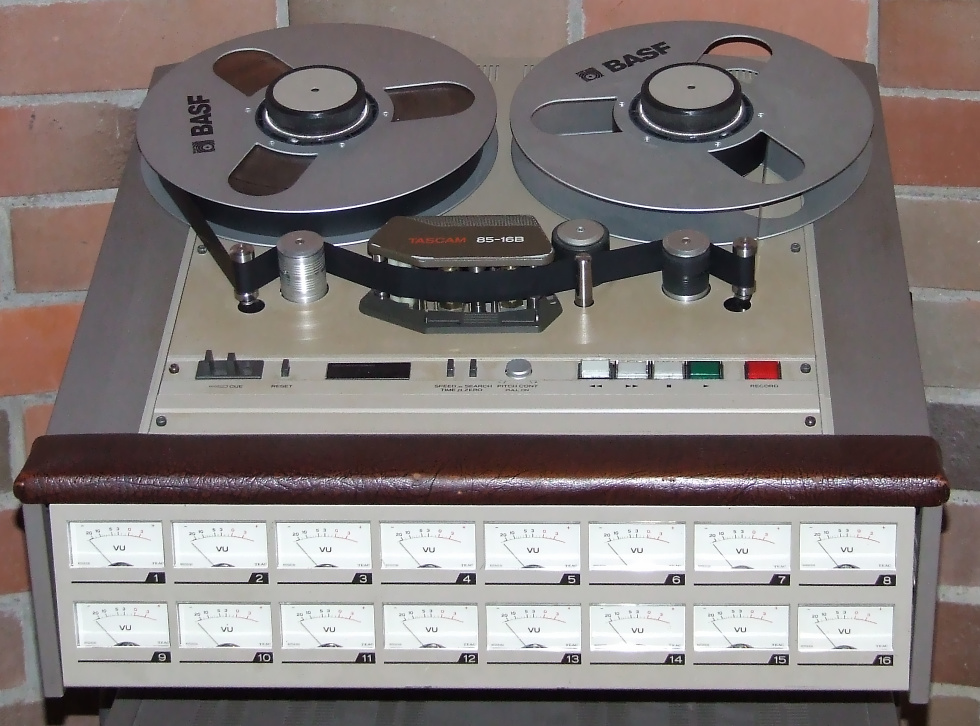
A TASCAM 85 16B analog tape recorder as used by the band

In a 2017 interview with It's Psychedelic Baby! Magazine, Jus Oborn touched on the recording process, stating that some members of the band were in the process of moving home during this period and as such, different songs were recorded in various places, the bulk of which was completed at what became their personalized home studio – Satyr IX. Describing the different tools used during recording. Oborn stated "It was all recorded with the same gear tho'... a Tascam 16-track tape machine, Mackie desk, Neve preamp, Watkins Copicat delay, Roland Space Echo, and a couple of other reverbs and compressors. It's really a very simple set-up as we wanted to keep the signal path from band to tape as short as possible... y'know to keep it as raw as possible."

Production on the album was handled by Oborn and Liz Buckingham, with Oborn also taking care of the mixing. The band went to extensive lengths to achieve a raw analog sound by, as stated, keeping the signal path from band to tape as short as possible and also recording using dated equipment, most notably the 16 track recorder. Oborn noted "All the gear is old and a bit temperamental. Things tend to break unexpectedly in the middle of recording, or even just stop working for no reason and then start working again in a few days/weeks. It was really frustrating. I guess the most temperamental and delicate machine was the 16 track recorder... and the hardest to get repaired. At one point the LP had to be shelved for six months while we tried to sort out the tape machine."

== Composition ==
"Necromania"
Critics noted a distinct change in the album's overall sound, with some describing a slight shift towards hard rock type qualities.

Wizard Bloody Wizard consists of only six songs, the shortest of which, "The Reaper", clocks in at 3:17. The longest song on the album, "Mourning of the Magicians", in a more traditional Electric Wizard style has a running time of 11:18 bringing the total length to 43:04. While still maintaining their trademark doom metal approach, some critics noted a distinct change in the band's sound when compared with previous efforts. The most obvious of which was their hard rock approach via their doom metal beginnings as mentioned in a CVLT Nation review.

In a Blabbermouth.net article published prior to the album's release, the magazine stated "...the band sounds together — really together. The last three years of touring, writing and rehearsing have honed and moulded a new sound that has truly distilled the Electric Wizard brew. In forty-three brain-damaging minutes, the band delivers a varied, challenging and breath-taking LP, from crushing blues stomp through savage Detroit sleaze rock, paranoiac passages of droning drug rock and creepy funereal proto-metal/acidrock."

Discussing the album's lyrical content in the October 2017 issue of Metal Hammer, Jus Oborn remarked. "The lyrics cover the same sort of subjects as usual, it's all necrophilia, drug-abuse and satanism. I like to tick all the boxes." On their official website, the band described the album as "43 brain-damaging minutes, six savage hymns to death, drugs, sex and violence, music dragged (and drugged) back from the grave… The line is drawn. In blood."

== Reception ==
Professional ratings
Aggregate scores
| Source | Rating |
|---|---|
| Metacritic | 74/100 |
Review scores
| Source | Rating |
| AllMusic | 3.5/5 stars |
| Clash | 7/10 |
| Kerrang! | 4/5 stars |
| Metal Hammer | 3/5 stars |
| Metal Injection | 6.5/10 |
| MetalSucks | 3/5 stars |
| Mojo | 4/5 stars |
| Q | 3/5 stars |
| Record Collector | 4/5 stars |
| Slant Magazine | 3.5/5 stars |

The album was released to generally favourable reviews scoring 74 on aggregate website Metacritic, based on 13 reviews. Team Rock gave the album 3 out of 5 stars and reviewer Dom Lawson said of the album "if you compare this to past triumphs like Come My Fanatics... and Dopethrone – albums that pushed doom metal into heavier and more joyously drug-addled territory than ever before – Wizard Bloody Wizard falls a spliff or two short of the mark."

Josh Gray of Clash noted the band's paying homage to Black Sabbath's Sabbath Bloody Sabbath in selection of the album's title but pointed out the absurdity of the tribute; "Sabbath Bloody Sabbath is by far Black Sabbath's most experimental album," he said, "while this record is by far Electric Wizard's least." He further suggested that this album may be the one (as opposed to Dopethrone) you play to demonstrate Electric Wizard's distinctive sound to an uninitiated friend. Touching on the band's less abrasive approach, Gray said "Despite ominous lyrics about black magic and copulating demons (not to mention 'The Reaper's suitably spooky organs), you can't really describe Wizard Bloody Wizard as doom metal. It feels like, after the heartbreak and lineup changes of 2014's gloomy Time To Die, the band have simply had too much fun making the kind of music they love this time around to plum their grimmer side any further. Doubtless this will piss off a swathe of their fans (AKA the ones whose band t-shirts are genuinely illegible), but it might well win them a new host of fans more partial to Era Vulgaris than Epicus Doomicus."

After giving the album 3.5 stars out of 5, AllMusic critic Mark Deming went on to say "Wizard Bloody Wizard doesn't break any new ground for this band, but innovation has never been what these folks are about. Instead, their albums are offerings to the gods of the blacklight poster and the bong, and on that level, Electric Wizard appear to have made their masters very happy indeed." Slant Magazine's Zachary Hoskins also gave the album 3.5 out of 5 and noted the band's particular nod to Black Sabbath's Master of Reality on the album saying "For those headbanging purists, however, whose teeth are set on edge by the word "prog" (or "dynamics"), fear not: Wizard Bloody Wizard remains firmly in Master of Reality territory. The album does present some subtle tweaks to the doom-metal formula: The churning, throbbing "Necromania" introduces an element of punk sneer to the proceedings, channeling Ron Asheton-era Stooges, while "The Reaper" drips with psychedelic menace. But for the most part, this is monolithic riff-rock straight out of the Sabbath playbook."

== Track listing ==
All tracks are written by Jus Oborn, Liz Buckingham, and Simon Poole.

| No. | Title | Length |
|---|---|---|
| 1. | "See You in Hell" | 6:41 |
| 2. | "Necromania" | 6:16 |
| 3. | "Hear the Sirens Scream" | 8:47 |
| 4. | "The Reaper" | 3:17 |
| 5. | "Wicked Caresses" | 6:45 |
| 6. | "Mourning of the Magicians" | 11:18 |
| Total length: | | 43:04 |

== Personnel ==
=== Electric Wizard ===
- Jus Oborn – guitar, vocals
- Liz Buckingham – guitar
- Simon Poole – drums
- Clayton Burgess – bass

=== Technical and design personnel ===
- Chris Fielding – technical assistance
- Simon Heyworth – mastering
- Garrett Morris – engineer
- Miguel Pinheiro – album photography
- Liz Buckingham – cover image

== Charts ==
| Chart (2017) | Peak position |
|---|---|
| Finnish Albums (Suomen virallinen lista) | 35 |
