= Chrono.Naut / Nuclear Guru =

EP (split) by Electric Wizard and Orange Goblin
- Released: 9 January 1998
- Genre: Doom metal; stoner metal
- Length: 30:55
- Label: Man's Ruin

Electric Wizard chronology
Chrono.Naut (1997)	Chrono.Naut / Nuclear Guru (1998)	Supercoven (1998)

Orange Goblin chronology
Nuclear Guru (1997)	Chrono.Naut / Nuclear Guru (1997)	Time Travelling Blues (1998)

Orange Goblin cover

Professional ratings
Review scores
Source	Rating
AllMusic	1.5/5 stars

Chrono.Naut / Nuclear Guru is a split EP featuring English heavy metal bands Electric Wizard and Orange Goblin, re-releasing Chrono.Naut and Nuclear Guru on CD, which had both previously been released separately on vinyl in 1997. It is the second split release to feature the two bands, the first of which was in 1995.

== Track listing ==
=== Electric Wizard ===
1. "Chrono.Naut / Chrono.Naut Phase II" – 17:06

=== Orange Goblin ===
1. "Nuclear Guru" – 6:47
2. "Hand of Doom" (Black Sabbath) – 7:02

== Personnel ==
=== Electric Wizard ===
- Jus Oborn – guitar, vocals
- Tim Bagshaw – bass
- Mark Greening – drums

=== Orange Goblin ===
- Ben Ward – guitar, vocals
- Pete O'Malley – guitar
- Martyn Millard – bass
- Chris Turner – drums
