= Chrono.Naut =

EP by Electric Wizard
- Released: 1997
- Genres: Doom metal; stoner metal
- Length: 17:06
- Labels: Man's Ruin; Rise Above Music
- Producers: Jus Oborn; Paul Johnson

Electric Wizard chronology
Come My Fanatics... (1997)	Chrono.Naut (1997)	Chrono.Naut/Nuclear Guru (1997)

Chrono.Naut is an EP by the stoner/doom metal band Electric Wizard. It was originally released on LP in 1997 through Man's Ruin Records. It was then re-released on CD later that year as a split with Orange Goblin. The re-release features different artwork and the two songs bridged together.

An early version of the song was recorded by Jus Oborn's band Eternal, and appears on their demo Lucifer's Children (1993). The demo appears in full on the compilation album Pre-Electric Wizard 1989-1994.

== Release ==
Chrono.Naut was released on October 10, 1997. "Chrono.Naut" was later released as the split single Chrono.Naut/Nuclear Guru on Man's Ruin Records on March 8, 1998.

== Track listing ==
1. "Chrono.Naut" – 6:47
2. "Chrono.Naut Phase II: Chaos Revealed" – 10:59

== Personnel ==
- Jus Oborn – guitar, vocals
- Tim Bagshaw – bass
- Mark Greening – drums
- All lyrics – Jus Oborn
- All music – Electric Wizard
