= Let Us Prey =

Studio album by Electric Wizard
- Released: 25 March 2002
- Genre: Doom metal; stoner metal
- Length: 43:51
- Label: Rise Above; JVC Victor (Japan); The Music Cartel (US); Candlelight (US reissue)
- Producer: Jus Oborn and John Stephens

Electric Wizard chronology
Dopethrone (2000)	Let Us Prey (2002)	We Live (2004)

Original LP Cover
- The Music Cartel LP version

Repress LP Cover
- Rise Above 2LP version

Professional ratings
Review scores
Source	Rating
AllMusic	3.5/5 stars

Let Us Prey is the fourth studio album by English stoner/doom metal band Electric Wizard. It was released through Rise Above Records in 2002 and was the last album to feature Electric Wizard's original line-up. After its release, Tim Bagshaw and Mark Greening went on to form Ramesses.

The vinyl edition was originally pressed by The Music Cartel on a single LP. Rise Above later reissued the vinyl version as a 2LP with a bonus track, "Mother of Serpents". This track also appears on the Japanese version of the album as well as the CD reissues on both Rise Above and Candlelight Records.

== Musical style ==
Let Us Prey was a continuation of the more abrasive doom metal sound of their previous album, Dopethrone. It featured more experimentation and guitar layering on some songs. It is also unusual because it is much shorter (43 minutes and 51 seconds) than other Electric Wizard albums (with the exception of their eponymous debut album and Wizard Bloody Wizard), and does not include printed lyrics, making them difficult to decipher.

Speaking to Kerrang! in July 2009, Jus Oborn remembered:

"I think that was our Genesis record. We were all just about the studio, and we wanted to create music using the studio. We were really into the idea of recording then, this pretty technical album. We wanted to be experimental, like trying out some horror movie type stuff, just to see how it works. Each song was like an idea, we didn't write it. We just got an idea, and went with that for how we wanted that to sound."

== Track listing ==
=== Original ===
All lyrics are written by Jus Oborn; all music is composed by Electric Wizard.

No.	Title	Length
1.	"...A Chosen Few"	6:35
2.	"We, the Undead"	4:29
3.	"Master of Alchemy": "I. House of Whipcord"; "II. The Black Drug"	9:23
4.	"The Outsider"	9:19
5.	"Night of the Shape"	4:03
6.	"Priestess of Mars"	10:01

=== Bonus song on Japanese version and reissues ===
No.	Title	Length
7.	"Mother of Serpents"	5:56

== Personnel ==
=== Electric Wizard ===
- Jus Oborn – guitar, vocals
- Tim Bagshaw – bass
- Mark Greening – drums, piano

=== Additional personnel ===
- Paul Sax – violin on "Night of the Shape"
- Stephen O'Malley – artwork

== Release history ==
Year	Label	Format	Country	Out of print?	Notes
2002	Rise Above	CD	U.K.	Yes	Original CD release
2002	JVC Victor	CD	Japan	Yes	Includes bonus track
2002	The Music Cartel	CD	U.S.	Yes	
2002	The Music Cartel	LP	U.S.	Yes	Features slightly different cover art
2006	Rise Above	2LP	U.K.	Yes	Includes bonus track; features slightly different cover art; limited 1100 copies (100 clear; 500 deep red; 500 black)
2006	Rise Above	DigiCD	U.K.	No	Remastered version; includes bonus track
2008	Candlelight	DigiCD	U.S.	No	Remastered version; includes bonus track
