= Time to Die (Electric Wizard album) =

Studio album by Electric Wizard
- Released: 29 September 2014 (UK); 30 September 2014 (US)
- Genres: Doom metal; stoner metal
- Length: 65:26
- Label: Spinefarm
- Producer: Jus Oborn

Electric Wizard chronology
Black Masses (2010)	Time to Die (2014)	Wizard Bloody Wizard (2017)

Professional ratings
Aggregate scores
Source	Rating
Metacritic	83/100
Review scores
Source	Rating
AllMusic	3/5 stars
Drowned in Sound	8/10
The Guardian	4/5 stars
Kerrang!	5/5 stars
Metal Hammer	4.5/5 stars
MetalSucks	4.5/5 stars
Mojo	4/5 stars
NME	8/10
Pitchfork	7.9/10
Record Collector	4/5 stars

Time to Die is the eighth studio album by English stoner/doom metal band Electric Wizard, released on 29 September 2014. It is their debut on Spinefarm, having left Rise Above. The album is the first since 2002's Let Us Prey to feature founding member Mark Greening on drums.

The album is the longest Electric Wizard studio album to date (excluding bonus tracks and the added silence at the end of Dopethrone).

== Track listing ==
All tracks are written by Jus Oborn and Liz Buckingham, except where noted.

No.	Title	Writer(s)	Length
1.	"Incense for the Damned"		10:42
2.	"Time to Die"		7:49
3.	"I Am Nothing"		11:31
4.	"Destroy Those Who Love God"	Oborn, Mark Greening	3:14
5.	"Funeral of Your Mind"		7:08
6.	"We Love the Dead"	Oborn, Buckingham, Greening	9:05
7.	"SadioWitch"		4:10
8.	"Lucifer's Slaves"		8:40
9.	"Saturn Dethroned"	Oborn, Greening	3:07
Total length:			65:26

== Personnel ==
=== Electric Wizard ===
- Jus Oborn – guitars, vocals, bass
- Liz Buckingham – guitars
- Mark Greening – drums, Hammond organ

=== Guest musicians ===
- Count Orlof – bass

=== Production ===
- Chris Fielding – mixing
- Jus Oborn – production

== Charts ==
Chart (2014)	Peak position
Belgian Albums (Ultratop Wallonia)	86
Finnish Albums (Suomen virallinen lista)	14
French Albums (SNEP)	148
UK Rock & Metal Albums (Official Charts Company)	5
US Billboard 200	64
US Independent Albums (Billboard)	10
US Top Rock Albums (Billboard)	16
