= Barnes Hospital, Cheadle =

Former hospital in Greater Manchester, England

Barnes Hospital
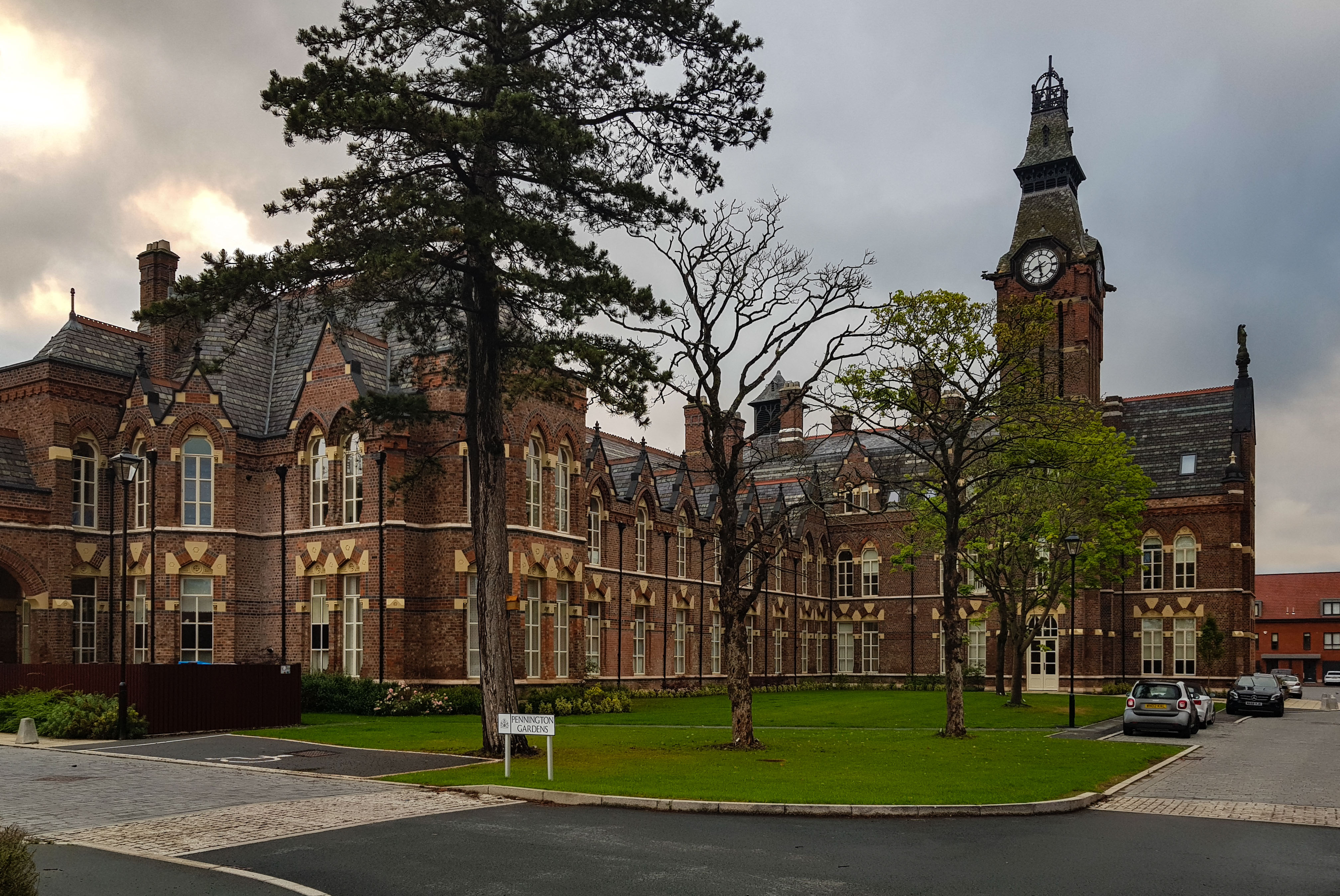
- The restored and redeveloped hospital in 2020

- Location within Greater Manchester
- Former names: Barnes Convalescent Home

General information
- Status: Converted into apartments
- Type: Former hospital
- Architectural style: French Gothic Revival
- Location: Cheadle, Greater Manchester, England
- Coordinates: 53°23′50″N 2°13′24.7″W
- Construction started: 1871
- Completed: 1875
- Renovated: 1893, 1945

Design and construction
- Architect: Lawrence Booth
- Designations

Listed Building – Grade II
- Official name: Barnes Hospital
- Designated: 12 November 1999
- Reference no.: 1379609

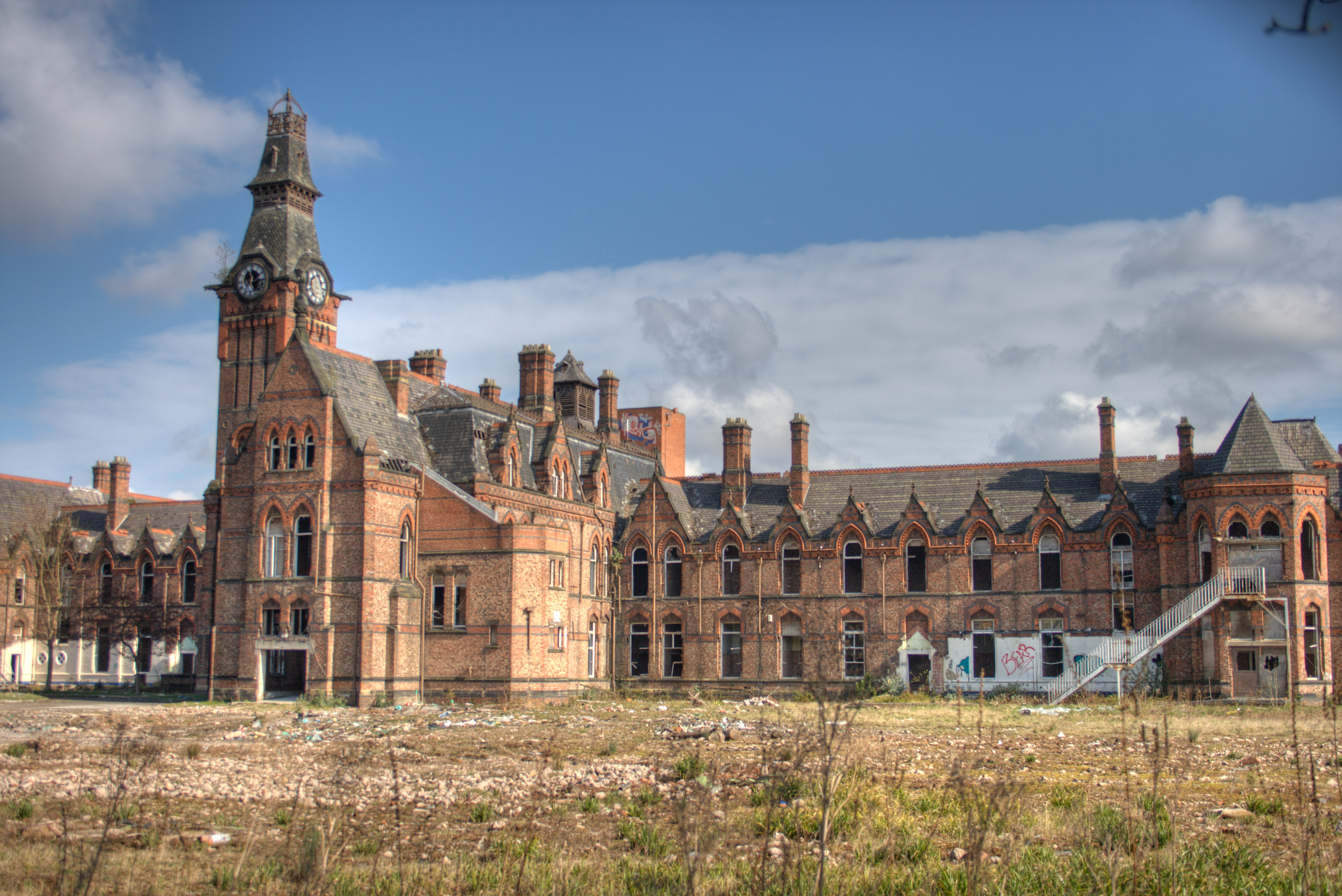
The main building of Barnes Hospital during dereliction in 2008

Barnes Hospital in Cheadle, Greater Manchester, England, is a former hospital. It is on the border between Manchester and Stockport, near the A34 road in the middle of the complex interchange between Kingsway, the M60 and M56 motorway. The main building is Grade II listed, and lies on green belt land.

The building, completed in 1875, is a noted example of Victorian Gothic Revival architecture and a prominent landmark, sitting on a mount overlooking the surrounding roads. The hospital closed in 1999, and although the building was promptly listed to protect it from demolition, it became derelict.

The former hospital building has now been converted into flats and is at the centre of a new housing development called Barnes Village.

== History ==
Following the improvements to nursing inspired by the work of Florence Nightingale in the 1860s, demand for convalescent care grew in the British hospital system. The philanthropist Joseph Adshead campaigned for the construction of a convalescent hospital in Manchester; after his death in 1861, Manchester Royal Infirmary rented Cheadle Hall, to the south of the city, for use as a convalescent hospital. The rural location was selected as a recuperating atmosphere away from the industrial smog of Manchester. The site is now surrounded by major roads on all sides.

A donation of £10,000 for the founding of a new convalescent hospital in Cheadle was made in 1869 by Robert Barnes, a local Wesleyan philanthropist, to purchase land for the construction of a new convalescent home. Barnes has had made his fortune in the Manchester cotton trade and had served as mayor of Manchester from 1851 to 1853. He made a further contribution to the project, bringing his total gift to the hospital construction to £26,000. Another donor, Humphrey Nicholls, gave £10,000. Barnes was also the main benefactor of Barnes's House of Recovery in Monsall, north Manchester, later known as Monsall Hospital.

Construction of the Barnes Convalescent Home in Cheadle started in 1871 and was completed in 1875. It was constructed of bricks, the clay for which was provided locally. There were 132 beds. During construction of the hospital, broken remains of three stone high crosses were discovered in 1874. The location of only one of these is known today; this consists of a crosshead of Celtic cross form with a central boss, and dates from the late 10th or 11th century. It is now located in St Mary's Church, Cheadle. The other two pieces are said to be part of a much older cross, and the upper part of an Anglo-Saxon cross shaft.

The hospital lost several thousand pounds a year and had to be subsidized by Manchester Royal Infirmary, but in 1925 the trustees accepted that this enabled more patients to be admitted to the main hospital. Electricity and a mains water supply were installed in that year. When an orthopaedic department was established at the infirmary many long-stay patients were cared for at Barnes. Lifts, a surgical theatre, an X-ray department, a physiotherapy gym and occupational therapy department were established.

During World War II the hospital was used as a convalescent home for wounded soldiers. The hospital operated through the war caring for injured soldiers and taking in traumas. On the same site of Barnes Hospital there was also a fever hospital where patients with tuberculosis and yellow fever were treated in isolation wards. The main use for the hospital in its later life was for geriatric care and stroke patients. It was estimated the hospital treated tens of thousands of patients over its 115 years as a convalescent home.

It closed in September 1999 while Central Manchester Healthcare NHS Trust was undergoing a £2 million cost cut. In the same year, the hospital received Grade II listed status. Following its closure the hospital temporarily housed a large group of refugees from Kosovo. The site was briefly occupied by around 100 Romani families in February 2007.

The hospital was sold in 2001, and was for a number of years owned by Realty Estates who allowed the listed building to fall into a state of dereliction. It was later sold to the Irish property development group Benmore for a sum estimated to be around £12 million. The company proposed a new 128 residential unit development around the hospital building but it was never proposed to the planning authority.

== Architecture ==
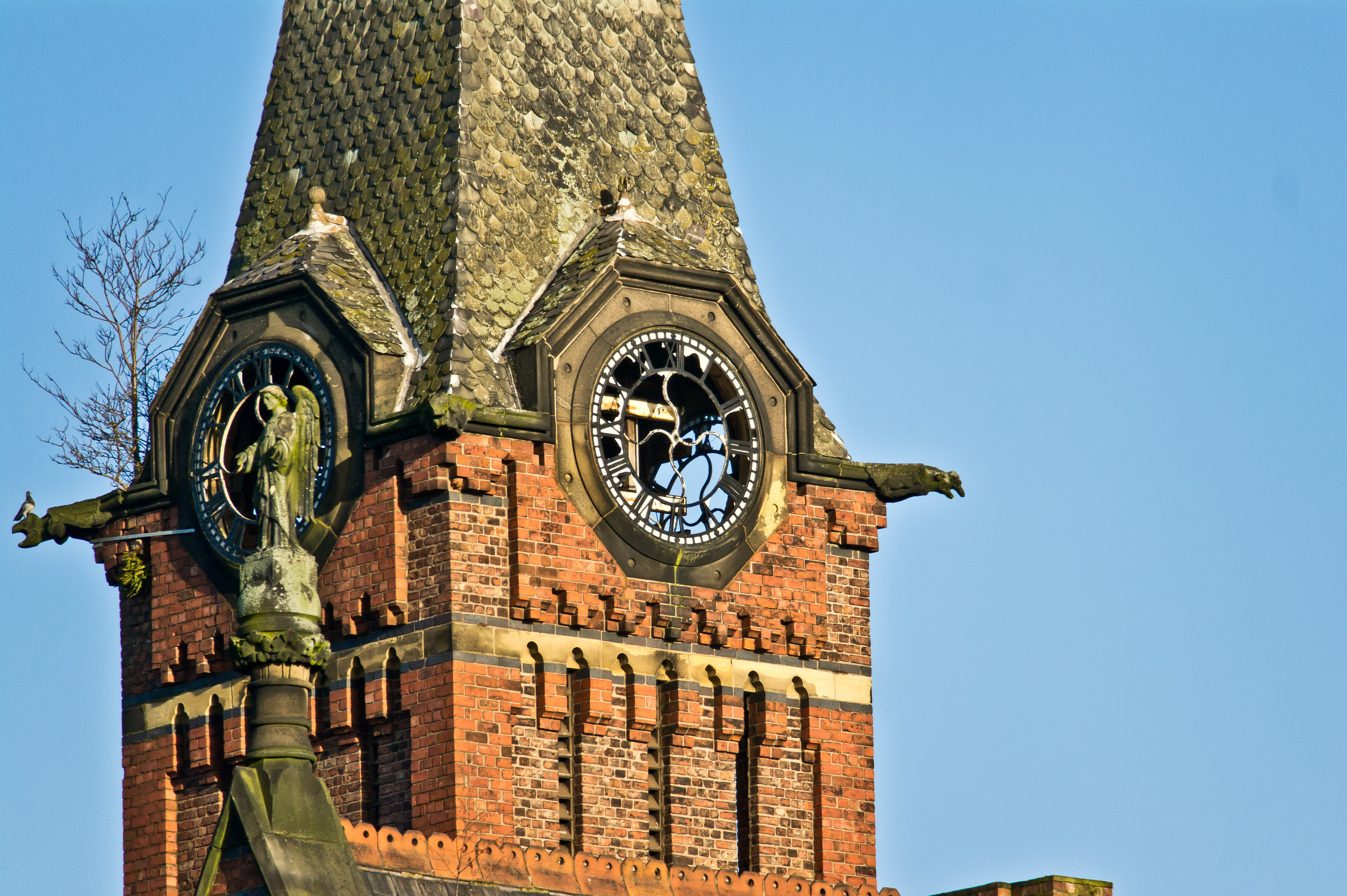
Detail of the dilapidated Barnes Hospital clock tower (pictured 2011)

The Barnes Convalescent Hospital was built for the Manchester Royal Infirmary between 1871 and 1875 by Lawrence Booth of the architecture firm of Blackwell, Son and Booth of Bury and Manchester. It is noted for its architectural distinctiveness and as an early example of a purpose-built convalescent hospital. The building was designed on a cruciform plan in the French Gothic Revival style, constructed of red brick and blue brick with ashlar and terracotta dressings, and the roofs are covered with Welsh slate. The building was richly decorated with ornamental brickwork, pointed arched and mullioned windows, decorative ridge tiles. On the western side is the building's main landmark, the tall clock tower, with clock faces on each side and a high two-stage lantern roof topped with an ornamental iron crown. Alterations to the building were carried out in 1893 by Pennington & Bridgen, and again in 1939-45 by Thomas Worthington & Son, both Mancunian architects' firms.

Barnes Hospital was not given a lengthy description in Nikolaus Pevsner's architectural guide, The Buildings of England; Pevsner simply described the building as "large, Gothic and grim". In its state of dereliction, the building has been described as a "great gaunt pile of a building, abandoned and all dark at night, except for the lonely light in its tower-top clock."

== Filming location ==
Barnes Hospital was used as one of a number of filming locations by the Spanish director Jorge Grau for his 1974 horror film, Let Sleeping Corpses Lie, otherwise known as The Living Dead at Manchester Morgue. Grau's careful choice of locations was praised by critics for its depiction of England as "a very bleak place indeed, full of sinister quietness", and he emphasised the sense of Gothic decay in Barnes Hospital to create the fictional Manchester Morgue.

In September 2005, the Barnes Hospital building was featured on the paranormal reality television series, Most Haunted Live.

== Redevelopment ==
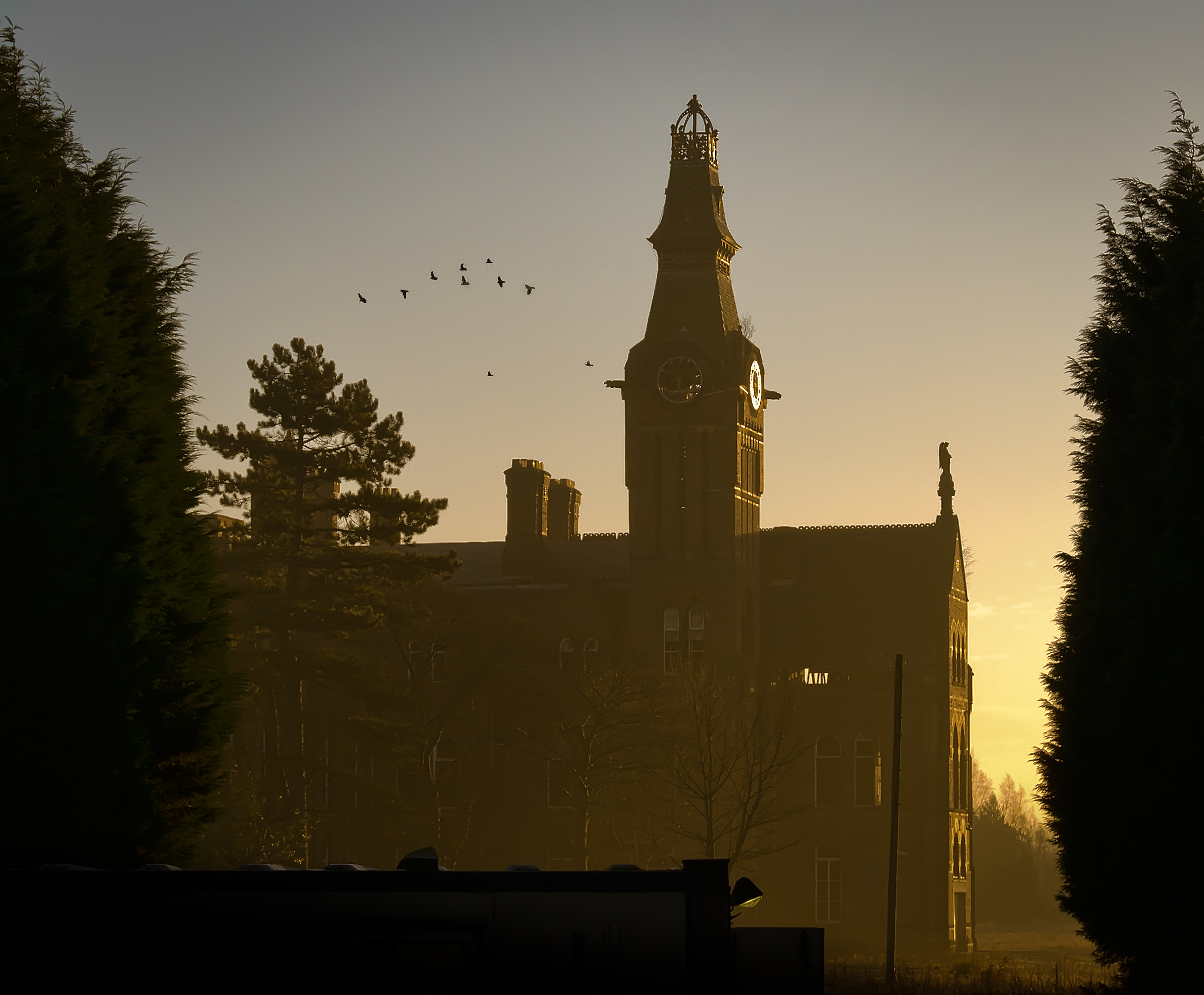
Barnes Hospital during sunrise in January 2011

A redevelopment on the site, including the conversion of the hospital into apartments, commenced on site in 2015. The development is known as Barnes Village.

== See also ==
- Listed buildings in Cheadle and Gatley
- Healthcare in Greater Manchester
- List of hospitals in England

== Bibliography ==
- Kushner, Tony (2006). Remembering Refugees: Then and Now. Manchester University Press. ISBN 0719068835.
