= Electric Wizard/Our Haunted Kingdom =

EP (split) by Electric Wizard and Our Haunted Kingdom
- Released: 1996
- Genre: Stoner metal
- Length: 10:19
- Label: Rise Above Records

Electric Wizard chronology
Electric Wizard (1994)	Electric Wizard/Our Haunted Kingdom (1996)	Come My Fanatics... (1997)

Orange Goblin chronology
Aquatic Fanatic (1996)	Frequencies from Planet Ten (1997)

Our Haunted Kingdom cover

Electric Wizard/Our Haunted Kingdom is a split-single released by the English stoner metal bands Electric Wizard and Our Haunted Kingdom, the latter of which changed their name to Orange Goblin after this release. It was released during 1996 on 7" vinyl through Rise Above Records.

- The Electric Wizard song, "Demon Lung", later appeared as a bonus track on a remastered version of their album Come My Fanatics....
- The Our Haunted Kingdom song, "Aquatic Fanatic", later appeared on their debut album Frequencies from Planet Ten, after they became Orange Goblin.
- The band Black Widow from England appears on the cover art.

== Track listing ==
=== Electric Wizard ===
1. "Demon Lung" – 5:52

=== Our Haunted Kingdom ===
1. "Aquatic Fanatic" – 4:27

== Personnel ==
=== Electric Wizard ===
- Jus Oborn – guitar, vocals
- Tim Bagshaw – bass
- Mark Greening – drums

=== Our Haunted Kingdom ===
- Ben Ward – guitar, vocals
- Pete O'Malley – guitar
- Martyn Millard – bass
- Chris Turner – drums
