= Pre-Electric Wizard 1989–1994 =

Compilation album by Electric Wizard
- Released: 2006
- Recorded: 1991–1993
- Genre: Doom metal, death-doom
- Length: 73:13
- Label: Rise Above; Candlelight

Electric Wizard chronology
We Live (2004)	Pre-Electric Wizard 1989–1994 (2006)	Witchcult Today (2007)

Professional ratings
Review scores
Source	Rating
AllMusic	3/5 stars

Pre-Electric Wizard 1989–1994 is a compilation album featuring songs by Electric Wizard frontman Jus Oborn's previous band Eternal, formerly known as Lord of Putrefaction and Thy Grief Eternal. The album was released in 2006 and includes material taken from Eternal's demo Lucifer's Children (1993), Thy Grief Eternal's demo On Blackened Wings (1992), and the Lord of Putrefaction / Mortal Remains split LP (1991).

The album's first seven songs, along with two unknown jams, were used in a promotional album by The Music Cartel during the late 1990s to promote Electric Wizard. Both Lucifer's Children and On Blackened Wings were previously released by Rise Above on vinyl in 2005.

== History ==
Electric Wizard was initially formed in Wimborne, Dorset, where the first known incarnation to feature frontman Justin Oborn went under the name Lord of Putrefaction. The band was inspired by different popular bands of the time, including Carcass, Celtic Frost, Slayer, Bolt Thrower and Napalm Death, while the members also had deep-rooted connections in the underground tape trading scene. Following the recording of their 1989 demo, Necromantic, word about the band spread internationally. The demo was followed by the release of a self-produced split vinyl album with Mortal Remains on Nuclear Gore Records.

Following the recording of the split, a notable change began to occur in the band's musical approach, notably a much slower playing style. Band friend Lee Dorrian of Cathedral and Napalm Death took note of the change in musical style after hearing a rehearsal tape and became interested in working with them through his label, Rise Above Records. Following several line-up changes, the band decided to change their name to Thy Grief Eternal in June 1991.

After playing a show with Cathedral at the Marquee Club in London, Dorrian paid for studio sessions for the band to record tracks for inclusion on the second instalment of the doom metal compilation Dark Passages. Due to issues with timing, the tracks did not make the final album and an alternative idea of releasing the recordings as an EP was rejected by the label's distributors in favour of waiting for a full-length album, which also did not materialize. One of the main reasons for this was due to the band continuously developing their sound.

In 1993, the band had changed their name to Eternal and was displaying a much more 1970s-inspired doom sound. Following additional shows in London with Cathedral, Eternal began to headline shows alongside other up and coming new doom bands from the United Kingdom such as Solstice and Mourn. In the summer of 1993, the band recorded the demo Lucifer's Children and initially intended for it to be released on vinyl.

Following the recording sessions, Eternal's line-up went through several changes, mainly due to long-time bassist and associate Dave Gedge relocating to Sherborne. At the same time, Oborn had started working on a new project called Doom Chapter with drummer Mark Greening and bassist Tim Bagshaw. This line up would later become known as Electric Wizard.

== Track listing ==
Lucifer's Children (1993)
No.	Title	Length
1.	"Magickal Childe"	6:02
2.	"Electric Funeral" (Black Sabbath cover)	4:29
3.	"Lucifer's Children"	9:47
4.	"Chrono.Naut (Phase I-IV)"	16:01

On Blackened Wings (1992)
No.	Title	Length
5.	"Swathed in Black"	6:59
6.	"On Blackened Wings"	8:46
7.	"Outro"	1:22

Lord of Putrefaction / Mortal Remains (1991)
No.	Title	Length
8.	"Descent"	3:48
9.	"Wings Over a Black Funeral"	4:47
10.	"At the Cemetery Gates"	6:05
11.	"Dark Prayers"	5:07
Total length:		73:13

== Personnel ==
=== Lord of Putrefaction (1991) ===
- Jus Oborn – electric guitar, vocals
- Adam Richardson – electric guitar, vocals
- Dave Gedge – bass guitar
- James Evans – drums

=== Thy Grief Eternal (1992) ===
- Jus Oborn – electric guitar, vocals
- Gavin Gillingham – electric guitar
- Dave Gedge – bass guitar
- James Evans – drums

=== Eternal (1993) ===
- Jus Oborn – electric guitar, vocals
- Gavin Gillingham – electric guitar
- Dave Gedge – bass guitar
- Gareth Brunsdon – drums
