= We Live =

Studio album by Electric Wizard
- Released: 2004
- Recorded: July 2003
- Genres: Doom metal; stoner metal
- Length: 54:59 (CD); 76:11 (LP reissue)
- Labels: Rise Above; The Music Cartel (US); Candlelight (US reissue); JVC Victor (Japan)
- Producers: Jus Oborn; Mathieus Schneeberger

Electric Wizard chronology
Let Us Prey (2002)	We Live (2004)	Witchcult Today (2007)

We Live is the fifth studio album by English stoner/doom metal band Electric Wizard, released in 2004. It is the first recorded material with the band's second line-up. Due to the addition of second guitarist Liz Buckingham, the songs are more complex than their previous work.

They are named "The Electric Wizard" for the first time on the album cover, and "Electric Wizard II" in the booklet. The booklet also contains the statement: "My enemies, I fear not...but God protect me from my friends".

== History ==
In August 2003, vocalist-guitarist Jus Oborn revealed Electric Wizard's new line-up – drummer Justin Greaves, second-guitarist Liz Buckingham (of 13 and Sourvein), and bassist Rob Al-Issa This new line-up recorded the album in July 2003, just days after Buckingham began rehearsing with the band. As Oborn explained, the addition of Buckingham was crucial given the departure of his previous writing partner, Tim Bagshaw:

"(The addition of) Liz was the most important element...because Tim had left the band and we were writing partners so to speak. So when Liz came aboard we were writing partners again. Our styles were very similar. We have the same sort of down-stroke pattern. And since we were writing together, Electric Wizard was happening again. I have to have a writing partner."

== Album information ==
For this release, Electric Wizard continued to be inspired by horror movies. "Eko Eko Azarak" is the title of the first in a series of Japanese horror movies directed by Shimako Satō, while "Tutti I Colori Del Buio" and "Living Dead at Manchester Morgue" are named after a 1972 Sergio Martino movie and a 1974 Jorge Grau horror movie, respectively. Furthermore, the track "We Live" samples dialog from Don Sharp's 1973 horror film Psychomania.

== Critical reception ==
Professional ratings
Review scores
Source	Rating
Allmusic	3.5/5 stars
MP3.com	(Average)

Upon release, We Live received mostly positive reviews from music critics, with Eduardo Rivadavia of Allmusic writing "2004's We Live witnessed the birth of Electric Wizard Mark II, as lone remaining founding member Jus Oborn – tired of years of internal strife – decided to "upgrade" the doom metal stalwarts from a power trio to a twin-guitar quartet. However, with or without the cosmetic improvement brought on by the addition of second guitarist Liz Buckingham, it's important to point out that this incarnation of Electric Wizard has little in common with the original article of ten years prior."

== Track listing ==
=== CD ===
All tracks are written by Jus Oborn, Rob Al-Issa and Justin Greaves, except where noted.

No.	Title	Writer(s)	Length
1.	"Eko Eko Azarak": I. "Invocation"; II. "Ritual"		10:35
2.	"We Live"		7:46
3.	"Flower of Evil" (a.k.a. "Malfiore")		7:29
4.	"Another Perfect Day?"	Oborn	7:51
5.	"The Sun Has Turned to Black"		6:16
6.	"Saturn's Children"		15:01
Total length:			54:59

=== 2006 reissue bonus track ===
No.	Title	Length
7.	"The Living Dead at Manchester Morgue"	4:58
Total length:		59:57

=== Disc 1 ===
Side one

No.	Title	Length
1.	"Eko Eko Azarak: I. "Invocation"; II. "Ritual"	10:35
2.	"We Live"	7:46

Side two

No.	Title	Length
3.	"Flower of Evil" (a.k.a. "Malfiore")	7:29
4.	"Another Perfect Day?"	7:51

=== Disc 2 ===
Side one

No.	Title	Length
5.	"The Sun Has Turned to Black"	6:16
6.	"Saturn's Children"	15:01

Side two

No.	Title	Length
7.	"Tutti i colori del buio" (not present on the CD version)	16:13

== Personnel ==
- Jus Oborn – guitar, vocals
- Liz Buckingham – guitar
- Rob Al-Issa – bass
- Justin Greaves – drums
- Tony R. - artwork
- All lyrics – Jus Oborn
- All music – Electric Wizard

== Release history ==
Year	Label	Format	Country	Out of print?	Notes
2004	Rise Above	CD	U.K.	Yes	
2004	Rise Above	2LP	U.K.	Yes	Includes bonus track; limited 1000 copies on purple vinyl
2004	The Music Cartel	CD	U.S.	Yes	
2004	JVC Victor	CD	Japan	Yes	
2006	Rise Above	2LP+7"	U.K.	Yes	Includes 2 bonus tracks, 1 on a bonus 7"; limited 1000 copies (500 green, 500 black)
2006	Rise Above	DigiCD	U.K.	No	Remastered version; includes bonus track
2008	Candlelight	DigiCD	U.S.	No	Remastered version; includes bonus track
