= Witchcult Today =

Studio album by Electric Wizard
- Released: 20 November 2007
- Studio: Toe Rag Studios
- Genres: Doom metal; stoner metal
- Length: 58:53
- Labels: Rise Above Records (UK); Candlelight Records (US); Leaf Hound Records (Japan)
- Producer: Liam Watson

Electric Wizard chronology
We Live (2004)	Witchcult Today (2007)	Black Masses (2010)

Witchcult Today is the sixth studio album by English stoner/doom metal band Electric Wizard, released on 20 November 2007.

== Album information ==
The band's fascination with horror movies and writers continues here with "Satanic Rites of Drugula", a reference to the Hammer Studios horror film The Satanic Rites of Dracula, and "Dunwich", a reference to H.P. Lovecraft's short story The Dunwich Horror; also "Black Magic Rituals & Perversions (I. Frisson Des Vampires II. Zora)" makes reference to Jean Rollin film Le Frisson des Vampires (Shiver of the Vampires) and to Italian comic book character Zora the Vampire. Furthermore, the album cover of "Witchcult Today" is edited from the poster for The Devil Rides Out and is reminiscent of a scene from the 1975 occult thriller Race with the Devil.

On 23 May 2012, Metal Blade Records issued a limited edition vinyl which contained Witchcult Today and Black Masses, in order to coincide with the 10th Maryland Deathfest.

== Critical reception ==
Professional ratings
Review scores
Source	Rating
AllMusic	3/5 stars
Blabbermouth.net	8/10
Chronicles of Chaos	9.5/10
Cosmos Gaming	(positive)

Reviews for Witchcult Today were mostly positive, with Thom Jurek of AllMusic writing "Musically, Electric Wizard inhabit the same basic world of stoner/doom/sludge they always have."

== Track listing ==
All tracks are written by Jus Oborn and Elizabeth Buckingham, except where noted.

No.	Title	Writer(s)	Length
1.	"Witchcult Today"		7:54
2.	"Dunwich"		5:34
3.	"Satanic Rites of Drugula"		6:06
4.	"Raptus"		2:13
5.	"The Chosen Few"		8:19
6.	"Torquemada '71"		6:42
7.	"Black Magic Rituals & Perversions": I. "Frisson Des Vampires"; II. "Zora"	Oborn, Buckingham, Gerard Salette, Daniel Roger Pierre Buffet	11:01
8.	"Saturnine"		11:04
Total length:			58:53

== Personnel ==
- Jus Oborn – guitar, vocals, sitar
- Liz Buckingham – guitar, Hammond organ
- Rob Al-Issa – bass
- Shaun Rutter – drums
- All lyrics – Jus Oborn
- All music – Electric Wizard
- Cover artwork – Jus Oborn
- Produced, mixed and engineered by Liam Watson
- Mastered by Noel Summerville

== Release history ==
Year	Label	Format	Country	Out of Print?	Notes
2007	Rise Above	CD	UK	Yes	Limited black disc/foil sleeve version
2007	Rise Above	CD	UK	No	Standard jewel case edition
2007	Leaf Hound	CD	Japan	No	Includes bonus track
2007	Candlelight	CD	US	No	Standard jewel case edition
2007	Rise Above	2LP	UK	Yes	Special "die-hard" edition; includes screened poster and patch; limited 500 copies (100 purple, 200 black/silver sparkle, 200 green)
2007	Rise Above	2LP	UK	Yes	Limited 1500 copies (500 black, 500 clear, 500 silver/grey)
2010	Rise Above	2LP	UK	No	"Black Edition", features slightly altered cover art. Non-Gatefold.
