= Electric Wizard (album) =

Studio album by Electric Wizard
- Released: 1994
- Recorded: Rhythm Studios
- Genres: Doom metal; stoner metal
- Length: 47:24
- Label: Rise Above
- Producers: Jus Oborn, Paul Johnson

Electric Wizard chronology
Electric Wizard (1994)	Demon Lung (1996)

Electric Wizard studio album chronology
Electric Wizard (1994)	Come My Fanatics... (1997)

Electric Wizard is the debut studio album by English stoner/doom metal band Electric Wizard released in 1994 through Rise Above Records and re-released bundled with their second album, Come My Fanatics... in 1999. A remastered version was then released on CD and LP in 2006, with two bonus tracks, taken from a demo entitled Doom Chapter.

== History ==
The origins of Electric Wizard go back to 1988 when Jus Oborn formed the band Lord of Putrefaction. They put out three demo tapes from 1989 to 1991 and also did one split with Mortal Remains. In 1992, the name was changed to Thy Grief Eternal after Adam Richardson left the band. They put out one demo under this name titled On Blackened Wings. In 1993, James Evans left the band and they once again changed their name, shortening it to Eternal. The band released two demos under this name. After Gavin Gillingham left the band, Oborn started Electric Wizard. The recordings from this era were issued on the Pre-Electric Wizard 1989–1994 compilation in 2006.

Electric Wizard began in Wimborne in Dorset, England during 1993, and was composed of guitarist-vocalist Jus Oborn, bassist Tim Bagshaw, and drummer Mark Greening. The band's name was taken from two Black Sabbath songs: "Electric Funeral" and "The Wizard". Oborn remarked, "Is the name Electric Wizard made out of two Black Sabbath song titles? (smokes a big bud of weed through a can) Hahahaha, yeah it is!"

In 1994 the band released the album through Rise Above Records.

== Critical reception ==
Professional ratings
Review scores
Source	Rating
Allmusic	4/5 stars
Collector's Guide to Heavy Metal	6/10

Electric Wizard received mostly positive reviews from music critics, with Eduardo Rivadavia of Allmusic writing "When Electric Wizard first emerged, seemingly fully formed from the hallowed wombs of the doom metal gods (well, Dorset, England, anyway), all most listeners could do was stand in dumbfounded awe -- such was the power and magnitude with which the trio delivered its monolithic epics. Taking up the torch from doom pioneers like Saint Vitus, Sleep, and more recently Britain's own Cathedral, the eternally stoned-out trio went about setting a new standard for slothful, detuned heavy metal noisemaking; yet -- amazingly, compared to subsequent efforts -- their eponymous debut's crushing wall of sludge would soon seem almost lightweight. Most of the songs on Electric Wizard crawl along at a snail's pace, their mind-numbing riffs exploring the lowest imaginable sonic frequencies still within human range. Except for the trippy space rock guitar of "Mountains of Mars," the entire record revels in the purest, uncompromising post-Sabbath doom metal dirge, a great part of which may prove too sluggish and impenetrable for inexperienced listeners. But for knowledgeable consumers of the genre, weed-worshipping anthems like "Stone Magnet," "Devil's Bride," and the group's awesome namesake, "Electric Wizard" (which is introduced by a long, highly suspicious exhaled breath), amount to a mind-shattering experience...prepare to be enlightened."

== Track listing ==
=== Original ===
All lyrics are written by Jus Oborn; all music is composed by Electric Wizard (Oborn, Tim Bagshaw, Mark Greening).

No.	Title	Length
1.	"Stone Magnet"	4:52
2.	"Mourning Prayer"	5:06
3.	"Mountains of Mars" (instrumental)	3:47
4.	"Behemoth"	8:54
5.	"Devil's Bride"	6:34
6.	"Black Butterfly"	8:20
7.	"Electric Wizard"	9:40
8.	"Wooden Pipe"	0:08
Total length:		47:24

=== Japanese edition bonus track ===
No.	Title	Length
9.	"Demon Lung"	5:56
Total length:		53:20

=== Bonus songs on 2006 reissue ===
No.	Title	Length
9.	"Illimitable Nebulie" (Demo)	4:51
10.	"Mourning Prayer, Part 1" (Demo)	5:19
Total length:		57:36

== Personnel ==
- Jus Oborn – guitar, vocals
- Tim Bagshaw – bass
- Mark Greening – drums

== Release history ==
Year	Label	Format	Country	Out of Print?	Notes
1995	Rise Above	CD	UK	Yes	original CD release
1995	Rise Above	LP	UK	Yes	original LP release; limited 1000 copies on green vinyl
1999	Rise Above	2CD	UK	Yes	coupled with Come My Fanatics...
2002	Rise Above	CD	UK	Yes	
2006	Rise Above	DigiCD	UK	No	remastered version; includes 2 bonus tracks
2006	Candlelight	DigiCD	U.S.	No	remastered version; includes 2 bonus tracks
2006	Rise Above	2LP+7"	UK	Yes	remastered version; includes 2 bonus tracks on a 7" limited 1500 copies (500 black, 500 ice blue, 500 luminous green)
