= Jus Oborn =

British heavy metal musician

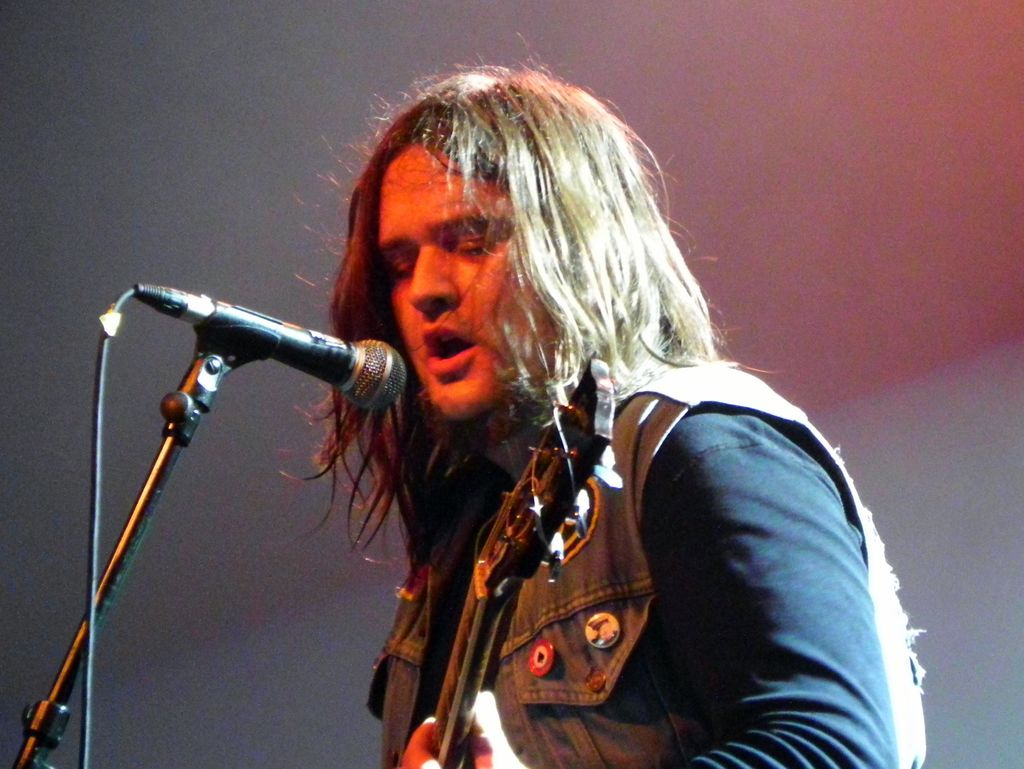
- Oborn performing with Electric Wizard in 2011

Background information
- Birth name: Justin Oborn
- Born: 30 October 1971 (age 53)
- Origin: Dorset, England
- Genres: Doom metal, stoner metal
- Occupation: Musician
- Instrument(s): Vocals, guitar
- Years active: 1988–present
- Member of: Electric Wizard

Justin Oborn (born 30 October 1971) is a British musician. He is the lead vocalist, guitarist and lyricist of Electric Wizard, a stoner/doom band from Dorset, which he co-founded in 1993. Prior to forming Electric Wizard, he was a member of doom metal band Lord of Putrefaction, which changed its name to Thy Grief Eternal and then to Eternal.

== Career ==
In 1988, Oborn formed Lord of Putrefaction. They recorded two demos, before changing their name to Thy Grief Eternal and recording the On Blackened Wings demo. The band then became known simply as Eternal and recorded the Lucifer's Children demo, before disbanding. In 1993, Oborn formed Electric Wizard. He has been the band's frontman since that time. They have released nine albums since 1995.

In early 2003, Tim Bagshaw and Mark Greening left the band, making Oborn the only founding member remaining. Later in that year, Oborn gathered a new line-up for the band, which included his wife, Liz Buckingham, as second guitarist. She has remained part of the band ever since, with her and Oborn both handling guitar duties on Electric Wizard's more recent releases.

== Personal life ==
Oborn is married to Liz Buckingham, his bandmate of Electric Wizard who joined the group in 2003.

== Discography ==
- 1989 – Necromantic demo
- 1991 – Wings Over a Black Funeral demo
- 1992 – On Blackened Wings demo
- 1993 – Lucifer's Children demo
  The above were later included on the compilation Pre-Electric Wizard 1989–1994
- 1995 – Electric Wizard
- 1996 – Demon Lung
- 1997 – Come My Fanatics...
- 1997 – Chrono.Naut
- 1998 – Supercoven
- 2000 – Dopethrone
- 2002 – Let Us Prey
- 2004 – We Live
- 2007 – Witchcult Today
- 2008 – The House on the Borderland
- 2008 – The Processean
- 2010 – Black Masses
- 2014 – Time to Die
- 2017 – Wizard Bloody Wizard
