= Come My Fanatics... =

Come My Fanatics…

Studio album by Electric Wizard
- Released: January 1997
- Recorded: July 1996
- Studios: Red Dog Studios, Bournemouth
- Genres: Doom metal; stoner metal
- Length: 49:43
- Label: Rise Above
- Producers: Jus Oborn; Rolf Startin; Mike Hurst

Electric Wizard chronology
Electric Wizard/Our Haunted Kingdom (1996)	Come My Fanatics… (1997)	Chrono.Naut (1997)

Electric Wizard studio album chronology
Electric Wizard (1994)	Come My Fanatics... (1997)	Dopethrone (2000)

Original cover

Come My Fanatics... is the second studio album by English doom metal band Electric Wizard. The album was released in January 1997 on Rise Above Records and was produced by Rolf Startin, Mike Hurst and band member Jus Oborn. It was the group's follow-up to their eponymous album Electric Wizard. Oborn described the release as a reaction to the music on the earlier album, which he had felt was not as heavy as he wanted the group to sound. The songs on Come My Fanatics… were described by Lee Dorrian, Rise Above Records owner, as breaking from the traditional doom metal style, with an unpolished and chaotic approach.

The thematic elements of the album draw from 1970s horror films, biker movies and the writings of H. P. Lovecraft; there are three songs about leaving Earth to avoid an impending environmental disaster. The album release was followed by a tour with the band Cathedral and positive reviews from heavy metal magazines Metal Hammer, Terrorizer and Kerrang!. Come My Fanatics… continued to receive praise in retrospective reviews, with Terrorizer declaring it "the wake-up that the UK doom scene needed" and Dorrian describing it as "the turning point of everything".

== Production ==
=== Background ===
Prior to recording with Electric Wizard, lead singer Jus Oborn was mostly interested in the death metal genre. After listening to Black Sabbath under the influence of mushrooms, he was inspired to take his music in a different direction. At the time, Oborn was a member of a group called Eternal, who were drifting apart; Oborn said, "I had a vision of doing the doom stuff. The rest of the guys were just into Alice in Chains."

After forming in 1993, Electric Wizard recorded their self-titled debut album, which was released in 1994. AllMusic editor Eduardo Rivadavia described the album as "impressive" but considered Electric Wizards music to be "pretty standard doom fare for the time." Oborn was not happy with the recording of Electric Wizard, finding it lighter-sounding than they had wanted. He said, "We went to a big fancy studio and we were like, 'Oh no, we've gotta do as we're told". This led to the sound of their follow-up album, Come My Fanatics...; Oborn said, "it had to sound right this time". About the recording period, Oborn said, "Our country wasn't in a great state. And metal was totally fucked at that point. We were really making a musical statement. When you're younger everything is a reaction against the world."

=== Recording ===
Oborn found producer Rolf Startin, who shared the band's desire for rawness and feeling, listed in the Yellow Pages. Startin was prepared to build the studio around the band, supplying the band with vintage amplifiers. Come My Fanatics... was recorded at Red Dog Studios in July 1996. Oborn later described the album's production as "very technically inept", and said it was "very difficult to deliberately do things badly. It just happened. It was exactly the sound we were trying to create."

Some songs on the album contain samples from films such as "Return Trip", which contains a sample of the film Cannibal Ferox. The horror film samples came from video nasties passed under the table at the market stall in Wimborne in Dorset, where the members of the group lived. The song "Invixor B/Phase Inducer" is an instrumental track, with an introduction that came about by accident when the band experimented with a drum & bass sampler in the studio. Oborn said the group were "quite impressed, even though we didn’t like the music". He mentioned specific albums, such as Six Million Ways to Die "seemed quite brutal in the use of samples and that was something we thought we could bring to our music". The album's closing track, "Solarian 13" is also an instrumental track.

== Music and themes ==
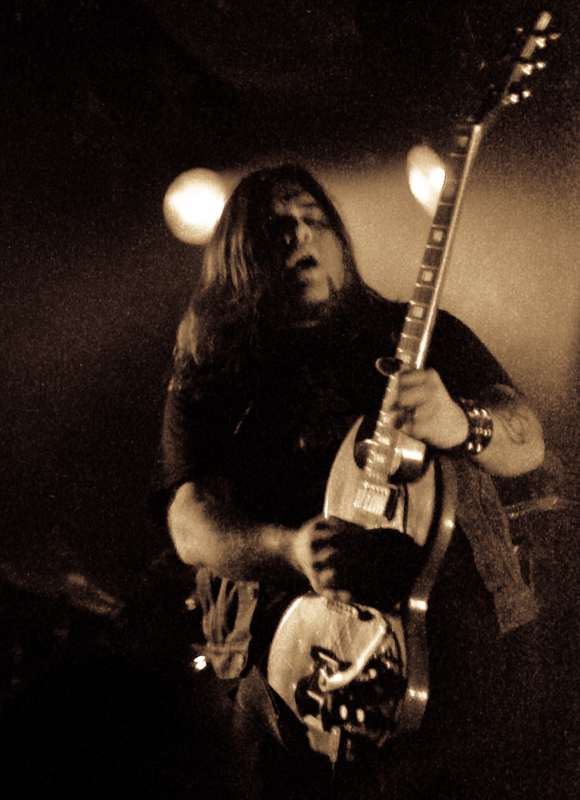
Jus Oborn stated the sound of Come My Fanatics... was in response to the first album not being as heavy sounding as expected

Rise Above Records owner Lee Dorrian stated that the group's sound on the record "somehow managed to break the mould of traditional doom metal", noting that previous doom metal groups are "very morose and slow and heavy which can be very off-putting" while Electric Wizard had a guitar sound that had a "completely unpolished approach to the way they present themselves". Dan Franklin, writing for The Quietus, stated the group's style of music was "completely contrary to the surprisingly spiritual tendencies of Trouble and others", noting its "thick, chaotic and crushing sound". A 29-second sample of Electric Wizards's "Wizard in Black" featuring the groups use of sampling echoed these statements, noting that the album "somehow upped the sonic ante through a wall of sludge so thick that even the most experienced of metal heads couldn't help but be overwhelmed by its power". Dorrian also found the album difficult on a first listen, stating:

When I first listened to it I was like 'Fucking hell I can't hear the drums' but realized that it was a good thing that they were completely buried. I just got completely stoned and listened to it on my bed and thought it was the most amazing thing I'd ever heard.

The music on the album draws influences from 1970s horror films, biker movies and the works of H. P. Lovecraft. Oborn had read Lovecraft since his early teenage years and admired his work, particularly the idea "that art should be otherworldly and have this sense of fear and something beyond our understanding. I took that as more of an influence than literally talking about tentacle-headed monsters, which only crosses the surface level." Oborn also said Come My Fanatics... was conceived as a "piece of escapism", developed from an "insular, underground feeling that we were heading to our doom as a planet and no-one overground had a fucking clue about it". He stated that final three songs on the album, "Ivixor B / Phase Inducer", "Son of Nothing" and "Solarian 13", were a concept about leaving Earth because it was "so fucked up". He said the ethic was that the planet was heading towards an environmental disaster and:

"Wizard in Black"
A 29-second sample of Electric Wizards's "Wizard in Black" featuring the groups use of sampling and "wall of sludge" sound described by Eduardo Rivadivia of AllMusic

(...) the powers that be aren't doing anything about it and don't care about the poorer people. So that was behind it all. It might seem more widely recognised now, but that's more to do with the internet and people's education about the way the world is. Back then you were considered quite a paranoid, underground freak if you thought the world was controlled by the powers that be and no-one really cared about us.

== Release ==
Come My Fanatics... was released in January 1997 by Rise Above Records. The album did not reach chart in the United Kingdom. The label's founder Lee Dorrian had previously tried to promote doom metal music in the United Kingdom through compilation albums such as Dark Passages, featuring bands including Penance, Revelation and Mourn, to define a British scene. Dorrian later said the release of Come My Fanatics... was "the turning point of everything". Terrorizer echoed these statements in 2012, calling the album "the wake-up that the UK doom scene needed and proved it wasn't just about frilly shirts and gothic morbidity".

Come My Fanatics... received several re-releases in 1999; Rise Above re-released it on 19 April 1999 with new artwork. The new cover depicts Anton LaVey and his disciples and is based on still from a 1971 television documentary called The Power of the Witch. To create the cover, Oborn paused his videotaped copy of the documentary and traced the image from his television screen; he added the space background later. The Music Cartel distributed the album in the United States in 1999. Come My Fanatics... was released in Japan with the bonus track "Return to the Sun of Nothingness". Both Electric Wizard and Come My Fanatics... were re-packaged as a single release in 1999. In Finland, the album charted in 2011, charting at number 28 on the chart.

=== Touring and follow-up ===
After the initial 1997 release of the album, Electric Wizard toured the United Kingdom with Cathedral in February 1997, and in Europe with labelmates Mourn. This was planned to be followed with a tour supporting The Blood Divine in early April with Orange Goblin, which Electric Wizard later dropped out of.

Following the release of Come My Fanatics... the group released the EP Supercoven (1998). Their next studio album, Dopethrone, was not released until four years later. Oborn said of the hiatus, "I would safely say there was a period where we split up. We just didn't tell anybody."

== Reception ==
Professional ratings
Review scores
Source	Rating
AllMusic	4.5/5 stars
Collector's Guide to Heavy Metal	3/10
Hit Parader	3/5 stars
Kerrang!	5/5 stars
Metal Hammer	4/5 stars
Terrorizer	4/5 stars

On its release, Come My Fanatics... received positive reviews from heavy rock magazines Terrorizer, Kerrang! and Metal Hammer. Metal Hammer called the album "a right corker" while Terrorizer said, "this is out there in orbit with Hawkwind's 'Space Ritual', and that's a compliment in its own way. Wastoids they are, but the 'Wiz have made a great Stoner Doom record." Kerrang! stated Electric Wizard "have delivered one of the most punishingly heavy albums in recent memory", concluding that "Classic is the only word for it". The album received a brief review in Hit Parader in 1999 stating the group had become a favourite among European rock magazine press, with a review saying it had "enough "expand your mind" euphemisms to keep any latter-day hippies happily bemused."

From retrospective articles and reviews, The Guardian said, "Oborn’s vision of creating the heaviest music imaginable was put firmly into practice for 1997’s still astonishing Come My Fanatics … , a record that was so devastatingly slow, heavy and obnoxious that it made everything else around it sound anaemic and pedestrian". AllMusic called it "absolutely colossal" and "essential doom", noting it was "somewhat less immediate than its predecessor ... even the most experienced of metal heads couldn't help but be overwhelmed by its power", and that tracks such as "Doom-Mantia" and "Son of Nothing" would "test the patience of uninitiated listeners before drifting into focus through billowing clouds of smoke, but the ultimate religious experience is well worth the lengthy conversion process". In an overview of the bands discography, Harry Sword of Noisey declared that Come My Fanatics... was when Electric Wizard "really hit home, its turgid doom imbued with sleazy cosmic reach and a blackened punkish energy." and that it "ushered in a new era for doom, engineering a full-on scuzz attack that felt cosmic in reach and was anchored by a very human rage." Metal Hammer included the album in their 2020 list of the top 10 1997 albums.

Oborn later stated that Come My Fanatics... is his favourite of the group's earlier material. He said, "I can’t honestly remember doing it, so it is like listening to another band and I do like that album a lot. I remember doing Dopethrone and it was particularly hard work and a miserable experience so I don't look at it fondly."

== Track listing ==
All lyrics are written by Jus Oborn; all music is composed by Electric Wizard (Oborn, Tim Bagshaw, Mark Greening).

No.	Title	Length
1.	"Return Trip"	10:15
2.	"Wizard in Black"	8:15
3.	"Doom-Mantia"	8:35
4.	"Ivixor B / Phase Inducer"	8:40
5.	"Son of Nothing"	6:50
6.	"Solarian 13"	8:08
Total length:		49:43

== Personnel ==
Credits adapted from the liner notes

- Jus Oborn – lead guitar, vocals, effects, producer, mixing
- Tim Bagshaw – lead bass, effects
- Mark Greening – drums, concussion
- Rolf Startin – producer, mixing
- Mike Hurst – producer, mixing

== See also ==
- 1997 in music
- 1997 in British music
- 1997 in heavy metal music
