= Supercoven =

EP by Electric Wizard
- Released: 1998
- Genre: Doom metal; stoner metal
- Length: 31:52
- Label: Bad Acid; Southern Lord (SUNN02)
- Producer: Jus Oborn, Jamie King and Rolf Startin

Electric Wizard chronology
Chrono.Naut/Nuclear Guru (1997)	Supercoven (1998)	Dopethrone (2000)

Professional ratings
Review scores
Source	Rating
AllMusic	3/5 stars
Kerrang!	3/5 stars

Supercoven is a two song EP by the stoner/doom metal band Electric Wizard. It was originally released on CD and 12" vinyl in 1998 through Bad Acid Records. In 2000, it was re-released on CD through Southern Lord Records with two extra songs.

== Track listing ==
Original track listing:

1. "Supercoven" – 13:13
2. "Burnout" – 18:37

Extra songs included on the 2000 reissue:

3. "Wizards of Gore" – 9:02
4. "Electric Wizard (live)" – 9:53

== Personnel ==
- Jus Oborn – guitar, vocals
- Tim Bagshaw – bass
- Mark Greening – drums
- All lyrics – Jus Oborn
- All music – Electric Wizard
- Artwork – Tim Bagshaw

== Release history ==
Year	Label	Format	Country	Notes
1998	Bad Acid	CD	United Kingdom	
1998	Bad Acid	LP	United Kingdom	
2000	Southern Lord	CD	United States	Contains two bonus tracks
