= Dopethrone =

2000 studio album by Electric Wizard

Studio album by Electric Wizard
- Released: 25 September 2000
- Recorded: May–June 2000
- Studio: Chuckalumba Studios
- Genres: Doom metal; stoner rock
- Length: 71:08
- Label: Rise Above
- Producer: Rolf Startin

Electric Wizard chronology
Supercoven (1998)	Dopethrone (2000)	Let Us Prey (2002)

Electric Wizard studio album chronology
Come My Fanatics... (1997)	Dopethrone (2000)	Let Us Prey (2002)

Dopethrone is the third studio album by English band Electric Wizard, released on 25 September 2000 by Rise Above Records. Following the release and tour of their previous studio album Come My Fanatics... (1997), the group was asked by Rise Above owner Lee Dorrian to create a follow-up. Vocalist and guitarist Jus Oborn has stated that drug issues and other personal problems led to the production of Dopethrone being a "difficult process". The group entered Chuckalumba Studios in May 2000 with only three tracks written: "Dopethrone", "Funeralopolis", and "We Hate You". The album was recorded in three days. Oborn, who wrote all of the album's lyrics, spoke of H. P. Lovecraft and Robert E. Howard as influences in his own writing while the group disagreed during the mixing sessions about how the overall record should sound. The music on the album has been described as both doom metal and stoner rock, with influences of British groups like Black Sabbath and Motörhead.

After Dopethrone's release, Electric Wizard went on tour with Sons of Otis in England, followed by a tour in Europe and the group's first performances in the United States. The album was released to positive reviews from Exclaim!, CMJ New Music Monthly, and The Village Voice. Retrospective reviews continued to be positive, with Decibel placing the album on their list of the "Top 20 Stoner Rock Albums of All Time" in September 2007, and Terrorizer declaring Dopethrone the album of the decade in December 2009.

== Background and production ==
Following the release of their 1997 album Come My Fanatics..., Sean Palmerston of Exclaim! stated that Electric Wizard became "pretty much invisible". Vocalist and guitarist Jus Oborn claimed that the music "isn't pop music, where there's commercial pressure to deliver all the time. This is underground metal where, if you're lucky, you might sell one or two copies". Oborn felt that he was pressured by Lee Dorrian, the owner of Rise Above Records, to create a new album. Oborn stated the group all had "drug issues" between the releases of the two albums. Tim Bagshaw, the group's bassist, has said that he was arrested for breaking into a liquor store, and drummer Mark Greening fell off his motorcycle and broke his collarbone. Meanwhile, Oborn was arrested for setting fire to a Reliant Robin. Oborn felt that the difficulties that the band's members experienced in the three years between studio albums were channeled into Dopethrone, and that creating the album was "such a difficult process that it kind of made [life] worse."

Oborn said that the group developed songs via jam sessions, which would occasionally lead to the creation of a song. Prior to entering the studio, only three tracks were written: "Dopethrone", "Funeralopolis", and "We Hate You". Bagshaw said that he wrote "quite a lot of the album", including writing "Vinum Sabbathi" in "about two minutes", along with "I, The Witchfinder", "Golgotha", and "We Hate You". The album's centrepiece, titled "Weird Tales", was created entirely within the studio. On discussing the track's multiple parts, Oborn later declared it "kind of stupid, like prog-rock or some shit." Greening's contribution was hearing what Bagshaw and Oborn had come up with and drumming to it. The album was recorded at Chuckalumba Studios between May and June 2000. Prior to recording each song, Oborn indulged in both cannabis and cocaine; Bagshaw said that the group consumed "copious amounts of weed and booze".

Bagshaw and Greening described the recording sessions as mostly about "getting really stoned" and "quite good fun", respectively. Oborn recalled that the initial recording sessions were about three or four days, with the mixing taking much longer as there were arguments among the group members. Oborn argued with producer Rolf Startin about how the album should sound. Two longer tracks, "Weird Tales" and "Dopethrone", were completed in their first and second takes, respectively. Oborn said that "back then we didn't have a way to cut it up and just redo one part." The track "Mind Transferal" was recorded during this session but only released later as a bonus track for Japanese releases of the album.

== Music ==
Greg Kot of the Chicago Tribune said that unlike American stoner rock that drew from punk music, grunge, and heavy metal, the music on Dopethrone was more akin to early 1970s Black Sabbath and the music of Motörhead. Jim DeRogatis of The Chicago Sun-Times noted that the style was primarily known as stoner rock in the United States and "Doom" in the United Kingdom. Greening spoke in 2007 about the Electric Wizard albums he had worked on, saying that "I wanted something with louder drums. I always regret all the Electric Wizard releases, because the drums don't sound loud enough", and that Dopethrone did "not represent the sound I was trying to give off, as with all Electric Wizard releases." Oborn said that the other members of the group wanted to introduce elements of hip hop music and the sound of Nirvana. Oborn later recalled that Bagshaw had been "into some weird shit; he'd listen to Linkin Park and shit like that. Fucking shite. [...] They wanted to put scratching or some shit on one song, and I could've killed them."

Anthony Bartkewicz of Decibel commented that the Oborn's lyrics put Dopethrone more in line with death or black metal than Black Sabbath's "hippie-love brother sentiment". Oborn, who wrote all of the album's lyrics, spoke of H. P. Lovecraft and Robert E. Howard as an influence on his own writing, specifically the atmosphere of Lovecraft's work and Howard's "attitude towards society, these anti-civilization rants. That was a big inspiration for me." On specific Lovecraft stories that inspired him, Oborn cited "The Music of Erich Zann" and "The Dreams in the Witch House", with their themes of the occult being carried into music through time signatures. Oborn described the inspiration of the song "Dopethrone" as a story he had heard about someone who owned a couch made entirely of dope. "We Hate You" was inspired by Ozzy Osbourne, whom Oborn described as "always going about how much he fucking loved everyone, so we thought it would be great to go and do the opposite."

== Release ==
Dopethrone was released on 25 September 2000 by Rise Above Records. The Music Cartel released the album in the United States via mail order on 20 November 2000. It became available in retail shops in January 2001. The album was reissued in 2004; this version included the bonus track "Mind Transferal". The 2004 reissue of the album also had the track "Dopethrone" edited down from 20 minutes to 10 minutes. When asked about this edit in 2007, Oborn responded that he was unaware that the change had been made.

Following the release of the album, Electric Wizard toured with the group Sons of Otis, initially in England starting on 27 September 2000, followed by shows across Europe, including Switzerland, Germany, Denmark, Sweden, and the Netherlands. The tour concluded with a final show in England on 22 October in Bradford. Following the tour, Electric Wizard did their first tour of the United States, becoming the first band on the Rise Above Records label to tour the country. The tour began on 4 March 2001, and it concluded on 8 April with a show at South by Southwest. On the tour, the band predominantly toured with Warhorse, while also performing shows with Bongzilla, Cathedral, and Converge. On 7 March, the three members of Electric Wizard were searched and interrogated for possession of illegal substances in Richmond, Virginia. Erik Larson of Alabama Thunderpussy, who were also performing that day, was able to assist the group in getting the police to drop the charges. The band's American label, The Music Cartel, responded to the event, stating that "with a band like Electric Wizard something like this happening wasn't very far off the mark. I just hope nothing worse happens before the tour is completed." Bagshaw reflected on their American tour as like serving in the Vietnam War, saying that it "strengthened their armor". Greening said that the tour "seemed like a good laugh" but that the group was "young at the time [...] at times it was soul destroying." Oborn commented more positively on it, expressing his excitement about touring the United States and "staying at great hotels, being treated like kings", while noting that the group had still argued a lot while on tour.

== Reception ==
Professional ratings
Review scores
Source	Rating
AllMusic	5/5 stars
Chicago Sun-Times	3.5/4 stars
Collector's Guide to Heavy Metal	4/10
The Encyclopedia of Popular Music	4/5 stars
Kerrang!	3/5 stars
Metal Hammer	8/10
Rock Hard	8/10
Rock Sound	4.5/5 stars
Terrorizer	9/10

Dopethrone received positive reviews from CMJ New Music Monthly, Exclaim!, AllMusic, and The Chicago Sun-Times. Palmerston of Exclaim! and Eduardo Rivadavia of AllMusic found the album was so strong and high-quality that it had set a standard of the genre. Other reviewers felt the album had an over-the-top nature in terms of vocals and music. DeRogatis said audiences might approach the album as being close to a Spinal Tap-like parody but felt that it did not negate the group from being "one of the most intense rock bands pounding the boards anywhere in this new millennium." George Smith of the Village Voice also commented on the music, referring to it as a doom metal equivalent of the German beer brewing process Reinheitsgebot, declaring it "bitter and sulfuric to the point of unpalatability, but against which everything else seems watery." In a more mixed review from Kerrang!, Mörat stated that although Dopethrone was "an aural landslide", there were "times when all [its] psychedelic sludgery drags on like a new ice age."

Oborn initially said that he had not wanted to listen to the album for a long time and that he was unaware of how the album was received by critics or fans until he began touring to promote it. Bagshaw commented on the album in 2007, saying that he did not care what others felt about the album. Oborn commented in 2011 that he looked fondly on the album, calling Come My Fanatics… (1997), Supercoven (1998), and Dopethrone "the trilogy of terror", and saying that by the time they got to Dopethrone, that he knew what the group needed. Anthony Bartkewicz of Decibel, in commenting on the album's legacy, said that it established doom metal formally as a lifestyle.

Accolades for Dopethrone
Publication	Country	Accolade	Year	Rank	Ref.
Decibel	United States	Top 20 Stoner Rock Albums of All Time	2007	2	
Decibel	United States	Top 100 Greatest Metal Albums of the Decade	2009	10	
Decibel	United States	Top 100 Doom Metal Albums of All Time	2014	8	
Loudwire	United States	Top 25 Doom Metal Albums of All Time	2017	3	
Metal Hammer	United Kingdom	The 100 greatest metal albums of the 21st century	2018	31	
Terrorizer	United Kingdom	Writers Poll 2000	2000	3	
Terrorizer	United Kingdom	Top 100 Albums of the Decade	2009	1	
Terrorizer	United Kingdom	The 40 Most Important Extreme Albums of the Century	2014	4	

== Track listing ==
All lyrics are written by Jus Oborn; all music is composed by Electric Wizard (Oborn, Tim Bagshaw, Mark Greening).

Original Issue
No.	Title	Length
1.	"Vinum Sabbathi"	3:06
2.	"Funeralopolis"	8:43
3.	"Weird Tales": I. "Electric Frost"; II. "Golgatha"; III. "Altar of Melektaus"	15:04
4.	"Barbarian"	6:29
5.	"I, The Witchfinder"	11:03
6.	"The Hills Have Eyes"	0:47
7.	"We Hate You"	5:08
8.	"Dopethrone"	20:48
Total length:		71:08

Remastered
No.	Title	Length
1.	"Vinum Sabbathi"	3:05
2.	"Funeralopolis"	8:43
3.	"Weird Tales": I. "Electric Frost"; II. "Golgatha"; III. "Altar of Melektaus"	15:04
4.	"Barbarian"	6:29
5.	"I, The Witchfinder"	11:04
6.	"The Hills Have Eyes"	0:46
7.	"We Hate You"	5:08
8.	"Dopethrone"	10:36
9.	"Mind Transferal"	14:56
Total length:		75:51

== Personnel ==
Credits adapted from the liner notes of the album. Extra details are from Decibel.

Electric Wizard

- Jus Oborn – vocals, guitar, effects, lyrics, artwork, design
- Tim Bagshaw – bass, effects
- Mark Greening – drums

Other credits

- Electric Wizard – performer and "deranger"
- Rolf Startin – mixing, producer
- Josh Stephen – assistant
- Hugh Gilmour – artwork, design, photography
- Tom Bagshaw – cover art

== See also ==
- 2000 in British music
- 2000 in heavy metal music
