= Electric Wizard =

British metal band

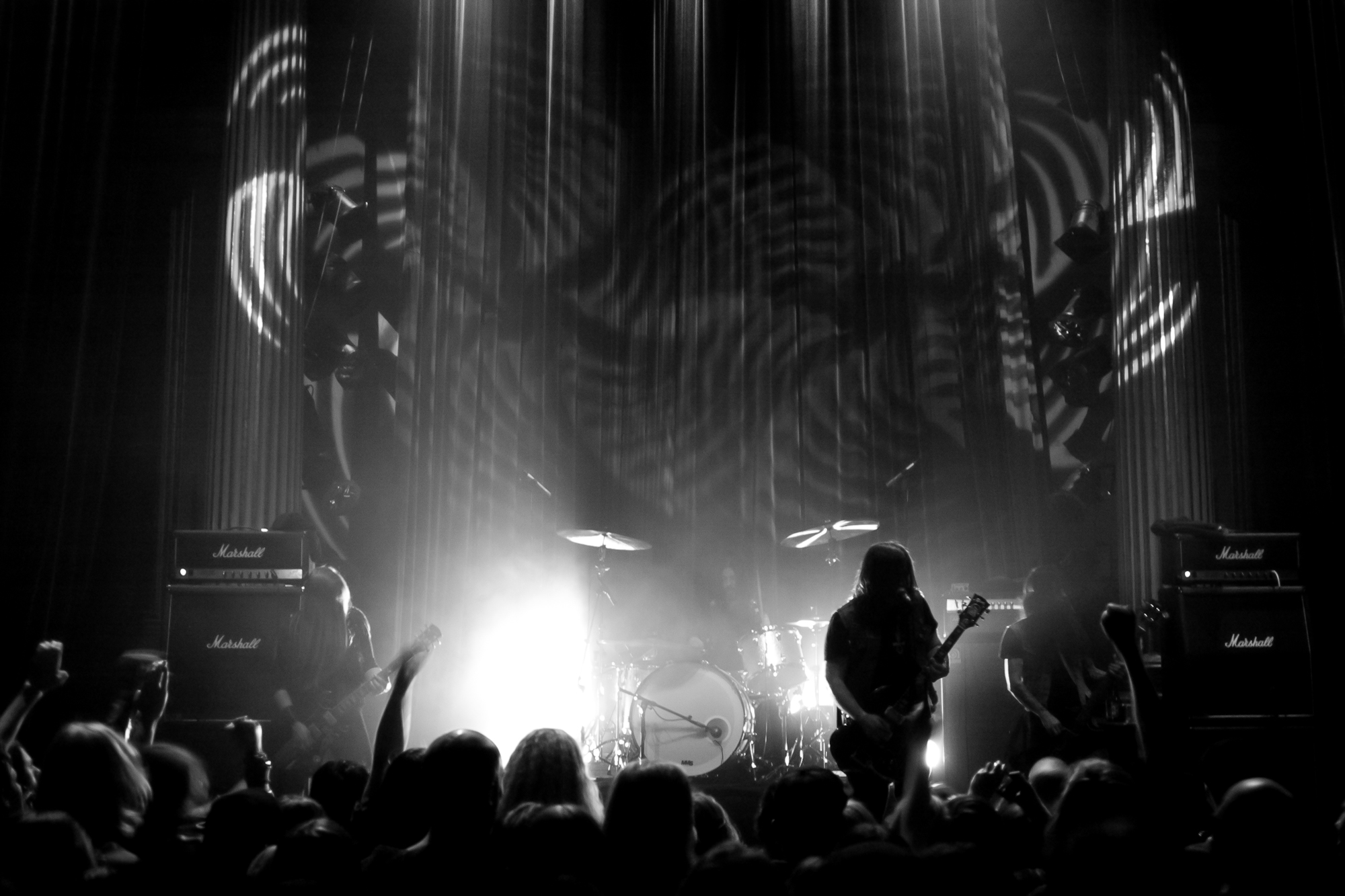
- Electric Wizard live in 2012

Background information
- Also known as: Lord of Putrefaction (1988–1991); Thy Grief Eternal (1991–1992); Eternal (1992–1993); The Electric Wizard
- Origin: Dorset, England
- Genres: Doom metal; stoner metal
- Years active: 1988–present
- Labels: Rise Above; Witchfinder
- Members: Jus Oborn; Liz Buckingham; Simon Poole; Haz Wheaton
- Past members: Mark Greening; Tim Bagshaw; Rob Al-Issa; Justin Greaves; Shaun Rutter; Tas Danazoglou; Glenn Charman; Clayton Burgess

Electric Wizard are an English doom/stoner metal band from Dorset. Formed in 1988 under the name Lord of Putrefaction, the band have recorded nine studio albums, two of which have been considered genre landmarks: Come My Fanatics… (1997) and Dopethrone (2000). Electric Wizard's brand of doom metal incorporates stoner and sludge traits, with lyrics focusing on the occult, witchcraft, H. P. Lovecraft, horror films and cannabis.

== History ==
=== Pre-Electric Wizard (1988–1993) ===
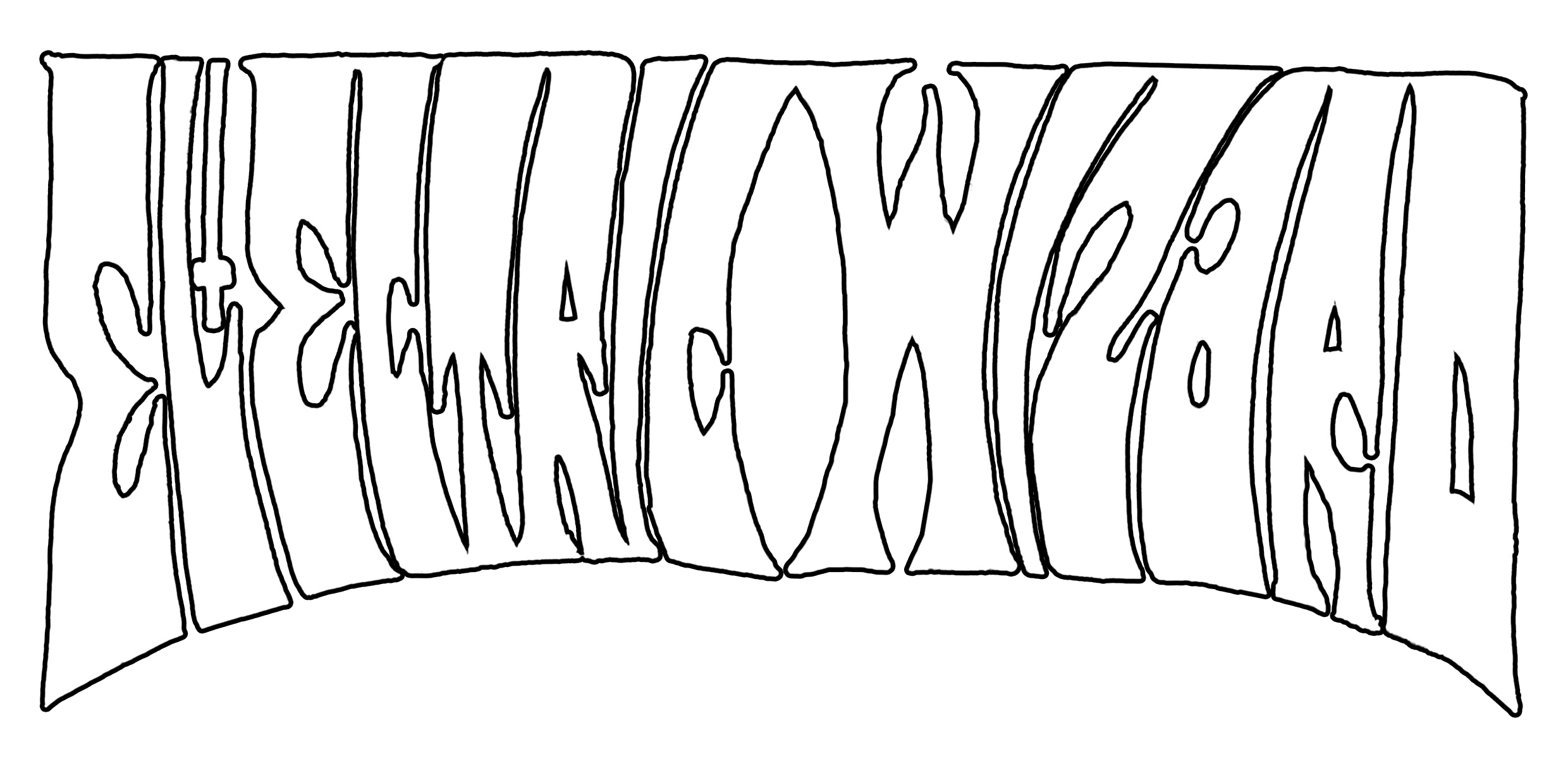
The Electric Wizard logo

The origins of Electric Wizard go back to 1988 when Jus Oborn formed the band Lord of Putrefaction. They put out three demo tapes from 1989 to 1991 and also recorded a split album with Mortal Remains. In 1992, the name was changed to Thy Grief Eternal after Adam Richardson left the band. They put out one demo under this name titled On Blackened Wings. In 1993, James Evans left the band and they once again changed their name, shortening it to Eternal. The band released two demos under this name. After Gavin Gillingham left the band, Oborn started Electric Wizard. The recordings from this era were issued on the Pre-Electric Wizard 1989–1994 compilation in 2006.

=== Formation, debut album, Come My Fanatics, Dopethrone and Let Us Prey (1993–2003) ===
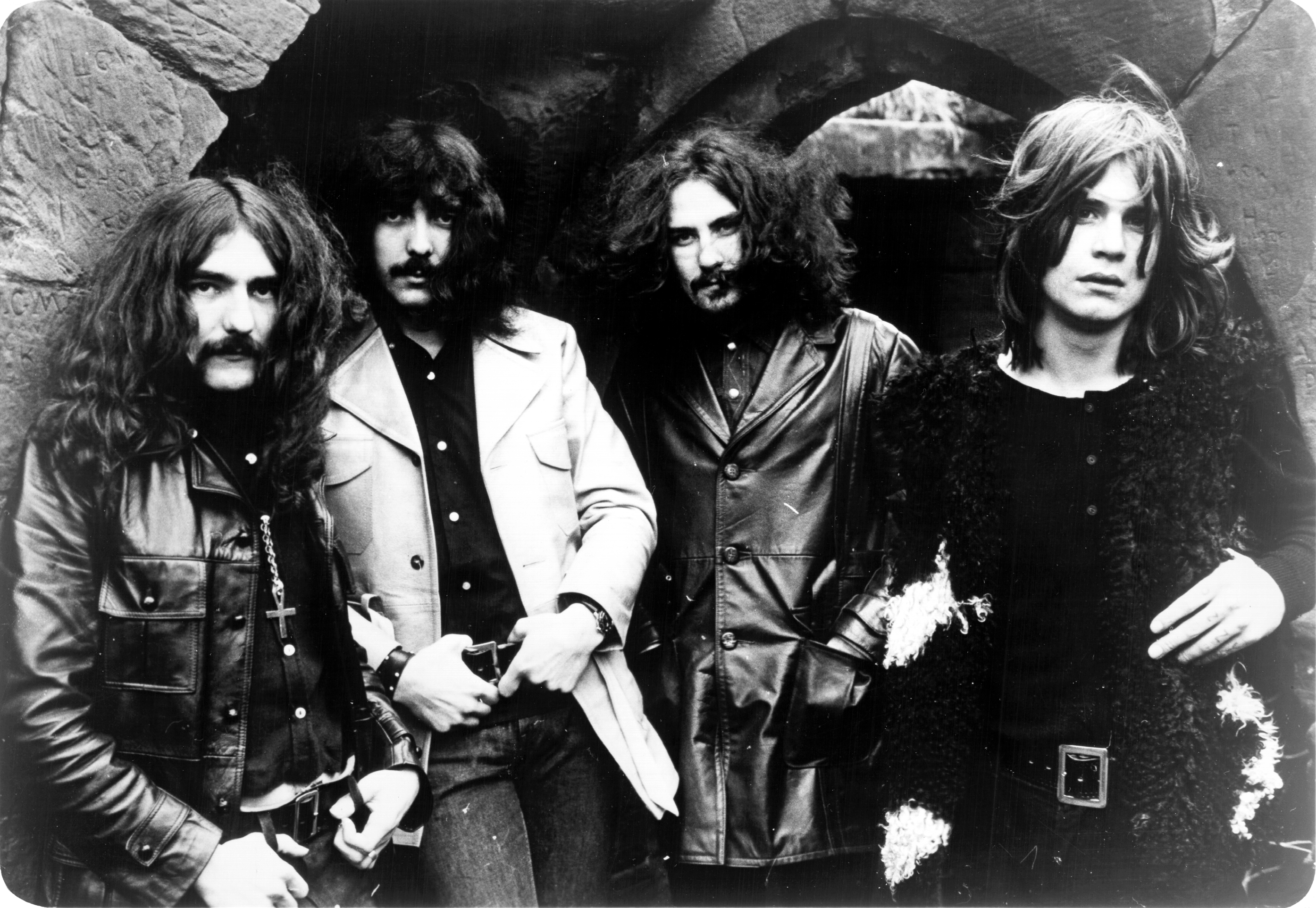
Electric Wizard's name was taken from two Black Sabbath songs.

The band adopted the name Electric Wizard during 1993, and featured guitarist-vocalist Jus Oborn, bassist Tim Bagshaw, and drummer Mark Greening. The band's name was taken from two Black Sabbath songs: "Electric Funeral" and "The Wizard". Oborn remarked, "Is the name Electric Wizard made out of two Black Sabbath song titles? Hahahaha, yeah it is!"

In 1995, the band signed to Rise Above Records and released their self-titled debut album. The music was in the vein of traditional doom metal, and received positive reviews. Later that year, they released the song "Demon Lung" as a split-single with Our Haunted Kingdom (later to become Orange Goblin).

In 1997, the band recorded and released Come My Fanatics…, which introduced the stoner and sludge elements that have come to define Electric Wizard's sound. Later that year, Man's Ruin Records released the Chrono.Naut EP. Following the release of Come My Fanatics... Electric Wizard released the Supercoven EP on Bad Acid Records in 1998 and then recorded and released Dopethrone in 2000, which was described by Allmusic as a "dirge masterpiece" and is regarded as the band's magnum opus. Kerrang! has noted that despite the "groovy" stoner rock vibes usually associated with the band, lyrics for songs like We Hate You were more like "an indiscriminate spray of bile against everyone" than the typical stoner rock themes of "shagging and cars".

During the three years following the release of Come My Fanatics..., the members of Electric Wizard encountered a series of setbacks, with Oborn suffering a collapsed eardrum during a concert and later severing a fingertip while laying a carpet. Greening broke his collarbone in an accident. Speaking to Kerrang! in July 2009, Jus Oborn remembered the days of the recording:

At the time, we were pretty bad people. I got arrested for arson of a car, outside a police station. Tim [Bagshaw] went to nick a crucifix off a church roof so we could use it onstage, then slipped, fell off through the window and sliced his arm open. He got community service for that. Then Mark [Greening] got nicked for robbing an offie. He smashed the window, nicked a bottle of whiskey, then sat there drinking it outside! We weren't very nice people, to be honest. We were feeding off that shit at the time. It made us feel like we were more of a heavy metal band.

Their next album, Let Us Prey, was released in 2002. It was Electric Wizard's most experimental record to date. Following the release, the band embarked on a North American tour that raised tensions between band members. It was announced that the band was breaking up after the last concert of the tour. However, Electric Wizard did a UK tour with Cathedral soon after, with Justin Greaves (of Iron Monkey) on drums. In April 2003, Greening and Bagshaw left the band.

=== Line-up changes and We Live (2003–2007) ===
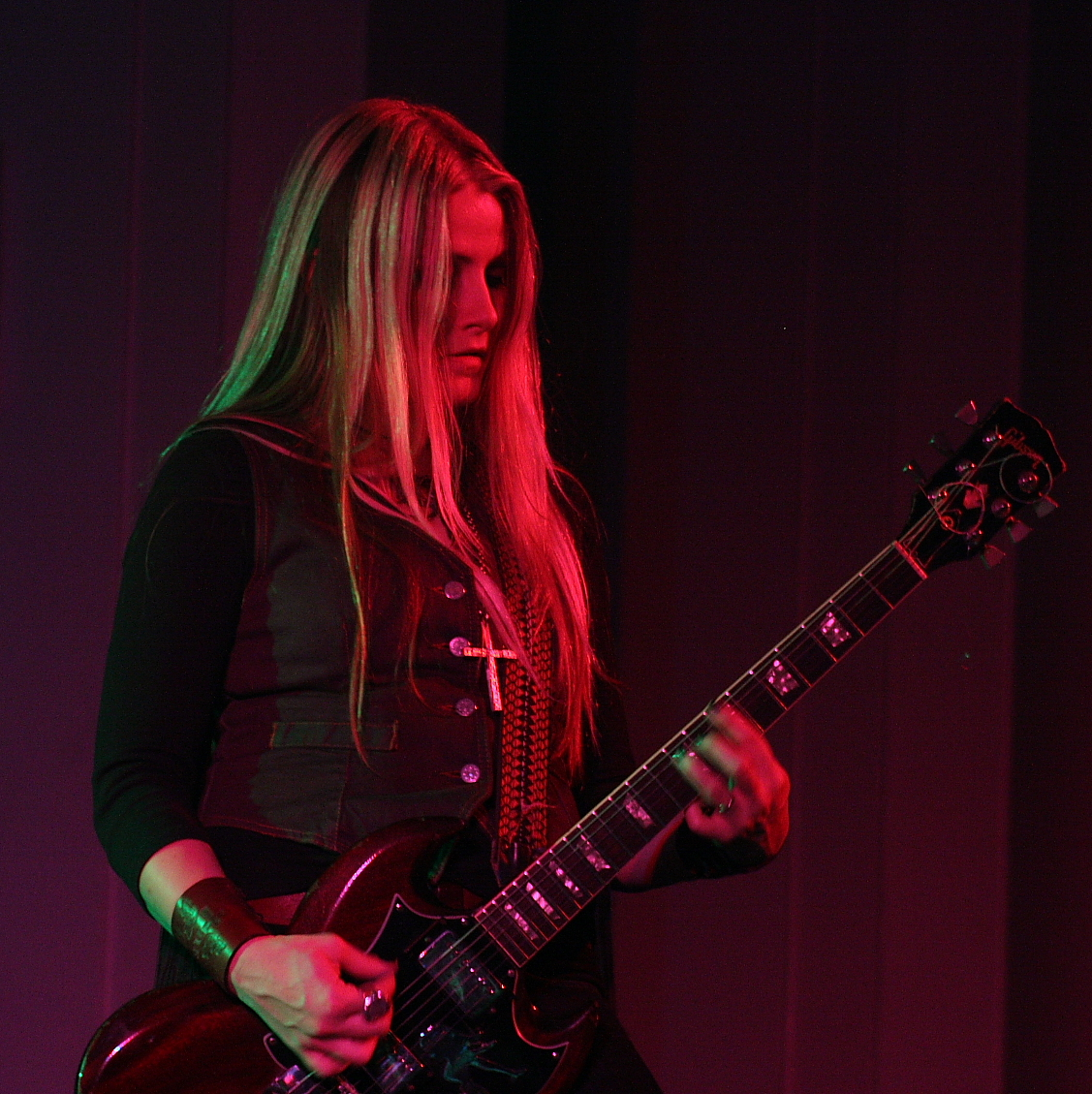
Liz Buckingham live at Damnation Festival 2009

In August 2003, Oborn revealed Electric Wizard's new line-up – drummer Greaves, second-guitarist Liz Buckingham (of 13 and Sourvein), and bassist Rob Al-Issa. This new lineup recorded We Live in 2004, just days after Buckingham began rehearsing with the band. As Oborn explained, the addition of Buckingham was crucial given the departure of his previous writing partner, Bagshaw:

(The addition of) Liz was the most important element...because Tim had left the band and we were writing partners so to speak. So when Liz came aboard we were writing partners again. Our styles were very similar. We have the same sort of down-stroke pattern. And since we were writing together, Electric Wizard was happening again. I have to have a writing partner.

The band toured England and Australia in support of the album and played at the 2005 Roadburn Festival. Greaves left the band in 2006 and was replaced by Shaun Rutter. The parting was not amicable, with Oborn remarking that "We fell out big time with that loser. You know, I would piss on his grave."

=== Witchcult Today, Black Masses and touring (2007–2012) ===
In November 2007, the band released Witchcult Today. In 2008, bassist Rob Al-Issa left the band and was replaced by Tas Danazoglou. Three years later, in November 2010, Electric Wizard released their seventh album: Black Masses.

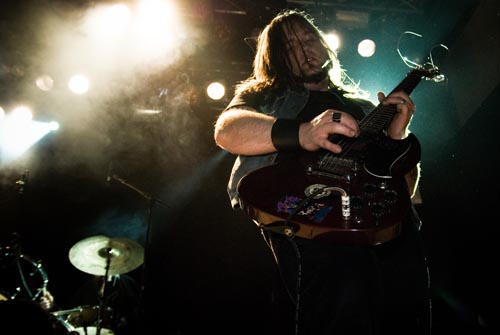
Jus Oborn performing at Hole in the Sky in 2007

On 31 March 2012, Electric Wizard played in London at the HMV Forum, debuting its newest members, bassist Glenn Charman and drummer Simon Poole. A 7-inch EP titled Legalise Drugs and Murder was available for sale at the show. After the gig it was announced that it would be released worldwide and that more EPs would follow. On 1 October 2012, some copies of Terrorizer came with a cassette EP of Legalise Drugs and Murder which contained the two songs from the 7-inch along with two outtakes and two new songs. Electric Wizard also headlined the 2012 edition of Maryland Deathfest on 27 May, their first show in the United States in ten years.

=== Label issues, Time to Die and Wizard Bloody Wizard (2013–present) ===
Electric Wizard headlined the 2013 edition of the Roadburn Festival called the Electric Acid Orgy, which was also curated by Oborn.

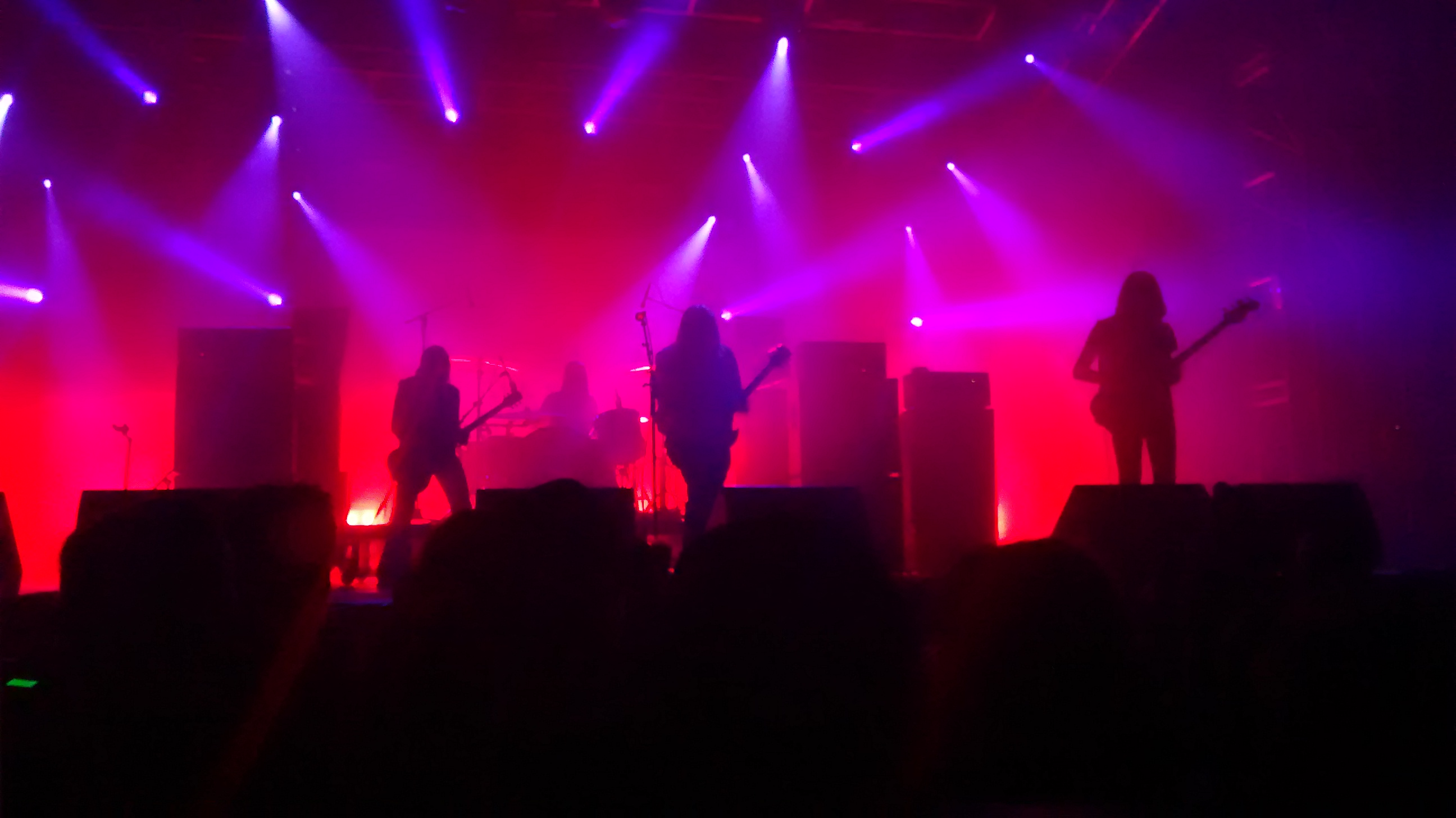
Electric Wizard live at Hellfest 2014

Electric Wizard announced that their eighth album, Time to Die, was to be released in 2014 on their own label Witchfinder Records via Spinefarm Records. It was recorded at Toerag Studios and Skyhammer Studios and mixed by Chris Fielding. The album was produced by guitarist Jus Oborn and released on 29 September 2014. The album is the first since 2002's Let Us Prey to feature founding member Mark Greening on drums.

On 30 October 2014, Electric Wizard played their largest club show in the North of England at the 1,500 capacity Ritz in Manchester, England. On 16 December 2014, Electric Wizard announced they would embark on a US/Canada tour in 2015, their first US shows since 2012 and full tour of the US since 2002. Tickets to the tour were sold out within a month after going on sale.

The band was set to release their latest album, Wizard Bloody Wizard in 2016, however this did not happen and in a September 2017 article Blabbermouth reported that the release date had been extended to 10 November 2017. The album was eventually released on 17 November 2017.

Clayton Burgess left Electric Wizard in early 2018 to focus on his band Satan's Satyrs. A single titled " L.S.D. (Lucifers Satanic Daughter)" was released in 2021, specifically for the film Lucifers Satanic Daughter. A band biography titled Come My Fanatics: A Journey into the World of Electric Wizard written by Dan Franklin was released on 22 June 2023. In 2024, the band released a live album called Black Magic Rituals & Perversions Vol. 1.

== Members ==
Current

- Jus Oborn – vocals, guitar (1988–present), bass (2003, 2008, 2012)
- Liz Buckingham – guitar, organ (2003–present)
- Simon Poole – drums (2012, 2014–present)
- Haz Wheaton – bass (2018–present)

Former

- Mark Greening – drums, organ (1988–2003, 2012–2014)
- Tim Bagshaw – bass (1988–2003)
- Rob Al-Issa – bass (2003–2008)
- Justin Greaves – drums (2003–2006)
- Shaun Rutter – drums (2006–2012)
- Tas Danazoglou – bass (2008–2012)
- Glenn Charman – bass (2012–2014)
- Clayton Burgess – bass (2014–2018)

== Discography ==
Studio albums

- Electric Wizard (1994)
- Come My Fanatics… (1997)
- Dopethrone (2000)
- Let Us Prey (2002)
- We Live (2004)
- Witchcult Today (2007)
- Black Masses (2010)
- Time to Die (2014)
- Wizard Bloody Wizard (2017)
