= The Music Cartel =

American record label

- Founded: 1998
- Founder: Eric Lemasters
- Defunct: 2005
- Genre: Heavy metal, rock, doom metal
- Country of origin: United States
- Location: Port Washington, New York

The Music Cartel was a record label based in Port Washington, New York and active between 1998 and 2005. It was founded by former Earache Records general manager Eric Lemasters. Many of their critically acclaimed releases – including prominent stoner rock records – were also released in Europe on Rise Above Records.

== Discography ==
- TMC001CD Industrial Fuckin Strength 2: Unleash the Brutality compilation CD
- TMC002CD Industrial Strength Anthology 1: The Lost Tracks compilation CD
- TMC003CD Transport League – Super Evil CD
- TMC004CD Codeseven – A Sense of Coalition CD
- TMC005CD I.D.K. – Till Death Do Us Part CD
- TMC006CD Leadfoot – Bring It On CD
- TMC007CD Peace, Love & Pitbulls – PLP3 CD
- TMC008CD Panacea – Twisted Designz CD
- TMC009CD Aura Anthropica – American Blindfold CD
- TMC010CD Lid – In the Mushroom CD
- TMC011CD Roachpowder – Viejo Diablo CD
- TMC012CD Sleep – Jerusalem CD
- TMC013CD Sounds from the Electronic Lounge compilation CD
- TMC014CD In the Groove compilation CD
- TMC015CD Sheavy – The Electric Sleep CD
- TMC016CD Orange Goblin – Time Travelling Blues CD
- TMC017CD Airport – Monostar CD
- TMC018CD Clawfinger – Clawfinger CD
- TMC019CD Terra Firma – Terra Firma CD
- TMC019 Terra Firma – Spiral Guru Pic Disc 7"
- TMC020CD Plastique – Empire of the Black Suns CD
- TMC021CD Electric Wizard – Come My Fanatics... CD
- TMC022CD Mammoth Volume – Mammoth Volume CD
- TMC023CD Codeseven – Division of Labour CD
- TMC024CD Clusterfuck compilation CD
- TMC025CD Zenith – Flowers of Intelligence CD
- TMC026CD Orange Goblin – Frequencies from Planet Ten CD
- TMC027CD Headcase – Mushiness CD
- TMC028CD Leadfoot – Take a Look CD
- TMC029CD Hangnail – Ten Days Before Summer CD
- TMC030CD Rise 13:Magick Rock Vol. 1 compilation CD
- TMC031CD Cathedral – In Memoriam CD
- TMC032CD Sally – Sally CD
- TMC033CD Clawfinger – Two Sides CD
- TMC034CD Hans Platzgumer – Datacard
- TMC035CD/LP Mammoth Volume – Noara Dance CD/LP
- TMC036CD/LP Orange Goblin – The Big Black CD/LP
- TMC037CD Sheavy – Celestial Hi-Fi CD
- TMC038CD Sea of Green – Northern Lights CD
- TMC039CD The Bronx Casket Co. – The Bronx Casket Company CD
- TMC040CD Dreadnaught – Down to Zero CD
- TMC041CD Firebird – Firebird CD
- TMC042CD Shallow – 16 Sunsets in 24 Hours CD
- TMC043CD Roachpowder – Atomic Church CD
- TMC044CD Electric Wizard – Dopethrone CD
- TMC045CD Sea of Green – Time to Fly CD
- TMC046CD Sloth – The Voice of God CD
- TMC047CD Deride – Scars of Time CD
- TMC048CD Hangnail – Clouds in the Head CD
- TMC049CD Mammoth Volume – Single Book of Songs CD
- TMC050CD Lenny Dee – IFS3: 667 Neighbor of the Beast 2CD
- TMC051CD Sons of Otis – Songs for Worship CD
- TMC052CD Goliath – Gate CD
- TMC053CD The Bronx Casket Co. – Sweet Home Transylvania CD
- TMC054CD Lenny Dee – Ruff Beats Records One Step Back 2CD
- TMC055CD Grand Magus – Grand Magus CD
- TMC056CD The Sabians – Beauty for Ashes CD
- TMC057CD Supersuckers – Splitsville 1 CD
- TMC058CD Mammoth Volume – Early Years CD
- TMC059CD Brant Bjork – Brant Bjork & the Operators CD
- TMC060LP Electric Wizard – Let Us Prey LP
- TMC061CD Orange Goblin – Coup de Grace CD
- TMC062CD Codeseven – The Rescue CD
- TMC063LP Sons of Otis – Untitled 10"
- TMC064CD The Last Drop – Where Were You Living a Year from Now? CD
- TMC065CD Rebirth of the Heavy compilation CD
- TMC066CD Deride – First Round Knockout CD
- TMC067CD Sheavy – Synchronized CD
- TMC068CD Lenny Dee – IFS4 - Chillin Is Killin 2CD
- TMC069CD Murder 1 – On High CD
- TMC070CD Sea of Green – Chemical Vacation CD
- TMC071CD Rondellus – Sabbatum: A Medieval Tribute to Black Sabbath CD
- TMC072CD Unearthly Trance – Season of Seance, Science of Silence CD
- TMC073CD Ufomammut – Snailking CD
- TMC074CD The Sabians – Shiver CD
- TMC075CD Dust to Dust – Sick CD
- TMC076CD Dirty Rig – Blood, Sweat and Beer CD
- TMC077CD/LP Grand Magus – Monument CD/LP
- TMC078CD Orange Goblin – Thieving from the House of God CD
- TMC079CD Rebirth of the Heavy Vol. II compilation CD
- TMC080CD Witchcraft – Witchcraft CD
- TMC081CD Electric Wizard – We Live CD
- TMC082CD Unearthly Trance – In the Red CD

== See also ==
- List of record labels
