= Capricorns (band) =

British progressive metal band

- Origin: London, England, UK
- Genres: Doom metal, sludge metal, progressive metal, instrumental
- Years active: 2003–2008, 2025-
- Label: Rise Above Records

Capricorns (sometimes stylized as CAPRICORNS) is an instrumental progressive metal band from London, mixing various elements of doom metal, sludge metal and math rock guitars. The band's lineup consisted of guitarist Nathan Dylan Bennett, guitarist Kevin Williams, bassist Dean Berry and drummer Nathan Perrier. They have been inspired by Italian horror and they feature ex-members of Orange Goblin and Iron Monkey.

== History ==
Capricorns formed in 2003. In 2005 they recorded their debut album "Ruder Forms Survive" following the release of their self-titled three-track EP (2004). 2005 was also the year they toured in the UK with Electric Wizard. In 2008 they released their second full album "River, Bear Your Bones" on Rise Above Records based at the time in multiple geographical locations and in the same year they disbanded. The band are billed to play their first show in eighteen years at the 2026 edition of Desertfest London.

== Band members ==
- Chris Cates (guitar)
- Nathan Dylan Bennett (guitar)
- Kevin Williams (guitar)
- Dean Berry (bass)
- Nathan Perrier (drums)
- Christopher Turner (drums)
- Javier Villegas (bass)
- Chris West (bass)
- Anthony Dearlove (bass)

== Discography ==
=== Studio albums ===
| Title | Released | Format | Label |
|---|---|---|---|
| Ruder Forms Survive | 2005 | CD, LP | Rise Above Records |
| River, Bear Your Bones | 2008 | CD, LP | Rise Above Records |

=== Other works ===
| Title | Released | Format | Label |
|---|---|---|---|
| Capricorns | 2004 | CD, EP | Rise Above Records |
