= Healing Through Fire =

Studio album by Orange Goblin
- Released: 21 May 2007
- Recorded: December 2006 – March 2007
- Genres: Stoner metal, heavy metal
- Length: 43:46
- Labels: Sanctuary, Mayan
- Producer: Mark Daghorn

Orange Goblin chronology
Thieving from the House of God (2004)	Healing Through Fire (2007)	A Eulogy for the Damned (2012)

Professional ratings
Review scores
Source	Rating
AllMusic	2.5/5 stars
kvltsite.com	5/5 stars

Healing Through Fire is the sixth studio album by English stoner metal band Orange Goblin, released in 2007. This is their first album released on Sanctuary Records, and their first not to be released by Rise Above Records. Ben Ward said of the album:

"It's not a concept album at all, but we are using the theme of the Great Plague of London and the Great Fire that followed for a lot of lyrical and musical influence. It's definitely the strongest material we have written".

A limited number of copies came with a bonus DVD. The DVD features a live set recorded at The Mean Fiddler in London on 16 December 2006 and also includes some interviews and studio footage.

== Track listing ==
All songs written and arranged by Orange Goblin (Ben Ward, Joe Hoare, Martyn Millard, Chris Turner).

1. "The Ballad of Solomon Eagle" – 5:18
2. "Vagrant Stomp" – 4:10
3. "The Ale House Braves" – 3:50
4. "Cities of Frost" 5:35
5. "Hot Knives and Open Sores" – 4:22
6. "Hounds Ditch" – 5:30
7. "Mortlake (Dead Water)" 2:11
8. "They Come Back (Harvest of Skulls)" – 4:44
9. "Beginners Guide to Suicide" – 8:06

=== Live DVD ===
1. "Some You Win, Some You Lose"
2. "Quincy the Pig Boy"
3. "Getting High on the Bad Times"
4. "The Ballad of Solomon Eagle"
5. "Hot Magic Red Planet"
6. "Round Up the Horses"
7. "They Come Back"
8. "Your World Will Hate This"
9. "Blue Snow"
10. "Scorpionica"

== Personnel ==
=== Orange Goblin ===
- Ben Ward: vocals
- Joe Hoare: guitars
- Martyn Millard: bass
- Chris Turner: drums

Additional personnel

- Jason Graham: keyboards

Production

- Produced, engineered and mixed by Mark Daghorn
- Mastered by Andy Pearce

== Trivia ==
The art for the audio disc incorporated the Latin phrase "Nam ut quisque est vir optimus, ita difficillime esse alios improbos suspicatur", written on the outer edge. This phrase is from the writings of Cicero, a Roman orator, and can be translated as "The more virtuous any man is, the less easily does he suspect others to be vicious."
