= The Lick on the Tip of an Envelope Yet to Be Sent =

Studio album by Circulus
- Released: 2005
- Genre: Psychedelic folk
- Length: 39:12
- Label: Rise Above Records
- Producer: Mark Daghorn, Circulus

Circulus chronology
| Giantism EP (1999) | The Lick on the Tip of an Envelope Yet to Be Sent (2005) | Clocks Are Like People (2006) |

Professional ratings
Review scores
| Source | Rating |
|---|---|
| AllMusic | 4/5 stars |

The Lick on the Tip of an Envelope Yet to Be Sent is the debut full-length album by psychedelic folk band Circulus.

== Track listing ==
1. "Miri It Is" - 2:36
2. "My Body Is Made of Sunlight" - 3:54
3. "The Scarecrow" - 4:56
4. "Orpheus" - 3:07
5. "We Are Long Lost" - 5:34
6. "Swallow" - 3:59
7. "The Aphid" - 5:19
8. "Candlelight" - 3:28
9. "Power to the Pixies" - 6:14

== Personnel ==
- Michael Tyack - vocals, guitar, saz, cittern
- Lo Polidoro - vocals, harmonium
- Sam Kelly - vocals, drums
- Oliver Parfitt - keyboards, moog
- George Parfitt - bass guitar
- Victor Hugo - bongo
- Will Summers - flute, recorder, crumhorn, rausch pfiffer

=== Guest appearance ===
- Marianne Segal - vocals and guitar on "Swallow"
