= Frequencies from Planet Ten =

Studio album by Orange Goblin
- Released: 1 October 1997
- Recorded: March 1996 – March 1997
- Studios: The Square Center, Nottingham, and Rhythm, Stratford
- Genre: Heavy metal
- Length: 47:21
- Labels: Rise Above, The Music Cartel
- Producer: Dave Chang

Orange Goblin chronology
| Electric Wizard/Our Haunted Kingdom (1996) | Frequencies from Planet Ten (1997) | Nuclear Guru (1997) |

Professional ratings
Review scores
| Source | Rating |
|---|---|
| AllMusic | 3/5 stars |

Frequencies from Planet Ten is the debut studio album by English heavy metal band Orange Goblin. It was released in 1997 by Rise Above Records. In 2002, it was reissued as a double CD coupled with their second album, Time Travelling Blues (1998). The reissue version contains two bonus tracks, both taken from their Man's Ruin EP, Nuclear Guru. The latter bonus track is a cover of Black Sabbath's "Hand of Doom". The original Japanese press also contains these two bonus tracks.

Both "Saruman's Wish" and "Lothlorian" have their basis in J. R. R. Tolkien's epic fantasy The Lord of the Rings. Saruman is an evil wizard and Lothlórien is a mythical forest which is home to a race of elves.

== Track listing ==
| No. | Title | Length |
|---|---|---|
| 1. | "The Astral Project" | 6:49 |
| 2. | "Magic Carpet" | 3:19 |
| 3. | "Saruman's Wish" | 6:04 |
| 4. | "Song of the Purple Mushroom Fish" | 2:33 |
| 5. | "Aquatic Fanatic" | 4:20 |
| 6. | "Lothlorian" | 1:26 |
| 7. | "Land of Secret Dreams" | 7:38 |
| 8. | "Orange Goblin" | 5:33 |
| 9. | "Star Shaped Cloud (ends at 7:05. After 1 minute and 30 seconds of silence, at 8:35 begins a hidden track.)" | 9:39 |

== Personnel ==
- Ben Ward – vocals
- Pete O'Malley – guitar
- Joe Hoare – guitar
- Martyn Millard – bass
- Duncan Gibbs – keyboards
- Chris Turner – drums
