= Nuclear Guru =

EP by Orange Goblin
- Released: November 1997
- Recorded: 1997
- Genre: Stoner metal
- Label: Man's Ruin Records

Orange Goblin chronology
Frequencies from Planet Ten (1997)	Nuclear Guru (1997)	Chrono.Naut/Nuclear Guru (1997)

Professional ratings
Review scores
Source	Rating
AllMusic	2.5/5 stars

Nuclear Guru is an EP by English stoner metal band Orange Goblin, released in 1997 on Man's Ruin Records. It was released on 10" vinyl and later released as a split CD with Electric Wizard entitled Chrono.Naut/Nuclear Guru. The tracks can also be found on the Japanese edition of Frequencies from Planet Ten and the 2CD of said album & Time Travelling Blues. "Hand of Doom" is a Black Sabbath cover. The cover art features a distorted image of Shoko Asahara, leader of the Japanese cult Aum Shinrikyo.

== Track listing ==
1. "Nuclear Guru" – 6:47
2. "Hand of Doom" (Black Sabbath) – 7:02
