= Grand Junction =

Grand Junction may refer to:

== Places ==
=== United States ===
- Grand Junction, Colorado
  - Grand Junction Metropolitan Statistical Area, an alternate designation for Mesa County, Colorado
- Grand Junction, Iowa
- Grand Junction, Michigan
- Grand Junction, Tennessee

=== United Kingdom ===
- Grand Junction Isle, a small island in the River Thames

== Transportation ==
=== Rail ===
- Grand Junction, Birmingham, a railway junction in Birmingham, England
- Grand Junction Railroad and Depot Company, in the Boston, Massachusetts area
  - Grand Junction Railroad Bridge, across the Charles River
- Grand Junction Railway, in England
- Grand Junction Railway (Ontario), in Canada
- Grand Junction station, a train station in Grand Junction, Colorado

=== Other ===
- Grand Junction Canal, in England
- Grand Junction Regional Airport, in Mesa County, Colorado
- Grand Junction Road, through Adelaide, South Australia

== Other ==
- Grand Junction, an Australian country music band
- Grand Junction Daily Sentinel, a daily newspaper in western Colorado
- Grand Junction High School a public high school in Grand Junction, Colorado
- Grand Junction Junior College, a campus of Colorado Mesa University in Grand Junction, Colorado
- Grand Junction milkvetch, the common name for Astragalus linifolius, a species of flowering plant in the legume family
- Grand Junction Rockies, a Pioneer League baseball team
- Grand Junction Waterworks Company, a utility company supplying water to parts of London, England

== See also ==
- Grand union (disambiguation)
