= Circulus (band) =

English folk band

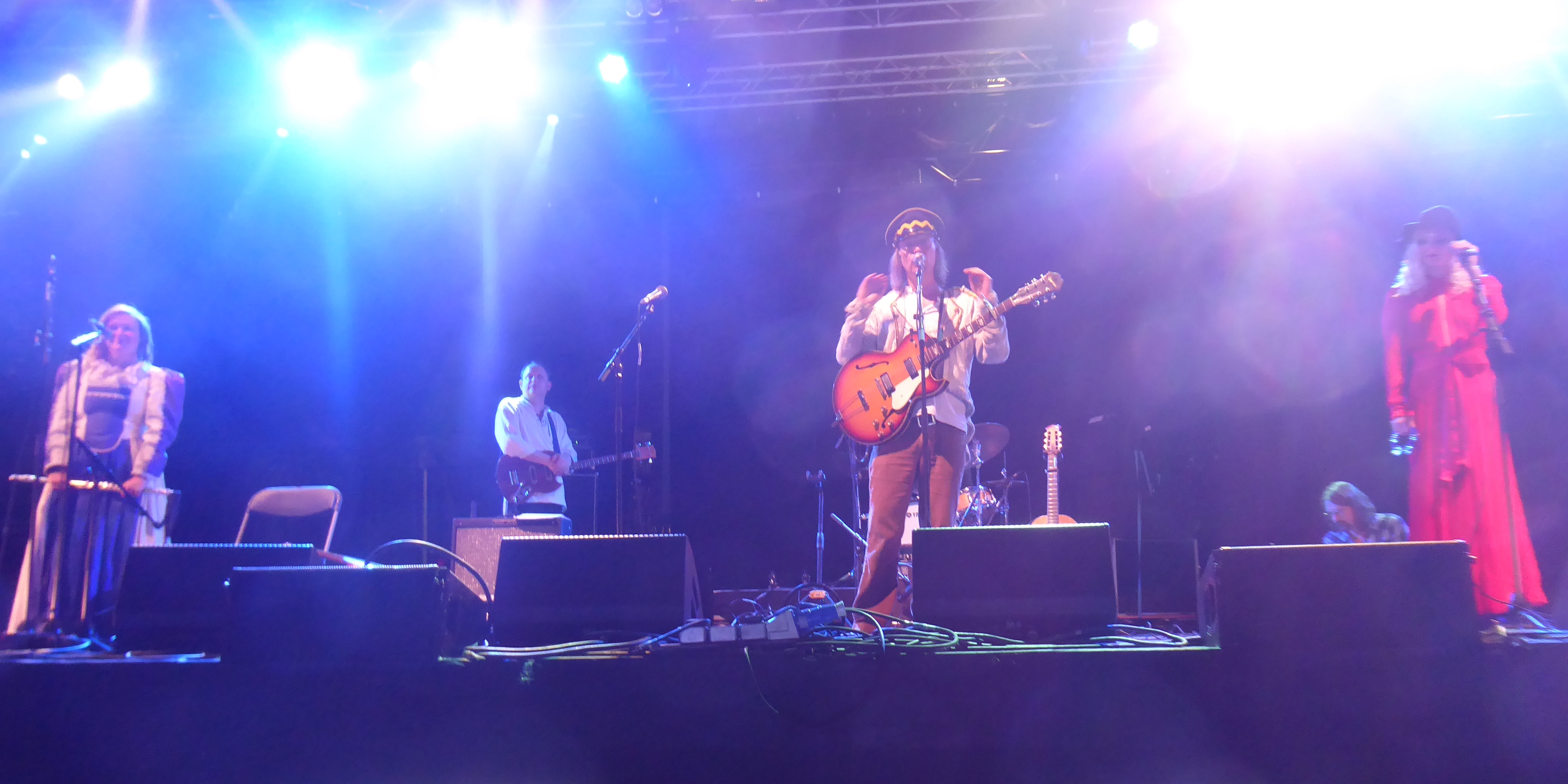
- Circulus at Green Man Festival, 2017

Background information
- Origin: London, England
- Genres: Psychedelic folk; progressive folk
- Years active: 1997–present
- Labels: Instant Farma; Rise Above; Mythical Cake
- Members: Michael Tyack; Jennifer Bennett; Oliver Parfitt; George Parfitt
- Past members: Will Summers; Lo Polidoro; Sam Kelly; Victor Hugo; Eric Anholm; Jason Hobart; Emma Steele; Robin Cieslak; Tom Goldsmith; Holly-Jane Shears; Antony Elvin; Alan French; Damien Cavanagh

Circulus are a psychedelic/progressive folk band from South London, England, founded by guitarist and singer Michael Tyack.

The band uses a mix of modern and medieval instruments, such as the lute, cittern, crumhorn and rauschpfeife, along with the Moog synthesizer, bass and electric guitars.

Circulus were featured in a two-page spread of an NME issue in 2005, also appearing that year in a Sveriges Television music documentary called This Is Our Music in 2005. They were interviewed on BBC2's The Culture Show on 3 February 2007, as part of an item on the 'new folk'.

Mojo magazine chose Circulus to cover Lucy in the Sky with Diamonds for their 40th anniversary Sgt. Pepper's Lonely Hearts Club Band tribute album, Sgt. Pepper... With a Little Help from His Friends, given away with their March 2007 issue.

The band performed on the 'Meltdown on the Thames' stage, at Meltdown Festival on 17 June 2007, one week later playing on the Park Stage at Glastonbury Festival. They performed at Green Man Festival in 2006 and 2017.

In 2013, they provivded an original music soundtrack for the short film Eilmer The Flying Monk, which is based on the story of Eilmer of Malmesbury. In 2014 their music was used in the soundtrack of the documentary The Truth Behind the Dash For Gas.

== Discography ==
EPs

- Giantism (1999, Instant Farma)

Albums

- The Lick on the Tip of an Envelope Yet to Be Sent (2005, Rise Above Records)
- Clocks Are Like People (2006, Rise Above Records)
- Thought Becomes Reality (2009, Mythical Cake)
- Birth (2018, Mythical Cake)
- Gate 47 (2018, Mythical Cake)
- Live at Dingwalls 2005 (2019, Mythical Cake)

Singles

- "Everyone" / "Ring o' Roses" / "Gently Johnny Pt 1" (1997, Instant Farma)
- "Little More Time" / "Happen Away" (1998, Instant Farma)
- "Wouldn't Dream of Sleeping Now" / "Same Way From the Sun" (2000, Instant Farma)
- "Swallow" / "My Body is Made of Sunlight" / "La Rotta°" (2005, Rise Above Records))
- "Song of Our Despair" / "Honeycomb" / "Tapestry°" (2006, Rise Above Records)

(° on CD version only)

Other releases

- Music Plays in the Air (on Get Yer Pots Out with the fanzine Ptolemaic Terrascope, 2001)
- Split 7" – Miri It Is (Moog-up Mix) by Circulus / Chylde of Fire by Witchcraft (2005, Rise Above Records)
- La Rotta (2005) (on The Crow Club compilation, 2008 People Tree Records)
- Lucy in the Sky With Diamonds (Mojo Presents Sgt. Pepper... With A Little Help From My Friends, 2007, Mojo Magazine)
- The Unquiet Grave (on Old Wine, New Skins compilation, 2007, Market Square Music)
- Till We Merry Meet Again (on A Psychedelic Guide to Monsterism Island compilation, 2009, Lo Recordings)

Releases with Circulus members

- Lo Polidoro – Lo Polidoro (2005)
- Lo Polidoro – Le Carrousel Des Jours (2009, Marboz Records)
- Marianne Segal – The Gathering (2007, Snow Beach Records) produced by Michael Tyack and featuring Circulus
- Thistletown – Rosemarie (2008, Big Bertha Records) produced by Michael Tyack

== Band members ==
=== Current members ===
- Michael Tyack – vocals, guitars, saz, cittern
- Jenny Bliss Bennett – violin, viola da gamba, flute, vocals
- George Parfitt – bass guitar, drums, percussion
- Oliver Parfitt – keyboards, synthesizers

=== Former members ===
- Lo Polidoro – vocals
- Will Summers – flute, recorder, crumhorn, shawm
- Sam Kelly – drums, vocals
- Victor Hugo Llamas – bongos, percussion
- Eric Anholm – guitar, vocals
- Jason Hobart – bass, vocals
- Emma Steele – vocals, flute
- Robin Cieslak – guitar, vocals, percussion
- Damien Cavanagh - drums

== Mythical Cake label ==
In 2008, the band started its own record label, Mythical Cake, using donations solicited from fans and the public at large. A donation of 50 British pounds or more secured a photograph in the Thought Becomes Reality album liner notes. This alternative appeal is part of a growing trend of bands attempting to create a distribution infrastructure outside the traditional music industry.
