= Grand Union =

Grand Union may refer to:

== Transport ==
- Grand union, a four-way, double track rail junction often found on tram systems
- Grand Union Canal, a canal running from London to Birmingham in England
  - Grand Union Canal (old), a former canal in England, now forms a branch of the bigger Grand Union Canal
- Grand Central (train operating company), a train operating company in England that at one stage proposed trading as Grand Union Railway
- Grand Union (train operating company), a prospective train operating company

== Entertainment ==
- Grand Union Orchestra, a London world jazz ensemble
- Grand Union (dance group), a former New York dance group
- Grand Union (Firebird album), 2009
- Grand Union (Frank Tovey album), 1991

== Other uses ==
- Grand Union flag, the first national flag of the United States
- Grand Union of 1256
- Grand Union (supermarket), an American supermarket chain
- Grand Union (short story collection), a 2019 short story collection by Zadie Smith

== See also ==
- Grand Junction (disambiguation)
