= The Machine That Won the War =

The Machine that Won the War may refer to:

- "The Machine That Won the War" (short story), a 1961 short story by Isaac Asimov
- The Machine That Won the War (album), a 2007 album by Sheavy
