= Dog Days (EP) =

EP by Goatsnake
- Released: 2000
- Recorded: 1997–1999
- Genre: Stoner metal
- Length: 26:14
- Label: Southern Lord Records (SUNN05)

Goatsnake chronology
Goatsnake/Burning Witch (2000)	Dog Days (2000)	Flower of Disease (2000)

Professional ratings
Review scores
Source	Rating
AllMusic	2.5/5 stars

Dog Days is an EP by American doom metal band Goatsnake, released in 2000 via Southern Lord Records. It consists of material recorded from 1997 to 1999. It was re-pressed by Southern Lord in 2004 on vinyl only and limited to 500 copies. The re-press includes a cover of Black Sabbath's "Who Are You". Also in 2004, Southern Lord repackaged the EP with Goatsnake Vol. 1 on a single CD.

== Track listing ==
No.	Title	Length
1.	"The Orphan"	5:02
2.	"Long Gone"	2:50
3.	"Heartbreaker" (Free cover)	6:38
4.	"Raw Curtains"	7:28
5.	"Man of Light"	4:16

Vinyl repress bonus track
No.	Title	Length
6.	"Who Are You" (Black Sabbath cover)
