= Orange Goblin/Alabama Thunderpussy =

EP split by Orange Goblin and Alabama Thunderpussy
- Released: 2000
- Genre: Stoner metal
- Label: Eccentric Man

Orange Goblin chronology
Time Travelling Blues (1998)	Orange Goblin/Alabama Thunderpussy (2000)	The Big Black (2000)

Alabama Thunderpussy chronology
Constellation (2000)	Orange Goblin/Alabama Thunderpussy (2000)	Staring at the Divine (2002)

Orange Goblin/Alabama Thunderpussy is a split EP by heavy metal bands Orange Goblin and Alabama Thunderpussy, released via Eccentric Man Records in 2000. Both bands contributed a cover version of a 1970s hard rock/proto metal band; Orange Goblin covered Leaf Hound while Alabama Thunderpussy covered Captain Beyond. The album art is an engraving of Stede Bonnet from the 1724 book A General History of the Pyrates.

== Track listing ==
=== Orange Goblin ===
1. "Freelance Fiend" (Leaf Hound)

=== Alabama Thunderpussy ===
1. "Can't Feel Nothing" (Captain Beyond)

== Personnel ==
- Joe Horae – guitar
- Pete O'Malley – guitar
- Martyn Millard – bass guitar
- Chris Turner – drums
- Ben Ward – vocals
