= Ben Ward (singer) =

British musician

- Born: Ben Ward; 2 December 1974 (age 51); Newcastle upon Tyne, United Kingdom
- Genres: Rock; heavy metal
- Occupations: Singer; musician; songwriter; businessman
- Years active: 1994-present
- Label: Candlelight Records
- Member of: Orange Goblin

Ben Ward (born 2 December 1974) is a British musician who has been the singer of Orange Goblin since 1997.

Ward had wanted to become a footballer for Queens Park Rangers, but, inspired by Lemmy and Bruce Dickinson, “discovered heavy metal, booze and drugs, so football fell by the wayside”. Ward helped found Our Haunted Kingdom in 1994 and they evolved into Orange Goblin in 1997. He has been their singer ever since, recording ten studio albums with the band.

Between 2007 and 2010, Ward was a member of Ravens Creed. He sang on one of their albums.

In 2016 Ward set up a Just Giving campaign for 73 Team Rock employees, who he thought were being unfairly treated by being threatened with redundancy. Ward is also the founder of Route One Booking Agency.

Ward stopped drinking alcohol in 2022 because "It was spiralling out of control".

In January 2025, it was announced that Orange Goblin will split at the end of that year's tour because "now is the right time for us to focus our attention on our families and other interests outside the band", though they may reunite.
