= Teeth of Lions Rule the Divine =

English drone doom supergroup

- Origin: Nottingham, United Kingdom
- Genres: Drone metal, doom metal
- Years active: 2001
- Labels: Southern Lord, Rise Above
- Members: Lee Dorrian; Stephen O'Malley; Greg Anderson; Justin Greaves
- Website: Southern Lord page

Teeth of Lions Rule the Divine is an English drone doom supergroup, formed in 2001 with musicians from other metal bands.

The name is taken from the second song from the Earth album Earth 2. The music is slow and heavy, similar to the music of Khanate and Burning Witch.

== Band members ==
- Lee Dorrian – vocals (Cathedral, Napalm Death)
- Stephen O'Malley – guitar (Khanate, Sunn O))), Burning Witch, Thorr's Hammer)
- Greg Anderson – bass guitar, organ (Goatsnake, Sunn O))), Burning Witch, Thorr's Hammer)
- Justin Greaves – drums (Iron Monkey, Electric Wizard, Crippled Black Phoenix)

== Discography ==
- Rampton – 2002 (Southern Lord Records/Rise Above Records)
