= Coup de Grace (Orange Goblin album) =

Studio album by Orange Goblin
- Released: 25 June 2002
- Recorded: 8–28 October 2001 at New Rising Studios, Peldon, Essex
- Genre: Heavy metal, stoner metal
- Length: 51:14
- Label: Rise Above, The Music Cartel
- Producer: Scott Reeder

Orange Goblin chronology
| The Big Black (2000) | Coup de Grace (2002) | Thieving from the House of God (2004) |

Professional ratings
Review scores
| Source | Rating |
|---|---|
| AllMusic | 3/5 stars |

Coup De Grace is the fourth studio album by English stoner metal band Orange Goblin, released in 2002 on Rise Above Records and The Music Cartel. Guest appearances include John Garcia of Kyuss and Tom Davies of Nebula.

In late January 2011, Rise Above Records reissued the album in a digipack form containing three bonus tracks; No Law (taken from the earlier High Times release), No Class (Motörhead cover) and Freelance Fiend (Leafhound cover).

== Track listing ==
| No. | Title | Length |
|---|---|---|
| 1. | "Your World Will Hate This" | 1:57 |
| 2. | "Monkey Panic" | 3:42 |
| 3. | "Rage of Angels" | 4:26 |
| 4. | "Made of Rats" | 5:36 |
| 5. | "Whiskey Leech" | 4:01 |
| 6. | "Getting High on the Bad Times" | 4:33 |
| 7. | "Graviton" | 4:11 |
| 8. | "Red Web" | 5:13 |
| 9. | "Born with Big Hands" | 4:25 |
| 10. | "Jesus Beater" | 4:30 |
| 11. | "We Bite" (Misfits) | 1:19 |
| 12. | "Stinkin' o' Gin" | 7:21 |

== Personnel ==
- Ben Ward – vocals
- Pete O'Malley – guitar
- Martyn Millard – bass
- Chris Turner – drums
- Joe Hoare – guitar

=== Guest musicians ===
- John Garcia – lead vocals on "Made of Rats" and "Jesus Beater"
- Tom Davies – backing vocals on "Monkey Panic"

== Notes ==
- "We Bite" is a cover of a Misfits song originally released on the Die, Die My Darling EP in 1984.
- "Your World Will Hate This" is featured on the 2003 video game Tony Hawk's Underground.
- Man's Ruin Records founder Frank Kozik, who had released past Orange Goblin records, produced the album's artwork.
