= Lucifer Songs =

Studio album by Ufomammut
- Released: 2005
- Venue: SOMS Sarezzano (AL)
- Studio: DIY recording
- Genre: Experimental metal
- Length: 65:56
- Label: Rocket Recordings; Supernatural Cat

Ufomammut chronology
Snailking (2004)	Lucifer Songs (2005)	Idolum (2008)

Lucifer Songs is the third album by the Italian experimental metal band Ufomammut, released in 2005.

== Track list ==
No.	Title	Length
1.	"Blind"	5:14
2.	"Hellcore"	5:10
3.	"Hypnotized"	2:03
4.	"Mars"	5:39
5.	"Astrodronaut"	5:39
6.	"Lucifer Song" (ends at 10:40; hidden track at 41:43)	42:14
Total length:		65:56
