= Rise Above Records =

English independent record label

- Founder: Lee Dorrian
- Distributor: All That is Heavy
- Genre: Doom metal; hardcore punk
- Country of origin: United Kingdom
- Location: London, England
- Official website: riseaboverecords.com

Rise Above Records is a London-based independent record label owned by Lee Dorrian, former member of Cathedral and Napalm Death.

== Founding ==
Lee Dorrian started Rise Above Records in 1988 without the intention of the label being an ongoing position. It was during the same year that he had left his previous band, Napalm Death. Dorrian explained that it was predominantly done to "get the dole off my back as they were asking a lot of questions as Napalm Death were on the front cover of the NME and on TV three times in one week, but I was still living in a council flat and couldn't even afford the rent."

Rise Above Records was initially started up on the Enterprise Allowance Scheme, a Conservative government initiative which fronted cash to young entrepreneurs.

== Style ==
Dorrian's initial intention was to release hardcore punk music and limited edition releases. The label was named after the Black Flag song of the same name. The first release from the label was a Napalm Death live EP (Extended play) followed by releases from bands such as S.O.B. and Long Cold Stare.

Dorrian was a fan of bands such as Candlemass, Saint Vitus and Trouble but stated there "wasn't really a 'doom scene' as such" and that "doom became an obsession" for him. Finding that there were a scattered amount of doom metal groups in the United States (specifically Maryland), Dorrian attempted to "give the scene a boost" and released a compilation titled Dark Passages, a compilation stating that "if people asked what doom was you could point to that record and there was something tangible to grab hold of." Dorrian found that the release "didn't get as many bands as we'd have liked, hence the reason why there are two Cathedral tracks on there." Dorrian admitted later that it took until 1997 "that a new wave of doom bands started to appear. Ever [sic] since then it's become really strong." Dorrian specifically noted Electric Wizard's Come My Fanatics... as being "the turning point of everything."

== Artists ==
=== Current artists ===
- Angel Witch
- Antisect
- Age Of Taurus
- ASTRA
- Beastmaker
- Blood Ceremony
- Church of Misery
- Death Penalty
- Diagonal
- Gentlemans Pistols
- Galley Beggar
- Hidden Masters
- Horisont
- Saturn
- Septic Tank
- Twin Temple
- Uncle Acid & the Deadbeats
- Witchsorrow
- Workshed

=== Former artists ===
- Bang
- Bottom
- Capricorns
- Cathedral
- Chrome Hoof
- Circulus
- Comus
- Debris Inc.
- Electric Wizard
- Firebird
- Goatsnake
- Ghost
- The Gates of Slumber
- Grand Magus
- Hangnail
- Incredible Hog
- The Iron Maiden (Note: This band is not the same as the more commercially successful band Iron Maiden. This band was active in the late 1960s and 1970, and had a sound that was inspired by Cream and jazz music, and was considered a "proto-doom metal" act. Rise Above Relics released a compilation album of their works titled Maiden Voyage, while marketing the band as "The Original Iron Maiden".)
- The Last Drop
- Leaf Hound
- Long Cold Stare
- Lucifer
- Mourn
- Moss
- Napalm Death
- Naevus
- The Oath
- Orange Goblin
- Pentagram
- Penance
- Pod People
- Purson
- Revelation
- Sally
- Sea of Green
- Serpentcult
- Shallow
- sHEAVY
- Sleep
- S.O.B.
- Sunn O)))
- Taint
- Teeth of Lions Rule the Divine
- Unearthly Trance
- Witchcraft

== Discography ==
=== Main releases ===
- RISE 001 - Napalm Death Live - 7-inch EP (vinyl only)
- RISE 002 - S.O.B. Thrash Night - 7-inch EP (vinyl only)
- RISE 003 - Long Cold Stare - Tired Eyes LP (vinyl only)
- RISE 004 - S.O.B. - What's the Truth LP/MC/CD
- RISE 005 - Various Artists - Dark Passages LP/MC/CD
- RISE 006 - Revelation - Salvations Answer LP/MC/CD
- RISE 007 - Penance - The Road Less Travelled LP/MC/CD
- RISE 008 - Cathedral - In Memorium CD/Maxi EP (Ltd only purple vinyl)
- RISE 009 - Electric Wizard - Electric Wizard CD/LP (Ltd only green vinyl)
- RISE 010 - Mourn - Mourn CD
- RISE 011 - Electric Wizard/Our Haunted Kingdom split 7-inch
- RISE 012 - Various Artists - Dark Passages II - CD
- CDRISE 13 - Various Artists - Magick Rock vol. 1 CD
- CDRISE 14 - Electric Wizard - Come My Fanatics... CD
- CDRISE 15 - Orange Goblin - Frequencies from Planet Ten CD
- CDRISE 16 - Naevus - Sun Meditation CD
- CDRISE 17 - sHEAVY - The Electric Sleep CD
- CDRISE 18 - Orange Goblin - Time Travelling Blues CD
- CDRISE 19 - Sleep - Jerusalem CD
- CDRISE 20 - Electric Wizard - Come My Fanatics.../Electric Wizard 2×CD
- CDRISE 21 - Cathedral - In Memoriam CD
- CDRISE 22 - Goatsnake - Goatsnake Vol. 1 CD
- CDRISE 23 - Hangnail - Ten Days Before Summer CD
- CDRISE 24 - Sally - Sally CD
- CDRISE 25 - Orange Goblin - The Big Black CD/LP
- CDRISE 26 - sHEAVY - Celestial Hi-Fi CD
- CDRISE 27 - Electric Wizard - Dopethrone CD
- CDRISE 28 - Shallow - 16 Sunsets in 24 Hours CD
- CDRISE 29 - Sunn O))) ØØ Void CD
- CDRISE 30 - Goatsnake - Flower of Disease CD
- CDRISE 31 - Firebird - Firebird CD
- RISECD 32 - Hangnail - Clouds in the Head CD
- RISECD 33 - Sea of Green - Time to Fly CD
- RISECD 34 - Grand Magus - Grand Magus CD
- RISECD 35 - The Last Drop - Where Were You Living One Year from Now? CD
- RISECD/LP 36 - Electric Wizard - Let Us Prey CD/LP
- RISECD 37 - Orange Goblin - Coup de Grace (CD)
- RISECD 38 - Orange Goblin - Time Travelling Blues/Frequencies From Planet Ten 2×CD
- RISECD 39 - sHEAVY - Synchronized CD
- RISECD 40 - sHEAVY - The Electric Sleep/Blue Sky Mind 2×CD
- RISECD 41 - Teeth of Lions Rule the Divine - Rampton CD
- RISECD 42 - Bottom - Feels So Good When You're Gone CD
- RISECD 43 - Sally - C-Earth CD
- RISECD/LP 44 - Grand Magus - Monument Cd/LP (blue vinyl, gatefold sleeve)
- RISECD/LP 45 - Unearthly Trance - Season of Séance, Science of Silence CD/2LP (500 copies, black vinyl, deluxe gatefold)
- RISECD/LP 46 - Orange Goblin - Thieving from the House of God Cd/LP (1000 copies, orange vinyl, deluxe gatefold)
- RISECD/LP 47 - Witchcraft - Witchcraft CD/LP w/bonus track/PicDisc
- RISECD/LP 48 - Electric Wizard - We Live Cd/2LP (1000 copies, purple vinyl)
- RISECD 49 - Pod People - Doom Saloon CD
- RISECD 50 - ???
- RISE7 51 - Orange Goblin - Some You Win, Some You Lose 7-inch
- RISECD/LP 52 - Electric Wizard - Dopethrone re-issue CD/2LP (1000 white vinyl, 500 black vinyl. 2nd press: 50 Purple Silk, 100 Transparent Amber, 100 clear, 550 black)
- RISECD 53 - Orange Goblin - The Big Black re-issue CD
- RISEMCD/MLP 54 - Capricorns - Capricorns CD/LP
- RISECD/LP 55 - Unearthly Trance - In the Red CD/LP (blood red vinyl)
- RISEMLP 56 - Thy Grief Eternal - On Blackened Wings 12-inch (500 black vinyl, 500 silver/grey vinyl)
- RISEMLP 57 - Eternal - Lucifer's Children 12-inch (500 clear vinyl, 500 black vinyl)
- RISECD 58 - sHEAVY - Republic? CD
- RISECD 59 - Debris Inc. - Debris Inc. CD
- RISECD/LP 60 - Grand Magus - Wolf's Return CD/LP (500 black vinyl, 500 silver/grey vinyl)
- RISECD 61 - ???
- RISECD/LP 62 - Witchcraft - Firewood CD/LP (deluxe gatefold, 500 gold vinyl, 500 black vinyl)
- RISECD/LP 63 - Circulus - The Lick on the Tip of an Envelope Yet to Be Sent CD/LP (1000 black vinyl, 500 swirly vinyl, 100 clear vinyl)
- RISE7 64 - Circulus/Witchcraft split 7-inch (500 copies)
- RISE7/MCD 65 - Circulus - Swallow Cd single/7" (bright green and yellow)
- RISECD/LP 66 - Taint - The Ruin of Nova Roma CD/2LP
- RISECD 67 - Capricorns - Ruder Forms Survive CD
- RISE7 68 - Leaf Hound - "Freelance Fiend" 7-inch
- RISECD 69 - Grand Magus - Grand Magus (2006 re-issue w/ bonus tracks) CD
- RISECD 70 - Electric Wizard - Pre-Electric Wizard 1989-1994 CD
- RISECD/LP 71 - Electric Wizard - Electric Wizard (re-master) digiCD/LP w/bonus 7-inch (500 black vinyl, 500 ice blue vinyl, 500 luminous lime green vinyl)
- RISECD/LP 72 - Electric Wizard - Come My Fanatics... (re-master) digiCD/2LP w/bonus 7-inch (400 violet sparkle vinyl, 100 violet sparkle w/colored 7-inch, 500 deep red vinyl, 500 black vinyl)
- RISECD 73 - Electric Wizard - Dopethrone (re-master) digiCD
- RISECD 74 - Electric Wizard - Let Us Prey (re-master) digiCD/2×LP (100 clear vinyl, 500 deep red vinyl, 500 black vinyl)
- RISECD 75 - Electric Wizard - We Live (re-master) digiCD
- RISECD 76 - Orange Goblin - Frequencies From Planet Ten. Reissued in 2011 with three bonus tracks.
- RISECD 77 - Orange Goblin - Time Travelling Blues. Reissued in early 2011 with three bonus tracks.
- RISECD 78 - Orange Goblin - The Big Black
- RISECD 79 - Orange Goblin - Coup De Grace. Reissued in 2011 with three bonus tracks.
- RISECD 80 - Orange Goblin - Thieving From The House Of God
- RISECD/LP 81 - Firebird - Hot Wings
- RISECD/LP 82 - Mourn - Mourn CD/LP (100 clear vinyl, 200 leaf green vinyl, 400 black vinyl)
- RISECD 83 - Litmus - Planetfall CD
- RISE7 84 - Burning Saviours - "The Giant" 7-inch (100 clear vinyl 400 black vinyl)
- RISECD 85 - ???
- RISE7 86 - Gentlemans Pistols - "The Lady" 7-inch (100 clear vinyl, 400 black vinyl)
- RISE7 87 - Witchcraft - "If Crimson Was Your Colour" 7-inch (225 black vinyl, 225 clear vinyl)
- RISEMCD/MLP 88 - Winters - High As Satellites CD/LP (black vinyl, blue vinyl)
- RISECD 89 - Teeth of Lions Rule the Divine - Rampton deluxe edition
- RISECD 90 - ???
- RISECD 91 - ???
- RISEMCD/MLP 92 - Chrome Hoof - Beyond Zade
- RISECD/LP 93 - Circulus - Clocks Are Like People digiCD/LP (500 white vinyl w/ bonus 7-inch, 700 blue vinyl, 500 black vinyl)
- RISE7/CD 94 - Circulus - Song of Our Despair CD single/7" (black vinyl, clear vinyl, violet vinyl)
- RISE7 95 - Moss/Monarch - split 7-inch (50 sea blue vinyl, 100 clear vinyl 400 black vinyl)
- RISECD 96 - Winters - Black Clouds in Twin Galaxies CD
- RISECD 97 - ???
- RISECD/LP 98 - Gentlemans Pistols - Gentlemans Pistols CD/LP (100 clear vinyl, 200 yellow vinyl, 200 black vinyl)
- RISELP 99 - Miasma & The Carousel of Headless Horses - Perils
- RISECD/LP 100 - Electric Wizard - Witchcult Today CD/LP (100 purple vinyl, 200 black sparkle vinyl, 200 green vinyl)
- RISE7 101 - Diagonal - Heavy Language 7-inch (500 black sparkle vinyl)
- RISECD 102 - Never released (According to Jeremy at Rise Above)
- RISECD/LP 103 - Witchcraft - The Alchemist CD/LP (25 ultra blue vinyl, 50 clear vinyl, 500 magnolia vinyl, 400 black sparkle vinyl, 500 black vinyl)
- RISECD/LP 104 - Taint - Secrets and Lies CD
- RISE10 107 - Atavist - Alchemic Resurrection 10-inch
- RISELP 108 - Moss - Sub Templum 2LP
- RISECD/LP 109 - Blood Ceremony - Blood Ceremony CD/LP (300 red/black vinyl w/bonus 7-inch, 300 purple vinyl, 300 black vinyl)
- RISECD/LP 112 - Serpentcult - Weight of Light CD/LP (300 silver/grey vinyl w/bonus 7-inch, 300 white/black splatter vinyl, 300 black vinyl)
- RISECD/LP 113 - Grand Magus - Iron Will CD/LP (200 clear vinyl, 200 white vinyl, 300 black vinyl)
- RISE7 114 - Crowning Glory/Gates of Slumber split 7-inch (black vinyl, green vinyl, blue vinyl)
- RISECD 115 - Capricorns - River Bear Your Bones CD
- RISE12/116 - Electric Wizard/Reverend Bizarre - split 12-inch EP (350 blood red vinyl w/poster, 500 purple vinyl, 500 clear vinyl, 500 silver vinyl, 500 black vinyl)
- RISECD 124 - Ghost - Opus Eponymous
- RISECD 130 - Electric Wizard- Black Masses CD

In early 2011 the label also reissued five Orange Goblin albums with bonus tracks largely covers or demo versions of preceding tracks, released with the same catalogue numbers as when they were first released.

=== Rise Above Relics releases ===
- RAR7 001 - Luv Machine - "Witches Wand" 7-inch
- RARCD/LP 001 - Luv Machine - Turns You On! CD/LP (500 black vinyl, 400 cerise vinyl, 100 clear vinyl)
- RARCD/LP 002 - Possessed - Exploration CD/LP
- RARCD/LP 004 - AX - "You've Been So Bad"
- RARCD/LP 005 - Necromandus - "Orexis of Death & Live"
- RARLP 006 - Comus - "First Utterance"
- RARLP 007 - Mellow Candle - "Swaddling Songs PLUS" Deluxe Boxset
- RARCD/LP 008 - Steel Mill - "Jewels of the Forest"
- RARCD/LP 009 - Incredible Hog - "Volume 1 + 4"
- RARCDBOX010 - Bang - "Bullets 4 x CD Box Set"
- RARCD/LP 011 - The (Original) Iron Maiden - "Maiden Voyage" CD/LP (Bonus vinyl single with LP by BUM) + extensive booklet
- RARCD/LP 013 - Rog & Pip - "Our Revolution"

== See also ==
- List of record labels
- List of independent UK record labels
