= Ufomammut =

Italian doom metal band

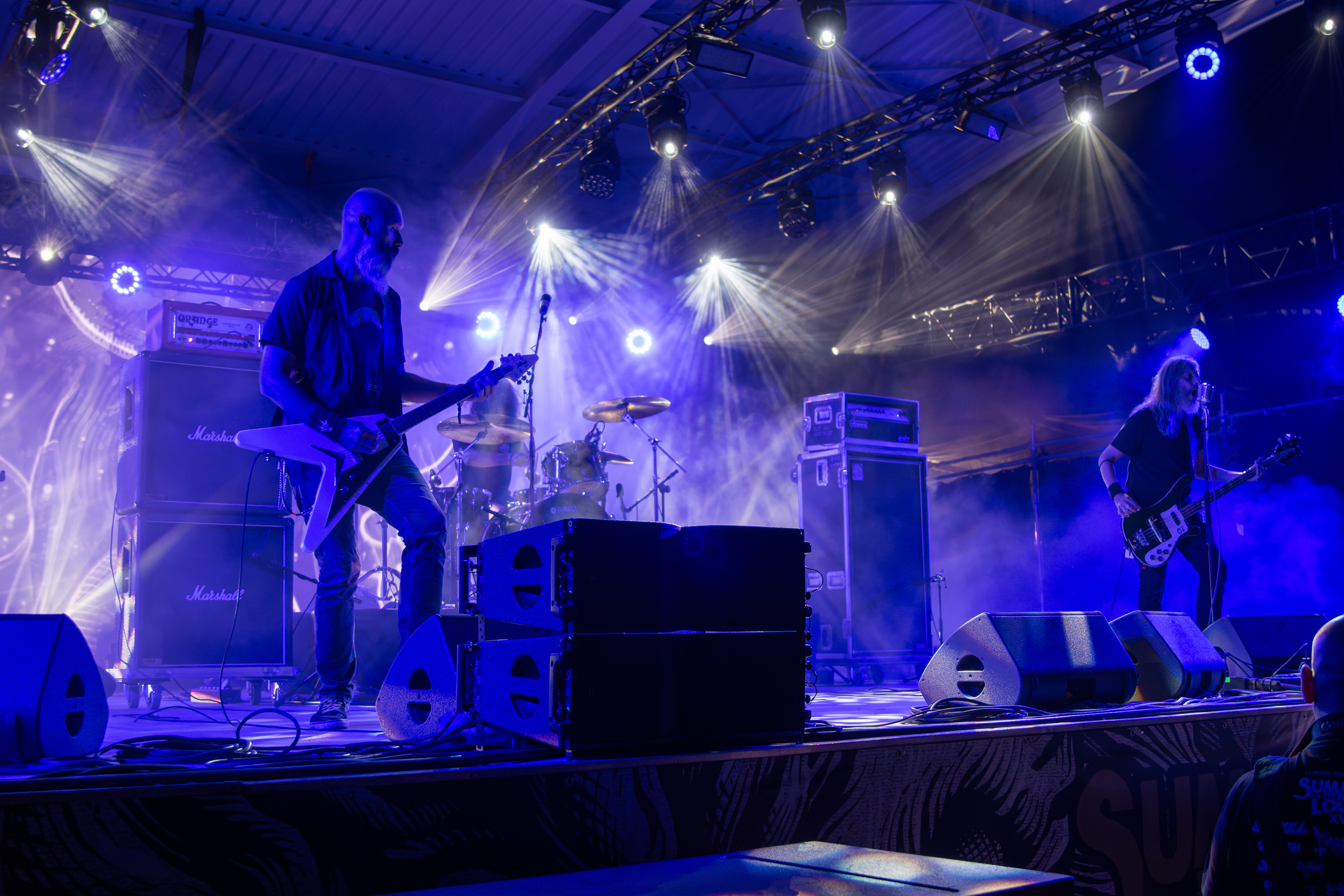
- Ufomammut in 2024

Background information
- Origin: Tortona, Italy
- Genres: Doom metal; stoner rock; sludge metal; drone metal
- Years active: 1999–2020, 2021–present
- Labels: Neurot; Supernatural Cat; Rocket; The Music Cartel; Beard of Stars
- Members: Poia; Urlo; Levre
- Past members: Vita
- Website: www.ufomammut.com

Ufomammut (Italian pronunciation: [ufomamˈmut]) is an Italian doom metal band formed in 1999 by guitarist Poia, bassist and vocalist Urlo, and drummer Vita.

They have released eight studio albums to date, the last three through Neurot Recordings.

== History ==
Ufomammut was formed in Italy in 1999 by Poia, Urlo and Vita, a lineup that had remained stable until 2020, when Vita left the band to dedicate himself to other musical projects. The trio has developed a sound characterised by lengthy songs centered on repeated heavy riffs coupled with droning vocals and the use of sound effects and synths.

Ufomammut released their debut studio album Godlike Snake in 2000 through Beard of Stars Records. It was followed in 2004 by Snailking, which was later reissued by Supernatural Cat Records in 2009.

The third album Lucifer Songs was released in 2005 and brought the band to discover new sonic paths with a massive use of droning sounds and synths, while in 2007 the band recorded a collaboration album with fellow Italian band Lento titled Supernaturals: Record One.

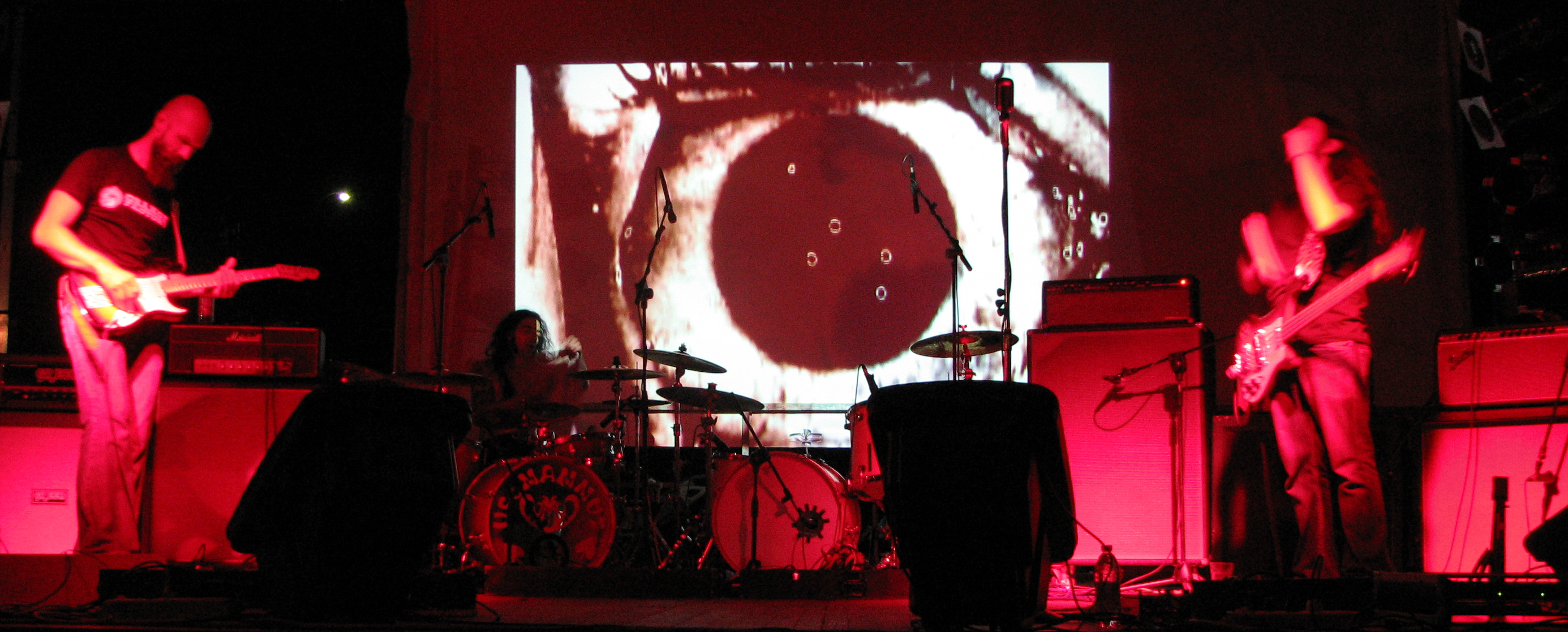
Poia (left), Vita (centre) and Urlo (right) performing at Shagoo Shagoo Fest 2008.

In 2008, they released their fourth studio album, Idolum, pushing even further the monolithic sound and psychedelic vein of their music to a new level of composition.

In 2010 the band released Eve, their fifth album. Eve consists of one 45-minute atmospheric track, divided into five distinctive movements; it depicts Eve as a figure reminiscent of both Lucifer (in her rebellion against God) and Prometheus (in bringing knowledge to humanity).

ORO, divided into ten movements, was delivered by Neurot Recordings in two separate pieces during 2012: the first chapter, Opus Primum, in April, and the second, Opus Alter, in September. The concepts behind ORO are expansive and multi-faceted, mutating the Italian palindrome which translates to "gold" with the Latin translation of "I pray." ORO's two chapters can be considered as a single track, as the last part of Opus Primum is able to flow easily into Opus Alter.

Ecate came out in 2015 and it is the seventh album of the band, released again by Neurot Recordings. Its title is Italian for the pre-Hellenic goddess Hecate.

The seventh album of the band is an evolution in terms of composition and song structure, it is an aggressive and complex album that bring the previous works to a new form.

The band's latest studio album 8 came out on 22 September 2017 through Neurot Recordings and Supernatural Cat for the vinyl release in Europe. It is a continuous flux of music (its title symbolizing infinity), a single stream divided in 8 songs, recorded live together with no overdubs with the exception of vocals and synths.

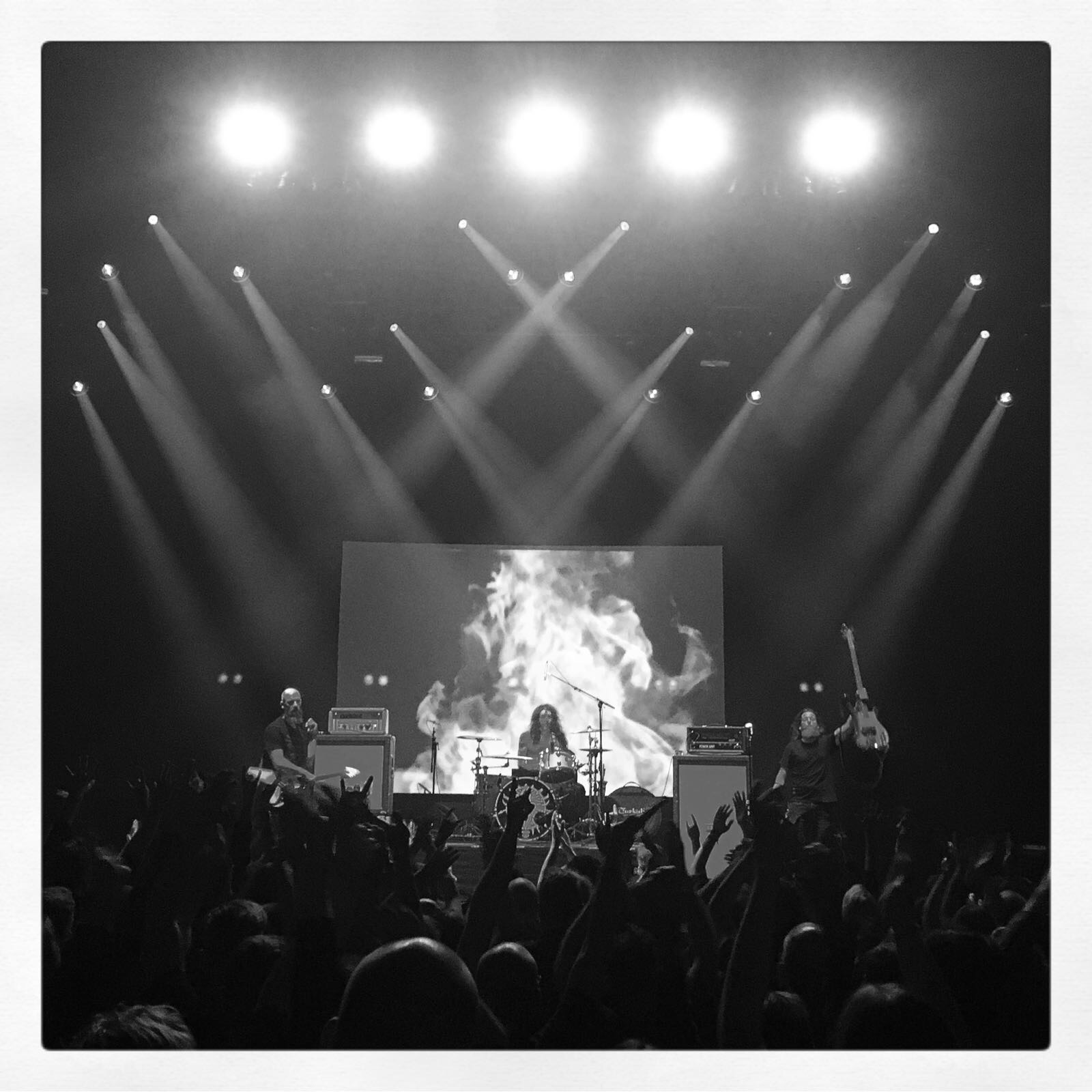
Ufomammut live at Soulcrusher II Festival, Nijmegen (Netherlands) (2017)

Ufomammut have made continual appearances at festivals like Roadburn, Hellfest, Asymmetry, Dour Festival, Ieper Fest, Stoned from the Underground, South of Mainstream, Festival d'Affaire, Metalride fest, Le Guess who festival, Maryland Death Fest, Brutal Assault Festival, FIMAV and more and have been touring several times around Europe, reaching the US and Canada in 2015, New Zealand and Australia in 2016 and Russia in 2017.

Ufomammut's live shows are supported by the video and graphic art studio Malleus Rock art lab, a rock artist collective of which Poia and Urlo form a part.

The band announced Vita's departure and their temporary hiatus in January 2020.

In April 2021 Ufomammut returned, with Levre as the new drummer.

== Style ==
The sound of Urlo's bass and Poia's guitar are typically distorted, Vita's drum rhythms are slow and the band uses psychedelic and hypnotic visuals during the live shows. During the live performances the band syncs loops of videos with the different parts in their composition, adding up to the sound layers. The songs' structure is in many cases similar to the one typical of progressive rock. The sound of Ufomammut is the product of research around the instruments and amplification setup, resulting in the use of custom tube amplifiers with heavy full size cabinets, and B tuning on guitar and bass.

== Members ==
=== Current ===
- Poia – guitar, synthesizers, sound effects (1999–present)
- Urlo – bass guitar, synthesizers, sound effects, vocals (1999–present)
- Levre – drums, sound effects (2021–present)

=== Past ===
- Vita – drums (1999–2020)
- Tavor – bass, drums
- Alien – Korg MS-20, guitar
- The Flyeater – Korg MS-20
- LeGof – keyboards

== Discography ==
=== Studio albums ===
- Godlike Snake (2000)
- Snailking (2004)
- Lucifer Songs (2005)
- Supernaturals: Record One with Lento (2007)
- Idolum (2008)
- Eve (2010)
- Oro: Opus Primum (2012)
- Oro: Opus Alter (2012)
- Ecate (2015)
- 8 (2017)
- Fenice (2022)
- Hidden (2024)

=== Compilations ===
- Stone Deaf Forever! (2000)
- Blue Explosion (tribute to Blue Cheer) (2000)
- The Mob's New Plan (2001)

=== Others ===
- Satan (demo, 1999)
- XV: Fifteen Years of Ufomammut (DVD, 2014)
- "Warsheep" (single, 2017)
- XX (Live album, 2019)
- Crookhead (EP, 2023)

Music Videos ● "Somnium" (2015) ● "Warsheep" (2017) ● "Psychostasia" (2022) ● "Pyramind" (2022) ● "Vibrhate" (2023) ● "Leeched" (2024)

== Links ==
- Official website
- Facebook
- Instagram
- Youtube
- Bandcamp
