= The Electric Sleep =

Studio album by Sheavy
- Released: 1998
- Genre: Stoner rock
- Label: Rise Above Records; The Music Cartel

Sheavy chronology
Blue Sky Mind (1996)	The Electric Sleep (1998)	Celestial Hi-Fi (2000)

The Electric Sleep is the second studio album by Canadian metal band Sheavy, released in 1998.

A demo of the album's title-track could be found on the web and was described as a lost Black Sabbath track.

Professional ratings
Review scores
Source	Rating
Allmusic	2.5/5 stars

== Track listing ==
1. "Virtual Machine" - 5:51
2. "Velvet" - 4:05
3. "Destiny's Rainbow" - 3:23
4. "Electric Sleep" - 5:34
5. "Born in a Daze" - 4:08
6. "Automaton" - 4:10
7. "Savannah" - 6:37
8. "Saving Me" - 3:46
9. "Oracle" - 6:50
10. "Stardust" - 9:41
11. "Last Parade" - 5:15
