= Republic? =

Studio album by Sheavy
- Released: 2005
- Genre: doom metal stoner metal heavy metal
- Length: 51:02
- Label: Rise Above Records
- Producer: Billy Anderson

Sheavy chronology
Synchronized (2002)	Republic? (2005)	The Machine That Won the War (2007)

Republic? is the fifth studio album from Canadian doom metal band Sheavy. It was produced by Billy Anderson and was released in 2005.

== Reception ==
Professional ratings
Review scores
Source	Rating
Allmusic	3.5/5 stars
Blabbermouth	7/10
Terrorizer	7.5/10

Jim Martin observed in Terrorizer that "Republic? finds sHeavy rejuvenated, fighting fit and sounding vital and righteous beyond belief. Central to this unexpected rejuvenation is that this is no mere Sabbath tribute record. Although still firmly rooted in elephantine riffs, chugging doom-grooves and 70s shapes, Republic? marks a considerable broadening of this band's horizons, revelling in punkier drives and psychedelic expanses." While Alex Henderson also noted sHeavy's affinity for Sabbath, he said that Republic? differentiated itself from mere tribute due to "a sludginess that you won't find on Sabbath's classic '70s recordings - a sludginess that owes something to the Melvins as well as grunge". Blabbermouth's Scott Alisoglu praised the album for its "biting guitar tone, monster riffage, and a batch of cool solos make it worth cranking at top volume in the car stereo with a cooler of brew in the backseat", and suggested that "Unless you're looking for a reinvention of the wheel, there isn't much to bitch about on Republic?".

== Track listing ==
1. "Spy vs. Spy" (3:03)
2. "The Rook" (5:36)
3. "Hangman" (4:40)
4. "Standing at the Edge of the World" (7:20)
5. "Revenge of the Viper Three" (4:17)
6. "A Phone Booth in the Middle of Nowhere" (3:17)
7. "The Man Who Never Was" (5:30)
8. "Stingray, Pt. III" (4:46)
9. "Moments of Silence" (3:00)
10. "Imitation of Christ" (4:06)
11. "Last Chance (Gremlin X)" (5:23)
