= Thieving from the House of God =

Studio album by Orange Goblin
- Released: 6 April 2004
- Recorded: August 2003
- Genre: Stoner metal, heavy metal
- Length: 47:11
- Label: Rise Above Records; The Music Cartel
- Producer: Billy Anderson

Orange Goblin chronology
Coup de Grace (2002)	Thieving from the House of God (2004)	Healing Through Fire (2007)

Professional ratings
Review scores
Source	Rating
AllMusic	3/5 stars

Thieving from the House of God is the fifth studio album by English stoner metal band Orange Goblin, released in 2004. The album features a cover of ZZ Top's "Just Got Paid".

== Track listing ==
No.	Title	Length
1.	"Some You Win, Some You Lose"	3:19
2.	"One Room, One Axe, One Outcome"	5:29
3.	"Hard Luck"	2:30
4.	"Black Egg"	5:04
5.	"You're Not The One (Who Can Save Rock n' Roll)"	2:20
6.	"If It Ain't Broke, Break It"	5:25
7.	"Lazy Mary"	3:17
8.	"Round Up the Horses"	5:32
9.	"Tosh Lines"	1:21
10.	"Just Got Paid" (ZZ Top cover)	3:31
11.	"Crown of Locusts"	9:23

== Personnel ==
- Ben Ward – vocals, guitar
- Joe Hoare – guitar
- Martyn Millard – bass
- Chris Turner – drums
- Sarah Shanahan – backing vocals ("Black Egg")
- Tony Sylvester – backing vocals ("If It Ain't Broke, Break It")
- Billy Anderson – backing vocals ("If It Ain't Broke, Break It", "Crown of Locusts"), noises ("Crown of Locusts")
- Produced, engineered, mixed and mastered by Billy Anderson
