= Sheavy =

Canadian metal band

sHEAVY
- Also known as: Green Machine
- Origin: St. John's, Newfoundland and Labrador, Canada
- Genres: Stoner metal, stoner rock, doom metal
- Years active: 1993–present
- Labels: Rise Above
- Members: Steve Hennessey – vox Jason Williams – drums Glen Tizzard – bass
- Website: sheavy.com

Sheavy (stylized sHEAVY) is a Canadian stoner metal band formed in 1993 in St. John's.

== History ==
=== Formation and name change ===
Sheavy formed in St. John's, Newfoundland and Labrador, in 1993 and originally performed under the name Green Machine. In 1994, the band discovered there was another band in the United States with the same name, so a decision was made to rename the band Sheavy. The band's repertoire originally consisted of a sampling of Kyuss covers and an assortment of originals that would eventually make their way onto the Reproduction E.P., Slaves To Fashion, and ultimately Blue Sky Mind. A three-song 7-inch vinyl record was recorded in early 1995 at Jolly Roger Studios in St. John's. The band regularly performed in and around St. John's for the first few years at small clubs and venues such as The Loft, Sam Shades; Junctions and the LSPU Hall.

=== Record deal ===
The band recorded and mixed their debut album Blue Sky Mind over a single weekend during the summer of 1995. Later that summer, the band's bass player Paul Gruchy amicably left the band to focus on completing his university studies. There were about 1000 copies of the album released early in 1996, at which time Keith Foley also stepped in to complete the Sheavy line-up as the band's bassist. Although the audio quality of Blue Sky Mind was low, the original master tapes later revealed a much-higher audio quality existed. On the strength and popularity of the recording, however, Rise Above Records in the U.K. signed the band to a three-album deal. The band now had more resources available and were better prepared for work on the second studio album.

=== The Electric Sleep ===
The Electric Sleep was recorded in St. John's in the summer of 1997. Recording Engineer Don Ellis helped the band capture the simple, powerful sound they had been searching for. The result was an album one British reviewer deemed "the best Black Sabbath album in 25 years." Black Sabbath comparisons were nothing new for the band, but for every review filled with praise another came along that maintained they were little more than clones. The album's doomy title track could even be found on the web described as a lost Sabbath track. After a short tour of the U.K. and an invitation to play the Dynamo Open Air Festival in the Netherlands, the band headed back to the studio.

=== Celestial Hi-Fi ===
Recorded in the summer of 1999, in the workshop of Ren Squires' parents home, Celestial Hi-Fi, showcased the diversity of the Sheavy sound. The delicate nuances of "Persona" gave way to the doom of "Tales From The Afterburner," while tracks like "What's Up Mr. Zero" and "Strange Gods Strange Altars" illustrated the band's ability to throw hooks into the mix. Reviews of the album were generally positive.

=== Synchronized ===
In October 2001, the band converged on Keith's new home in Edmonton Alberta to write and rehearse for what would become the Synchronized sessions. Recorded in November 2001, with former Black Sabbath Producer/Engineer Mike Butcher at the helm, Synchronized once again saw the band diversify its sound with the addition of synthesizer, piano and drum loops. Despite, and perhaps because of the addition of Butcher, the album has been described as the band's least Sabbath-like release and nothing less than a sincere tribute to 1970s rock. Written largely in the studio due to time constraints, the album's rock-solid production showcased a raw power unseen on the Sheavy's previous releases.

In September 2004, the band reunited in St. John's to begin writing songs for a new album. Due to a number of outside obligations, consummate band leader and drummer Ren Squires stepped quietly out of the spotlight. Kevin Dominic, a long-time friend of the band, was brought in to keep the band running. By November the band emerged with 11 new tracks. Over the next month, with the help of friend and Producer Rick Hollett, the band tracked Republic? above a Duckworth Street club called The Republic. Billy Anderson mixed Republic? in San Francisco, California, and the album was released on Rise Above Records in 2005.

In 2006, the band travelled to Europe for a two-week tour, which included a number of countries and festivals.

=== The Machine That Won the War ===
On March 3, 2007, Sheavy filmed a live performance at the Holy Heart of Mary High School auditorium in their hometown of St. John's. This performance was released as a DVD that accompanied the CD. The band recorded the studio album via analog instead of digital, and vocalist Steve Hennessey acted as the producer. The CD booklet features panels of artwork by a number of Newfoundland musicians and friends connected to the band, including two panels by Sheavy's original bassist Paul Gruchy. Each panel is directly inspired by, and corresponds to each track on the album.

Following that release, both Tommy Boland and Kevin Dominic amicably parted ways with the band. Evan Chaulker, who had previously toured with Sheavy, was brought in on guitar, and Jason Williams joined the band on drums.

=== The Golden Age of Daredevils and Disfigurine ===
In April 2009, original guitarist Dan Moore resigned from the band and announced his decision to the band's Facebook fan group – both via email. The band enlisted guitarist Chris White on guitar and premiered the new guitarist and new material at local St. John's venue Distortion in October 2009. Recording began on a forthcoming album, Disfigurine, roughly around the same period. Prior to its completion, though, the band took up the RPM challenge, which invites musicians to record a whole album of music, 10 songs or 35 minutes. The end result was an album entitled The Golden Age of Daredevils which was released in late May 2010 and included songs written by the new lineup as well as material written by Dan Moore prior to his departure. The album Disfigurine was later released in August 2010. Featuring a more metal style and some of the longest songs the band had ever written, Disfigurine pointed to a number of stylistic changes for the band.

The band played a handful of shows in the St. John's area between late 2010 and 2012 but song writing continued at a steady pace. Citing personal and family commitments bassist Keith Foley and guitarist Chris White parted ways with the band in the spring of 2012. In order to keep the song writing process rolling Steve asked local St. John's guitar players Barry Peters and Glen Tizzard (bass) to get together to jam and write. While Tizzard was able to join the band on a full-time basis, Peters helped to write and record but was unable to fully come on board due to out of province work commitments.

== Line-up timeline ==
Sheavy lineups
1993 (as Green Machine)	Steve Hennessey – vocals; Dan Moore – guitar; Stirling Robertson – guitar; Paul Gruchy – bass guitar; Ren Squires – drums
1994–1995	Steve Hennessey – vocals; Dan Moore – guitar; Paul Gruchy – bass guitar; Ren Squires – drums
1996–2004	Steve Hennessey – vocals; Dan Moore – guitar; Keith Foley – bass guitar; Ren Squires – drums
2004–2005	Steve Hennessey – vocals; Dan Moore – guitar; Keith Foley – bass guitar; Kevin Dominic – drums
2005–2008	Steve Hennessey – vocals; Dan Moore – guitar; Tommy Boland – guitar; Keith Foley – bass guitar; Kevin Dominic – drums
2008–2009	Steve Hennessey – vocals; Dan Moore – guitar; Evan Chaulker – guitar; Keith Foley – bass guitar; Jason Williams – drums
2009–2012	Steve Hennessey – vocals; Chris White – guitar; Evan Chaulker – guitar; Keith Foley – bass guitar; Jason Williams – drums
2012–present	Steve Hennessey – vocals; Evan Chaulker – guitar; Jason Williams – drums; Glen Tizzard – bass

== Discography ==
=== Studio albums ===
- Blue Sky Mind CD (1996 Dallas Tarr Records), LP (2007 Dallas Tarr Records)
- The Electric Sleep CD (1998 Rise Above Records), LP (May 18, 2015 Rise Above Records)
- Celestial Hi-Fi CD (2000 Rise Above Records), LP (June 2, 2015 Rise Above Records)
- Synchronized CD (2002 Rise Above Records)
- Republic? CD (2005 Rise Above Records)
- The Machine That Won the War CD (2007 Candlelight Records)
- The Golden Age of Daredevils CD (2010 Dallas Tarr Records)
- Disfigurine CD (August 24, 2010, Dallas Tarr Records)
- Moons in Penumbra Cassette (December 6, 2013, Dallas Tarr Records), CD (December 16, 2013, Dallas Tarr Records), LP (March 2014 Hydro-Phonic Records)
- The Best of Sheavy: A Misleading Collection CD (May 8, 2014, Dallas Tarr Records)

=== Demos/EPs ===
- The Reproduction E.P. Cassette (1994)
- Slaves to Fashion Cassette (1995)
- Untitled 3-song 7-inch EP (1995 Mag Wheel Records)
- Born Too Late split CD with Church of Misery (1997 Game Two Records)

=== Compilations appearances ===
- "Electric Sleep (original version)" on Welcome to Meteor City CD (1998 MeteorCity Records)
- "Pictures of You" on Rise 13 – Magick Rock Vol. 1 CD (1999 Rise Above Records)
- "Face in the Mirror" on In the Groove CD (1999 The Music Cartel)
- "Sea of Tomorrow" on I am Vengeance: Official Soundtrack CD (2007 MeteorCity)

=== Video ===
- Republic? at the Masonic Temple DVD (2005)

Live at Holy Heart bonus DVD in the deluxe "Machine that won the war"
