= Grand Union (Firebird album) =

Studio album by Firebird
- Released: 2009
- Recorded: May 2008, Berno Studio, Malmö Sweden
- Genre: Blues rock, stoner rock
- Label: Rise Above
- Producer: Berno Paulsson, Firebird

Firebird chronology
Hot Wings (CD/LP) (2006)	Grand Union (2009)	Double Diamond (2010)

Grand Union is the fifth studio album from the band Firebird, which was formed by Carcass guitarist Bill Steer with drummer Ludwig Witt. It was released in 2009 on Rise Above Records. In addition to the nine original tracks, it features covers of James Taylor, Humble Pie and British bluesman Duster Bennett.

== Reception ==
Professional ratings
Review scores
Source	Rating
AllMusic	3.5/5 stars

Greg Prato of AllMusic gave the disc 3.5 of 5 stars saying "Everything about this release reeks of the '70s" and that listeners should "be prepared to be transported to the heady days of incense, bell-bottoms, afros, and blacklight posters."

== Track listing ==
1. Blue Flame 3:27 (Bill Steer, Smok Smoczkiewicz, Ludwig Witt)
2. Jack The Lad 2:04 (Steer, Smoczkiewicz, Witt)
3. Lonely Road 4:22 (Steer)
4. Fool For You 2:10 (James Taylor)
5. Silent Stranger 3:01 (Steer)
6. Release Me 3:55 (Steer)
7. Wild Honey 3:01 (Steer)
8. Gold Label 3:13 (Steer, Smoczkiewicz, Witt)
9. Worried Mind 2:14 (Duster Bennett)
10. See The Light 4:53 (Steer)
11. Four Day Creep 3:14 (Ida Cox)
12. Caledonia 5:40 (Steer)
- Note: The track "Four Day Creep" was originally performed by British boogie rock band Humble Pie.

== Personnel ==
- Bill Steer: Vocals, Lead & Rhythm Guitars, Harmonica
- Smok Smoczkiewicz: Bass
- Ludwig Witt: Drums, Percussion

== Production ==
- Arranged by Firebird
- Produced by Berno Paulsson and Firebird
- Recorded, engineered and mixed by Berno Paulsson
- Mastered by Tim Turan
