= Science, Not Fiction =

Studio album by Orange Goblin
- Released: 19 July 2024
- Genre: Heavy metal, stoner metal, blues rock
- Length: 46:52
- Label: Peaceville

Orange Goblin chronology
The Wolf Bites Back (2018)	Science, Not Fiction (2024)

Science, Not Fiction is the tenth and final studio album by English heavy metal band Orange Goblin. The album was released on 19 July 2024 by Peaceville Records. It is the band's first album to feature bassist Harry Armstrong, who joined after the retirement of founding bassist Martyn Millard in 2021. Reviewers noted lyrical content of a more serious nature than on the band's previous albums, with a focus on religion, science, and spirituality, plus a taste of sarcasm and a voice of reason among modern political discussions. The new lyrical outlook was inspired by singer Ben Ward's adoption of a healthier lifestyle.

== Critical reception ==
The album received generally positive reviews from the rock and heavy metal media. Classic Rock raved that Orange Goblin "attain nation treasure status" (in the United Kingdom) with the release, while the band "aren’t just keeping up their impeccable standards, they’re getting better with age. They’re the real deal, the embodiment of British heavy metal, and we should all cherish them as such."

Mystification magazine called the album "the band's most complete, full-featured and driven heavy rock album in a decade or two" and concluded that it represents Orange Goblin's sound "past and present without a too-severe bloat to the running order." Metal Hammer praised the album as one of the best heavy metal albums of 2024, and noted the band's "profound understanding of what makes heavy metal such a joyous phenomenon." Kerrang! also praised the album, calling the band's performance "leaner, meaner and even trippier than ever before." Last Rites gave the album a favorable review while noting that "Catchiness is the name of the game from the get-go with tunes that sound like they’re straight from the golden age of heavy metal and rock ‘n’ roll."

Angry Metal Guy offered a mixed review, praising the consistency of Orange Goblin's sound but concluding that "despite some grand moments, Science, Not Fiction falls shy of past glories." Distorted Sound offered a similar assessment, concluding that "While the band have made evolutionary strides with this album in terms of songwriting process and lyrical observation, ultimately the album it is still a meat and potatoes heavy metal album that doesn’t deviate too far from the Orange Goblin template."

== Track listing ==
No.	Title	Length
1.	"The Fire at the Center of the Earth Is Mine"	5:20
2.	"(Not) Rocket Science"	4:21
3.	"Ascend the Negative"	5:24
4.	"False Hope Diet"	6:58
5.	"Cemetery Rats"	5:57
6.	"The Fury of a Patient Man"	3:01
7.	"Gemini (Twins of Evil)"	5:05
8.	"The Justice Knife"	4:59
9.	"End of Transmission"	5:51
Total length:		46:52

== Personnel ==
- Ben Ward – vocals
- Joe Hoare – guitar
- Chris Turner – drums
- Harry Armstrong – bass
