= Godlike Snake =

Studio album by Ufomammut
- Released: 2000
- Venue: DIY home recording by Ufomammut
- Studio: Home studio set up in Sindalona (AL Italy)
- Genre: Sludge metal; space rock
- Length: 56:56
- Label: Beard of Stars

Ufomammut chronology
Godlike Snake (2000)	Snailking (2004)

Godlike Snake is the first album by the Italian experimental metal band Ufomammut, released in 2000 on the Beard of Stars label.

Professional ratings
Review scores
Source	Rating
AllMusic	2.5/5 stars

== Track listing ==
No.	Title	Length
1.	"U.F.O. Pt. 1"	4:42
2.	"Satan"	3:26
3.	"Oscillator"	2:57
4.	"Snake"	3:53
5.	"Zerosette"	3:14
6.	"Smoke"	9:14
7.	"Nowhere"	2:43
8.	"Superjunkhead"	5:52
9.	"Hozomeen (with hidden track “Mammut”)"	20:55
Total length:		56:56
