= The Wolf Bites Back =

Studio album by Orange Goblin
- Released: 15 June 2018
- Studio: Orgone Studios
- Genre: Heavy metal, stoner metal, blues rock
- Length: 40:30
- Label: Candlelight
- Producer: Jaime "Gomez" Arellano

Orange Goblin chronology
Back from the Abyss (2014)	The Wolf Bites Back (2018)	Science, Not Fiction (2024)

The Wolf Bites Back is the ninth studio album by English heavy metal band Orange Goblin. It was released on 15 June 2018 by Candlelight Records. The album was produced by Jaime "Gomez" Arellano, who is best known for producing recent albums by Ghost and Paradise Lost, and was recorded at Orgone Studios in Bedfordshire, England. Motörhead guitarist Phil Campbell makes a guest appearance.

The album was preceded by the single "Sons of Salem". Singer Ben Ward explained that the album was constructed with live concerts in mind: "There was definitely a concerted effort to make sure all the songs could work in a live environment which gives the album a more raw, stripped-back feel — something that I feel has been lacking from good rock and metal in recent years." The album includes experimentation with doom metal, groove metal, and blues rock. One reviewer said of the album: "The best thing about [the album] though, is that for all its differences, it still sounds like Orange Goblin, still sounds like the band they always were, and the progression is entirely natural."

== Track listing ==
No.	Title	Length
1.	"Sons of Salem"	2:56
2.	"The Wolf Bites Back"	4:29
3.	"Renegade"	3:29
4.	"Swords of Fire"	4:33
5.	"Ghosts of the Primitives"	5:23
6.	"In Bocca Al Lupo"	2:19
7.	"Suicide Division"	2:01
8.	"The Stranger"	5:38
9.	"Burn the Ships"	4:41
10.	"Zeitgeist"	5:01
Total length:		40:30

== Personnel ==
- Ben Ward – vocals
- Joe Hoare – guitar
- Chris Turner – drums
- Martyn Millard – bass

== Charts ==
Chart (2018)	Peak position
Belgian Albums (Ultratop Flanders)	157
Belgian Albums (Ultratop Wallonia)	198
