= Our Problem =

Studio album by Iron Monkey
- Released: 8 September 1998
- Studio: Backstage Studios
- Genre: Sludge metal
- Length: 64:38
- Label: Earache – MOSH 207 CD
- Producer: Andy Sneap

Iron Monkey chronology
Iron Monkey (1996)	Our Problem (1998)	We've Learned Nothing (1999)

Professional ratings
Review scores
Source	Rating
AllMusic	4/5 stars
Terrorizer	5/5 stars

Our Problem is the second album by English sludge metal band Iron Monkey, released in 1998. The album caused controversy, mainly due to its artwork, which was produced by underground cartoonist Mike Diana. Extreme music magazine, Terrorizer, included the album at number 7 in its list of the top 20 Sludge Metal albums, published in issues 187-188.

== Track listing ==
No.	Title	Length
1.	"Bad Year"	6:06
2.	"Supagorgonizer"	3:59
3.	"Boss Keloid"	5:23
4.	"I.R.M.S."	6:29
5.	"House Anxiety"	3:49
6.	"2 Golden Rules"	4:34
7.	"9 Joint Spiritual Whip"	19:58
8.	"(silence)"	0:13
9.	"(silence)"	0:13
10.	"(silence)"	0:13
11.	"(silence)"	0:13
12.	"(silence)"	0:13
13.	"Omi Bozu (Wisdom Of Choking)"	13:15
Total length:		1:04:25
