= Serpentcult =

Belgian doom metal band

- Origin: Ghent, Belgium
- Genres: Doom metal
- Years active: 2006–2011 (on hold)
- Labels: I Hate, Rise Above, Listenable
- Members: Frédéric Caure; Frederik Cosemans; Steven Van Cauwenbergh
- Past members: Michelle Nocon

Serpentcult (alternately stylized as SerpentCult) were a Belgian doom metal band active between 2006 and 2011. They released one EP, Trident nor Fire (2007), and two full-length albums, Weight of Light (2008) and Raised by Wolves (2011).

== History ==
=== Formation and Trident nor Fire EP (2006–2007) ===
Serpentcult formed in 2006 shortly after the dissolution of Thee Plague of Gentlemen. That band split up in July of that year due to the lead vocalist being arrested for, and confessing to, child rape and similar sex crimes, having especially targeted girls who were Muslim and/or of eastern European descent. Thee Plague of Gentlemen's frontman was condemned and disowned by his band members, the Belgian media, and I Hate Records, who subsequently removed the band's debut album from their catalog.

The remaining three members of the previous band decided to move forward as Serpentcult as a trio, but afterward hired Michelle Nocon as lead vocalist. Their name is referential to what would have been Thee Plague of Gentlemen's second album.

Serpentcult's inaugural release was an EP titled Trident nor Fire, released on 23 April 2007, also through I Hate Records. The EP features three original tracks, followed by a cover of "Rainbow Demon" from Uriah Heep's album Demons and Wizards.

In April 2007, Serpentcult performed at the Doom Shall Rise festival in Göppingen, Germany.

=== Weight of Light (2008–2009) ===
On 17 April 2008, Serpentcult appeared on the first day of Roadburn Festival in Tilburg, Netherlands.

They released their debut full-length album, Weight of Light, in May 2008, via Rise Above Records. Guitarist Frédéric Caure described the title as referencing "some kind of society thing. It's about going away from the normal society and going your own way in the world without having all this materialistic stuff all around you... and having your inner enlightenment. This road to inner enlightenment is very individual and very much your own thing." Among the album's eight tracks are "Screams from the Deep" and "Red Dawn", which are re-recordings of songs that originally appeared on Trident nor Fire. The album was produced at Prior Studios by Greg Chandler of Esoteric and mixed by Billy Anderson.

Following the album's release, Serpentcult performed May 2008 dates in Germany and the Netherlands alongside UK doom metal band Warning. The band then held a CD release party on 10 May in Kuurne, Belgium. On 13 December 2008, Serpentcult played as part of the Rise Above Records' 20th Anniversary Show in London.

Serpentcult subsequently toured the United States with Zoroaster and The Gates of Slumber between 1 and 14 August 2009. The tour started in Chicago, went through eastern Canada and eastern/mid-western United States, and concluded in Indianapolis.

=== Departure of Michelle Nocon and Raised by Wolves (2010–2011) ===
In February 2010, Nocon and Serpentcult parted, upon which the remaining members decided not to replace her. Shortly after the announcement, they also decided to cancel their appearance at Tom G. Warrior's "Only Death is Real" concert event at Roadburn 2010, being replaced by Altar of Plagues. The last concert tour Serpentcult engaged in as a quartet went through Europe, alongside Dark Fortress, Farsot, and Sardonis. In a 2017 interview with nocleansinging.com, Nocon stated about her departure from Serpentcult, "I felt I had told my story. We somehow grew apart, musically and as individuals as well, and... it was only the right thing to leave."

Serpentcult's first album as a trio, and second overall, was Raised by Wolves, which was released in 2011 via Listenable Records. This album features longer songs on average than their previous full-length, and subdued yet existent vocals. In a non-rated positive review of the record, Natalie Zina Walschots of Exclaim! suggested, "Raised by Wolves is subtler than their previous work – still heavy, but now more meditative."

=== Aftermath (2012–present) ===
While Serpentcult has never been formally announced as disbanded, they have been dormant since 2011.

Both Michelle Nocon and "Cozy" Coseman went on to be vocalist and drummer, respectively, for Death Penalty, alongside Garry Jennings of Cathedral. Nocon was also the lead vocalist of Bathsheba between 2013 and 2018, and formed a solo project called Leviathan Speaks.

== Line-up ==
=== Final members ===
- Frédéric Caure – guitars (2006–2011), vocals (2010–2011)
- Steven Van Cauwenbergh – bass (2006–2011)
- Frederik "Cozy" Cosemans – drums (2006–2011)

=== Former members ===
- Michelle Nocon (a.k.a. Michelle Nocone) – vocals (2006–2010)

== Discography ==
- Trident nor Fire (EP, 2007)
- Weight of Light (full-length, 2008)
- Raised by Wolves (full-length, 2011)
