= Will Hodgkinson =

English journalist and author

Will Hodgkinson is a journalist and author from London (born in Newcastle-upon-Tyne), England. He is the chief rock and pop critic for The Times newspaper and contributes to Mojo magazine. He has written for The Guardian, The Independent and Vogue. Hodgkinson presents the Sky Arts TV show Songbook, in which he interviews contemporary songwriters.

His 2014 memoir The House Is Full Of Yogis tells the story of Hodgkinson's father joining an Indian spiritual group called the Brahma Kumaris and embracing celibacy, meditation and a radical, non-evolutionary world view, while his mother became a radical feminist and published Sex Is Not Compulsory, her case for the sexless marriage, just as Hodgkinson was trying to meet girls for the first time. His book, The Ballad Of Britain (2009) (Portico), is a travelogue for which he travelled through Britain making field recordings in an attempt to capture the spirit of the place and its people. Guitar Man (2006) and Song Man (2007) (Bloomsbury) are narrative non-fiction in a comic style. In Guitar Man, Hodgkinson picked up the guitar for the first time aged 34 with the aim of playing a concert six months later. He received lessons and advice from the Scottish folk guitarist Bert Jansch; Johnny Marr, former guitarist of The Smiths; Roger McGuinn of The Byrds; PJ Harvey and the pioneering guitarist Davey Graham. For Song Man he learned the basics of songwriting with the goal of recording a single at Toe-Rag Studios in London, this time picking up tips from Keith Richards, Andy Partridge of XTC, folk queen Shirley Collins and the hippy era songwriter Bridget St John. Guitar Man and Song Man are published in the US by Da Capo.

In 2007, Hodgkinson launched a project in conjunction with the The Guardian newspaper to create and run a record label, Big Bertha, which he wrote about in a monthly column. Acts signed to the label were the Cornish folk band Thistletown and Pete Molinari. In September 2024 his book on the singer Lawrence came out.

Hodgkinson is the brother of Tom Hodgkinson, the editor of The Idler. Their father is the science writer Neville Hodgkinson and their mother is the non-fiction writer and journalist Liz Hodgkinson.

Hodgkinson is married and has two children.

According to an article in The Times (12 November 2015) took his first and so far only trip with LSD when he was 17 years old. On a sunny day in 1988 he and a friend went to a hilltop in Richmond Park to try the drug. His initial effect of the drugs were "magical".

== Bibliography ==
=== Books ===
- Hodgkinson, Will (2009). The ballad of Britain : how music captured the soul of a nation. London: Portico.
- — (2014). The house is full of Yogis. London: Blue Door.
- —. Guitar Man. London: Bloomsbury. Da Capo, US
- —. Song Man. London: Bloomsbury. Da Capo, US
- — (2024). Street-Level Superstar. A Year With Lawrence. London: Nine Eight Books.

=== Essays and reporting ===
- Hodgkinson, Will (December 2014). "Old School Neil Diamond". What Goes On!. Mojo. 253: 12–13.
- — (December 2014). "Stetson the city : Americana 2014, the Ryman Auditorium, Nashville, Tennessee". Filter. Lives. Mojo. 253: 126–127.

== Sources ==
- Guitar Man (Bloomsbury, 2006)
- Song Man (Bloomsbury, 2007)
