= Snailking =

Studio album by Ufomammut
- Released: 2004
- Recorded: 2003–2004
- Venue: SOMS Sarezzano (AL)
- Studio: DIY recording
- Genre: Stoner metal; sludge metal; drone metal
- Length: 68:58
- Label: The Music Cartel

Ufomammut chronology
Godlike Snake (2000)	Snailking (2004)	Lucifer Songs (2005)

Snailking is the second album by Italian doom metal power trio Ufomammut, released in 2004.

== Track listing ==
No.	Title	Length
1.	"Blotch"	6:06
2.	"Hopscotch"	3:00
3.	"Lacrimosa"	6:50
4.	"Odio"	8:21
5.	"God"	6:15
6.	"Alcool"	4:08
7.	"Braindome"	6:08
8.	"Demontain"	28:06
Total length:		68:58
