= Flower of Disease =

Studio album by Goatsnake
- Released: October 31, 2000
- Genre: Stoner metal
- Length: 44:11
- Label: Man's Ruin; Southern Lord (SUNN13); Rise Above Records
- Producer: Nick Raskulinecz

Goatsnake chronology
Dog Days (2000)	Flower of Disease (2000)	Trampled Under Hoof (2004)

Professional ratings
Review scores
Source	Rating
AllMusic	3/5 stars
Chronicles of Chaos	8/10
The Encyclopedia of Popular Music	3/5 stars

Flower of Disease is an album by American doom metal band Goatsnake, released in 2000. The LP version was released by Southern Lord Records.

== Critical reception ==
AllMusic called the album "an enjoyable listen", writing that it "is a perfect marriage of modern production techniques, excellent riffing, melodic classic doom, and grooving ambience." LA Weekly wrote that "there's a certain slickness here, but an inimitable weirdness too, the combination of which makes this band so distinctly, quintessentially Los Angeles." The Encyclopedia of Popular Music wrote that the album "extended Goatsnake's move towards southern-fried doom leanings, further refining their bludgeoning style."

== Track listing ==
No.	Title	Length
1.	"Flower of Disease"	6:40
2.	"Praying for a Dying"	4:40
3.	"Easy Greasy"	5:14
4.	"El Coyote"	4:39
5.	"The Dealer"	5:26
6.	"A Truckload of Mamma's Muffins"	5:58
7.	"Live to Die"	3:19
8.	"The River"	8:15

== Personnel ==
Goatsnake

- Pete Stahl – vocals, harmonica
- Greg Anderson – guitar
- G. Stuart Dahlquist – bass
- Greg Rogers – drums

Additional personnel

- Dave Catching – lap steel on "El Coyote"
