= Hand of Doom =

1970 song by Black Sabbath

Song by Black Sabbath

from the album Paranoid
- Released: 18 September 1970
- Length: 7:08
- Label: Vertigo
- Songwriters: Tony Iommi, Geezer Butler, Bill Ward, Ozzy Osbourne
- Producer: Rodger Bain

"Hand of Doom" is a song by the English heavy metal band Black Sabbath, originally appearing on their second album Paranoid, released in 1970.

== Background ==
The song was conceived after the band had observed a growing number of US soldiers arriving in England from the Vietnam War in the late 1960s with severe drug addictions, particularly heroin which was in many cases used to cope with post traumatic stress disorder they were suffering. The song paints an unflattering picture of hard drug use for the purpose of self-medication. The lyrics were written by Geezer Butler while the music is credited to the entire band.

== Personnel ==
Black Sabbath

- Ozzy Osbourne – vocals
- Tony Iommi – guitars
- Geezer Butler – bass guitar
- Bill Ward – drums

== Cover versions ==
=== Danzig version ===
The band Danzig covered "Hand of Doom" for their album Danzig 5: Blackacidevil, with new lyrics and musical arrangements by Glenn Danzig. Danzig explained his changes to the original version: "I didn't want people to think it's just a cover...I started improvising and twisted the words. The melody is still the same, with an industrial kind of groove to the beginning and then the chorus comes in and it's full on crazy, with the screaming vocals." The idea for recording a cover version of the song came during a soundcheck by then-Danzig guitarist John Christ.

=== Orange Goblin version ===
The band Orange Goblin covered "Hand of Doom" for their EP Nuclear Guru.

=== Slayer version ===
The band Slayer covered "Hand of Doom" for the Black Sabbath tribute album Nativity in Black II.

=== Tool version ===
The progressive rock band Tool has covered the song live. They first covered it at the Back To The Beginning concert, and have performed it at several other concerts in 2025.

== In popular culture ==
- Melissa Auf der Maur, known for her work with Hole and The Smashing Pumpkins, was the leader of a Black Sabbath cover band named after this song.
- The song was used in a scene in the fourteenth episode of the first season of Elementary, originally aired on February 3, 2013.
- Metallica’s song about addiction, "Trapped Under Ice", from the 1984 album Ride the Lightning, references this track in the lyric "Hand of doom has a tight grip on me."
- A live cover of the song appears on Finnish band HIM's compilation album Uneasy Listening, Vol. 2.
- The cover art for the GZR album Black Science is intended to represent the Black Sabbath song "Hand of Doom".
