= A Eulogy for the Damned =

Studio album by Orange Goblin
- Released: 23 January 2012
- Genre: Stoner metal
- Length: 49:14
- Label: Candlelight Records

Orange Goblin chronology
Healing Through Fire (2007)	A Eulogy for the Damned (2012)	Back from the Abyss (2014)

A Eulogy for the Damned is the seventh studio album by English stoner metal band Orange Goblin. It was released by Candlelight Records in 2012.

== Reception ==
Professional ratings
Aggregate scores
Source	Rating
Metacritic	72/100
Review scores
Source	Rating
About.com	4/5 stars
AllMusic	3.5/5 stars
Exclaim!	favourable
Metal Hammer	9/10
PopMatters	7/10

Metal Hammer allowed a guest to write a review of the album, who stated: "Many bands that try their hand at stoner rock/metal fall into the trap of being... well, boring. Orange Goblin are not one of these bands!"

== Track listing ==
1. "Red Tide Rising" – 4:49
2. "Stand for Something" – 3:47
3. "Acid Trial" – 4:13
4. "The Filthy & the Few" – 3:32
5. "Save Me from Myself" – 5:58
6. "The Fog" – 6:45
7. "Return to Mars" – 2:26
8. "Death of Aquarius" – 5:48
9. "The Bishops Wolf" – 4:39
10. "A Eulogy for the Damned" – 7:17

== Personnel ==
- Ben Ward – lead vocals
- Joe Hoare – guitar, keyboards
- Martyn Millard – bass
- Christopher Turner – drums, percussion
- Lee Dorrian – guest vocals on "Return to Mars"

== Chart positions ==
Chart (2012)	Peak position
UK Albums Chart	149
