= Celestial Hi-Fi =

Studio album by Sheavy
- Released: 2000
- Genre: Stoner rock, stoner metal
- Length: 59:46
- Label: Rise Above Records; The Music Cartel
- Producer: Sheavy, Don Ellis, Rick Hollett

Sheavy chronology
The Electric Sleep (1998)	Celestial Hi-Fi (2000)	Synchronized (2002)

Professional ratings
Review scores
Source	Rating
AllMusic	3.5/5 stars
Chicago Tribune	3/4 stars
Kerrang!	3/5 stars
Rock Hard	8.5/10

Celestial Hi-Fi is a studio album from Canadian stoner rock band Sheavy, released in 2000.

== Critical reception ==
AllMusic wrote that "album highlights like 'Hyperfaster', 'What's up, Mr. Zero?', and 'Solarsphere' resemble sonic snapshots of prime-era Black Sabbath, simply updated with modern recording technology and augmented with a elements of space rock." Exclaim! thought that "guitarist Dan Moore really lets a Southern rock influence shine in his guitar playing, and drummer Ren Squires truly kicks the bejeezus out of his drums." The Chicago Tribune wrote that "their sound is so immediate, in-yer-face, and of-the-moment vital that it's hard to dub 'em retro in the manner of, say, Lenny Kravtiz."

== Track listing ==
1. "Hyperfaster" (4:26)
2. "What's Up Mr. Zero" (3:40)
3. "Stingray Part II" (5:20)
4. "Solarsphere" (5:45)
5. "Strange Gods, Strange Altars" (6:38)
6. "Celestial Hi-Fi" (6:48)
7. "At The Mountains Of Madness" (5:01)
8. "Persona" (6:42)
9. "A Utopian Interlude" (4:34)
10. "Gemini (The Twins)" (3:56)
11. "Tales From The Afterburner" (6:52)
