= Thistletown (band) =

British psychedelic folk band

Thistletown were a British psychedelic folk band from Falmouth, Cornwall, England.

== History ==
They came to public attention through a The Guardian column by Will Hodgkinson, concerning his year-long project to start a record label, after he saw them playing in The Jacobs Ladder pub in Falmouth. The band lived together on a boat, and formed due to a collective love of obscure 1970s folk bands such as Heron and Trees. They recorded an album, Rosemarie, named after their boat, in the garden of a Cornish cottage with Circulus main man, Michael Tyack, and Benet Walsh producing. The album was well received by the press, receiving four stars from The Times, along with Mojo magazine, Record Collector and others.

The band played at Green Man Festival in 2007, and Radio 1 DJ Rob Da Bank afterward declared them the "Kings and Queens of the Green Man", announcing, "They're so folky it hurts".

The group disbanded in 2008. They briefly reformed in 2010.

== Discography ==
- Rosemarie (2008, Big Bertha Records)

== Band members until 2008 ==
- Andrew Jarvis - Trumpet, Drums, Harmonium, Accordion.
- Lydia Thistle - Vocals, percussion.
- Tiffany Bryant - Vocals, percussion, Flute.
- Ben Tweddell - Guitar.
- Matthew Bennett - Drums and Percussion.
- Al Davies - Bass.
- Michael Tyack - Saz, Lute, Cittern, electric guitar.
- Benet Walsh - Bass, Mandolin, Clarinet.
- Mikey the dog - Vibes.
