= Taint (band) =

Welsh heavy metal band

- Origin: Swansea, Wales
- Genres: Sludge metal, hardcore punk, stoner rock
- Years active: 1994–2010
- Labels: Rise Above Records, Household Name Records, SuperFi Records, Destructure Records
- Members: James 'Jimbob' Isaac; Alex Harries; Chris West; Darren Mason; Stophe Thomas
- Website: Taint.co.uk

Taint was a Welsh three-piece heavy metal band from Swansea, Wales.

== History ==
The band was formed in 1994 by guitarist and singer James "Jimbob" Isaac, bassist Darren Mason, and drummer Alex Harries, when they were all still teen-agers. In 2000, they released their first EP, Die Die Truthspeaker. By this time, the bassist Stophe Thomas had replaced Mason; Thomas left in 2001 and was replaced by Chris West.

In 2005, they released their first album, The Ruin of Nová Roma. Their second release, Secrets and Lies, followed in 2007, with an EP, All Bees to the Sea, following in 2009.

In September 2010, Taint announced via their website that they were disbanding. The band had always toured extensively; now Harries and West wanted to stop touring and spend more time with their families and Isaac wanted to keep touring and writing. They played their final show in December 2010 in their hometown of Swansea. In 2019, Taint was included in the exhibit and documentary 50 Years of Music in Swansea.

Jimbob Isaac formed the three-piece band 'Hark'. followed by Silverburn and Chris West joined the band Spider Kitten.

== Discography ==
Format and year	Title	Label
CD (2021)	From The Mountains To The Sea Volume I Compilation (Various Artists)	Lavender Sweep Records
CD (2010) LP (2009)	All Bees To The Sea	Destructure
2xLP (2008)	Secrets And Lies	SuperFi
CD (2007)	Secrets And Lies	Rise Above Records
CD (2005)	The Ruin of Nová Roma	Rise Above Records
2xLP (2005)	The Ruin of Nová Roma	SuperFi
Split 7" (2005)	Champion Boar Service split with Army Of Flying Robots	SuperFi
Split CD (2003)	Split with Black Eye Riot	Black Phoenix Records
MCD (2000)	Die Die Truthspeaker	Household Name Records
CD (1999)	Rumour, Ridicule and the Profit Motive Compilation (Various Artists)	Household Name Records
CD (1998)	Fuck Off Household Name (Various Artists)	Household Name Records
Demo Cassette (1998)	Rought Demo '98	self-released
Demo Cassette (1997)	10 x Better	self-released
Demo Cassette (1996)	Rough Recordings 1996	self-released
Demo Cassette (1995)	Bellydown	self-released
