= Leadfoot (band) =

American stoner rock band

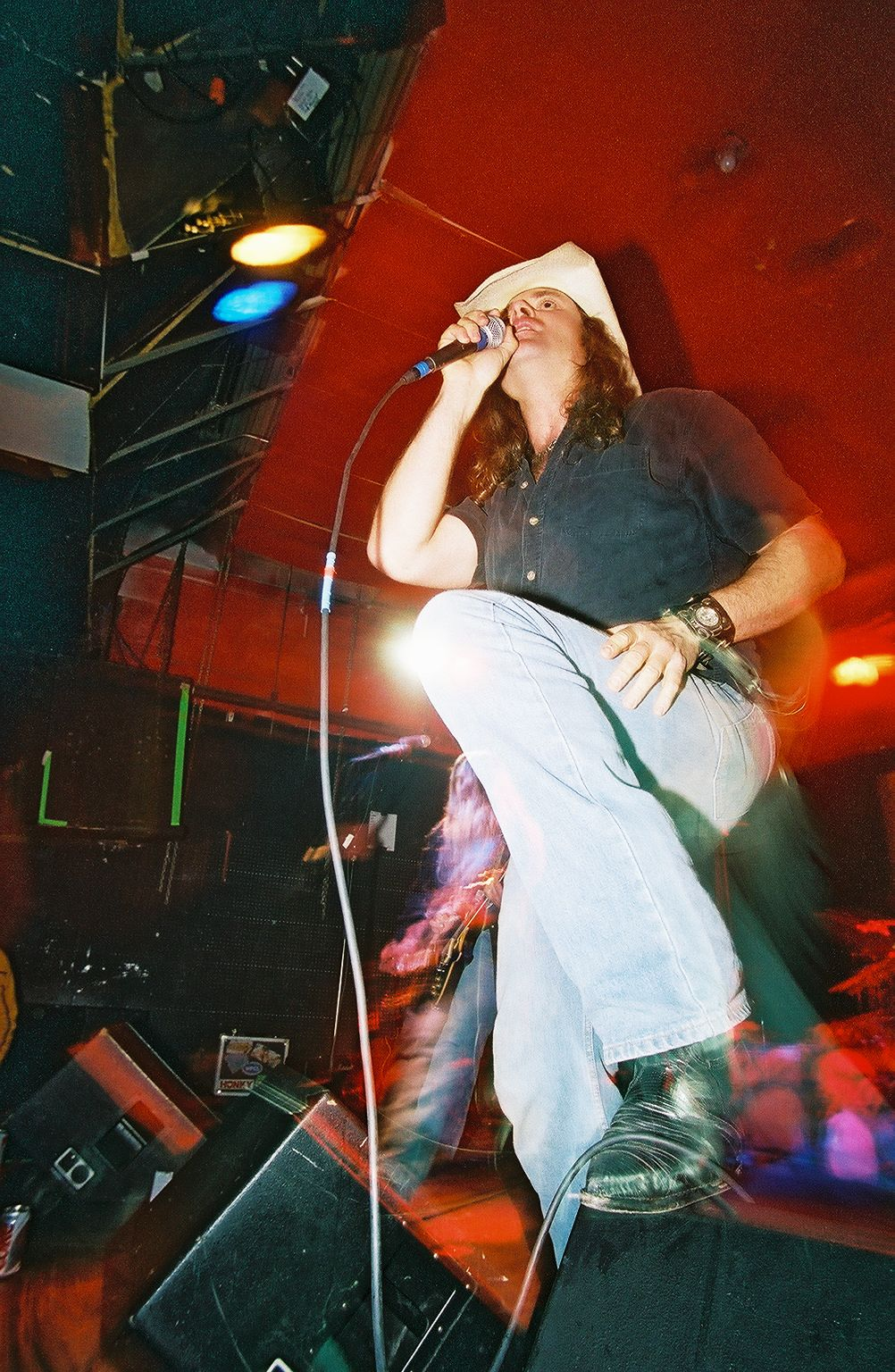
- Karl Agell performing with Leadfoot at The Cat's Cradle in 2003

Background information
- Origin: Raleigh, North Carolina, U.S.
- Genres: Stoner rock
- Years active: 1995–present
- Members: Karl Agell; Graham Fry; Scott Little; John Flowers; TR Gwynne
- Past members: Phil Swisher; Jon McClain; Ryan Barringer; Tim Haisman; John Dzubak; Paul Walz

Leadfoot is an American stoner rock band based in Raleigh, North Carolina, whose original members included vocalist Karl Agell and bassist Phil Swisher, both former members of Corrosion of Conformity. They were called Loose Cannon at first but learned that another band had had that name.

== Discography ==
Release date	Title	Label
1997	Bring It On	The Music Cartel
1999	Take a Look	The Music Cartel
2003	We Drink for Free	Abstract Music
