= The Big Black =

Studio album by Orange Goblin
- Released: 16 May 2000
- Recorded: November–December 1999
- Genre: Stoner metal, biker metal
- Length: 48:14
- Label: Rise Above Records; The Music Cartel
- Producer: Billy Anderson

Orange Goblin chronology
Orange Goblin/Alabama Thunderpussy (2000)	The Big Black (2000)	Coup de Grace (2002)

Professional ratings
Review scores
Source	Rating
AllMusic	4/5 stars
Kerrang!	4/5 stars
Metal Hammer	9/10

The Big Black is the third studio album by English stoner metal band Orange Goblin, released in 2000 on Rise Above Records. The LP version, along with the US domestic CD, was released by The Music Cartel. In 2004, Rise Above re-released the album and included a bonus track, a cover of Black Sabbath's "Into the Void". This track is also included on the original Japanese version.

== Track listing ==
No.	Title	Length
1.	"Scorpionica"	3:13
2.	"Quincy the Pigboy"	3:55
3.	"Hot Magic, Red Planet"	3:51
4.	"Cozmo Bozo"	5:59
5.	"298 kg"	3:54
6.	"Turbo Effalunt (Elephant)"	3:33
7.	"King of the Hornets"	5:13
8.	"You'll Never Get to the Moon in That"	4:21
9.	"Alcofuel"	2:23
10.	"The Big Black"	11:52

== Personnel ==
- Ben Ward – vocals
- Pete O'Malley – guitar
- Joe Hoare – guitar
- Martyn Millard – bass
- Chris Turner – drums
- Produced and engineered by Billy Anderson
