= Iron Monkey (band) =

English sludge metal band

Background information
- Origin: Nottingham, England
- Genres: Sludge metal
- Years active: 1994–1999, 2017–present
- Labels: Earache, Union Mill, Relapse
- Members: Steve Watson; Jim Rushby; Dean Berry; Ze Big
- Past members: Scott Briggs; Justin Greaves; Johnny Morrow; Doug Dalziel; Dean Berry; Stu O'Hara

Iron Monkey are an English sludge metal band that formed in Nottingham in 1994. The original members were Justin Greaves (drums, ex-Bradworthy), Johnny Morrow (vocals), Jim Rushby (guitar, ex-Ironside, Wartorn), Steve Watson (guitar, ex-Cerebral Fix) and Doug Dalziel (bass, ex-Ironside). The group's sound was influenced in particular by bands such as Grief, Black Sabbath and Eyehategod.

== History ==
In 1996, Iron Monkey wrote a six-song album that was released on the small imprint Union Mill. It was reissued in 1997 when the group signed to Nottingham label Earache Records. Before the deal was made however guitarist Watson was fired and replaced by Dean Berry. The band's second release Our Problem received high acclaim. In July 1999, the band released a split CD/10" with Japanese doom metal band Church of Misery that was put out by Man's Ruin Records. The same year the band played the Dynamo Festival in the Netherlands and shortly after Jim Rushby left the band and was replaced by ex-Acrimony guitarist Stu O'Hara. Due to a variety of personal and industry problems the band split in September 1999.

=== Post-split ===
Greaves, Rushby, and Morrow went on to form the short-lived Armour of God while Berry, Dalziel and O'Hara formed Dukes of Nothing. Watson has played in Cerebral Fix, Drown, Helvis and Raven's Creed. Morrow then formed My War and Murder One before suffering a fatal heart attack in the summer of 2002. Greaves has since played in Borknagar, Silver Ginger Five, Hard To Swallow, Teeth of Lions Rule the Divine, Electric Wizard and now plays in Crippled Black Phoenix. Berry played in The Dukes of Nothing and Capricorns, while O'Hara went on to play in Black Eye Riot. He is now playing with Acrimony members in Sigiriya, a stoner rock band. Rushby played in Hard to Swallow, Armour of God, Phantom Limb Management and Geriatric Unit.

=== Reunion ===
Iron Monkey reformed in January 2017 as a trio featuring Watson playing bass, Rushby singing and playing guitar, and new member Scott Briggs. The band wrote and recorded the album 9-13 which was released on Relapse records in October 2017. Scott Briggs was replaced on drums by Steven Mellor aka Ze Big from the band Widows in January 2018. On 5 April 2024 the band released their fourth studio album and first in seven years, 'Spleen & Goad'.

== Members ==
=== Current members ===
- Jim Rushby – guitar (1994–1999, 2017–present), vocals (2017–present)
- Steve Watson – guitar (1994–1997), bass (2017–present)
- Steven "Ze Big" Mellor – drums (2018–present)

=== Former members ===
- Justin Greaves – drums (1994–1999)
- Johnny Morrow – vocals (1994–1999; died 2002)
- Doug Dalziel – bass (1994–1999)
- Dean Berry – guitar (1997–1999)
- Stu O'Hara – guitar (1999)
- Scott "Brigga" Briggs – drums (2017)

== Discography ==
=== Albums ===
- Iron Monkey (Union Mill, 1996)
- Our Problem (Earache, 1998)
- 9-13 (Relapse, 2017)
- Spleen and Goad (Relapse, 2024)

=== Other ===
- We've Learned Nothing (Man's Ruin, 1999, split CD with Church of Misery and 10")
- Ruined by Idiots (Maniac Beast, 2003 compilation release)
