= Back from the Abyss =

Studio album by Orange Goblin
- Released: 2014
- Studio: The Animal Farm
- Genre: Stoner metal, heavy metal
- Length: 54:10
- Label: Candlelight Records

Orange Goblin chronology
A Eulogy for the Damned (2012)	Back from the Abyss (2014)	The Wolf Bites Back (2018)

Back from the Abyss is the eighth studio album by English heavy metal band Orange Goblin. It was recorded at The Animal Farm (London), and it was released on 6 October 2014 in Europe and 7 October 2014 in the United States under the label Candlelight Records. The album received positive reviews from Blabbermouth and Metal Injection.

== Track listing ==
1. "Sabbath Hex" – 4:47
2. "Übermensch" – 3:57
3. "The Devil's Whip" – 2:15
4. "Demon Blues" – 4:40
5. "Heavy Lies the Crown" – 6:19
6. "Into the Arms of Morpheus" – 7:07
7. "Mythical Knives" – 4:48
8. "Bloodzilla" – 4:10
9. "The Abyss" – 5:33
10. "Titan" – 1:59
11. "Blood of Them" – 5:47
12. "The Shadow Over Innsmouth" – 2:53

== Personnel ==
- Ben Ward – vocals
- Joe Hoare – guitar
- Chris Turner – drums
- Martyn Millard – bass
