= Astragalus linifolius =

Grand Junction milkvetch

Conservation status
- Vulnerable (NatureServe)

Scientific classification
- Kingdom: Plantae
- Clade: Embryophytes
- Clade: Tracheophytes
- Clade: Angiosperms
- Clade: Eudicots
- Clade: Rosids
- Order: Fabales
- Family: Fabaceae
- Subfamily: Faboideae
- Genus: Astragalus
- Species: A. linifolius

Binomial name
- Astragalus linifolius Osterh.

Species of legume

Astragalus linifolius is a species of flowering plant in the legume family known by the common name Grand Junction milkvetch. It is endemic to Colorado in the United States, where it is only found on the Uncompahgre Plateau in Delta, Mesa, and Montrose Counties. There are 21 occurrences, mostly in the general vicinity of Grand Junction.

This perennial herb grows up to 50 centimeters in height. In May and June it produces many white flowers with purple-tinged keels. The fruit is a red legume pod. It grows on adobe and sandstone in pinyon-juniper woodland and sagebrush habitat.

This species is known to absorb selenium.
