= Goatsnake Vol. 1 =

Studio album by Goatsnake
- Released: 1999
- Genre: Doom metal, stoner metal
- Length: 36:48
- Label: Man's Ruin Records; Rise Above Records

Goatsnake chronology
Man of Light (1998)	Goatsnake Vol. 1 (1999)	Goatsnake/Burning Witch (2000)

Professional ratings
Review scores
Source	Rating
AllMusic	3/5 stars

Vol. 1 is the debut album by American doom metal band Goatsnake. It includes the former rhythm section of The Obsessed, consisting of Guy Pinhas and Greg Rogers, as well as Greg Anderson of Sunn O))) and Pete Stahl of Scream and Wool.

== Track listing ==
All tracks are written by Goatsnake.

No.	Title	Length
1.	"Slippin' the Stealth"	3:15
2.	"Innocent"	3:32
3.	"What Love Remains"	6:50
4.	"IV"	4:31
5.	"Mower"	6:05
6.	"Dog Catcher"	2:32
7.	"Lord of Los Feliz"	5:06
8.	"Trower"	4:57

== Personnel ==
- Pete Stahl – vocals, harmonica
- Greg Anderson – guitar
- Guy Pinhas – bass
- Greg Rogers – drums
- Danny Frankel – additional percussion
