= The Machine That Won the War (album) =

Studio album by Sheavy
- Released: 2007
- Genre: Stoner metal
- Label: Candlelight Records
- Producer: Sheavy, Don Ellis

Sheavy chronology
Republic? (2005)	The Machine That Won the War (2007)	The Golden Age of Daredevils (2010)

Professional ratings
Review scores
Source	Rating
kvltsite.com	link

The Machine That Won the War is the sixth release by Canadian metal band Sheavy. It was released in 2007 on Candlelight Records. The album was released with a limited edition live DVD produced by Studio 709 featuring footage that was shot on March 3 at the Holy Heart Auditorium in St. John's. The cover artwork was created by Eliran Kantor.

== Track ending ==
1. "The Sleeping Assassin" - 2:49
2. "Demon Soldiers" - 3:39
3. "Humanoid" - 3:51
4. "Dawn of the Black Orchid" - 3:56
5. "Aboard the Mothership" - 3:14
6. "Rings of Saturn" - 2:44
7. "Here Falls the Shadow" - 4:10
8. "Lords of Radiation" - 3:01
9. "The Dark Carnival" - 3:43
10. "Where Earth Meets Sky" - 4:17
11. "One of Us Must Be Dead" - 3:26
12. "The Gunfighters" - 4:22
