= Blue Sky Mind =

Studio album by Sheavy
- Released: 1996
- Genre: Stoner rock, stoner metal
- Label: Dallas Tarr Records

Sheavy chronology
Blue Sky Mind (1996)	The Electric Sleep (1998)

Blue Sky Mind is the first studio album by Canadian metal band Sheavy, released in 1996.

== Track listing ==
1. "Mountains of Madness" – (5:23)
2. "Blue Sky Mind" – (3:46)
3. "Domelight" – (4:52)
4. "Cosmic Overdrive" – (2:38)
5. "Sea of Tomorrow" – (4:01)
6. "Supa-Hero" – (3:23)
7. "The Gun-it Jam" – (8:03)
8. "Psycho Universe" (live) – (3:34)
9. "First" – (3:29)
10. "Shining Path" – (3:31)
11. "Dalas Tar" – (3:03)
12. "The Everlasting" – (4:18)
13. "Dreamer's Mind" – (4:55)
14. "Lonely and Me" – (4:22)
15. "Crock" – (2:51)
16. "Month of Sundays" – (4:19)

Tracks 9–16 are considered bonus tracks and are not listed on the back of the album. The album insert states that the bonus songs are taken from the "Slaves to Fashion" demo cassette. Bonus track names were taken from the official sHeavy website. Two songs that were present on the "Slaves to Fashion" cassette are absent, the original 4-track recording of Psycho Universe, and Boogie Woogie Baby.

Sea of Tomorrow is the only Sheavy song sung in falsetto.
Dalas Tar spelled backwards is Rat Salad, a song from Black Sabbath's Paranoid album. The album insert spells this track as dalaS taR hand written in inverse with a capital R & S.
Month of Sundays is spelled Month of Sundaes in the album insert.

The band was never entirely happy with the sound quality of the "Blue Sky Mind" material on the album, which sounded superior before it was mastered. A remastered edition was released on limited edition vinyl in 2007 with the following track list:

1. "Mountains of Madness"
2. "Blue Sky Mind"
3. "Domelight"
4. "Cosmic Overdrive"
5. "Sea of Tomorrow"
6. "Supa-Hero"
7. "The Gun-it Jam"
8. "Truckload O' Lovin"
