= Firebird (band) =

British blues-rock band

- Origin: United Kingdom
- Genres: Blues rock, stoner rock
- Years active: 1999–2011
- Labels: Rise Above Records; Music for Nations; Steamhammer Records
- Past members: Bill Steer; Ludwig Witt; Greyum May; Leo Smee; Tom Broman; Tobias Nilsson; Roger Nilsson; George Atlagic; Al Steer; Harry Armstrong; Smok Smoczkiewicz; Tom Sutton; Terry Waker

Firebird were a British blues-rock power trio founded by Bill Steer in 1999. The music style, reminiscent of 1960s rock bands such as Cream, is a radical departure from Steer's previous work with grindcore pioneers Napalm Death and Carcass.

== History ==
Firebird came together in 1999, when Steer teamed up with Cathedral bassist Leo Smee and Spiritual Beggars drummer Ludwig Witt. This line-up recorded both Firebird (2000) and Deluxe (2001). Both bassist and drummer departed due to commitments with their primary bands before a 2001 European tour, that saw Steer teaming up with Blind Dog bassist Tobias Nilsson and Quill drummer George Atlagic. In 2002 Steer announced yet another line-up consisting of drummer Atlagic and Quill and Spiritual Beggars bassist Roger Nilsson. This line-up recorded 2003's No. 3. Since then many line-up changes occurred but significantly Steer reunited with Witt on 2006's Hot Wings and have remained the core of the line up ever since recording two more albums, 2009's Grand Union and 2010's Double Diamond.

Eventually the band on 3 April 2012, announced that they had disbanded. The band wrote on its official Facebook page:

As some of you are probably already aware, at the end of 2011 Firebird decided to call it a day. The reasons are too numerous to go into here. But we would like to thank everyone, who helped the band over the years, and the friends we made up and down the country, as well as the many lovely people we met overseas. [...]

— Firebird"

== Discography ==
- Firebird CD (2000 Rise Above Records)
- Deluxe CD/LP (2001 Music for Nations)
- No.3 CD/LP (2003 Steamhammer Records)
- Hot Wings CD/LP (2006 Rise Above Records)
- Grand Union CD/LP (2009 Rise Above Records)
- Double Diamond CD/LP (2011 Rise Above Records)

== Members ==
- Bill Steer – guitar, vocals, harmonica (1999–2011)
- Ludwig Witt – drums (1999–2001; 2005–2011)
- Greyum May - bass (2009–2011)
- Leo Smee – bass guitar (1999–2001)
- Tom Broman – drums (2001)
- Tobias Nilsson – bass guitar (2001)
- Roger Nilsson – bass guitar (2002)
- George Atlagic – drums (2002)
- Al Steer – bass guitar (2003–2006)
- Harry Armstrong – bass guitar (2006–2007)
- Smok Smoczkiewicz – bass guitar (2007–2009)
- Tom Sutton - bass guitar (2009)
- Terry Waker - bass guitar (2009)
