= Time Travelling Blues =

Studio album by Orange Goblin
- Released: 2 February 1999
- Recorded: 2–15 June 1998 at The Square Centre, Nottingham
- Genre: Stoner metal
- Length: 71:00
- Label: Rise Above, The Music Cartel
- Producer: Dave Chang

Orange Goblin chronology
Chrono.Naut/Nuclear Guru (1997)	Time Travelling Blues (1999)	Orange Goblin/Alabama Thunderpussy (2000)

Professional ratings
Review scores
Source	Rating
AllMusic	2.5/5 stars

Time Travelling Blues is the second studio album by English stoner metal band Orange Goblin, released in 1998 on Rise Above Records and The Music Cartel. In 2002, it was re-released by Rise Above as a double CD packaged with the band's debut album Frequencies from Planet Ten (1997). This version included a cover of Trouble's "Black Shapes of Doom" as a bonus track on the Time Travelling Blues disc. This track was originally released on the Bastards Will Pay: A Tribute to Trouble compilation album and was also included on the original Japanese press of Time Travelling Blues.

== Track listing ==
No.	Title	Length
1.	"Blue Snow"	4:22
2.	"Solarisphere"	6:09
3.	"Shine"	6:56
4.	"The Man Who Invented Time"	3:48
5.	"Diesel"	2:46
6.	"Snail Hook"	5:48
7.	"Nuclear Guru"	6:16
8.	"Lunarville 7, Airlock 3"	4:31
9.	"Time Travelling Blues (the song lasts 6:40; the hidden track "Sober Up" begins at 21:40.)"	30:24

== Personnel ==
- Ben Ward – vocals
- Pete O'Malley – guitar
- Joe Hoare – guitar
- Martyn Millard – bass
- Chris Turner – drums
