= Sea of Green =

- Origin: Toronto, Ontario, Canada
- Genres: Rock
- Years active: 1999–2004
- Past members: Travis Cardinal; Eric Kuthe; Chris Bender; Matt Dowd

Sea of Green were a Canadian rock band based in Toronto. The group combined elements of metal and psychedelia into their sound, which, because of obvious drug references in many of their lyrics, Sea of Green is often classified as stoner rock.

== History ==
The band was formed in 1999 by Travis Cardinal, Eric Kuthe on bass, and Chris Bender. In 2000 they signed with the Music Cartel label. In 2000 they released a six-track EP, Northern Lights.

The band's first full-length album, Time to Fly, came out in 2001. It was produced by Nick Blagona.

On their final album, Chemical Vacation, drummer Matt Dowd was introduced to the line-up. The album was released in 2002. In 2004, the band broke up amidst long-standing difficulties with their record label.

== Discography ==
- Northern Lights EP (2000)
- Time to Fly (2001)
- Chemical Vacation (2003)

== Compilation appearances ==
- Doomed - "Move the Mountains" (This Dark Reign 2000)
- "Knuckletracks XXXII" - "Annihilation" (Brave Words & Bloody Knuckles 2001)
- High Volume: The Stoner Rock Collection - "High For The Ride" (High Times Records 2004)
