= Jade (British band) =

English folk rock band

Jade was an English folk rock band founded in 1970 by Dave Waite & Marianne Segal, who had been performing as a folk duo since the mid-1960s. In the United States the group was known as Marianne Segal and Silver Jade. Jade consisted of Segal (songwriter, vocals, guitar, percussion), Waite (guitar, banjo, bass and vocals) and Rod Edwards (keyboards, bass and vocals).

Their album Fly On Strangewings (DJLPS 407) was recorded in March 1970, at Trident Studios, Soho, London. The album was produced by John Miller and engineered by Robin Cable for DJM Records. The following musicians contributed to the album; James Litherland – guitar; Pete Sears – bass; Michael Rosen – guitar; Clem Cattini – drums; Terry Cox – drums; Pete York – drums; Mick Waller – drums; Harry Reynolds – bass; Phil Dennys - string arrangements. The album featured harpsichord, violin as well as guitar instrumentation, combined with male and female vocal harmonies.

Jade disbanded in the autumn of 1971. They reformed for a single performance in November 2004 to mark the CD reissue of their album.

The 2004 reissue of "Fly On Strangewings" on CD added a couple of bonus tracks. The bonus tracks were recorded after the original LP was released in 1970 and include previously unreleased material with John Wetton on bass.
