= Sally (band) =

American indie rock band from Chicago

- Origin: Chicago, Illinois
- Genres: Indie rock
- Years active: 2003–present
- Labels: Paribus Records
- Members: Charlie Deets - vocals, guitar Melissa Neis - bass guitar Mark Berlin - guitar
- Past members: Jeff Shafar - drums Hunter Morris - drums Trip Small - drums Nick Smalkowski - drums Deric Criss - drums

Sally (styled as sally) is an American Indie rock band from Chicago, Illinois.

== Biography ==
Sally was formed in 2003 by Charlie Deets and Melissa Neis. Their friend, Jeff Shafar later joined the band on drums. Neither Melissa nor Jeff had any formal training on their respective instruments prior to the band's formation.

Recording their first album at Gravity Studios in Chicago, Illinois, the band met Mark Berlin, an engineer who later joined the band as a second guitarist.

After a series of drummer changes and EPs, the band recorded their second full-length album with Nick Smalkowski on drums called "Long Live the New Flesh," released on Paribus Records in June 2007.

Most of their artwork has been done by Melissa Neis and the majority of their recordings by Mark Berlin.

The band apparently broke up in November 2007 when they published a lengthy letter of explanation on their Myspace blog. They played a final show at The Empty Bottle in Chicago on November 19, 2007 minus their drummer Nick Smalkowski. Mostly using drum machines and playing acoustic, the band ended by playing 'racquetball' from their first album with Deric Criss (Aleks and the Drummer) playing drums.

In May 2008, a cryptic message appeared on the band's Myspace blog:

"i'm not a mak a damia nut."

Over the next couple months, new songs appeared on the page for short periods of time and in September 2008 the band released a new EP named 'Sunday,' suggesting that they are still active.

== Appearances ==
Chicago based Sally has toured the eastern United States in the summer of 2005 and 2006 playing at venues throughout New York, Pennsylvania, Delaware, Massachusetts, Ohio, Vermont, Connecticut, Michigan, Iowa, Indiana, Washington DC, and Illinois. sally also played at CMJ in November 2006.

== Trivia ==
The band name is styled as sally, as it is intended to reference the verb, and is more easily differentiated from the common female name.

== Discography ==
1. Sally (2004)
2. The Snow EP (2004)
3. God Answered My Speed (2005) (b-sides digital only release)
4. The Attrition EP (2005)
5. The Picardy Third EP (2006)
6. Long Live the New Flesh (2007)
7. Smoke and Mirrors (2008) (b-sides digital only release)
8. Sunday EP (2008)
