= Orange Goblin =

English heavy metal band

- Also known as: Our Haunted Kingdom (1995–1996)
- Origin: London, England
- Genres: Stoner metal; heavy metal
- Years active: 1995–2025
- Labels: Rise Above; The Music Cartel; Sanctuary; Candlelight; Man's Ruin; Mayan; Eccentric Man
- Past members: Joe Hoare; Martyn Millard; Pete O'Malley; Chris Turner; Ben Ward; Harry Armstrong
- Website: orangegoblinofficial.com

Orange Goblin were an English stoner metal band from London. Formed in 1995, the band's most recent lineup consisted of singer Ben Ward, guitarist Joe Hoare, drummer Chris Turner, and bassist Harry Armstrong. Their final album Science, Not Fiction was released in July 2024.

== History ==
Orange Goblin was originally formed in 1995 under the name Our Haunted Kingdom, with original bassist Martyn Millard and fifth member Pete O'Malley on rhythm guitar. The band released a split 7-inch single, Electric Wizard/Our Haunted Kingdom, with Electric Wizard in 1996 on Rise Above Records before changing their name to Orange Goblin. The first three studio albums under the name Orange Goblin—Frequencies from Planet Ten (1997), Time Travelling Blues (1998) and The Big Black (2000)—were in the stoner metal and doom metal genres, and have also been described as space rock. However, starting with 2002's Coup de Grace, they began to add punk rock, hard rock, and other influences to their sound. The album Thieving from the House of God was released in 2004 and featured a cover of ZZ Top's "Just Got Paid".

Their first five releases were issued by Rise Above Records. O'Malley left the band in 2004 to pursue a career as an artist and was not replaced. Their 2007 album Healing Through Fire was released on Mayan/Sanctuary Records. In 2008, the band announced that they had signed with Candlelight Records. Two new songs were revealed in May 2009, though the associated album was delayed until 2012.

In mid-2010, the band's back catalog was reissued on Rise Above Records in digipak form. Their long-delayed seventh album A Eulogy for the Damned was released in February 2012. The album earned the band critical acclaim. The band then embarked on a world tour in 2013, playing 161 shows across 28 countries.

In March 2013, Orange Goblin released A Eulogy for the Fans: Orange Goblin Live 2012. The CD/DVD package included the band's complete performances at Bloodstock Festival on 11 August 2012 and Hellfest in France on 15 June 2012. In October 2014, the band released the studio album Back from the Abyss through Candlelight Records.

In December 2015, the band undertook a 13-date 20th anniversary tour of the United Kingdom. In December 2016, singer Ben Ward received national media coverage in the UK for setting up a JustGiving campaign aiming to raise money for the staff of music publisher TeamRock who were laid off when the company went into administration. As part of the fundraising effort, Orange Goblin played a gig at the Black Heart in Camden, London on 5 January 2017 with all proceeds going to the campaign.

Orange Goblin's ninth studio album, The Wolf Bites Back, was released in June 2018. In October 2020, bassist Martyn Millard announced his amicable retirement from the band; he was replaced in mid-2021 by Harry Armstrong. The band's first new album in six years, Science, Not Fiction, was released on 19 July 2024.

On 22 January 2025, the band announced their intention to split-up by the end of their 30th anniversary tour. Their final tour took place in December across the UK and Ireland, with the final show taking place on 17 December 2025 at the O2 Kentish Town Forum in London.

== Band members ==
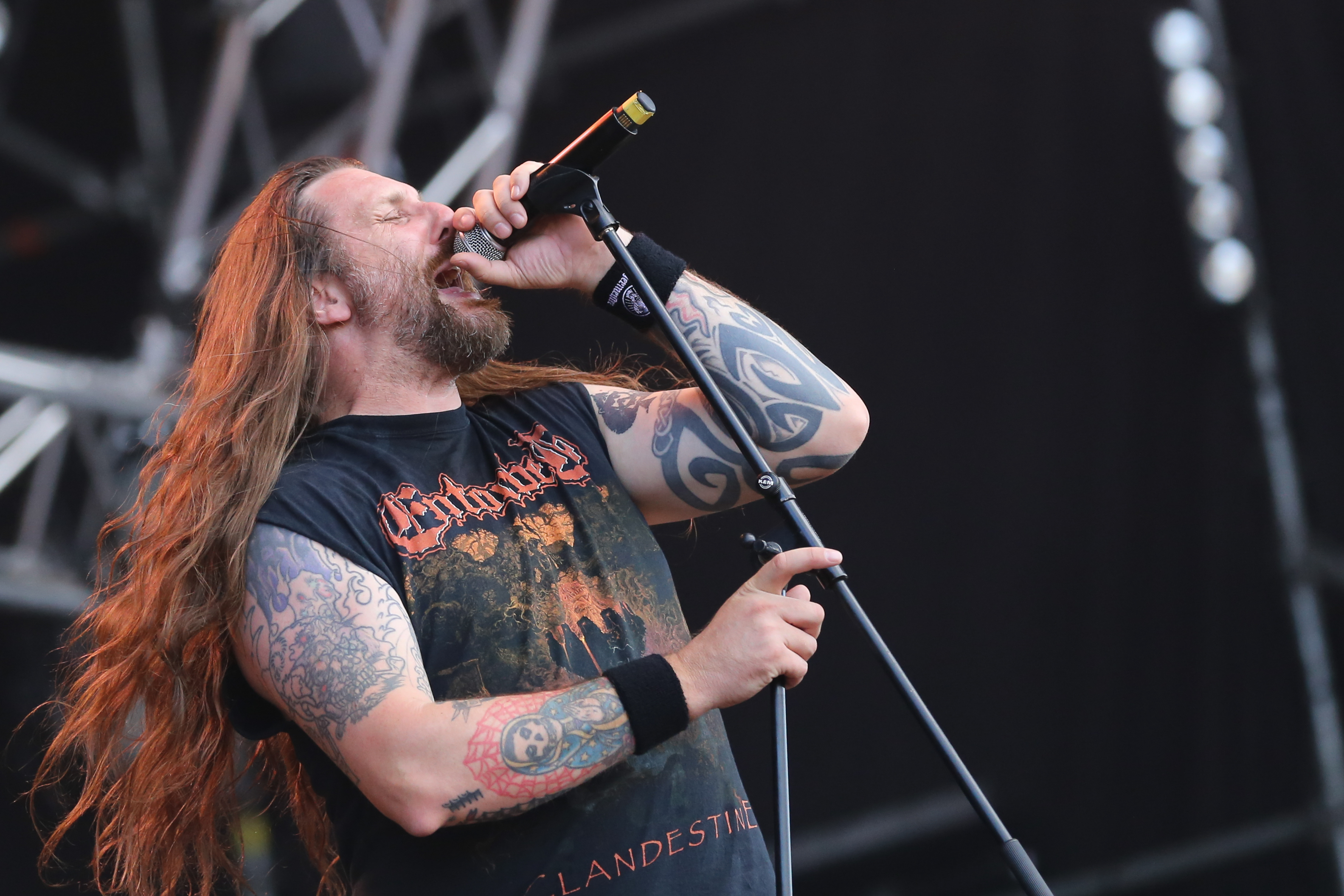
Ben Ward at the Woodstock Festival Poland 2017

Final lineup

- Ben Ward – vocals (1995–2025)
- Joe Hoare – guitar (1995–2025)
- Chris Turner – drums (1995–2025)
- Harry Armstrong – bass (2021–2025)

Former

- Pete O'Malley – guitar (1995–2004)
- Martyn Millard – bass (1995–2020)

Session

- Duncan Gibbs – keyboards on Frequencies from Planet Ten
- Jason Graham – keyboards on Healing Through Fire

Timeline

== Discography ==
Studio albums

- Frequencies from Planet Ten (1997)
- Time Travelling Blues (1998)
- The Big Black (2000)
- Coup de Grace (2002)
- Thieving from the House of God (2004)
- Healing Through Fire (2007)
- A Eulogy for the Damned (2012) UK #149
- Back from the Abyss (2014) UK #98
- The Wolf Bites Back (2018)
- Science, Not Fiction (2024)

Live albums

- A Eulogy for the Fans (2013)
- Rough & Ready, Live & Loud (2020)

EPs

- Electric Wizard/Our Haunted Kingdom (1996)
- Nuclear Guru (1997)
- Chrono.Naut / Nuclear Guru (1997)
- The Time (1998)
- Orange Goblin/Alabama Thunderpussy (2000)

Singles

- "Some You Win, Some You Lose" (2004)

Compilation appearances

- "Saruman's Wish" on Dark Passages II (1996)
- "Aquatic Fanatic" on Stoned Revolution – The Ultimate Trip (1998)
- "Quincy the Pig Boy" on Rise 13 (1999)
- "Black Shapes of Doom" on Bastards Will Pay: Tribute to Trouble (1999)
- "No Law" on High Volume (2004)
