= Cathedral discography =

The discography of the English doom metal band Cathedral consists of ten studio albums, eight EPs, a number of singles, two live albums and two collections. Led by ex-Napalm Death vocalist Lee Dorrian, the band was signed to Earache Records in 1991. They briefly switched to Spitfire Records in 2002 and released The VIIth Coming. Later, they switched to Nuclear Blast and released two more studio albums. Cathedral's final album, The Last Spire was released through Dorrian's own label, Rise Above.

== Studio albums ==
Title	Album details	Peak chart positions						Sales
Title	Album details	JPN	UK	FIN	SWE	GRC	US Heat	Sales
Forest of Equilibrium	Released: 21 October 1991; Label: Earache, Relativity; Formats: CD, CS, DualDisc, LP, DL	—	—	—	—	40	—	
The Ethereal Mirror	Released: 24 May 1993; Label: Earache, Columbia; Formats: CD, CS, DualDisc, LP, DL	—	—	—	—	40	—	US: 22,629+
The Carnival Bizarre	Released: 26 September 1995; Label: Earache; Formats: CD, CD+DVD, CS, LP, DL	73	130	—	—	—	—	
Supernatural Birth Machine	Released: 12 November 1996; Label: Earache; Formats: CD, CS, LP, DL	56	—	—	—	—	—	
Caravan Beyond Redemption	Released: 6 December 1998; Label: Earache; Formats: CD, LP, DL	64	—	—	—	—	—	US: 1,946+
Endtyme	Released: 26 February 2001; Label: Earache; Formats: CD, LP, DL	57	—	—	—	—	—	
The VIIth Coming	Released: 5 November 2002; Label: Spitfire; Formats: CD, LP, DL	—	—	—	—	—	—	
The Garden of Unearthly Delights	Released: 26 September 2005; Label: Nuclear Blast; Formats: CD, LP, DL	154	—	—	—	—	—	US: 400+
The Guessing Game	Released: 26 March 2010; Label: Nuclear Blast; Formats: CD, LP, DL	103	—	—	—	22	—	US: 700+
The Last Spire	Released: 29 April 2013; Label: Rise Above, Metal Blade; Formats: CD, LP, DL	121	—	44	43	—	24	US: 920+
"—" denotes a recording that did not chart or was not released in that territory.

== EPs ==
Title	Album details
Soul Sacrifice	Released: 17 August 1992; Label: Earache; Formats: CD, CS, LP, DL
Twylight Songs	Released: 1993; Label: Ultimatum; Formats: LP
Statik Majik	Released: 5 April 1994; Label: Earache; Formats: CD, CS, LP, DL
In Memorium	Released: 1994; Label: Rise above; Formats: CD
Cosmic Requiem	Released: 30 August 1994; Label: Earache, Columbia; Formats: CD, CS
Hopkins (The Witchfinder General)	Released: 9 April 1996; Label: Earache; Formats: CD, CS, LP, DL
Live in London	Released: 10 December 2010; Label: Earache; Formats: DL
A New Ice Age	Released: 2 December 2011; Label: Rise Above; Formats: LP

== Live albums ==
Title	Album details
Anniversary	Released: 31 October 2011; Label: Rise Above, Metal Blade; Formats: CD, DL
Freak Winter	Released: 03 April 2020; Label: Rise Above; Formats: Double LP

== Demos ==
Title	Album details
In Memorium	Released: October 1990; Label: Self-released; Formats: CS
Demo No. 2: Forest of Equilibrium sessions	Released: 1991; Label: Self-released; Formats: CS

== Singles ==
Title	Year
Grim Luxuria	1993
Ride	1993
Twylight Songs	1993
Gargoylian	2001
Vengeance of the Blind Dead (Flexi Version)	2013

== Compilation albums ==
Title	Album details
In Memoriam	Released: 1999; Label: Rise Above; Formats: CD
The Serpent's Gold	Released: 21 June 2004; Label: Earache; Formats: CD, DL

== Split albums ==
Title	Album details	Notes
Rock Hard Presents: Gods of Grind	Released: December 1991; Label: Earache; Formats: CD	split with Entombed, Carcass and Confessor
Cutting Through Columbia Hard Music	Released: 1992; Label: Columbia; Formats: CS	split with Fight and Alice in Chains
Gods of Grind	Released: 1992; Label: Earache; Formats: CD	split with Entombed, Carcass and Confessor
New Metal Messiahs!	Released: June 1995; Label: Kerrang! Magazine; Formats: CD	split with My Dying Bride, Paradise Lost and Pitchshifter

== Video albums ==
Title	Album details
Our God Has Landed	Released: 18 January 2000; Label: Earache; Formats: VHS

== Music videos ==
Year	Title	Directed	Album
1991	"Ebony Tears"	James McBride	Forest Of Equilibrium
1992	"Autumn Twilight"	Jefferson Spady	Soul Sacrifice
1993	"Midnight Mountain"	James McBride	The Ethereal Mirror
1993	"Ride"	Angus Cameron	The Ethereal Mirror
1994	"Cosmic Funeral"	—	Statik Majik
1995	"Hopkins (The Witchfinder General)"	Nigel Wingrove	Hopkins
1996	"Stained Glass Horizon"	—	Supernatural Birth Machine
1999	"Black Sunday"	—	Caravan Beyond Redemption
2013	"Tower Of Silence"	Paraffin City Productions	The Last Spire
