= The Serpent's Gold =

Compilation album by Cathedral
- Released: 21 June 2004
- Recorded: 1989–2003
- Genre: Doom metal, stoner metal
- Length: 157:08
- Label: Earache
- Producer: Dan Tobin, Garry Jennings, Lee Dorian

Cathedral chronology
The VIIth Coming (2002)	The Serpent's Gold (2004)	The Garden of Unearthly Delights (2005)

Professional ratings
Review scores
Source	Rating
AllMusic	3.5/5 stars
Collector's Guide to Heavy Metal	9/10
Drowned in Sound	7/10
Exclaim!	Favourable
Under the Volcano	Favourable

The Serpent's Gold is a compilation album by British doom metal band Cathedral, released on 21 June 2004 through Earache Records. It consists of two discs, featuring a "Best of" collection titled "The Serpent's Treasure" and a collection of demos and rarities titled "The Serpent's Chest".

== Release ==
Earache released the album in the United Kingdom on 21 June 2004 and in the United States on 27 July 2004. The booklet contains an interview with singer Lee Dorrian and a track-by-track interview about the songs on the second disc with guitarist Garry Jennings.

== Track listing ==
Disc 1 – The Serpent's Treasure
No.	Title	Lyrics	Music	Source	Length
1.	"Ride"	Garry Jennings, Lee Dorrian	Jennings, Dorrian	The Ethereal Mirror	4:46
2.	"Hopkins (Witchfinder General)"	Dorrian, Jennings	Dorrian, Jennings	The Carnival Bizarre	5:18
3.	"Autumn Twilight"	Mark Griffiths	Jennings, Griffiths	Soul Sacrifice	5:49
4.	"Midnight Mountain"	Jennings, Dorrian	Jennings, Dorrian	The Ethereal Mirror	4:55
5.	"Soul Sacrifice"	Griffiths	Jennings	Soul Sacrifice	4:32
6.	"Enter the Worms"	Adam Lehan, Dorrian, David Bianco	Lehan, Dorrian, Bianco	The Ethereal Mirror	6:05
7.	"Stained Glass Horizon"	Dorrian, Jennings	Dorrian, Jennings	Supernatural Birth Machine	5:30
8.	"Vampire Sun"	Jennings, Dorrian, Scott Carlson	Jennings, Dorrian, Carlson	The Carnival Bizarre	4:07
9.	"Cosmic Funeral"	Jennings, Dorrian	Jennings, Dorrian	Statik Majik	6:59
10.	"Ebony Tears"	Dorrian	Jennings	Forest of Equilibrium	7:42
11.	"Melancholy Emperor"			Endtyme	5:35
12.	"Equilibrium"	Dorrian	Jennings	Forest of Equilibrium	6:04
13.	"Utopian Blaster"	Dorrian, Jennings	Dorrian, Jennings	The Carnival Bizarre	5:38
14.	"Voodoo Fire"	Dorrian, Jennings, Leo Smee, Brian Dixon	Dorrian, Jennings, Smee, Dixon	Caravan Beyond Redemption	5:11
15.	"Imprisoned in Flesh"	Jennings, Dorrian	Jennings, Dorrian	The Ethereal Mirror	1:38

Disc 2 – The Serpent's Chest
No.	Title	Writer(s)	Length
1.	"Hide & Seek"		1:41
2.	"Neophytes for Serpent Eve" (Demo Version)		8:16
3.	"Violet Breath"		3:00
4.	"Night of the Seagulls" (Demo Version)		5:24
5.	"Magic Mountain"		6:16
6.	"A Funeral Request" (Live in Brussels, Belgium 18/4/94)		9:06
7.	"The Olde Oak Tree"		4:01
8.	"Schizoid Puppeteer"		12:14
9.	"Carnival Bizarre" (Demo Version)		9:30
10.	"Rabies"	Witchfinder General	4:41
11.	"Blue Light" (Live in Tokyo, Japan 30/5/01)		9:56
12.	"Commiserating the Celebration (of Life)" (Demo Version)		3:14

== Personnel ==
=== Cathedral ===
- Lee Dorrian – vocals, compilation
- Garry Jennings – bass (disc 1: 1, 4, 6, 15, disc 2: 1–3, 5, 8, 10, 11), guitar, drums (disc 2: 10), keyboard (disc 2: 4, 9), backing vocals (disc 2: 9), tambourine (disc 1: 3, 5), compilation
- Brian Dixon – drums (disc 1: 2, 7, 9, 11, 13, 14, disc 2: 8, 11)
- Scott Carlson – bass (disc 2: 4, 6, 9)
- Adam Lehan – bass (disc 2: 7), guitar (disc 1: 1, 3–6, 9, 10, 12, 15, disc 2: 1–3, 5, 7, 12)
- Mark Griffiths – bass (disc 1: 3, 5, 10, 12, disc 2: 2, 12)
- Mark Ramsey Wharton – drums (disc 1: 1, 3–6, 9, 15, disc 2: 1, 2, 5, 7), Hammond organ (disc 1: 3, 5), penny whistle (disc 2: 1), flute (disc 2: 5)
- Leo Smee – bass (disc 1: 2, 7, 8, 11, 13, 14, disc 2: 8, 11)
- Ben Mochrie – drums (disc 2: 2, 12)

=== Live musicians ===
- Victor Griffin – guitar (disc 2: 6)
- Joe Hasselvander – drums (disc 2: 6)
- Dave Hornyak – drums (disc 2: 4, 9)

=== Technical personnel ===
- Matthew Vickerstaff – design, layout
- Dave Patchett – cover artwork
- Olivier Badin – liner notes
- John Paul – mastering
- Dan Tobin – compilation
