= Harrogate High School =

Academy in Harrogate, North Yorkshire, England

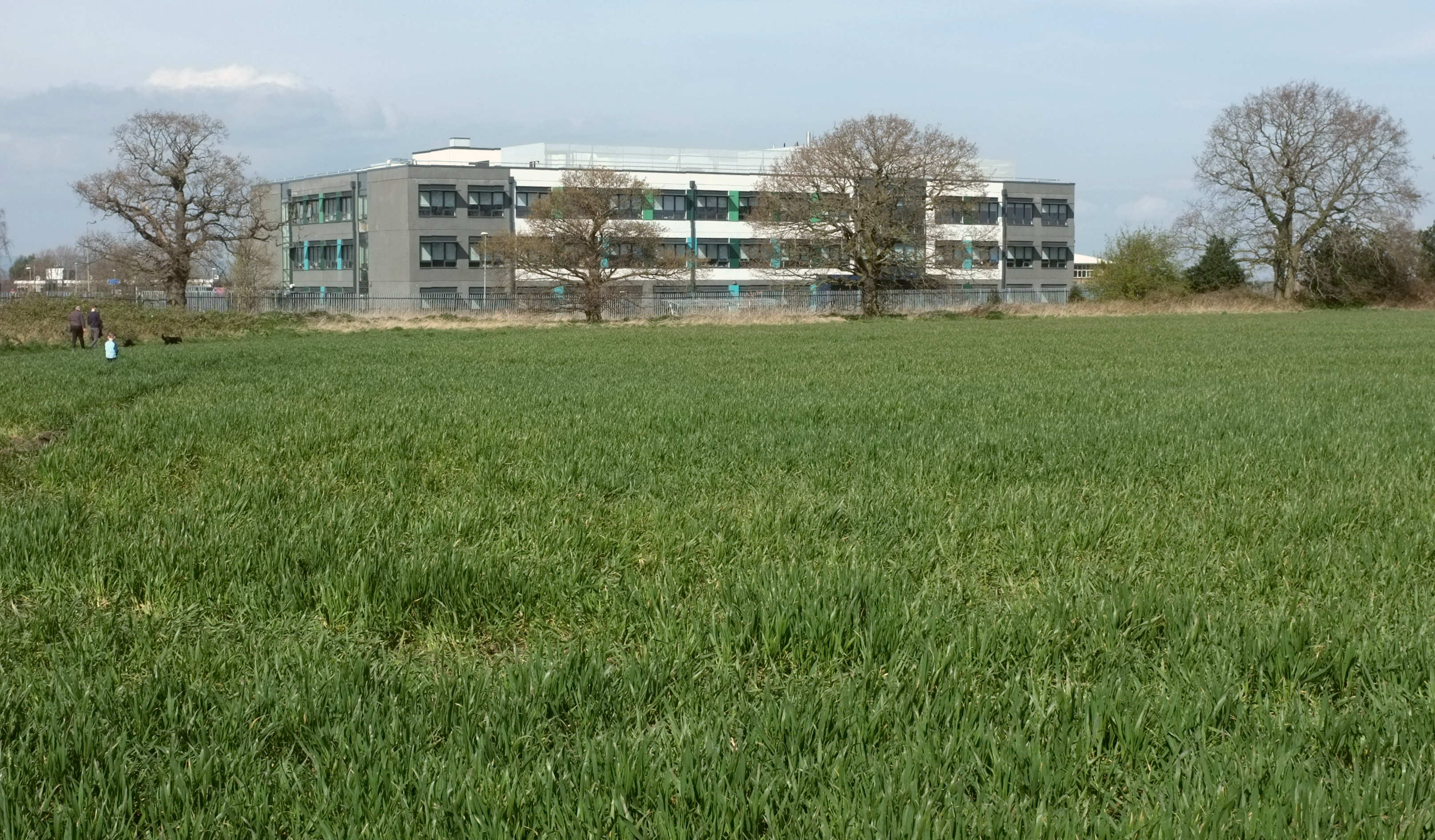
- View from the south

Location
- Ainsty Road; Harrogate, North Yorkshire, HG1 4AP; England; 54.0014°N 1.5176°W

Information
- Type: Academy
- Motto: Learning First
- Established: 1962
- Specialist: Sports College
- Department for Education URN: 138190 Tables
- Ofsted: Reports
- Head of Governors: Ian Curtis
- Headteacher: Sukhraj Gill
- Staff: 85
- Gender: coeducational
- Age: 11 to 18
- Enrolment: 720
- Houses: Americas, Asia, Australasia, Africa
- Website: www.harrogatehighschool.co.uk

Harrogate High School is a comprehensive secondary school in Harrogate, North Yorkshire, England. It has about 720 pupils on roll and approximately 85 full-time teaching staff. The school was awarded specialist Sports College status. The Academy Head is Sukhraj Gill.

== History ==
The school was founded in 1973 as Harrogate Granby High School by the amalgamation of the original Harrogate High School with Granby Park County Secondary School. Both of these schools were established in the 1960s.

The original Harrogate High School was a grammar school that had a selective intake for those passing or assessed to be above the 11-plus entry level, and took its first pupils in September 1962. The first headmaster, until his retirement at Easter 1963, was Tom Reginald Lupton. He was succeeded by Mr F. W. Kimber of Goole, who taught German.

When Kimber arrived, the high school had 540 pupils and rising. The school, which had been built at a cost of £240,000, was formally opened upon the completion of building works on 13 March 1964 by Alderman Hyman, chairman of the West Riding County Council, deputising for Sir Edward Boyle (later Baron Boyle of Handsworth), Minister of Education. The latter, whose flight had been delayed by bad weather, paid a visit three months later when he praised the school, especially the "admirable assembly hall", library and gymnasium, and "first-class headmaster with long Grammar School experience, and a very able and well-qualified staff". By 1972 there were approximately 730 pupils on its roll.

During the speech day and prize-giving at the school on 17 March 1965, Mr F. W. Kimber said:

We headmasters ... are as a race only too delighted to report excellent examination results, but this particular group of sixth form pupils, perhaps more than any that I have met, emphasise the hollowness of a mere recital of examination performance when this is dissociated from personal qualities and the wider aspects of educational maturity. Rarely have I known sixth form pupils who have shown such balanced interests and outlook and such a sense of social service and responsibility. They have moved on to university, colleges of advanced technology, teacher training colleges, and to commerce. They have set standards of service and responsibility, which I sincerely hope future generations of High School pupils will succeed in maintaining.

The original Granby Park County Secondary School was formed by the amalgamation of New Park Secondary School and Starbeck Secondary School, opening in September 1965 in the brand new school building sited in the middle of the three schools on the campus, also with its own gymnasium, school hall and a 4-storey science/technical block. Granby Park was a secondary modern school for those below the 11-plus entry level for ages 11–16 and in those days students studied for CSE examinations. Very often, any pupil at Granby Park who wanted to enter the sixth-form to study for 'A' levels, moved to the High School's sixth-form.

== School performance ==
The school has around 600 students. The 2008 Ofsted Inspection Report found that the school is satisfactory with the capacity to improve. It also found that the extent to which learners make a positive contribution to the community, and adopt healthy lifestyles and safe practices, was good. In 2009, its pass rate for five or more GCSEs at grades A* to C was 99.3%. In 2010 the school was monitored by Ofsted who deemed the school to be "making good progress in making improvements and good progress in demonstrating a better capacity for sustained improvement."

As of 2024, the school's most recent inspection was in 2023, with an outcome of Requires Improvement.

== Notable alumni ==
- Mike Bushell – sports presenter for the BBC
- Garry Jennings – guitarist for heavy metal bands Acid Reign, Cathedral, Septic Tank and Lucifer
- Mark Wharton – guitarist for heavy metal bands Acid Reign, Cathedral, Cronos
