= Workshed =

English heavy metal band

- Origin: Harrogate, North Yorkshire, England
- Genres: Doom metal, sludge metal, experimental metal
- Years active: 2014–present
- Label: Rise Above
- Spinoff of: Cathedral, Acid Reign
- Members: Adam Lehan; Helen Storer; Scott Naylor
- Past members: Mark Wharton

Workshed is an English heavy metal band formed in Harrogate in 2014. The band consists of former Cathedral and Acid Reign members Adam Lehan and Mark Wharton, and Helen Storer. Their debut self-titled album, recorded by Jaime Arellano, was released on 13 September 2019 through Rise Above Records.

== History ==
Lehan and Wharton had both played in Harrogate thrash metal band Acid Reign together in the 1980s. Eventually, the two would find themselves in doom metal band Cathedral, however both departed after the release of Statik Majik By 2014, Lehan had approached Wharton with a number of guitar riffs he had written, leading to them beginning to write music together once again. After some time, the pair approached former-Cathedral vocalist Lee Dorian, who agreed to release their album through his label Rise Above Records. Decibel premiered the track "Safety Behaviours" off of the album on 30 August 2019 and their self-titled debut album was released on 13 September the same year. In October 2021, they announced Wharton's departure, and his replacement by Scott Naylor.

== Musical style and influences ==
The band's music has been described as doom metal, sludge metal and experimental metal. Outburn described the sound of their debut album as "redolent of all the great doom and sludge heroes of the past and thrillingly fresh and inventive, songs like rampaging opener ‘The Windowpanes At The Lexington’ and the pulverising ‘Nowhere To Go’ sound very much like the finished, riff-worshipping article" as well as referring to it as "hate-doom". Whereas, Dead Rhetoric described it as "unafraid to obliterate in distortion gloom for the crux of an arrangement, then lob a serene clean passage midway through before a gargantuan low-tuned riff shatters the airspace".

They have cited influences including Motörhead, Trouble, The Obsessed and Type O Negative.

== Members ==
- Adam Lehan – vocals, guitar (2014–present), bass (2014–2019)
- Helen Storer - bass (2019–present)
- Scott Naylor – drums (2021–present)

Past

- Mark Wharton – drums (2014–2021)

== Discography ==
- Workshed (2019)
