= Cosmic Requiem =

EP by Cathedral
- Released: 1994
- Genre: Doom metal, stoner metal
- Length: 43:00
- Label: Earache, Columbia

Cathedral chronology
Statik Majik (1994)	Cosmic Requiem (1994)	The Carnival Bizarre (1995)

Cosmic Requiem is an EP by the British doom metal band Cathedral. It was released in 1994 on Earache Records. Tracks 1, 2 and 4 were originally released on the Statik Majik EP.

== Track listing ==
1. "Cosmic Funeral" – 7:01
2. "Hypnos 164" – 5:44
3. "A Funeral Request – Rebirth" – 7:33
4. "The Voyage of the Homeless Sapien" – 22:42

== Credits ==
- Lee Dorrian – vocals, production
- Garry Jennings – guitars, bass guitar, keyboards, production
- Adam Lehan – guitars
- Mark Ramsey Wharton – drums, flute
- Paul Johnson – production
- David Bianco – production on track 4
