= Lucifer I =

Studio album by Lucifer
- Released: 25 May 2015
- Recorded: February – March 2015
- Studio: Candy Bomber Studio (Berlin, Germany)
- Genre: Heavy metal; doom metal
- Length: 43:50
- Label: Rise Above
- Producer: Lucifer

Lucifer chronology
Lucifer I (2015)	Lucifer II (2018)

Singles from Lucifer I
- 1. "Anubis" Released: 7 April 2015; 2. "Izrail" Released: 19 May 2015

Lucifer I is the debut studio album by the heavy metal band Lucifer. The album was released on 25 May 2015 in Europe and 16 June 2015 in the United States by Rise Above Records. It was the only album to feature Gaz Jennings, Dino Gollnick and Andy Prestidge on guitars, bass and drums respectively.

== Background and promotion ==
Although The Oath released their self-titled debut album in 2014 via Rise Above Records to much critical acclaim, the duo of singer Johanna Sadonis and guitarist Linnéa Olsson broke up that same year. Having had big plans for The Oath, Sadonis was devastated but decided to utilize the energy she had and quickly formed Lucifer to continue making music. She said that it "was clear" Andy Prestidge, former drummer for The Oath and Angel Witch, and bassist Dino Gollnick, who was about to play with The Oath before its demise, were going to be a part of the new project. When Sadonis told Rise Above founder Lee Dorrian that she was looking for a guitar player, Dorrian recommended his bandmate from the recently disbanded Cathedral, Gaz Jennings. Jennings quickly agreed and he and Sadonis began writing songs.

Because of Jennings' work with his band Death Penalty, it was agreed that he would not play live with Lucifer or appear in promotional photos. The single "Anubis" was released on 7 April 2015 on Rise Above Records.

== Touring ==
With a spot on the bill at the April 2015 Roadburn Festival in the Netherlands approaching, Sadonis quickly booked four smaller gigs in Germany to warm up. However, after being unable to find a guitar player for their first gigs, Jennings stepped in and with a big American tour booked later, his position as live guitarist continued. The North American tour took place from 30 July to 23 August.

== Reception ==
Professional ratings
Review scores
Source	Rating
Metal Hammer	4/5 stars
Metal Injection	9/10

"Lucifer I" received positive reviews. Metal Injection gave it a nine out of ten rating, with the reviewer stating that the riffs are stronger and the songs are better and more consistently high-quality than those on the album of the same name by The Oath, which featured vocalist Johanna Sadonis before forming Lucifer. He added that Lucifer I is heavily influenced by Candlemass and Black Sabbath, but that Sadonis has a unique singing voice. Liam Yates of Metal Hammer gave it four stars out of five, writing that "the riffs are supported by strong, sing-along vocals", that the band "creates atmosphere and depth rather than going all-out", and that their "subtle approach still packs a punch".

== Track listing ==
All lyrics are written by Johanna Sadonis; all music is composed by Gaz Jennings.

Lucifer I track listing
No.	Title	Length
1.	"Abracadabra"	5:54
2.	"Purple Pyramid"	6:09
3.	"Izrael"	4:49
4.	"Sabbath"	5:19
5.	"White Mountain"	5:22
6.	"Morning Star"	5:01
7.	"Total Eclipse"	6:04
8.	"A Grave for Each One of Us"	5:12
Total length:		43:50

== Credits ==
Lucifer

- Johanna Sadonis – vocals, samples, keyboards, design
- Garry Jennings – guitar
- Dino Gollnick – bass guitar
- Andy Prestidge – drums, keyboards

Additional personnel

- Christoph Rambow – design
- Ester Segarra – photography
- Ingo Krauss – recording, mixing, mastering
