= Lucifer II =

Studio album by Lucifer
- Released: 6 July 2018
- Studio: Honk Palace (Stockholm, Sweden)
- Genre: Heavy metal; doom metal; occult rock
- Length: 41:54
- Label: Century Media
- Producer: Johanna Sadonis; Nicke Andersson

Lucifer chronology
Lucifer I (2015)	Lucifer II (2018)	Lucifer III (2020)

Singles from Lucifer II
- 1. "Faux Pharaoh" Released: 22 December 2017; 2. "California Son" Released: 4 May 2018; 3. "Dreamer" Released: 22 June 2018

Lucifer II is the second studio album by the heavy metal band Lucifer. The album was released on 6 July 2018 by Century Media Records, the band's first release on the label. It was the first album to feature Nicke Andersson and only one to feature Robin Tidebrink, both on guitars.

== Background and promotion ==
In March 2017 it was announced that Gaz Jennings and Andy Prestidge had amicably left the band. Sadonis later revealed that Jennings left in November 2016, after their European tour. On the same day Jennings told Sadonis he was leaving, she met with Swedish multi-instrumentalist Nicke Andersson, who had been asking to write songs with her for some time.

Now based out of Stockholm and signed to Century Media Records, the single "Faux Pharaoh" was released in December 2017. A second single "California Son" followed on 4 May 2018.

== Reception ==
Professional ratings
Review scores
Source	Rating
Angry Metal Guy	3/5
Blabbermouth	8/10
Distorted Sound	10/10
Metal Hammer	4/5 stars

The album received positive reviews. Jessica Howkins gave it the highest score in her review for Distorted Sound, stating that it was "more lively" than the previous album, "full of passion" and that it "flows with an inspiring rock and roll sound". In a positive review for Decibel magazine, Adrien Begrand declared it a "seductive and rhythmic" work that "immaculately pays homage to the iconic sound" and particularly highlighted the voice of singer Johanna Sadonis, which he said "draws in listeners" and "exudes more personality and passion" than on her previous recordings.

Blabbermouth's reviewer gave it eight out of ten, also praising the singer's voice and saying that "she sounds more confident on every song", and described the album as "an exciting mix of 70s-inspired hard rock sounds". In a review for Metal Hammer, Chris Chantler wrote that it is "a meaner, glam-tainted rock album that understands pop music" that is characterized by a "clearer and more elegant sound" compared to its predecessor. He gave it four stars out of five.

Angry Metal Guy gave it three out of five points, stating that "you can tell [the band] enjoyed writing the songs" and that they are "certainly more upbeat", but that they "clearly lack the weight that the riffs on their debut album created".

== Track listing ==
All lyrics are written by Johanna Sadonis; all music is composed by Nicke Andersson; "Dancing with Mr. D" was written by Mick Jagger and Keith Richards.

Lucifer II track listing
No.	Title	Length
1.	"California Son"	3:26
2.	"Dreamer"	5:47
3.	"Phoenix"	4:46
4.	"Dancing with Mr. D" (The Rolling Stones cover)	4:11
5.	"Reaper on Your Heels"	5:06
6.	"Eyes in the Sky"	4:30
7.	"Before the Sun"	3:38
8.	"Aton"	5:05
9.	"Faux Pharaoh"	5:25

== Credits ==
Lucifer

- Johanna Sadonis – vocals, production, artistic director
- Nicke Andersson – guitar, drums, production, recording, art director
- Robin Tidebrink – guitar

Additional musicians

- Rudolf de Borst – backing vocals (on the song "Dancing with Mr. D")

Additional personnel

- Ola Ersfjord – mixing
- Magnus Lindberg – mastering
- Stefan Boman – initial drum mix (on the song "Eyes in the Sky")
- Ester Segarra – photography
- Alan Forbes – logo

== Charts ==
Chart (2018)	Peak position
Belgian Albums (Ultratop Wallonia)	188
German Albums (Offizielle Top 100)	40
Swedish Albums (Sverigetopplistan)	12
Swiss Albums (Schweizer Hitparade)	68
UK Rock & Metal Albums (OCC)	18
