= With the Dead =

British doom metal band

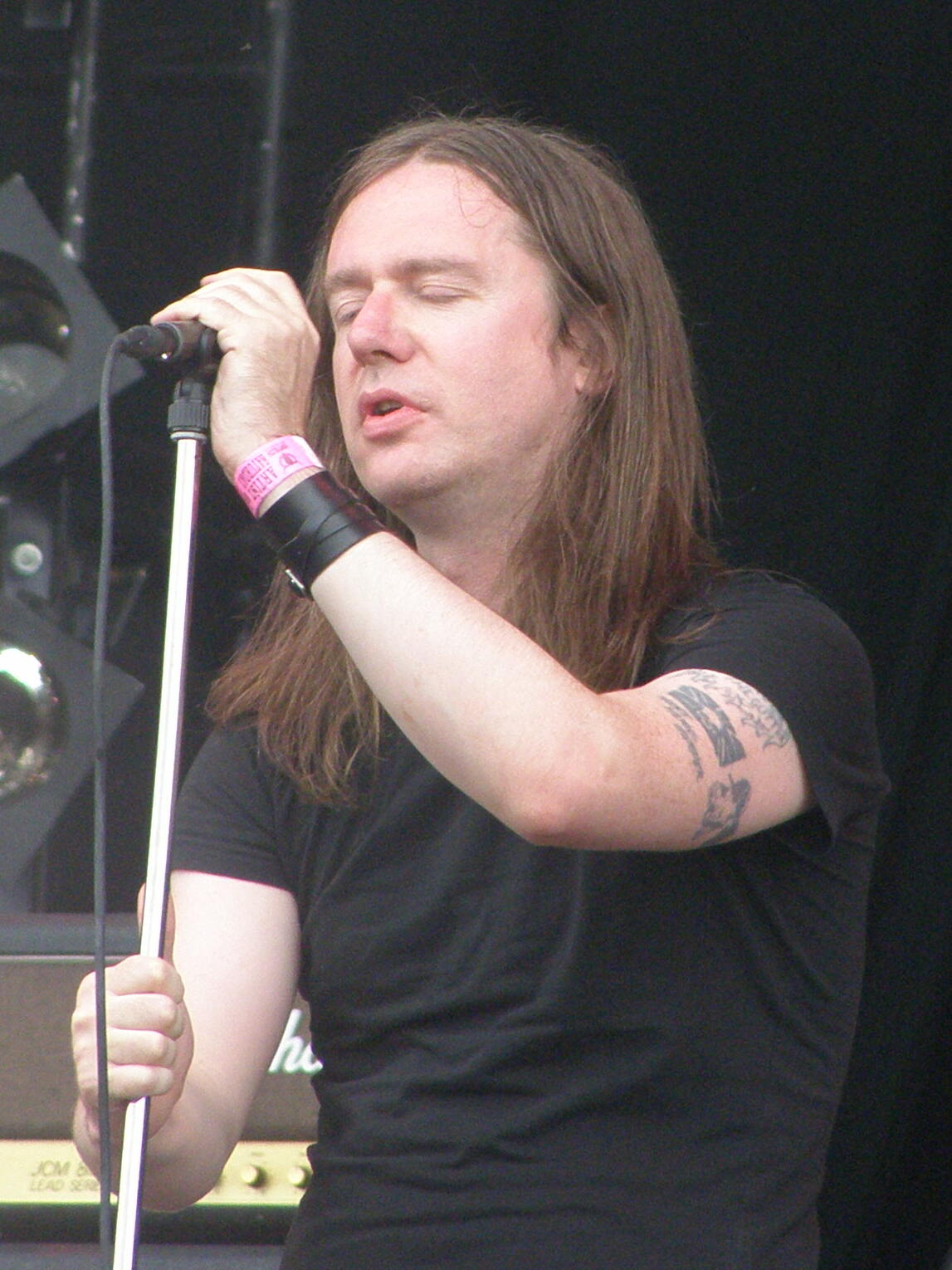
- Vocalist Lee Dorrian

Background information
- Origin: England
- Genres: Doom metal; stoner metal; sludge metal
- Years active: 2014–present
- Label: Rise Above
- Members: Lee Dorrian; Tim Bagshaw; Leo Smee; Alex Thomas
- Past members: Mark Greening

With the Dead are an English doom metal supergroup founded in 2014 by Tim Bagshaw, Mark Greening (both ex-Electric Wizard, and then of Ramesses) and Lee Dorrian (ex-Cathedral, ex-Napalm Death).

== History ==
After disbanding Cathedral, Lee Dorrian joined the former members of Electric Wizard and Ramesses (Tim Bagshaw and Mark Greening) to form a new doom metal band.

The band made its existence known in August 2015, and released its eponymous debut album on 16 October 2015 to the label Rise Above Records.

In January 2016, due to a disagreement with Dorrian, Greening was dismissed, and replaced by Alex Thomas (ex-Bolt Thrower). The former bass player of Cathedral and Firebird, Leo Smee, is also part of the band. Because of the parallel activities of its members, the band gives little concerts. In 2016, however, they play at Roadburn Festival, Hellfest, and Copenhell and are also scheduled at Tuska Open Air and Loud Park Festival. On 22 September 2017 the band released their second album Love from With the Dead.

== Members ==
Current members

- Lee Dorian – vocals (2014–present)
- Tim Bagshaw – guitars (2014–present), bass (2014–2016)
- Leo Smee – bass (2016–present)
- Alex Thomas – drums (2016–present)

Past members

- Mark Greening – drums, percussion (2014–2016)

== With the Dead ==
=== With the Dead ===
With the Dead

Studio album by With the Dead
- Released: 16 October 2015
- Recorded: March–July 2015
- Studio: Orgone, London
- Genre: Doom metal; stoner metal
- Length: 41:57
- Label: Rise Above

With the Dead chronology
''With the Dead'' (2015)	Love from With the Dead (2017)

With the Dead is the debut studio album by the English doom metal supergroup With the Dead, released on 16 October 2015.

All music is composed by Tim Bagshaw.

No.	Title	Length
1.	"Crown of Burning Stars"	6:21
2.	"The Cross"	6:46
3.	"Nephthys"	6:39
4.	"Living with the Dead"	7:50
5.	"I Am Your Virus"	5:40
6.	"Screams from My Own Grave"	8:41
Total length:		41:57

=== Japanese bonus track ===
No.	Title	Length
7.	"Celestial Suicide"	5:06
Total length:		47:03

== Love from With the Dead ==
=== Love from With the Dead ===
Love from With the Dead

Studio album by With the Dead
- Released: 22 September 2017
- Recorded: January 2016–2017
- Studio: Orgone, London
- Genre: Doom metal; stoner metal
- Length: 65:51
- Label: Rise Above

With the Dead chronology
With the Dead (2015)	''Love from With the Dead'' (2017)

Love from With the Dead is the second studio album by the English doom metal supergroup With the Dead, released on 22 September 2017. At 65:51, It is their longest studio album and includes their longest song, the 17-minute "CV1".

All music is composed by Tim Bagshaw and Lee Dorrian except "CV1" by Bagshaw, Dorrian and Russell Haswell of Cov.

No.	Title	Music	Length
1.	"Isolation"		7:42
2.	"Egyptian Tomb"		8:16
3.	"Reincarnation of Yesterday"		6:25
4.	"Cocaine Phantoms"		8:51
5.	"Watching the Ward Go By"		10:14
6.	"Anemia"		6:39
7.	"CV1"	Bagshaw, Dorrian, Russell Haswell	17:35
Total length:			65:51

== Vessel of Solitude ==
=== "Vessel of Solitude" ===
"Vessel of Solitude"

Single by With the Dead
- Released: 30 May 2017
- Studio: Orgone, London
- Genre: Heavy metal; stoner metal
- Length: 2:32
- Label: Decibel

"Vessel of Solitude" is the first single from the doom metal supergroup With the Dead that was previously unreleased and recorded during the Love from With the Dead sessions. At 2:32, is their shortest song ever recorded and is mainly oriented towards a more faster, heavy metal sound.

=== Single-sided ===
No.	Title	Length
1.	"Vessel of Solitude"	2:32

== Anemia ==
=== "Anemia" ===
"Anemia"

Single by With the Dead

from the album Love from With the Dead
- Released: 12 September 2017
- Studio: Orgone, London
- Genre: Doom metal; stoner metal
- Length: 6:39
- Label: Rise Above

"Anemia" is the second single from the supergroup With the Dead, from their second album Love from With the Dead.

=== Single-sided ===
No.	Title	Length
1.	"Anemia"	6:39
