= In Memorium =

EP by Cathedral
- Released: 7 October 1990
- Recorded: 1990
- Studio: Rhythm Studios
- Genre: Doom metal
- Length: 29:16
- Label: Rise Above
- Producer: Cathedral

Cathedral chronology
In Memorium (1990)	Forest of Equilibrium (1991)

In Memorium is a demo EP by British doom metal band Cathedral, released in 1990 through Rise Above. It was re-released in 1994 and was later re-released again in 1999 as In Memoriam, with additional live tracks from the 1991 the Netherlands and Belgium tours.

== Track listing ==
No.	Title	Length
1.	"Mourning of a New Day"	8:00
2.	"All Your Sins" (Pentagram cover)	5:54
3.	"Ebony Tears"	8:20
4.	"March"	7:02

== Personnel ==
- Lee Dorrian – vocals
- Garry Jennings – guitars
- Adam Lehan – guitar
- Mark (Griff) Griffiths – bass
- Ben Mochrie – drums

== Reception ==
Professional ratings
Review scores
Source	Rating
AllMusic	3/5 stars

The EP received a score of three out of five from AllMusic, with Alex Henderson finding it to be "not for casual listener". He stated that the EP was "assembled with the diehard fan in mind".
