= The Last Spire =

2013 studio album by Cathedral

Studio album by Cathedral
- Released: 29 April 2013 (Rise Above); 30 April 2013 (Metal Blade)
- Recorded: 2011–2012
- Genre: Doom metal
- Length: 58:19
- Label: Rise Above, Metal Blade
- Producer: Jaime Gomez Arellano

Cathedral chronology
The Guessing Game (2010)	The Last Spire (2013)

The Last Spire is the tenth and final studio album by British doom metal band Cathedral. Intended by the band as their farewell album, it was released in April 2013 through Rise Above Records and Metal Blade Records.

The album was praised for returning the band to its doom roots, with Nick Green of Decibel Magazine observing that "few bands get to write their own epitaphs in such vivid, exacting terms".

== Background ==
Cathedral announced on 6 February 2011, that they would release one final album and then disband. This announcement occurred well prior to the recording of The Last Spire. Lee Dorrian described the band's planned retirement as a "funeral" for the band, which was a "long and gratifying process". For Dorrian, the announcement enabled the band to record the album without pressure, "as it meant that we no longer had anything to prove and could make this album purely on our own terms".

Building upon the "funeral" metaphor, Dorrian later stated that the band's decision to plan for its own demise ultimately

hasn't made the end as painful as it would have been if we...finished without doing an album we [were] happy with, or we had a massive fight and the band ended for no apparent reason other than that; I think it would have been harder to deal with. But the fact that we've let it evolve into this situation where it is almost like giving ourselves a funeral, I think it's made it a bit easier to bear.

The Last Spire returns to a slower, doom-oriented sound akin to the band's debut, Forest of Equilibrium. Dorrian explained that the return to Cathedral's roots for its final album was not only intentional, but long anticipated:

This [The Last Spire] is the album I've been waiting to do since the first one, it almost feels like we made our second album last in some respects. We actually recorded a lot more material but decided to sacrifice many of the tracks to make the overall album feel more complete in its nihilism. I don't like happy endings, I never have.

According to Dorrian, Cathedral's decision to omit those tracks which did not fit with the goal of creating an "unhappy ending" resulted in "six or seven songs" which were cut because they "all strayed in different directions, and I wanted this [album] to be a lot more focused than the albums we'd done in recent times". Several of the songs have already appeared, including: "Vengeance of the Blind Dead" on a Decibel Magazine flexi-disc (an alternate version of the same song appears as a bonus track on the Japanese version of The Last Spire); a track with a "shuffle beat" titled "Evil Wizard", which will appear on a forthcoming Rise Above Records compilation to be released by Record Collector magazine; one unfinished "very epic" song that is thirty minutes in length which the band may finish and release as a 12" record; and four "groovy" songs closer to the band's more recent recordings.

Ultimately, Dorrian acknowledged his comfort with letting The Last Spire stand as Cathedral's legacy.

=== Recording ===
The album was recorded intermittently over several months. Dorrian said that, while in the studio, the recording went quickly; however, the band stretched out the time between recording days to give "us time to let the songs sit for a bit, and know exactly where to go with them".

=== Artwork ===
The interior of the album sleeve features artwork by long-time Cathedral artist Dave Patchett. Dorrian, describing the art as "climactic", notes that "it's not like a usual epic Dave Patchett piece where he does the full spread; it's just one section of the artwork now. It's basically thank you and goodbye, fuck you God or whatever. It's just a scene inside The Last Spire I suppose; almost like a nativity scene gone wrong."

=== Title ===
While there is no song on The Last Spire matching the album title, a previously unreleased instrumental track titled "The Last Spire" appears on Cathedral's 2011 live album, Anniversary. Dorrian described his decision to include the track on Anniversary as

my initial idea for the album...We didn't really have many songs written back then; we had just started thinking about the next album...I already knew that's what the title was going to be for the last album. I thought it would be good to give people some indication of how it would start, just leave a bit of a teaser I suppose...even though when we recorded the Anniversary record, we hadn't announced or decided it was going to be the last ever tour. It was just something I had in my head 'cause I wanted this last album to be the heaviest we could make it really, without being stupid you know. I wanted to make sure everyone else in the band knew that.

== Reception ==
Professional ratings
Aggregate scores
Source	Rating
Metacritic	66/100
Review scores
Source	Rating
About.com	3.5/5 stars
Decibel Magazine	8/10
Exclaim!	9/10
Jukebox:Metal	4/5 stars
Metalblast	4.5/5 stars
Metal Hammer	9/10
Pitchfork	7.5/10
Popmatters	6/10
Thisisnotascene.com	9/10
Scratch the Surface	9.2/10

The album has received "generally favorable reviews" according to Metacritic. Most reviews focus on the return to a doom-oriented sound and a reduction in the "quirky touches" in evidence on Cathedral albums including The Ethereal Mirror and, most recently, The Guessing Game. Chris Dick, writing for Decibel Magazine, stated that "Cathedral have reined in the purple puffy dragons and their Canterbury scene origins for a honed and toned (almost) mid-tempo thrust". Chris Ward described the album as bringing Cathedral "full circle", and serving as a bookend to the band's debut; however, he also heard "enough of the flavours the band sprinkled into all their albums in between to give it the feel of a eulogy of the band's output." Dean Brown, describing The Last Spire as a "true doom record", also credited the band with a "masterful understanding of dynamics" that integrated Cathedral's "signature curveballs". Grayson Currin wrote for Pitchfork that The Last Spire "does not feel like a microwaved visitation with the past or some self-obsessed tribute. Rather, these pieces sound like the work of a band hoping to fortify their legacy at the end of their career rather than simply prolong it". Natalie Zed, while criticising the middle of the album as "unwieldy", praised the band for incorporating "their musical demise into their very aesthetic". Popmatters' Frank Lopez departed from most critics with his argument that The Last Spire lacked a "pronounced tone of finality" suitable for Cathedral's farewell, wishing instead that the band would have "exploit[ed] their own morose theme a bit more and truly give the piece a sense of final departure".

== Track listing ==
All songs by Lee Dorrian and Garry Jennings.

1. "Entrance to Hell" – 3:07
2. "Pallbearer" – 11:38
3. "Cathedral of the Damned" – 5:48
4. "Tower of Silence" – 6:53
5. "Infestation of Grey Death" – 9:01
6. "An Observation" – 10:19
7. "The Last Laugh" – 0:38
8. "This Body, Thy Tomb" – 8:46

=== Japanese edition bonus track ===
1. "Tombs of the Blind Dead" – 5:18

== Credits ==
=== Band ===
- Lee Dorrian – vocals
- Garry Jennings – guitars
- Brian Dixon – drums
- Scott Carlson – bass

=== Guest musicians ===
- David Moore – Hammond organ, Moog synthesizer, Mellotron
- Chris Reifert – guest vocals on "Cathedral of the Damned"
- Rosalie Cunningham – backing vocals

=== Production and art ===
- Jaime Gomez Arellano – producer, mixing, engineering, mastering
- Lee Dorrian – producer
- Gaz Jennings – producer
- Ester Segarra – photography
- Arik Roper – artwork
- Dave Patchett – artwork
- Donato Panaccio – engineering (assistant)
- Chris Chantler – liner notes

== Charts ==
Chart (2013)	Peak position
US Heatseekers Albums (Billboard)	24
