= Lucifer (multinational band) =

Heavy metal band

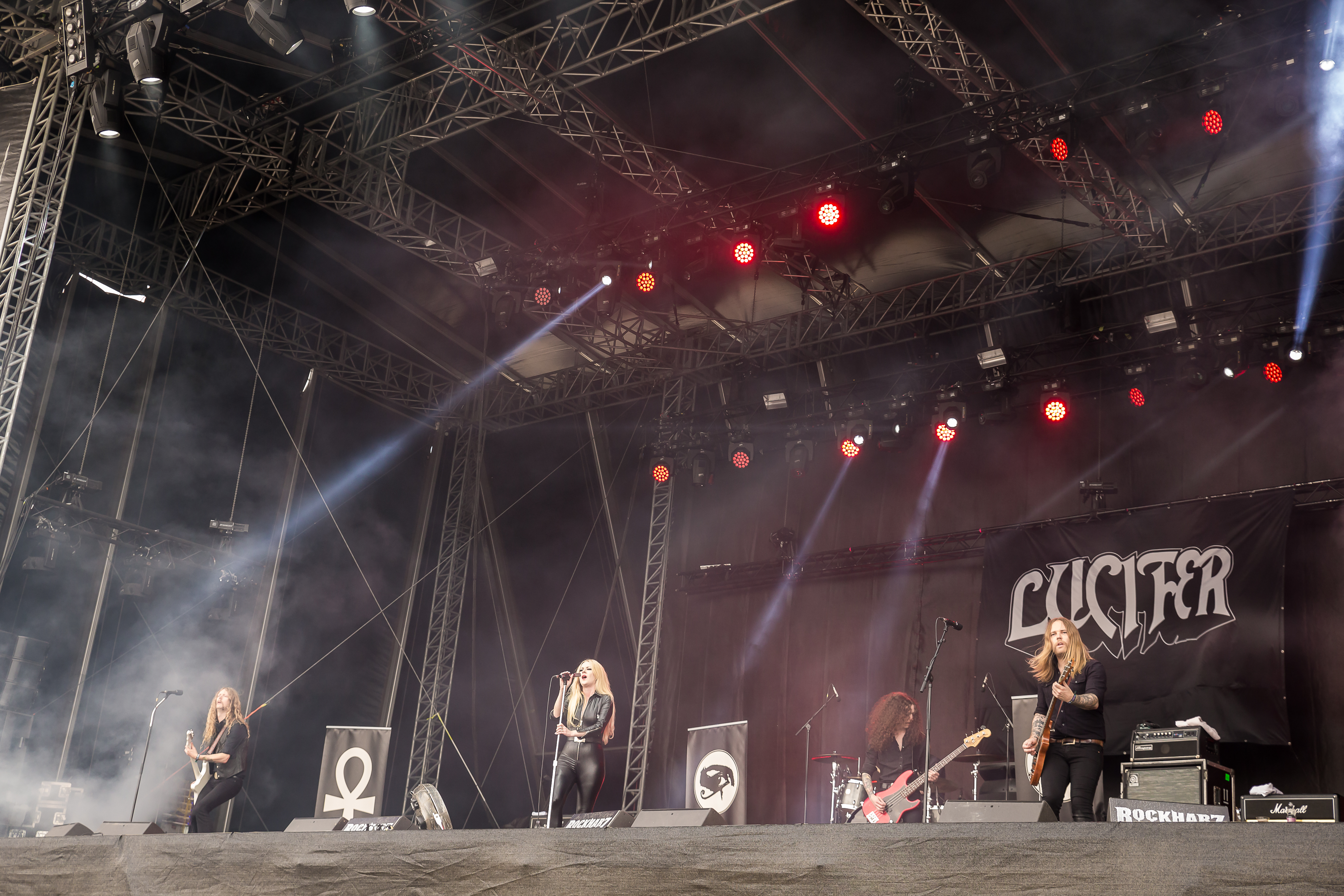
- Lucifer performing at Rockharz Open Air 2022

Background information
- Origin: Berlin, Germany
- Genres: Heavy metal, hard rock, doom metal, occult rock
- Years active: 2014–present
- Labels: Rise Above, Century Media, Nuclear Blast
- Members: Johanna Platow; Kevin Kuhn; Coralie Baier; Rosalie Cunningham; Claudia González Díaz
- Past members: Neta Shimoni; Dino Gollnick; Andy Prestidge; Gaz Jennings; Robin Tidebrink; Alexander Mayr; Nicke Andersson; Martin Nordin; Linus Björklund; Harald Göthblad

Lucifer is a heavy metal band formed in Berlin in 2014 by German vocalist Johanna Platow. (Note: Platow was previously known as Johanna Sadonis and Johanna Platow Andersson.) Following several member changes, Platow remains the only constant member. Currently based out of Stockholm, the band has released five studio albums.

== History ==
Although The Oath released their self-titled debut album in 2014 via Rise Above Records to much critical acclaim, the duo of singer Johanna Sadonis and guitarist Linnéa Olsson broke up that same year. Having had big plans for The Oath, Sadonis was devastated but decided to utilize the energy she had and quickly formed Lucifer to continue making music. She said that it "was clear" Andy Prestidge, former drummer for The Oath and Angel Witch, and bassist Dino Gollnick, who was about to play with The Oath before its demise, were going to be a part of the new project. When Sadonis told Rise Above founder Lee Dorrian that she was looking for a guitar player, Dorrian recommended his bandmate from the recently disbanded Cathedral, Gaz Jennings. Jennings quickly agreed and he and Sadonis began writing songs.

Because of Jennings' work with his band Death Penalty, it was agreed that he would not play live with Lucifer or appear in promotional photos. The single "Anubis" was released on 7 April 2015 on Rise Above Records. With a spot on the bill at the April 2015 Roadburn Festival in the Netherlands approaching, Sadonis quickly booked four smaller gigs in Germany to warm up. However, after being unable to find a guitar player for their first gigs, Jennings stepped in and with a big American tour booked later, his position as live guitarist continued. The band's first album, Lucifer I, was released on 16 June and the North American tour took place from 30 July to 23 August.

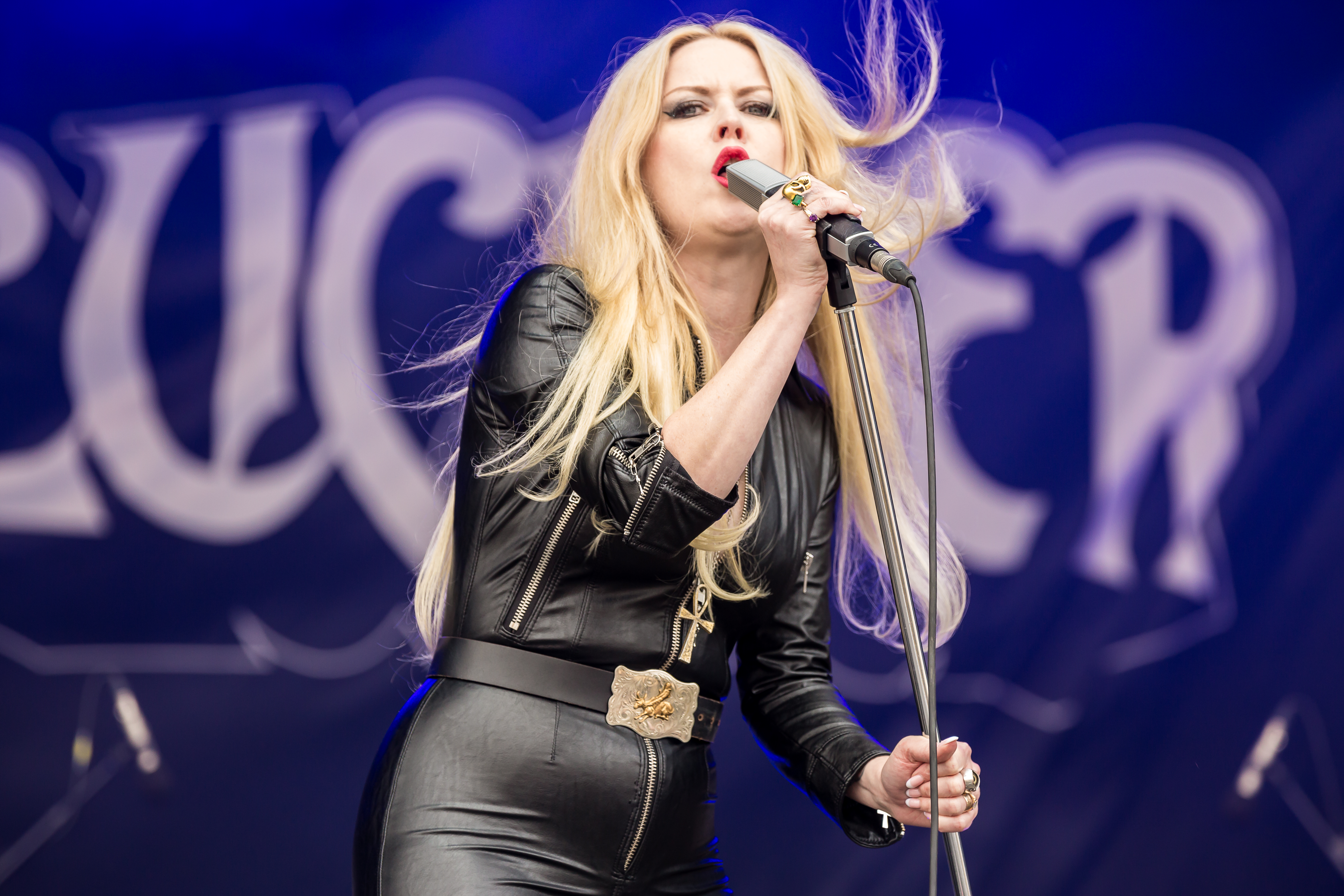
Frontwoman Johanna Sadonis has been the only constant member of Lucifer.

In March 2017 it was announced that Jennings and Prestidge had amicably left the band. Sadonis later revealed that Jennings left in November 2016, after their European tour. On the same day Jennings told Sadonis he was leaving, she met with Swedish multi-instrumentalist Nicke Andersson, who had been asking to write songs with her for some time. With a new songwriting partner and eager to record, Lucifer recorded their second album in Andersson's home studio without a complete band, only the addition of guitarist Robin Tidebrink.

Now based out of Stockholm and signed to Century Media Records, the single "Faux Pharaoh" was released in December 2017. A second single "California Son" followed on 4 May 2018. Before Lucifer II's 6 July release, guitarist Martin Nordin of the band Dead Lord and Austrian bassist Alexander Mayr were recruited as full members. In October Lucifer began a European tour that included performing live on the TV show Rockpalast. They also took part in Kiss Kruise VIII, a six-day American music cruise from 31 October to 5 November.

Lucifer toured North America throughout March 2019, performing one concert every day for 14 days straight, before supporting The Hellacopters at four European concerts in May. Throughout August they returned to the US for the second part of their North American tour. In October, Lucifer announced that Mayr would be leaving the band due to a medical issue. Harald Göthblad joined as bassist towards the end of December.

The band's third album, Lucifer III, was released on 20 March 2020 and was nominated for Best Hard Rock/Metal at the 2021 Grammis awards. On their own record label, Riding Reaper Records, Lucifer released a split vinyl single with Kadavar on 19 March 2021, to which they contributed a cover of "Pull Away/So Many Times" by Dust. They released another cover on 4 June; "Gone with the Wind Is My Love" featuring Elin Larsson of Blues Pills, originally by Rita and the Tiaras. Lucifer's fourth album, Lucifer IV, was released on 29 October 2021. It was nominated for Best Hard Rock/Metal at the 2022 Grammis awards and was cited on Metal Injection, Wikimetal and Collectors Room on their lists of the top metal albums of 2021.

In July 2022, Lucifer announced that they had signed to Nuclear Blast and were working on their fifth studio album. That album, Lucifer V, was released on 26 January 2024.

In May 2025, Platow announced new shows for Lucifer and a new lineup consisting of herself, guitarists Rosalie Cunningham and Coralie Baier, bassist Claudia González Díaz and drummer Kevin Kuhn.

== Music and style ==
Lucifer's influences include Black Sabbath, Deep Purple, Blue Öyster Cult, Lucifer's Friend, Steppenwolf, 70s Heart and Fleetwood Mac. When the group started, Jennings would write guitar riffs based on Sadonis' ideas and they would arrange songs together. Sadonis would then write the lyrics and vocal melodies. She often uses occult imagery intertwined with personal stories. For example, the song "Anubis", refers to the god of the same name in the Egyptian Book of the Dead, but he also stands as a metaphor for someone she knows. A self-admitted spiritual person, Sadonis explained "the music is very laden with spirituality and magic is like a central topic in the music, whether it being in the lyrics or how I present everything, the whole visual stuff but also numbers." For example, the singer has an affinity with the number seven, thus the band name Lucifer has seven letters and the all-seeing eye on their first album has seven beams shining down. Sadonis said that she felt the first Lucifer album was aimed more at a particular crowd, the "doom and underground metal people," and wanted their second to attract a wider audience. She explained that the first album became much heavier when Jennings joined and described the sophomore effort as more in line with what her original vision for the band was.

Lucifer's style musically and physically is retro, influenced by the 1960s and 1970s. Sadonis and Andersson both feel the "slick and polished" sound of modern recording techniques is inferior to the music from those decades. Speaking of the first album, Sadonis said it was recorded live with analogue equipment, so "you hear the little flaws. It's not over-produced because that would take the life out of it." Sadonis is particular about the visuals, saying "I like the presentation of the band and I think it's part of the ritual to kind of bring across the message of the music. It's meant for all senses, for your brain, for your ears, for your eyes, everything."

== Band members ==
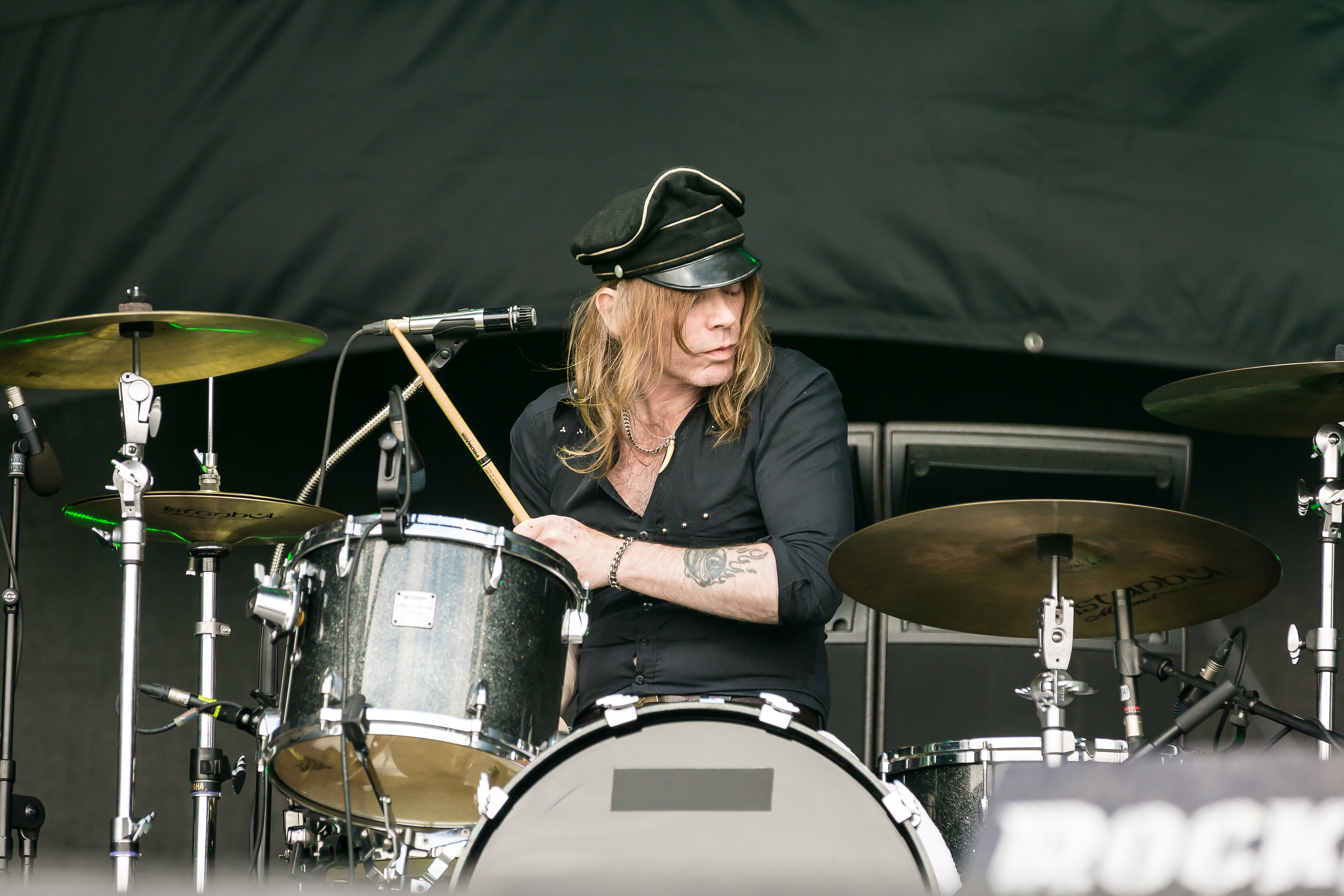
Multi-instrumentalist Nicke Andersson joined Lucifer as drummer in 2017.

Current members

- Johanna Platow – vocals, keyboards (2014–present)
- Kevin Kuhn – drums (2025–present)
- Coralie Baier – guitar (2025–present)
- Rosalie Cunningham – guitar (2025–present)
- Claudia González Díaz – bass (2025–present)

Former members

- Neta Shimoni – guitar (2014)
- Dino Gollnick – bass (2014–2015)
- Andy Prestidge – drums, keyboards (2014–2017)
- Gaz Jennings – guitar (2014–2017)
- Robin Tidebrink – guitar (2017–2018)
- Alexander Mayr – bass (2018–2019)
- Nicke Andersson – drums, percussion, guitar, bass, keyboards, backing vocals (2017–2025)
- Martin Nordin – guitar (2018–2025)
- Linus Björklund – guitar (2018–2025)
- Harald Göthblad – bass (2019–2025)

Timeline

== Discography ==
=== Albums ===
Year	Album details	GER	SWE	SWI	BEL (WA)	SPA	UK Rock
2015	Lucifer I: Released: 16 June 2015; Label: Rise Above	—	—	—	—	—	—
2018	Lucifer II: Released: 6 July 2018; Label: Century Media	40	12	68	188	—	18
2020	Lucifer III: Released: 20 March 2020; Label: Century Media	17	10	—	—	53	—
2021	Lucifer IV: Released: 29 October 2021; Label: Century Media	71	33	—	—	—	27
2024	Lucifer V: Released: 26 January 2024; Label: Nuclear Blast	32	38	77	—	—	—

=== Singles ===
Year	Title	GER	SWE
2015	"Anubis": Released: 7 April 2015	—	—
2015	"Izrael": Released: 18 May 2015	—	—
2017	"Faux Pharaoh": Released: December 2017	—	—
2018	"California Son": Released: 4 May 2018	—	—
2018	"Evening Wind": Released: 28 September 2018	—	—
2020	"Ghosts": Released: 24 January 2020	—	—
2020	"Midnight Phantom": Released: 21 February 2020	—	—
2020	"Dirt in the Ground": Released: 28 August 2020	—	—
2021	"Pull Away/So Many Times": Released: 19 March 2021	—	—
2021	"Gone with the Wind Is My Love" feat. Elin Larsson: Released: 4 June 2021	—	—
2021	"Wild Hearses": Released: 29 July 2021	—	—
