= Acid Reign =

British thrash metal band

- Origin: Harrogate, Yorkshire, England
- Genres: Thrash metal, crossover thrash
- Years active: 1985–1991, 2015–present
- Label: Under One Flag
- Spinoffs: Cathedral, Workshed
- Members: Howard "H" Smith; Pete Dee; Matt Smith; Johnny Grimley; Darren Mcgillivray
- Past members: Mark Ramsey Wharton; Garry Jennings; Ian Gangwer; Kevin Papworth; Adam Lehan; Ian MacDonald; Paul Chanter; Dean "Cooky" Cook; Marc Jackson

Acid Reign are an English thrash metal band from Harrogate, Yorkshire. Originally active from 1985 to 1991, they rebooted in 2015 with just Howard "H" Smith remaining from the original line-up. Along with Onslaught, Sabbat and Xentrix, Acid Reign are considered to be one of the "Big Four" of British thrash metal. They have released four studio albums to date: The Fear (1989), Obnoxious (1990), The Age of Entitlement (2019) and Daze of the Week (2026).

== History ==
=== Initial career (1985–1991) ===
Acid Reign were formed by drummer and keyboardist Mark Ramsey Wharton, bassist Ian Gangwer (originally Peter Warriner), singer Howard "H" Smith, and future Cathedral member, guitarist Gary "Gaz" Jennings.

In 1987, the band released the Moshkinstein demo. On the strength of this recording, they were picked up by British thrash metal label Under One Flag (a subsidiary of Music for Nations) in 1988 who released the Moshkinstein EP. Following this release, Jennings was replaced by another future Cathedral member, Adam Lehan (formerly of Lord Crucifier), and the band gained support slots opening for such acts as Flotsam and Jetsam and Death Angel. Acid Reign struck up a friendship with label mates Nuclear Assault and Exodus, and toured the UK and Europe as support to the Survive and Fabulous Disaster tours.

The band released their debut album, The Fear, in 1989. In support of the album, Acid Reign toured with Nuclear Assault again in 1989 across Europe with Dark Angel and Candlemass, with bassist Ian "Mac" MacDonald replacing Gangwer. Their second album, Obnoxious, arrived in 1990 to generally poor reviews.

=== Post-split (1991–2014) ===
Acid Reign broke up in 1991 after parting ways with Music for Nations. They played their final show at the London Marquee Club.

In January 2014, H started the world's only comedy/heavy metal podcast called "Talking Bollocks" for the British metal website All About the Rock.

On 30 November 2014, Acid Reign frontman H told All About the Rock:

I tried to put the old line up back together but Adam and Ramsey were unable to do it for differing reasons. That news came this time last year and it looked like that was that as Kev isn't able to commit to anything as he's constantly on the road, although he has an open invitation to join us when he's not, that's a given. Then, in the summer, I started toying with the idea of a new line up and it came together quite quickly. We're taking it slowly, learning the old stuff and playing with new ideas too. It's not a reformation it's a reboot. Even if it was the old line up it would be different, it's been 24 years! The main thing is that the goodwill toward Acid Reign has never been stronger, everywhere I go people are saying we should come back and eventually I actually fucking listened! We'll make an "official" announcement when we're ready and have plans but for now it is just have a merry Xmas and an Obnoxious New Year.

=== Reboot (2015–present) ===
On 5 May 2015, Acid Reign announced on their Facebook page that they had reformed. Frontman Howard "H" Smith, who is the only original member of Acid Reign involved in the reboot, commented, "Finally the rebooted line up is complete, it's taken nearly two years but I can honestly say it's been worth the wait. Typically we're doing things differently to everyone else as where they reformed (and believe me we tried) we are now rebooting. Everyone in the band has Acid Reign in their DNA, some of the guys knew the band back in the day and some didn't but everyone is on the same page and we can't wait to get out there and show the world how much it has been missing us." Two months later, Acid Reign released their first song in 25 years, "Plan of the Damned", via streaming platforms.

On 27 September 2019 the band released their first full-length studio album in 29 years, engineered, produced and mixed by Jayce Lewis at Northstone Studios, the long-awaited album titled The Age of Entitlement was released via Dissonance Productions to worldwide critical and fan acclaim.

In May 2021, Acid Reign confirmed on their Facebook page that original bassist Ian Gangwer had died. No cause of death was given at the time. On 25 March 2022, it was announced via the band's Facebook page that they had parted company with guitarist Paul Chanter. Chanter was replaced by Matt Smith. Drummer Marc Jackson and guitarist Dean "Cooky" Cook both left Acid Reign in December 2024. They were replaced by Johnny Grimley (ex-Shrapnel) and Darren Mcgillivray (ex-Wrath of Man).

Acid Reign began working on new material for their fourth full-length studio album as early as 2021. In January 2026, the band revealed Daze of the Week as the title of the album and it was released on 15 May.

== Band members ==
=== Current members ===
- Howard "H" Smith – vocals (1985–1991, 2014–present)
- Pete Dee – bass (2015–present)
- Matt Smith – guitar (2022–present)
- Darren Mcgillivray – guitar (2025–present)
- Johnny Grimley – drums (2025–present)

=== Former members ===
- Mark Ramsey Wharton – drums, keyboards (1985–1991)
- Garry Jennings – guitar (1985–1988)
- Ian Gangwer – bass (1985–1989; died 2021)
- Kevin "Kev" Papworth – guitar (1987–1991)
- Adam Lehan – guitar (1989–1990)
- Ian "Mac" MacDonald – bass (1989–1991)
- Paul Chanter – guitar (2015–2022)
- Dean "Cooky" Cook – guitar (2015–2024)
- Marc Jackson – drums (2014–2024)

Timeline

== Discography ==
=== Studio albums ===
- The Fear (1989) (UK Indie No. 10)
- Obnoxious (1990)
- The Age of Entitlement (2019)
- Daze of the Week (2026)

=== Other releases ===
- The Worst of Acid Reign (compilation, 1991)
- The Apple Core Archives (box set, 2014)

=== EPs ===
- Moshkinstein (1988)
- Humanoia (1989)

=== Singles ===
- "Hanging on the Telephone" (1989)
- "Plan of the Damned" (2015)
- "The Man Who Became Himself" (2017)
- "The New Low" (2019)
- "Blood Makes Noise" (2019)
