= Rotting Civilisation =

Studio album by Septic Tank
- Released: 13 April 2018
- Genre: Hardcore punk; crust punk; thrashcore
- Length: 39:55
- Label: Rise Above Records
- Producer: Jaime "Gomez" Arellano

Septic Tank chronology
Septic Tank (2013)	Rotting Civilisation (2018)

Rotting Civilisation is the debut album by British punk rock band Septic Tank. The album was released on 13 April 2018 through Rise Above Records. In an interview with Blabbermouth, Dorrian said:

"We talked about doing it again many times, but it took us 20 years to make a record. Black Sabbath were doing their so-called last-ever show in Birmingham and Scott wanted to come over for that, so I suggested we got together and did an album while he was here. He stayed over for five days. 14 of the songs were already roughly written but not rehearsed, another eight or so came up on the spot and were recorded straight away, and that was it. It took us over 20 years but I'm really happy we did it."

Professional ratings
Review scores
Source	Rating
Metal Forces	8/10 stars
Metal Hammer	3.5/5 stars

== Personnel ==
Septic Tank

Credits adapted from Metal Forces:

- Lee Dorrian – vocals
- Garry Jennings – guitars
- Scott Carlson – bass
- Jaime Gómez Arellano – drums, mastering, mixing

Additional personnel

- Stewart Easton - Artwork
- Mark Griffiths - Graphic design, text

== Track listing ==
Track listing adapted from Metal Hammer:

No.	Title	Length
1.	"Septic Tank"	1:43
2.	"Who"	1:29
3.	"Victimised"	2:10
4.	"Social Media Whore"	2:18
5.	"Devide and Conk Out"	2:37
6.	"Treasurers Of Disease"	2:53
7.	"Fucked"	0:57
8.	"Whitewash"	1:03
9.	"Death Vase"	4:08
10.	"You Want Some"	2:53
11.	"Digging Your Own Grave"	3:01
12.	"Danger Signs"	2:21
13.	"Walking Asylum"	2:34
14.	"Lost Humanity"	1:05
15.	"Never Never Land"	2:32
16.	"Self-Obsessed"	1:07
17.	"Living Death"	2:26
18.	"Rotten Empire"	2:50
