= Mike Bushell =

British sports presenter (born 1965)

- Born: 11 December 1965 (age 60); Hitchin, Hertfordshire, England
- Education: Granby High School; King Alfred's College
- Occupation: Sports presenter
- Years active: 1990–present
- Employer: BBC
- Notable work: BBC Breakfast
- Spouses: Kim Payne (m. 1993; div. 2009) Emily Bond (m. 2019; sep. 2024)
- Children: 3

Mike Bushell (born 11 December 1965) is an English sports presenter for the BBC. He presents sport on BBC Breakfast. Bushell has participated in many different sports on his Saturday morning slot on BBC One and on the BBC News Channel.

In 2019, he was a contestant in series 17 of the television dance show Strictly Come Dancing. He was the seventh contestant to be eliminated alongside his professional dance partner Katya Jones.

== Early life, education and career ==
Bushell was born in Hitchin, Hertfordshire, he spent his teenage years in Yorkshire after growing up in northern Hertfordshire, attending school in Stevenage and Ashwell. He played chess for Hertfordshire and ran in the county cross country team.

In 1977, his family moved to Pannal, near Harrogate and he went to secondary school at Granby High School. He went on to join the National Youth Theatre.

In 1982, he took part in the game show It's a Knockout, representing Winchester in two games of a domestic heat, but his team finished bottom of three.

In 1990, after stints on the Derby Evening Telegraph and the Windsor and Slough Observer, he gained his first broadcasting job at BBC Radio Solent as a trainee reporter. He then moved to television, as a news, sport and entertainment reporter–presenter for BBC South Today before joining the BBC News channel, and later BBC Breakfast.

== Career ==
Bushell presents the sport on BBC Breakfast on Fridays at the weekends, and sometimes on other weekdays. Bushell tries many different sports on his Saturday morning slot, on BBC One, in which he tries to "inspire people off the sofa", to "be more active" and "try a new activity".

He has his own web page, Bushell's Best, on the pages of the BBC News website. For Sport Relief in 2012, he set the world record for travelling across water in a large inflatable ball. In June 2013, his first book, Bushell's Best Bits, was published.

He has been with the BBC News channel since its launch in 1997, and appeared on Celebrity Mastermind on 28 December 2013.

On 11 April 2018, during a live broadcast at the 2018 Commonwealth Games in Gold Coast, Australia, Bushell accidentally fell into a swimming pool after not noticing a large drop from a step he was standing on while interviewing some of the English swimming team, including Adam Peaty. Owing to water damage, his microphone eventually stopped working and coverage had to revert to the studios.

In January 2018, Bushell participated in And They're Off! in aid of Sport Relief.

Bushell was a contestant on series 17 of Strictly Come Dancing and was paired with Katya Jones. They were the seventh couple to be eliminated from the competition after losing out in a dance-off.

== Personal life ==
Bushell has three daughters from his first marriage to Kim Payne; they divorced in 2009 after 16 years. He resides in Overton, Hampshire.

Bushell plays football and is a runner with the Hash House Harriers. He is a fan of Leeds United.
