= Garry Jennings =

English metal/punk musician

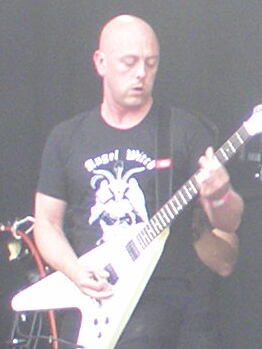
- Jennings in 2009

Background information
- Genres: Heavy metal; doom metal; thrash metal; hardcore punk
- Occupation: Musician
- Instruments: Guitar; keyboards; bass
- Years active: 1985–present
- Labels: Under One Flag; Rise Above; Metal Blade

Garry "Gaz" Jennings is an English musician best known for his work as the guitarist for doom metal band Cathedral. In addition, he has also worked as the guitarist of thrash metal band Acid Reign, punk rock band Septic Tank and heavy metal bands Lucifer and Death Penalty.

== Biography ==
Jennings formed Acid Reign in 1985, along with Howard "H" Smith, Kevin "Kev" Papworth, Ian Gangwer and Mark Ramsey Wharton, while attending Harrogate High School (then-called "Granby"). After recording their debut EP, Jennings departed from the band in 1988, being replaced by Adam Lehan. Then in 1989, Jennings was contacted by ex-Napalm Death vocalist Lee Dorian with the proposition of forming a band together, which would end up becoming Cathedral, and would also include then-Acid Reign guitarist Adam Lehan. In 1994, Jennings would briefly form a band called Septic Tank with Lee Dorrian, Repulsion vocalist and bassist Scott Carlson and Trouble drummer Barry Stern. Cathedral would announce their breakup shortly after the release of their 2013 album The Last Spire, leading to Jennings reforming Septic Tank, this time with Jaime "Gomez" Arellano, due to Barry Stern's death in 2005. In 2014, Jennings released the self-titled album for a band he formed in 2010 called "Death Penalty". Jennings would also form a band called Lucifer with Andy Prestidge of Angel Witch and Johanna Sadonis, formerly of the Oath; however, Jennings would later depart from the band, being replaced by ex-Entombed drummer Nicke Andersson.

== Discography ==
=== With Acid Reign ===
- Moshkinstein (1988)

=== With Cathedral ===
Studio albums

- Forest of Equilibrium (1991)
- The Ethereal Mirror (1993)
- The Carnival Bizarre (1995)
- Supernatural Birth Machine (1996)
- Caravan Beyond Redemption (1998)
- Endtyme (2001)
- The VIIth Coming (2002)
- The Garden of Unearthly Delights (2005)
- The Guessing Game (2010)
- The Last Spire (2013)

EPs

- In Memorium (1990)
- Statik Majik (1994)
- Cosmic Requiem (1994)

=== With Septic Tank ===
Studio albums

- Rotting Civilisation (2018)

EPs

- Septic Tank (2013)

=== With Death Penalty ===
- Death Penalty (2014)

=== With Lucifer ===
- Lucifer I (2015)
