= Statik Majik =

EP by Cathedral
- Released: March 1994
- Recorded: 16–23 August 1993
- Studio: Rhythm Studios
- Genre: Doom metal, stoner metal
- Length: 40:18
- Label: Earache
- Producer: Garry Jennings, Lee Dorrian, Paul Johnson

Cathedral chronology
The Ethereal Mirror (1993)	Statik Majik (1994)	Cosmic Requiem (1994)

Professional ratings
Review scores
Source	Rating
ninehertz	Favourable

Statik Majik is an EP by British doom metal band Cathedral, released in March 1994 through Earache. "Midnight Mountain" originally appeared on the band's second full-length album, The Ethereal Mirror. Tracks 2, 3 and 4 were also released the same year on the Cosmic Requiem EP. In 2009, Statik Majik was re-released together with 1992's Soul Sacrifice EP.

== Track listing ==
All tracks are written by Garry Jennings and Lee Dorrian, except where noted

No.	Title	Length
1.	"Midnight Mountain" (CD only)	4:55
2.	"Hypnos 164"	5:43
3.	"Cosmic Funeral"	7:00
4.	"The Voyage of the Homeless Sapien"	22:40

Japanese version
No.	Title	Lyrics	Music	Length
1.	"Midnight Mountain"			4:55
2.	"Hypnos 164"			5:43
3.	"Cosmic Funeral"			7:00
4.	"The Voyage of the Homeless Sapien"			22:40
5.	"Autumn Twilight"	Mark Griffiths	Jennings, Griffiths	5:49
6.	"Frozen Rapture"	Dorrian	Adam Lehan	6:07
7.	"Golden Blood (Flooding)"	Dorrian	Jennings	8:11
8.	"Grim Luxuria (Live in Japan)"	Lehan, Dorrian	Lehan, Dorrian	4:50
9.	"Sweet Leaf (Live in Japan)" (Black Sabbath cover)	Geezer Butler	Ozzy Osbourne, Tony Iommi, Butler, Bill Ward	5:41

1999 re-release
No.	Title	Lyrics	Music	Length
1.	"Soul Sacrifice"	Mark Griffiths	Jennings	4:35
2.	"Autumn Twilight"	Griffiths	Jennings, Griffiths	5:49
3.	"Frozen Rapture"	Dorrian	Adam Lehan	6:07
4.	"Golden Blood (Flooding)"	Dorrian	Jennings	8:11
5.	"Midnight Mountain"			4:55
6.	"Hypnos 164"			5:43
7.	"Cosmic Funeral"			7:00
8.	"The Voyage of the Homeless Sapien"			22:40

== Personnel ==
=== Cathedral ===
- Lee Dorrian – vocals, production, mixing, sleeve concept
- Garry Jennings – guitar, bass, production, mixing
- Mark Wharton – drums
- Adam Lehan – guitar

=== Additional musicians ===
- Russell Haswell – backing vocals

=== Technical personnel ===
- Paul Johnson – production, mixing
- Dave Patchett – front cover art
- Jason Tilley – photo
- Leilah Wendell – label art
- BOO – layout
