= Mark Wharton =

British drummer

Mark Ramsey Wharton
- Origin: Harrogate, North Yorkshire, England
- Genres: Heavy metal; thrash metal; doom metal
- Occupation: Drummer
- Years active: 1985–present

Mark Ramsey Wharton is a British drummer who has worked with the metal bands Acid Reign, Cathedral, Cronos, Asomvel and Workshed.

== Biography ==
Wharton formed Acid Reign in 1985, along with Kevin "Kev" Papworth, Ian Gangwer, Howard "H" Smith and Gaz Jennings, whom he had met at Granby High School in Harrogate Acid Reign eventually broke up in 1991 after the release of their 1990 album Obnoxious, leading to Wharton joining his ex-Acid Reign bandmates Gaz Jennings and Adam Lehan in Cathedral in 1992. Wharton then proceeded to form the band Asomvel with Jay-Jay Winter (whom he had played with in an early band, called "Lochenbar") and Lenny Robinson in 1993. At this time, Wharton would also join Venom vocalist Conrad Lant's eponymous band Cronos, however, by 1996 Wharton was no longer present in any of these projects.

== Discography ==
=== With Acid Reign ===
Studio albums

- The Fear (1989)
- Obnoxious (1990)

EPs

- Moshkinstein (1988)

=== With Cathedral ===
Studio albums

- The Ethereal Mirror (1993)

EPs

- Soul Sacrifice (1992)
- Statik Majik (1994)
- Cosmic Requiem (1994)

=== With Cronos ===
- Venom (1995)

=== With Workshed ===
- Workshed (2019)
