= Shrapnel (English band) =

British band

Shrapnel is an English metal band from Norwich. Starting out as a thrash metal band, Shrapnel switched to metalcore in the 2020s.

== History ==
Shrapnel was founded in 2009 by Chris Martin and Nathan Sadd. They both played guitar, recruiting Aaron Tucker as the vocalist, Adam Read on bass and Chris Williams on drums. Following self-released EPs, Shrapnel was signed to Candlelight Records and made their album debut in 2014 with The Virus Conspires. Played chiefly in the Bay Area thrash metal style, the album "elicited acclaim for its kinetic, no-nonsense thrash attack" according to Allmusic.

The following albums Raised on Decay (2017) and Palace for the Insane (2020) were in the same vein. After Aaron Tucker left in 2022, and was succeeded by Daniel Moran, the band also changed styles to metalcore on the 2024 album In Gravity.

== Discography ==
- No Saviours EP (2009)
- The Devastation to Come EP (2010)
- The Virus Conspires (2014)
- Raised on Decay (2017)
- Decade of Decimation EP (2019)
- Palace for the Insane (2020)
- In Gravity (2024)
