= The Garden of Unearthly Delights =

Studio album by Cathedral
- Released: 26 September 2005
- Recorded: May 2005
- Studio: New Rising Studios, Essex, England
- Genre: Stoner metal, doom metal
- Length: 70:53
- Label: Nuclear Blast
- Producer: Warren Riker

Cathedral chronology
The Serpent's Gold (2004)	The Garden of Unearthly Delights (2005)	The Guessing Game (2010)

Professional ratings
Review scores
Source	Rating
AllMusic	3/5 stars
The Collector's Guide to Heavy Metal	8/10
Decibel	8/10

The Garden of Unearthly Delights is the eighth full-length album by the British doom metal band Cathedral. It was released on 26 September 2005. The album title is inspired by the Hieronymous Bosch painting The Garden of Earthly Delights. The album was recorded at New Rising Studios and produced by Warren Riker.

The limited-edition digipak version of this album contains an apple-shaped Sniffle Disc CD that emits the smell of an apple when rubbed on the label side or heated during playback in a CD or CD-ROM player.

== Track listing ==
No.	Title	Length
1.	"Dearth AD 2005"	1:00
2.	"Tree of Life & Death"	4:36
3.	"North Berwick Witch Trials"	5:58
4.	"Upon Azrael's Wings"	5:38
5.	"Corpsecycle"	5:54
6.	"Fields of Zagara"	1:59
7.	"Oro the Manslayer"	7:29
8.	"Beneath a Funeral Sun"	5:20
9.	"The Garden": "I. Thorns of Creation"; "II. Trouble in the Garden; "III. Into the Valley of the Violent Orchids"; a) Cadaverous Butterfly; b) Blind Man's Gate; "IV. Flight of the Reaper"; a) Court of the Cosmic Judge; b) Tunnel of Death; "V. Alarm Bells in Paradise"; a) Morning of a Paused Dawn; b) Black Bubophyllum Sunrise; "VI. Exit the Valley of Violent Orchids"; a) Through the Concrete Meadows of Life; b) Chains of Morality; "VII. Back to the Garden"; "VIII. Pool of Sleeping Minds"; "IX. Endtyme"	26:57
10.	"Proga-Europa"	5:58

  - "Proga-Europa" begins with 5:01 of silence. The last 0:57 make up the hidden track.

== Personnel ==
- Lee Dorian – vocals, samples
- Garry Jennings – guitar, acoustic guitar, percussion
- Brian Dixon – drums, percussion
- Leo Smee – bass, mellotron, flute, synthesizers, auto harp
- Warren Riker – recording and producing
- Dave Patchett – cover art
- Lo Polidoro – female vocals
