= The VIIth Coming =

Studio album by Cathedral
- Released: 5 November 2002
- Recorded: July 2002
- Studio: The Chapel, Lincolnshire, England
- Genre: Doom metal, stoner metal
- Length: 53:27
- Label: Spitfire
- Producer: Kit Woolven, Cathedral

Cathedral chronology
Endtyme (2001)	The VIIth Coming (2002)	The Serpent's Gold (2004)

Professional ratings
Review scores
Source	Rating
AllMusic	4/5 stars
CMJ New Music Report	Mixed
Collector's Guide to Heavy Metal	8/10

The VIIth Coming is the seventh studio album by British doom metal band Cathedral, released on 5 November 2002 through Spitfire Records (the band's first release with the label).

== Track listing ==
No.	Title	Length
1.	"Phoenix Rising"	3:52
2.	"Resisting the Ghost"	2:37
3.	"Skullflower"	5:44
4.	"Aphrodite's Winter"	5:04
5.	"The Empty Mirror"	8:38
6.	"Nocturnal Fist"	3:20
7.	"Iconoclast"	5:19
8.	"Black Robed Avenger"	6:46
9.	"Congregation of Sorcerer's"	4:39
10.	"Halo of Fire"	7:21

Japanese edition bonus track
No.	Title	Length
11.	"Texting"	5:59

== Personnel ==
Cathedral

- Lee Dorrian – vocals
- Garry Jennings – guitars
- Leo Smee – bass
- Brian Dixon – drums

Additional musicians

- Munch – keyboard, mellotron
