= The Guessing Game =

Studio album by Cathedral
- Released: 26 March 2010
- Recorded: Late 2009 – 2010
- Genres: Stoner metal, doom metal
- Length: 84:41
- Label: Nuclear Blast
- Producer: Warren Riker

Cathedral chronology
The Garden of Unearthly Delights (2005)	The Guessing Game (2010)	The Last Spire (2013)

Professional ratings
Review scores
Source	Rating
About.com	2.5/5 stars
AllMusic	4.5/5 stars
The Guardian	4/5 stars
Invisible Oranges	favourable
Jukebox:Metal	5/5 stars
Popmatters	7/10
The Quietus	favourable
Rock Sound	9/10

The Guessing Game is the ninth studio album by British doom metal band Cathedral, released on 26 March 2010 through Nuclear Blast Records. The first double-album by the band, it was voted the eighth-best album of the year in the Metal Hammer magazine critics poll of 2010.

== Reception ==
Describing the album as Cathedral's "magnum opus", Phil Freeman wrote for AllMusic that The Guessing Game offered the "most psychedelic, progressive material in the band's entire catalog". Writing in The Guardian, Jamie Thomson praised the "fine balance between their monolithic guitar groove and a more heady blend of prog, folk, psychedelia and even the occasional burst of Bonzo Dog Band-style jazz whimsy...these sparkling sojourns to the outer fringes of 70s rock would cheer even the most jaded metaller. Doom has rarely sounded so joyous". Viewing The Guessing Game as embodying an "unprecedented level of indulgence", The Quietus's Noel Gardner suggested that it serves as "a landmark Cathedral release" and "an ideal starting point to ease a Cathedral ignoramus into the band's self-contained world". Noting the frequency with which the double-album format suffers from bloat, Invisible Oranges's Chris Rowella praised Cathedral for coming "damned...close" to perfecting the model. Describing The Guessing Game as Cathedral's "pinnacle of ... experimentation", Popmatters's Chris Colgan suggested that the album provides insight into Cathedral's diverse influences.

However, not all critics wrote favourably about the album. George Pacheco wrote for About.com that The Guessing Game is a "confounding conundrum of an album ... both forward-thinking and stagnant-sounding at the same time". Pacheco identified "an overwrought sense of daring" as a key concern, which left the album "fractured and flawed".

== Track listing ==
All songs written by Lee Dorrian and Garry Jennings, except where noted.

=== Disc one ===
1. "Immaculate Misconception" (Leo Smee) – 2:24
2. "Funeral of Dreams" – 8:28
3. "Painting in the Dark" – 6:18
4. "Death of an Anarchist" – 7:12
5. "The Guessing Game" (Jennings) – 3:08
6. "Edwige's Eyes" – 7:08
7. "Cats, Incense, Candles and Wine" – 6:01

=== Disc two ===
1. "One Dimensional People" (Smee) – 2:30
2. "The Casket Chasers" – 6:41
3. "La Noche del Buque Maldito (aka Ghost Ship of the Blind Dead)" (Dorrian, Jennings, Smee) – 5:46
4. "The Running Man" (Dorrian) – 8:46
5. "Requiem for the Voiceless" – 9:50
6. "Journey into Jade" – 10:36
- "Journey into Jade" ends at 6:32 and continues with silence until 9:32. At this point, begins an untitled hidden track: there is a voice recording of Cathedral artist Dave Patchett describing the theme of the artwork for The Guessing Game. At one point during this audio section, Lee Dorrian stifles a laugh in response to one of Dave's opinions about religion. There is music playing in the background.

== Credits ==
- Lee Dorrian – vocals, samples
- Garry Jennings – guitar, acoustic guitar, percussion
- Brian Dixon – drums, percussion
- Leo Smee – bass guitar, Mellotron, flute, synthesizers, autoharp
- Dave Patchett – cover art
- Warren Riker – production, engineering, mixing
- Maor Appelbaum – mastering
