= Supernatural Birth Machine =

Studio album by Cathedral
- Released: 12 November 1996
- Recorded: May–June 1996
- Studio: Parkgate Studio
- Genre: Stoner metal, doom metal
- Length: 57:57
- Label: Earache
- Producer: Kit Woolven

Cathedral chronology
The Carnival Bizarre (1995)	Supernatural Birth Machine (1996)	Caravan Beyond Redemption (1998)

Professional ratings
Review scores
Source	Rating
AllMusic	3/5 stars
Chronicles of Chaos	7/10
Collector's Guide to Heavy Metal	6/10
The Encyclopedia of Popular Music	3/5 stars

Supernatural Birth Machine is the fourth studio album by British doom metal band Cathedral, released on 12 November 1996 through Earache Records.

== Track listing ==
All tracks are written by Lee Dorrian and Garry Jennings, except where noted

No.	Title	Length
1.	"Cybertron 71/Eternal Countdown (Intro)"	1:18
2.	"Urko's Conquest"	4:02
3.	"Stained Glass Horizon"	5:29
4.	"Cyclops Revolution"	7:07
5.	"Birth Machine 2000" (Written by Dorrian, Jennings and Leo Smee)	8:59
6.	"Nightmare Castle"	6:31
7.	"Fireball Demon"	4:12
8.	"Phaser Quest" (Written by Dorrian, Jennings and Smee)	3:42
9.	"Suicide Asteroid"	4:13
10.	"Dragon Rider 13"	5:52
11.	"Magnetic Hole"	6:32

Japanese version bonus track
No.	Title	Length
12.	"Tuckers Ruck"	4:59

== Personnel ==
=== Cathedral ===
- Lee Dorrian – vocals
- Garry Jennings – guitar, mellotron (tracks 1 and 5), piano (track 6)
- Leo Smee – bass
- Brian Dixon – drums

=== Technical personnel ===
- Kit Woolven – production, engineering
- Doug Cook – assistant engineering
- Noel Summerville – mastering
- Antz White – art direction, design, digital image manipulation
- Dave Patchett – cover painting
- George Chin – band photographs
