= Adam Lehan =

British musician

- Also known as: Adam Srib, Jehan
- Origin: Batley, West Yorkshire, England
- Genres: Doom metal; stoner metal; thrash metal; folk
- Occupation: Musician
- Instruments: Guitar; vocals
- Years active: 1985–present
- Member of: Workshed
- Formerly of: Acid Reign; Cathedral

Adam Lehan is a British musician who has worked with doom metal bands Cathedral and Workshed, thrash metal bands Acid Reign, Deadline and Lord Crucifier and folk band Beneath the Oak.

== History ==
Some of Lehan's uncles were members of the Grumbleweeds, which led to him beginning to learn to play guitar at the age of fourteen, with his early influences including Brian May, Eric Clapton and Ritchie Blackmore. In 1987 he formed his first band, Deadline, who were heavily influenced by the sound of Venom and would generally play concerts in punk rock and crust punk circles, rather than metal. In 1987, while still in Deadline, he joined first-wave black metal band Lord Crucifier, after their relocation to Halifax, West Yorkshire from Italy, however Lehan was only a member for a few months. After his departure from both bands, in 1988 he joined Acid Reign. Lehan left Acid Reign in 1989 to form Cathedral with former Acid Reign member Garry Jennings, former Napalm Death vocalist Lee Dorrian, former Carcass roadie Mark Griffiths, as well as Andy Baker. In 2013, Lehan and former Acid Reign and Cathedral bandmate Mark Wharton formed the doom metal band Workshed. Workshed's debut self-titled album was released on 13 September 2019 through Rise Above Records.

== Discography ==
=== With Acid Reign ===
- The Fear (1989)
- Obnoxious (1990)

=== With Cathedral ===
- Forest of Equilibrium (1991)
- The Ethereal Mirror (1993)

=== With Workshed ===
- Workshed (2019)
