= Septic Tank (band) =

British punk rock band

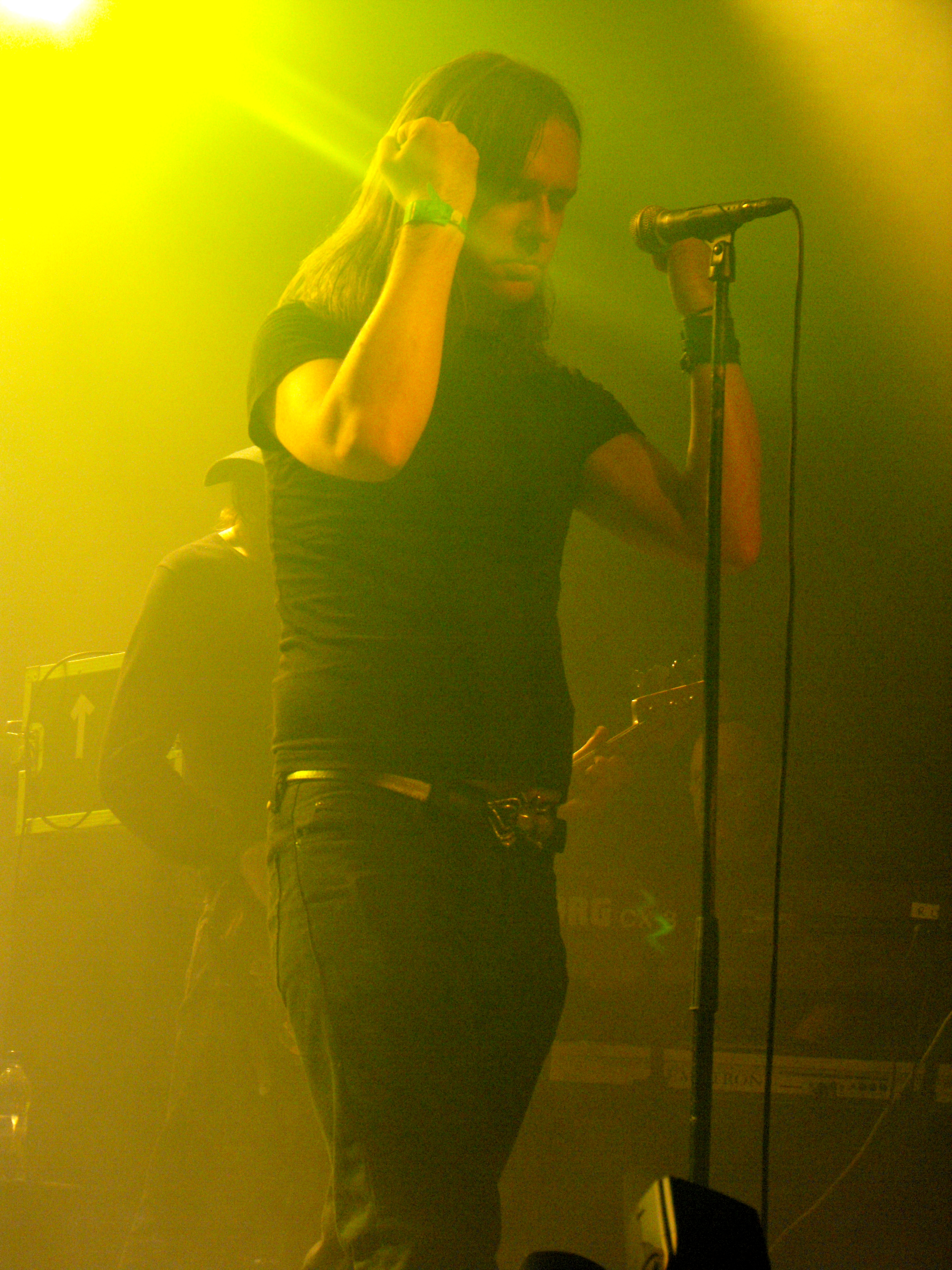

Background information
- Origin: Coventry, England
- Genres: Hardcore punk; crust punk; anarcho-punk; thrashcore
- Years active: 1994–1995, 2013–present
- Labels: Rise Above
- Spinoff of: Cathedral, Repulsion
- Members: Lee Dorrian; Gaz Jennings; Scott Carlson; Jaime "Gomez" Arellano
- Past members: Barry Stern

Septic Tank are a British punk rock band formed out of Coventry doom metal band Cathedral. The band was originally formed in 1994, while Cathedral were on tour, and later reformed in 2013 after Cathedral's breakup. Once the band reunited, producer and former member of the UK band Trouble, Jaime "Gomez" Arellano, replaced drummer Barry Stern, due to his death in 2005. The band have currently released one self-titled EP and one full-length album, entitled "Rotting Civilisation".

== Musical style and influences ==
Septic Tank have cited influences including Crucifix, Amebix, Terrorizer, Siege, Doom, Extreme Noise Terror, Discharge, GISM, Cryptic Slaughter, Minor Threat, Slaughter, Hellhammer, Motörhead, Septic Death and Anti Cimex. Their music has been categorized as hardcore punk, crust punk, doom metal, thrashcore, crossover thrash and anarcho-punk.

== Members ==
=== Current line-up ===
- Lee Dorrian – lead vocals (1994–1995; 2013–present)
- Gaz Jennings – guitar (1994–1995; 2013–present)
- Scott Carlson – bass (1994–1995; 2013–present)
- Jaime "Gomez" Arellano – drums (2013–present)

=== Past members ===
- Barry Stern – drums (1994–1995; died 2005)

== Discography ==
Studio albums

- Rotting Civilisation (2018)

EPs

- Septic Tank (2013)
