= The Carnival Bizarre =

Studio album by Cathedral
- Released: 29 September 1995
- Recorded: 29 May – 14 June 1995
- Studio: Parkgate Studios
- Genre: Stoner metal, doom metal
- Length: 62:48
- Label: Earache
- Producer: Kit Woolven

Cathedral chronology
Statik Majik (1994)	The Carnival Bizarre (1995)	Supernatural Birth Machine (1996)

Professional ratings
Review scores
Source	Rating
AllMusic	4.5/5 stars
Chronicles of Chaos	6/10
Collector's Guide to Heavy Metal	9/10
The Encyclopedia of Popular Music	3/5 stars
Kerrang!	4/5 stars
Metal.de	7/10
Ox-Fanzine	7/10

The Carnival Bizarre is the third studio album by British doom metal band Cathedral, released in September 1995 through Earache Records.

Released in 1996, the related Hopkins (The Witchfinder General) EP features that titular track along with four additional songs.

== Critical reception ==
Jem Aswald, in Trouser Press, wrote: "Pagan idolatry aside, Carnival Bizarre is Cathedral’s best and tightest album yet, rectifying many of the indulgences of the past and concentrating on throbbing grooves and viscous riffage – and a shout-out to Huggy Bear."

== Track listing ==
All tracks are written by Lee Dorrian and Garry Jennings, except where noted

No.	Title	Length
1.	"Vampire Sun" (Written by Jennings, Dorrian and Scott Carlson)	4:06
2.	"Hopkins (The Witchfinder General)"	5:18
3.	"Utopian Blaster"	5:41
4.	"Night of the Seagulls" (Written by Jennings, Dorrian and Carlson)	7:00
5.	"Carnival Bizarre"	8:35
6.	"Inertia's Cave"	6:39
7.	"Fangalactic Supergoria"	5:54
8.	"Blue Light"	3:27
9.	"Palace of Fallen Majesty"	7:43
10.	"Electric Grave"	8:25

Japanese version bonus track
No.	Title	Length
11.	"Karmacopia"	5:06

== Personnel ==
=== Cathedral ===
- Lee Dorrian – vocals, sleeve concept
- Garry Jennings – guitar, mellotron (tracks 5 and 8), keyboard (4, 10), percussion (5, 10), choir (4)
- Leo Smee – bass, mellotron (3, 8), choir (4)
- Brian Dixon – drums, choir (4)

=== Additional musicians ===
- Tony Iommi – guitar (3)
- Kenny Ball – trumpet (7)
- Mitchell Dickinson – gong (3), choir (4)

=== Technical personnel ===
- Kit Woolven – production, engineering
- Doug Cook – assistant engineering
- Noel Summerville – mastering
- Dave Patchett – front cover
- Leilah Wendell – inside art
- Ray Palmer – photography
- Aston Stephens – layout
