= Caravan Beyond Redemption =

Studio album by Cathedral
- Released: 6 December 1998
- Recorded: June–July 1998
- Studios: Chapel Studios, Lincolnshire, England
- Genres: Stoner metal, doom metal
- Length: 72:47
- Label: Earache
- Producer: Andy Sneap

Cathedral chronology
Supernatural Birth Machine (1996)	Caravan Beyond Redemption (1998)	Endtyme (2001)

Professional ratings
Review scores
Source	Rating
AllMusic	4/5 stars
Collector's Guide to Heavy Metal	8/10

Caravan Beyond Redemption is the fifth studio album by British doom metal band Cathedral, released on 6 December 1998 through Earache Records.

The album was well received in Sweden. It received 4 out of 5 in Aftonbladet, as well as the same assessment in Svenska Dagbladet, Expressen, and Göteborgs-Posten, in addition to 3 out of 5 in Östersunds-Posten.

== Track listing ==
All tracks are written by Lee Dorrian, Garry Jennings, Leo Smee and Brian Dixon.

No.	Title	Length
1.	"Voodoo Fire"	6:11
2.	"The Unnatural World"	4:04
3.	"Satanikus Robotikus"	5:01
4.	"Freedom"	5:05
5.	"Captain Clegg"	6:06
6.	"Earth Messiah"	5:17
7.	"The Caravan"	3:00
8.	"Revolution"	7:08
9.	"Kaleidoscope of Desire"	4:45
10.	"Heavy Load"	6:08
11.	"The Omega Man"	5:59
12.	"Dust of Paradise"	14:03

Japanese version bonus track
No.	Title	Length
13.	"Black Sunday"	7:09

== Personnel ==
=== Cathedral ===
- Lee Dorrian – vocals
- Garry Jennings – guitar
- Leo Smee – bass
- Brian Dixon – drums

=== Technical personnel ===
- Andy Sneap – production
- Danny Sprigg – assistant engineering
- Stevie Clow – assistant engineering
- Stu Williamson – photography
