= The Ethereal Mirror =

Studio album by Cathedral
- Released: 24 May 1993 (UK); 6 July 1993 (US)
- Recorded: 1993
- Studio: The Manor Studio, Oxfordshire, England
- Genre: Doom metal; stoner metal
- Length: 54:26
- Label: Earache; Columbia (US)
- Producer: David Bianco

Cathedral chronology
Forest of Equilibrium (1991)	The Ethereal Mirror (1993)	Statik Majik (1994)

Singles from The Ethereal Mirror
- 1. "Ride" Released: 1993; 2. "Midnight Mountain" Released: 1993; 3. "Grim Luxuria" Released: 1993

The Ethereal Mirror is the second studio album by British doom metal band Cathedral. It was first released in the UK on 24 May 1993 by Earache Records, and in the United States on 6 July 1993 by Columbia Records. Earache re-issued the album in 2009 with the Statik Majik EP as bonus tracks and the DVD Ethereal Reflections as DualDisc.

== Artwork ==
The album's front cover artwork unfolds and expands into something "much larger and weirder," according to Kenny Schticky of MetalSucks.

== Reception and legacy ==
Professional ratings
Review scores
Source	Rating
AllMusic	4.5/5 stars
Collector's Guide to Heavy Metal	9/10
The Encyclopedia of Popular Music	4/5 stars
Kerrang!	4/5 stars
Metal.de	8/10
Record-Journal	A
Rock Hard	8.5/10
Rock Sound	9/10

The Ethereal Mirror received critical acclaim. Peter Atkinson of the Record-Journal stated that "By tempering the oppressive gloom of its debut for a more spirited thunder, Britain's Cathedral has crafted the heaviest and most brutally satisfying album of the year." Kerrang!'s Xavier Russell considered it a stronger album than Forest of Equilibrium, praising Lee Dorrian's discernable vocals and the interplay between guitarists Adam Lehan and Garry Jennings. In their retrospective review, Metal.de called the album "a work of transition that seems almost formless in a positive sense, which draws its charm from the close proximity of styles and moods: dark doom here, right next to loosely rocking brain drills". Martin Popoff, writing in The Collector's Guide to Heavy Metal Volume 3: The Nineties (2007), called the album "Fantastically powerful throughout" and singled out "Ride" as the best track in Cathedral's discography up to that point.

In 2000, Terrorizer listed the album as one of the "100 Most Important Albums of the Nineties". In 2005, Kerrang! ranked the album at number 83 on their list of the "100 Best British Rock Albums Ever", stating that it "confirmed [Cathedral's] status as the real Brit metal warlords." In 2014, Decibel ranked the album at number 56 on their list of the "Top 100 Doom Metal Albums of All Time". On Loudwire's 2017 list of the "Top 25 Doom Metal Albums of All Time", it was ranked ninth.

In 2022, Kenny Schticky of MetalSucks included the album in his list of "10 CD Booklets That Should Be Remembered as Fine Art."

== Track listing ==
All lyrics are written by Lee Dorrian, except where noted.

No.	Title	Lyrics	Music	Length
1.	"Violet Vortex (Intro)" (instrumental)		Garry Jennings	1:54
2.	"Ride"		Jennings	4:47
3.	"Enter the Worms"	Lee Dorrian; David Bianco	Adam Lehan	6:05
4.	"Midnight Mountain"	Dorrian; Bianco	Lehan	4:55
5.	"Fountain of Innocence"		Jennings	7:13
6.	"Grim Luxuria"		Lehan	4:46
7.	"Jaded Entity"	Dorrian; Bianco	Jennings	7:53
8.	"Ashes You Leave"	Dorrian; Bianco	Jennings	6:22
9.	"Phantasmagoria"	Dorrian; Bianco	Jennings	8:44
10.	"Imprisoned in Flesh"	Dorrian; Bianco	Jennings	1:47
Total length:				54:26

1996 CD re-issue bonus tracks
No.	Title	Length
11.	"Sky Lifter" (instrumental)	3:27
12.	"A Funeral Request (New 1993 Version)"	7:37

== Personnel ==
Cathedral

- Garry Jennings – guitar, bass
- Lee Dorrian – vocals
- Mark Ramsey Wharton – drums
- Adam Lehan – guitar

Technical personnel

- David Bianco – recording, production, mixing
- Shaun DeFo – engineering
- Dave Patchett – cover painting
- Summer Lacy – inside layout

== Release history ==
Release history for The Ethereal Mirror
Region	Label	Format	Date	Catalog #	Ref.
Europe	Earache	CD; CS; LP	24 May 1993	MOSH 77	
United States	Columbia	CD; CS	6 July 1993	CK 53633	
United States	Earache	CD; CS	10 September 1996	MOSH 77	
Various	Earache	DualDisc	1 July 2009	MOSH077CDD	
Various	Earache	LP	5 April 2019	MOSH077LPUS	

== Bibliography ==
- Anon. (22 May 1993). "New Releases" (PDF). Music Week. p. 12 – via worldradiohistory.com.
- Anon. (November 1996). "Earache Records Presents the 'Welcome Home' Campaign". Hit Parader (Advertisement). No. 386. Hit Parader Publications. p. 15 – via Internet Archive.
- Atkinson, Peter (13 August 1993). "Music: Off the Record". Record-Journal. p. 26.
- Bird, Ashley, ed. (19 February 2005). "The 100 Best British Rock Albums Ever!". Kerrang!. No. 1044. EMAP. pp. 20–32, 34–36.
- Fury, Jeanne (November 2014). "The Top 100 Doom Metal Albums of All Time". Decibel Presents the Top 100 Doom Metal Albums of All Time. Red Flag Media, Inc. ISSN 1550-6614.
- Duffy, Thom (7 August 1993). "Labels Get Earache in Licensing/Distrib Deal" (PDF). Billboard. Vol. 105, no. 32. Nielsen Business Media, Inc. p. 39 – via worldradiohistory.com.
- Kalsi, Satpal (February 2000). "The 100 Most Important Albums of the Nineties". Terrorizer. No. 75. Scantec Publishing Ltd. p. 38. ISSN 1350-6978.
- Kerswell, Ronnie (June 2009). "Cathedral – The Ethereal Mirror". Rock Sound. No. 123. London: Freeway Press. p. 84. ISSN 1465-0185. OCLC 63197250.
- Larkin, Colin, ed. (1998). "Cathedral". The Encyclopedia of Popular Music. Vol. 2. MUZE Inc. pp. 990–991. ISBN 0-333-74134-X – via Internet Archive.
- Popoff, Martin (2007). The Collector's Guide to Heavy Metal: Volume 3: The Nineties. Burlington, Ontario, Canada: Collector's Guide Publishing. p. 73. ISBN 978-1-894959-62-9.
- Russell, Xavier (29 May 1993). "Rekordz". Kerrang!. No. 445. EMAP. p. 50.
