= Forest of Equilibrium =

Studio album by Cathedral
- Released: 21 October 1991 (UK); 11 February 1992 (US)
- Recorded: July–August 1991
- Studios: Workshop Studios, Redditch, England
- Genre: Doom metal
- Length: 54:09
- Labels: Earache, Relativity
- Producers: Steve Gurney (a.k.a. PBL); Lee Dorrian; Gary Jennings

Cathedral chronology
In Memorium EP (1990)	Forest of Equilibrium (1991)	The Ethereal Mirror (1993)

Professional ratings
Review scores
Source	Rating
AllMusic	4/5 stars
Collector's Guide to Heavy Metal	6/10
The Encyclopedia of Popular Music	2/5 stars
Kerrang!	(1991) (2011)
Metal.de	9/10
Metal Forces	95/100
Ox-Fanzine	5/5 stars
Rock Hard	9/10

Forest of Equilibrium is the debut studio album by British doom metal band Cathedral, released on 21 October 1991 through Earache Records. It is considered a classic of its genre, doom metal. Forest of Equilibrium was notably inducted into Decibel magazine's Hall of Fame in February 2006 being the 12th inductee for the Decibel Hall of Fame.

In 2009, Earache Records reissued the album along with four "bonus" songs that comprise the long-out-of-print 1992 Soul Sacrifice EP. This deluxe digipak reissue also includes a poster of Dave Patchett's cover art and a new 40-minute documentary entitled "Return to the Forest" on DVD.

== Music ==
Chris Chantler of Metal Hammer said the album was "the result of their mutual doom obsession, twisted by their own forward-thinking extreme impulses."

== Legacy ==
Chris Chantler of Metal Hammer said in 2020 that the album "remains truly a unique, pivotal recording."

== Track listing ==
All lyrics by Lee Dorrian unless noted; all music by Garry Jennings unless noted

No.	Title	Lyrics	Music	Length
1.	"Picture of Beauty & Innocence (Intro)/Commiserating the Celebration"			11:16
2.	"Ebony Tears"			7:46
3.	"Serpent Eve"	Mark Griffiths	Jennings, Adam Lehan	7:40
4.	"Soul Sacrifice"	Griffiths		2:54
5.	"A Funeral Request (Ethereal Architect)"	Griffiths, David Park Barnitz	Lehan	9:17
6.	"Equilibrium"			6:08
7.	"Reaching Happiness, Touching Pain"			9:08

== Personnel ==
Personnel per liner notes.

Cathedral

- Lee Dorrian – vocals, production assistant
- Garry Jennings – guitar, production assistant
- Adam Lehan – guitar, acoustic guitar
- Mark Griffiths – bass guitar
- Mike Smail – drums

Additional personnel

- Reverend Wolski – keyboard
- Helen Acreman – flute

Production

- Steve Gurney – production (credited as PBL)
- Mark Tempest – engineering
- Dave Patchett – sleeve artwork
- Jason Tilley – photos
- J. Barry – layout

== Bibliography ==
- Alexander, Phil, ed. (31 August 1991). "Record News". Raw. No. 79. EMAP. p. 7.
- Ayers, Chris (19 April 1996). "There's no Trouble in the Cathedral when these bands play". The Herald. Rock Hill. p. 7D.
- Badin, Olivier (May 2006). "The Depths of Doom". Terrorizer. No. 144. Dark Arts Ltd. p. 52.
- Bennett, J. (February 2006). "Doom On: The Making of Cathedral's Forest of Equilibrium". Decibel. No. 16. Red Flag Media, Inc. pp. 42–44, 46–48, 50.
- Dome, Malcolm (December 1991). "Albums". Metal Forces. No. 67. Force10 Publications. p. 29. OCLC 859210254.
- Gitter, Mike (26 October 1991). "Rekordz". Kerrang!. No. 364. EMAP. p. 22.
- Larkin, Colin, ed. (1998). "Cathedral". The Encyclopedia of Popular Music. Vol. 2. MUZE Inc. pp. 990–991. ISBN 0-333-74134-X – via Internet Archive.
- Popoff, Martin (2007). The Collector's Guide to Heavy Metal: Volume 3: The Nineties. Burlington, Ontario, Canada: Collector's Guide Publishing. p. 73. ISBN 978-1-894959-62-9.
- Ruskell, Nick (November 2011). "Cathedral: Forest of Equilibrium". Kerrang!: 666 Albums You Must Hear Before You Die!. Bauer Media Group. p. 24.
