= Endtyme =

Studio album by Cathedral
- Released: 26 February 2001
- Recorded: 17 July – 6 August 2000
- Studio: Chapel Studios, South Thoresby, England
- Genre: Doom metal
- Length: 63:45
- Label: Earache
- Producer: Billy Anderson

Cathedral chronology
Caravan Beyond Redemption (1998)	Endtyme (2001)	The VIIth Coming (2002)

Professional ratings
Review scores
Source	Rating
AllMusic	2.5/5 stars
Brave Words & Bloody Knuckles	6/10
Chronicles of Chaos	9.5/10
Collector's Guide to Heavy Metal	6/10
Metal.de	3/10
Rock Hard	7/10

Endtyme is the sixth studio album by British doom metal band Cathedral, released in 2001 through Earache Records.

The album is considered a return to the dark and gloomy sound present on the band's debut album. The cover artwork was created by Sunn O))) guitarist Stephen O'Malley. It was the first Cathedral album to not feature cover artwork created by Dave Patchett.

== Track listing ==
1. "Cathedral Flames" – 1:59
2. "Melancholy Emperor" – 5:32
3. "Requiem for the Sun" – 6:54
4. "Whores to Oblivion" – 6:32
5. "Alchemist of Sorrows" – 7:16
6. "Ultra Earth" – 9:22
7. "Astral Queen" – 6:39
8. "Sea Serpent" – 5:48
9. "Templars Arise! (The Return)" – 13:39
10. "Gargoylian" – 7:47 (Japanese edition bonus track)
