= Lee Dorrian =

British singer (born 1968)

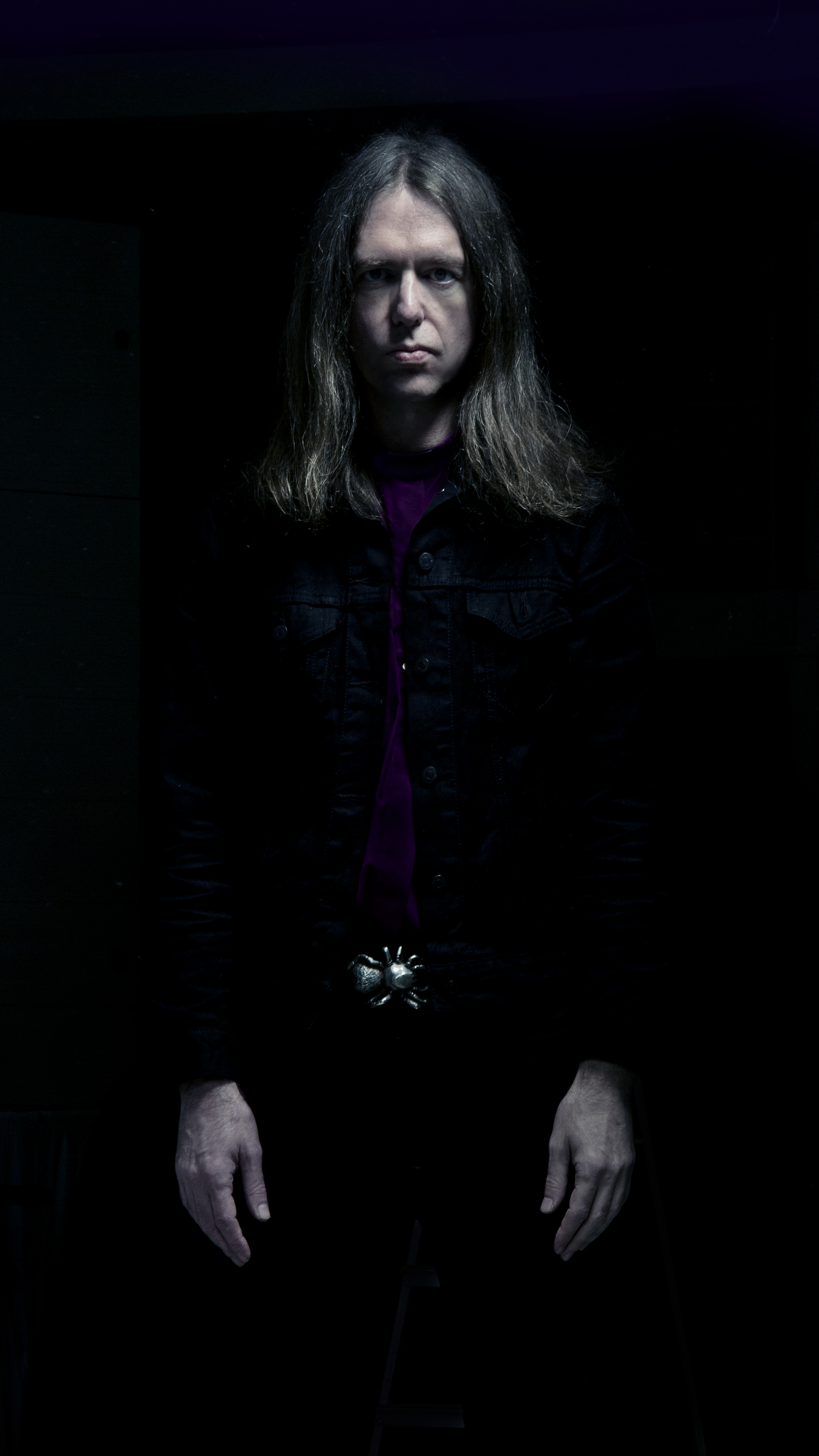
- Dorrian in 2016

Background information
- Born: Lee Robert Dorrian; 5 June 1968 (age 58)
- Origin: Coventry, England
- Genres: Doom metal, stoner metal, crust punk, grindcore (early)
- Occupation: Singer
- Years active: 1986–present
- Member of: Septic Tank, With the Dead
- Formerly of: Cathedral, Napalm Death, Teeth of Lions Rule the Divine

Lee Robert Dorrian (born 5 June 1968) is an English singer, best known as a former member of grindcore band Napalm Death and later as frontman of doom metal band Cathedral. He is currently singing with Septic Tank and With the Dead.

== Career ==
During his early teenage years, Dorrian was the editor of a local punk fanzine called Committed Suicide. This led to him becoming a local punk promoter during the mid-late 80s, bringing bands such as B.G.K., Amebix, Antisect, Negazione, AntiCimex, Disorder, Bannlyst, Heresy, Icons of Filth, Anti System, Conflict, Concrete Sox, The Varukers and many others to various Coventry venues, such as the back room of The Hand & Heart public house on Far Gosford Street. During this time he was a passionate animal rights activist and involved in various anarchist groups and demonstrations.

In April 1987 he became vocalist and lyricist with Napalm Death, recording one and a half albums with them, namely the second side of Scum and the whole From Enslavement to Obliteration album, plus the Mentally Murdered ep. During his time in the band, they were majorly championed by John Peel and recorded two sessions for his Radio One show. The band also made several significant TV appearances on BBC shows such as Snub TV, Arena and children's music show What's That Noise? They also appeared on the front cover of NME, which was the inspiration to the lyrics of a song "No Mental Effort". This track appeared on Dorrian's final recording with Napalm Death, on the Mentally Murdered EP. To coincide with its release in 1989, friend Peel had helped to arrange a slot for them at Reading Festival. Unfortunately, the appearance had to be cancelled as Dorrian left the band due to disillusionment following their tour of Japan in July of that year.

Whilst still a member of Napalm Death, Dorrian founded his own record label, Rise Above Records in 1988. Initially intended as a means to get him off the dole, Rise Above was kick-started as part of the Enterprise Allowance Scheme. His main aim was to release a few hardcore punk 7-inch singles in extremely limited runs, just for fun. However, the label went from strength to strength and is today one of the most revered underground independent record labels in existence. Some of the artists that Dorrian has introduced to the world via Rise Above Records include Ghost, Electric Wizard, Uncle Acid & the Deadbeats, Circulus, Blood Ceremony and many more.

Later in 1989, Dorrian formed doom metal band Cathedral, releasing their debut album Forest of Equilibrium in 1991. The album is considered a genuine cult classic and a cornerstone in the evolution of the genre. Cathedral existed as a band for over 23 years before deciding to call it a day in 2012, ahead of releasing their final album The Last Spire in 2013. During their lengthy career, they played as main support to Black Sabbath on their Cross Purposes tour in 1994. As a result, the band became friendly with Tony Iommi, which led to him making a very rare guest appearance on Cathedral's 1995 album The Carnival Bizarre.

In 1995, Dorrian collaborated with Italian musician Paul Chain, with whom he co-wrote four songs which appeared on the Alkahest album. He appeared as vocalist/lyricist in extreme doom project Teeth of Lions Rule the Divine, featuring members of Sunn O))) and Iron Monkey, releasing the one-off album 'Rampton' in 2002. In 2003, he appeared on the Probot album, which was curated by his old friend and former Nirvana drummer Dave Grohl.

Dorrian is currently a member of With the Dead, in which he is joined by former Electric Wizard bassist Tim Bagshaw, along with former Cathedral bassist Leo Smee and former Bolt Thrower drummer Alex Thomas. Their self-titled debut album was released on Rise Above Records in October 2015.

Dorrian first used an extreme and ferocious death grunt style of vocal mixed with hardcore screaming in Napalm Death, but later adopted a cleaner and more varied style with Cathedral.

He presented an award to Napalm Death at the Metal Hammer Golden Gods Awards 2007.

== Influences ==
Dorrian has cited influences including Kelvin "Cal" Morris from Discharge, Pete Lyons from Antisect, Dean Jones from Extreme Noise Terror and Sakevi Yokoyama from GISM.

== Personal life ==
Dorrian is from Wood End in Coventry. He has said he has a long history as an anti-fascist activist. He has claimed he was an anti-racist skinhead in his teens and received death threats from neo-Nazi skinheads and white supremacists. Dorrian also says he became a vegetarian at the age of 13. In a 2017 interview he stated that he has not eaten meat in 36 years. He says he has since experimented with a vegan diet.

== Discography ==
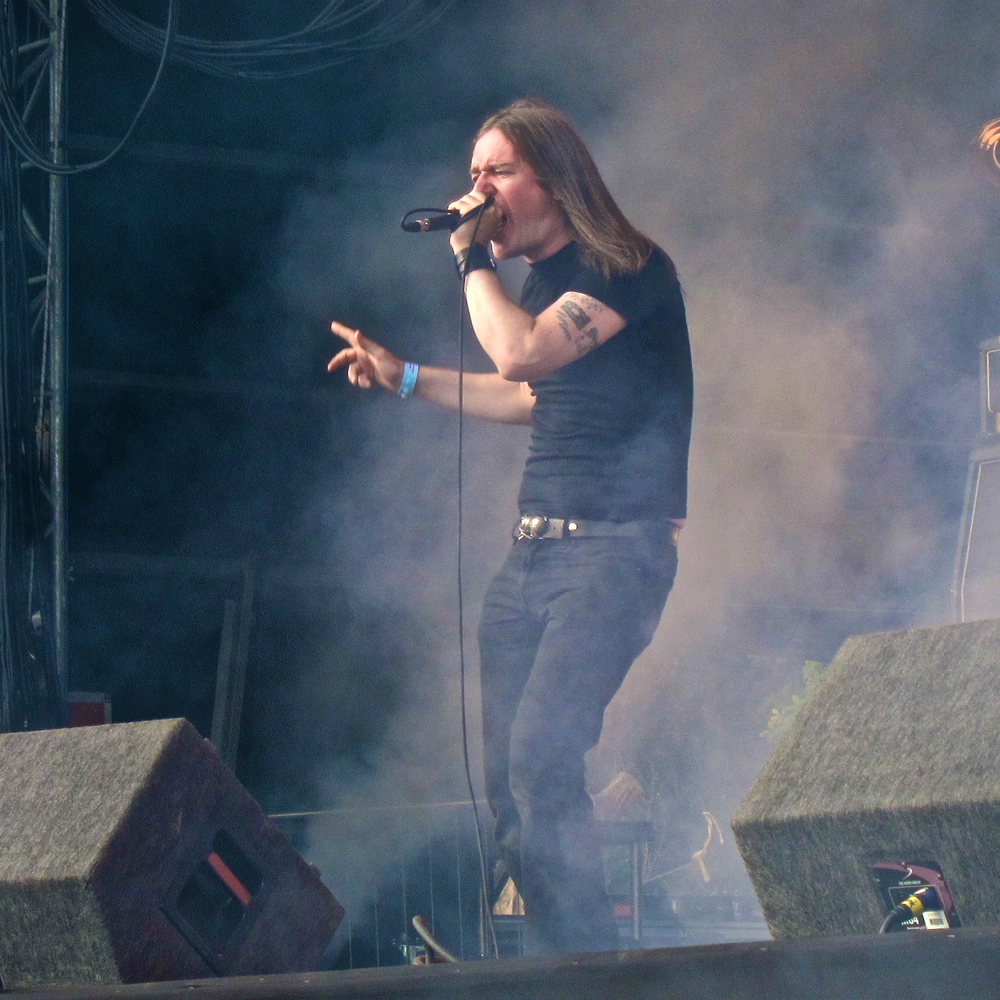
Dorrian performing in 2010

=== Napalm Death ===
- 1987 – Scum (track 13–28)
- 1988 – From Enslavement to Obliteration
- 1988 – The Curse
- 1989 – Live
- 1989 – Mentally Murdered
- 1989 – Napalm Death/S.O.B. split 7-inch
- 1989 – The Peel Sessions (track 1–8)
- 1992 – Death by Manipulation (track 8–19)
- 2000 – The Complete Radio One Sessions (track 1–8)
- 2003 – Noise for Music's Sake (track 4, 14, 28–34, 45–51)

=== Cathedral ===
- 1990 – In Memoriam
- 1991 – Demo # 2
- 1991 – Forest of Equilibrium
- 1992 – Soul Sacrifice
- 1993 – The Ethereal Mirror
- 1994 – Cosmic Requiem
- 1994 – In Memoriam
- 1994 - Statik Majic
- 1995 – The Carnival Bizarre
- 1996 – Supernatural Birth Machine
- 1996 – Hopkins (The Witchfinder General)
- 1998 – Caravan Beyond Redemption
- 2001 – Endtyme
- 2002 – The VIIth Coming
- 2005 – The Garden of Unearthly Delights
- 2010 – The Guessing Game
- 2013 – The Last Spire

=== Teeth of Lions Rule the Divine ===
- 2002 – Rampton

=== Septic Tank ===
- 2013 - The Slaughter
- 2018 - Rotting Civilisation

=== With the Dead ===
- 2015 – With the Dead
- 2017 – Love from with the Dead

== Collaborations ==
| Release | Band | Member | Year |
|---|---|---|---|
| Erased – Symbol of Life | Paradise Lost | Guest backing vocals | 2002 |
| Ice Cold Man - Probot | Probot | Guest vocals | 2004 |
