= Cathedral (band) =

English doom metal band

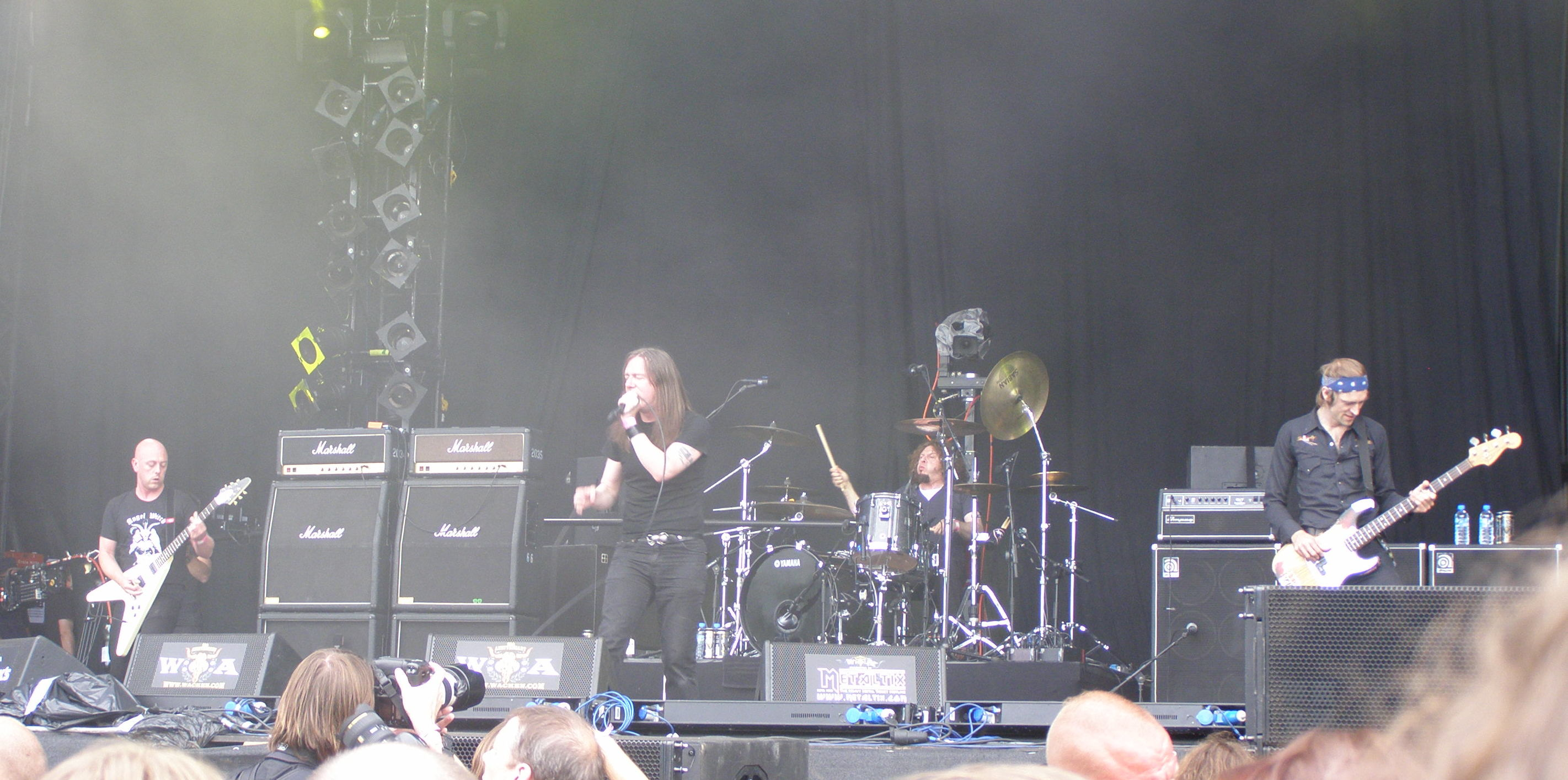
- Cathedral performing at the Wacken Open Air festival in 2009

Background information
- Origin: Coventry, England
- Genres: Doom metal; stoner metal
- Years active: 1989–2013
- Labels: Columbia/Sony; Dream Catcher; Earache; Nuclear Blast; Rise Above; Southern Lord; Ultimatum; Spitfire; Relativity
- Spinoffs: Septic Tank; Workshed
- Spinoff of: Napalm Death; Acid Reign
- Past members: Lee Dorrian; Garry Jennings; Adam Lehan; Mark Griffiths; Ben Mochrie; Mike Smail; Mark Ramsey Wharton; Brian Dixon; Leo Smee; Scott Carlson
- Website: cathedralcoven.com

Cathedral were a British doom metal band from Coventry, England. The group gained attention upon release of its debut album, Forest of Equilibrium (1991), which is considered a classic of the genre. However, the band's sound evolved quickly and began to adopt characteristics of 1970s metal, hard rock and progressive rock. After releasing ten full-length albums and touring extensively for over two decades, Cathedral broke up after the release of The Last Spire in 2013.

== History ==
=== Early history (1989–1991) ===
In July 1989, Lee Dorrian left Napalm Death because he was reportedly tiring of the punk scene and did not like the death metal direction which Napalm Death was taking. Cathedral was formed after Lee Dorrian and Mark Griffiths (a Carcass roadie) met and discussed their love for bands like Black Sabbath, Candlemass, Pentagram, Trouble, and Witchfinder General. The band was founded in 1989 by Dorrian, Griffiths and Garry Jennings (formerly of thrash metal band Acid Reign). Dorrian was the only founding member to remain with Cathedral for its duration, although Jennings' departure ultimately proved to be temporary. Cathedral released Forest of Equilibrium through Earache. According to Dorrian, only Winter or Autopsy were doing something similar, sound-wise, at the time.

=== The Columbia years (1992–1994) ===
After the release of the Soul Sacrifice EP, Cathedral signed with Columbia Records. That enabled the successful two-month Campaign for Musical Destruction Tour in the United States. Cathedral's experience on Columbia was described by Dorrian as "surreal". As Dorrian explained,

We weren’t deliberately trying to be pop stars or anything like that, so playing that game just felt very surreal. We weren't exactly comfortable with it. We were an underground band one minute and the next minute they were trying to present us as the next Black Crowes. Can you imagine recording Forest of Equilibrium and a major label wanted to sign you on the strength of that? It was fairly bizarre. I guess heavy music was reaching some kind of pinnacle back then. Death metal had reached its pinnacle back then – at least its creative pinnacle so maybe they saw us as being the next step after that.

Cathedral toured the US with Carcass, Napalm Death and Brutal Truth on the Campaign for Musical Destruction tour in 1992.

Cathedral's major label debut, The Ethereal Mirror, was noted by Jason Birchmeier of Allmusic for its experimentation, upbeat tempos, and groove-laden guitar riffs. After releasing The Ethereal Mirror in 1993, Cathedral was dropped by Columbia the following year.

=== Back to Earache (1995–2001) ===
The band resumed its relationship with Earache Records, which lasted until 2001. During this time, Cathedral released four full-length albums that continued to explore faster rhythms and 1970s-hard rock-influenced guitar riffs before returning to a relatively slow cadence for Endtyme in 2001.

=== Switching labels (2002–2010) ===
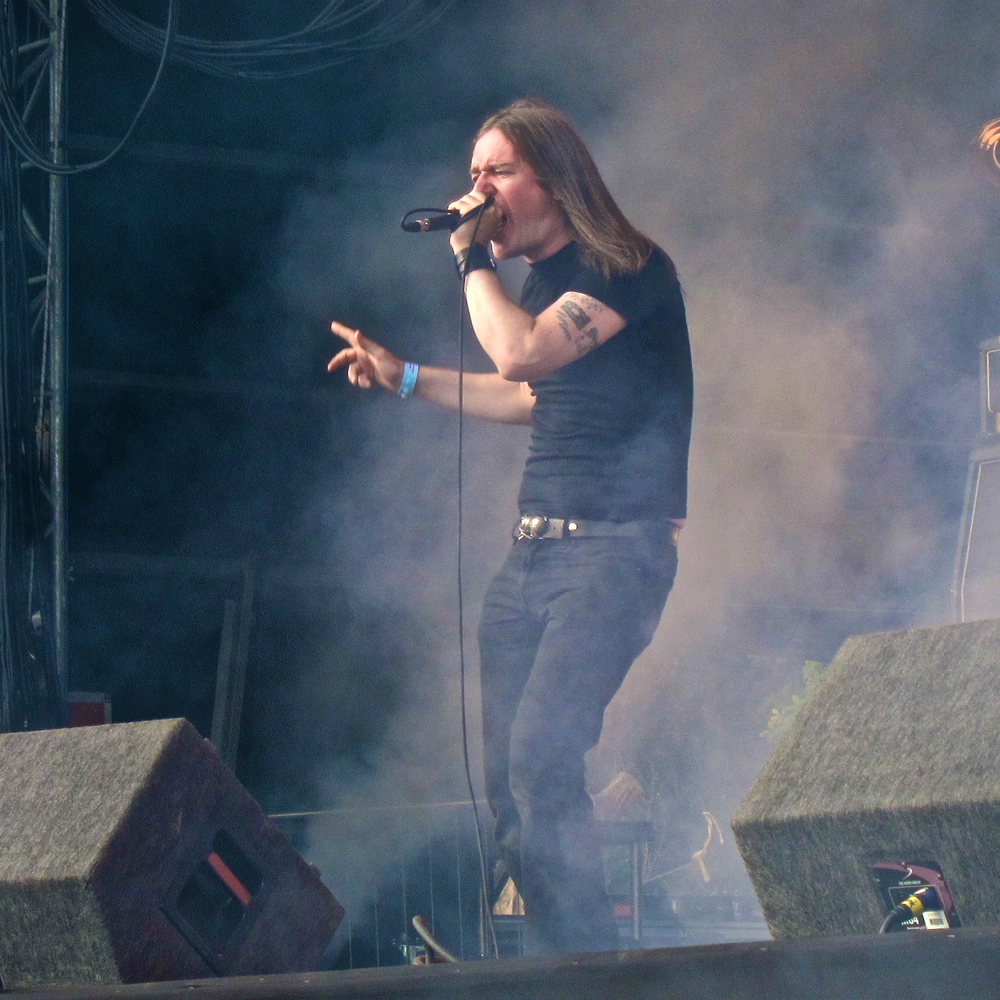
Lead vocalist Lee Dorrian performing in 2010

Cathedral signed with Spitfire Records and released The VIIth Coming. After releasing a single album on Spitfire, Cathedral signed to Nuclear Blast for their final three albums. These albums included the "inspired" and "quirky" but "uneven" The Garden of Unearthly Delights, the double-disc The Guessing Game, which was touted as the "most psychedelic, progressive material in the band's entire catalog" and the "true doom" of the band's farewell album, The Last Spire.

=== The Last Spire and split (2011–present) ===
While Cathedral had contemplated disbanding in the past, most recently after the release of The Garden of Unearthly Delights in 2006, on 6 February 2011, Cathedral announced that they would disband after the release of The Last Spire in April 2013. Dorrian explained that "It's simply time for us to bow out. Twenty one years is a very long time and it's almost a miracle that we managed to come this far!" Cathedral played their last show in Perth, Western Australia during the Soundwave 2012 tour.

Shortly before the release of The Last Spire, Dorrian told Noisecreep that there would never be a Cathedral reunion, and called that idea "absolutely stupid." Guitarist Gaz Jennings added that chances of a Cathedral reunion were "very, very slim", and that he "just can't see" it happening in the future. He also stated that Dorrian has "moved on" and did not want to be involved in a reunion. Three out of four of the final members of Cathedral reformed the band Septic Tank after Cathedral's break up.

When asked in July 2020 by Decibel magazine about the possibility of a Cathedral reunion, Dorrian said: "To just reform and cash in on the lucrative offers we've been getting ever since we broke up would feel a bit like we're just doing it for the cash, which is never what it was about in the first place. Never say never, I guess, but it's very doubtful. We ended it for a reason."

== Musical style ==
Cathedral's releases have been marked by sharp shifts in style. Dan Epstein of Guitar World has been quoted as saying, "The fantastically heavy Cathedral remain one of the most respected and influential purveyors of doom/stoner metal." While Forest of Equilibrium was firmly entrenched in a slow, heavy doom sound, elements of 1970s metal and groovier riffs entered its sound beginning with the Soul Sacrifice EP. By the time that The Ethereal Mirror was released, the band had incorporated references to 1970s music, such as the disco influences heard on "Midnight Mountain".

As Dorrian explains, the band's original sound was a product of the immediate musical environment combined with the band members' influences:

When we first started, the music of Cathedral was a lot more extreme than it is now, a lot more morose and depressing, because that's how we felt at the time. We'd all come out of the death metal scene, or the grindcore scene or whatever, and I was just as much into the slower stuff as I was into the faster stuff. I just wanted to do something a bit different, so we took all our influences like Vitus and Pentagram and the Obsessed and stuff and decided to take that kind of music one step further, bring it into the 90's, make it more extreme, more heavy and downtuned than any of those bands had done before. That was our first and foremost ambition, and I think we probably achieved that when we did our first album.

Beginning with the Soul Sacrifice EP, the band began to incorporate a diverse array of 1970s influences into its sound. With 2001's Endtyme, Cathedral re-introduced the slower, doomy elements that had not been as prevalent on its previous four albums. The band also began to incorporate elements of progressive rock and stoner rock during this time.

The Guessing Game represented another development in the band's sound, with Cathedral's progressive and psychedelic influences coming to the forefront. For Dorrian, the album's direction was a result of the fact that:

This time on the record it seemed like we've come to the point where we feel confident enough to bring these influences to the fore. Because we also feel that we've got nothing to lose as well, after all this time. We've got nothing to prove as much as we've got nothing to lose. I just think we went for it, we didn't really think too hard about what the consequences would be, but I don’t think we went stupidly too far into the realms of progressive rock myself, it's just the right balance between that and everything else that the band's about.

Remarking on Cathedral's penchant for evolving its sound, Dorrian said:

I just think it’s important for a band like us, if we have all these influences and aspects of things we like, to be a bit more adventurous and make it interesting for ourselves as much as the audience. It might confuse a lot of people, I understand that, but that’s not a deliberate intention at all. We just want to make good music to the best of our abilities. We’re not the most musical band in the world, I admit that. We just want to push ourselves and stretch ourselves and contain an element of freedom of expression in our sound. I guess that’s why we look back on a lot of older bands, because they were so unrestricted, and things are too restricted and categorized these days. If you think about a band like Cathedral, how would you categorize us? I don’t know. I don’t know what box you could put us in, and that’s something I’m quite happy with. Try and put me in a box and I jump out of it.

== Members ==
=== Final line-up ===
- Lee Dorrian – vocals (1989–2013)
- Garry Jennings – guitars (1989–2013), bass (1993–1994), keyboards (1994–1996)
- Brian Dixon – drums (1994–2013)
- Scott Carlson – bass (2011–2013)

=== Former members ===
- Andy Baker – drums (1989)
- Adam Lehan – guitars (1989–1994)
- Mark Griffiths – bass (1989–1993), guitars (1989)
- Ben Mochrie – drums (1989–1991)
- Mike Smail – drums (1991–1992)
- Mark Ramsey Wharton – drums, flute (1992–1994), keyboards (1992)
- Leo Smee – bass, keyboards, flute (1994–2011)

=== Live musicians ===
- Victor Griffin – guitars (1994)
- Joe Hasselvander – drums (1994)
- Barry Stern – drums (1994–1995)
- Dave Hornyak – drums (1995)
- Max Edwards – bass (2003–2004)

== Discography ==
- Forest of Equilibrium (1991)
- The Ethereal Mirror (1993)
- The Carnival Bizarre (1995)
- Supernatural Birth Machine (1996)
- Caravan Beyond Redemption (1998)
- Endtyme (2001)
- The VIIth Coming (2002)
- The Garden of Unearthly Delights (2005)
- The Guessing Game (2010)
- The Last Spire (2013)

== Awards and nominations ==
Decibel Hall of Fame
Year	Nominee / work	Award	Result
2006	Forest of Equilibrium	Decibel Hall of Fame	Inducted
2024	The Ethereal Mirror	Decibel Hall of Fame	Inducted

== Bibliography ==
- "Doom Top Tens: The Depths of Doom" (2006). Terrorizer, 144, 52–53.
