= Invaders (compilation album) =

Compilation album by Various artists
- Released: June 14, 2006
- Genre: Hard rock, heavy metal
- Label: Kemado Records

Professional ratings
Review scores
Source	Rating
Allmusic	link

Invaders is a compilation album released by Kemado Records in 2006. The compilation contains many bands that are signed to the label as well as others bands in a similar classic/traditional hard rock/heavy metal vein. Some songs may have been unreleased or hard to find prior to the compilation.

== Track listing ==
1. Saviours – "Circle of Servants Bodies"
2. Danava – "By the Mark"
3. Big Business – "As the Day Was Dawning"
4. Black Mountain – "Behind the Fall"
5. The Sword – "Under the Boughs"
6. Dungen – "Christopher"
7. Witch – "Rip Van Winkle"
8. The Fucking Champs – "The Loge"
9. Torche – "Mentor"
10. Pelican – "Ran Amber"
11. High on Fire – "Devilution (Radio Edit)"
12. Witchcraft – "Queen of Bees (Live)"
13. Comets on Fire – "Wolf Eyes (Middle Version)"
14. Diamond Nights – "12 Walls"
15. Wolfmother – "Love Train"
16. Night After Night – "Backseat Astronaut"
17. Warhammer 48k – "Get Bodacious"
18. Parchman Farm – "Curtis Franklin"
