= Danava =

Danava may refer to:

- Danava (Hinduism), a race of people in Vedic mythology
- Danava dynasty, a mythological dynasty of Assam, India
- Danava (band), an American hard rock band
  - Danava (album), their 2006 debut album
