= A Sectioned Beam =

EP by Lansing-Dreiden
- Released: November 16, 2004
- Genre: indie rock, post-rock, dream pop
- Label: Kemado Records
- Producer: Lansing-Dreiden

A Sectioned Beam is Lansing-Dreiden's follow up extended play (EP) to their debut album, The Incomplete Triangle. It was released by Kemado Records on November 16, 2004, and was reissued on vinyl by Kemado imprint Mexican Summer in 2013.

== Critical reception ==
Professional ratings
Review scores
| Source | Rating |
|---|---|
| Allmusic | 3/5 stars |
| The Phoenix | 3/5 stars |
| Pitchfork Media | 5.4/10 (original) |
| Pitchfork Media | 7.5/10 (reissue) |
| Spectrum Culture | 3.5/5 stars |

Adrienne Day of Spin described the EP's music as ranging in styles from "dreamy space rock to sticky drum-machine retro-pop, with a psychedelic twist." Pitchfork Media's David Moore wrote that A Sectioned Beam is "all smoke and mirrors, occasionally pretty but largely forgettable", and that the group "overextends itself at the expense of its music, which has arguably never sounded thinner or less cohesive." James Christopher Monger of Allmusic said the EP "further cements the group as early-'90s Brit-pop revivalists posing as obtuse art-crowd misanthropes." Monger added that the collective's "impeccably executed pop songs are far less pretentious than their crippled social persona would suggest." Entertainment Weekly writer Suzanne Ely remarked that Lansing-Dreiden "deliver a heady mix built around ambitious Pet Sounds-style orchestrations" on this EP.

Reviewing the 2013 reissue, Pitchfork's Miles Raymer suggested that A Sectioned Beam "evokes both new wave and the Madchester sound, which at the time struck some critics as outre but after years of chillwave acts doing a similar thing it seems strange to think of as out of the ordinary."

== Track listing ==
Side A
| No. | Title | Length |
|---|---|---|
| 1. | "Locks in Shadows" | 3:21 |
| 2. | "Spectrum of Vapor" | 4:49 |
| 3. | "A Sectioned Beam" | 4:17 |
| 4. | "First Response" | 4:34 |
| Total length: | | 17:01 |

Side B – 2013 Re-issue exclusive
| No. | Title | Length |
|---|---|---|
| 5. | "Seaside" | 14:53 |
| Total length: | | 31:54 |
