= The Black Magic Show =

Studio album by Elefant
- Released: April 20, 2006
- Genre: Post-punk revival, indie rock
- Length: 41:41
- Label: Kemado • Hollywood
- Producer: Don Gilmore

Elefant chronology
Sunlight Makes Me Paranoid (2003)	The Black Magic Show (2006)

The Black Magic Show is the second and final album by the American indie rock band Elefant. It peaked at #14 on the Billboard Top Heatseekers chart.

The third track, "Lolita", is based loosely on the novel of the same name by Vladimir Nabokov.

== Critical reception ==
Professional ratings
Aggregate scores
Source	Rating
Metacritic	55/100
Review scores
Source	Rating
AllMusic	3/5 stars
Pitchfork	3.6/10
PopMatters	5/10
Prefix	4/10

The Black Magic Show was met with "mixed or average" reviews from critics. At Metacritic, which assigns a weighted average rating out of 100 to reviews from mainstream publications, this release received an average score of 55 based on 10 reviews.

Writing for AllMusic, MacKenzie Wilson explained: "While this album doesn't do anything drastic on an artistic level, The Black Magic Show does feature some danceable style. A little more sincerity and a little less swagger might have been nice, though."

== Track listing ==
All tracks are written by Diego Garcia.

No.	Title	Length
1.	"Black Magic Show"	2:55
2.	"Sirens"	3:48
3.	"Lolita"	3:30
4.	"The Clown"	3:50
5.	"Uh Oh Hello"	3:15
6.	"Why"	3:52
7.	"Brasil"	2:57
8.	"My Apology"	3:30
9.	"The Lunatic"	3:24
10.	"It's a Shame"	3:43
11.	"Don't Wait"	4:25

Japanese bonus version
No.	Title	Length
12.	"Allison"	3:31
13.	"A-Oh Hello"	3:08
14.	"Stay" (Acoustic version)	3:31

== Charts ==
Chart performance for The Black Magic Show
Chart (2006)	Peak position
US Heatseekers Albums (Billboard)	14
