= Acrimony =

Acrimony may refer to:

- a feeling of hatred
- Acrimony (band), a rock band
- Acrimony (film), a 2018 film

== See also ==
- Agrimony, a plant
- Acremonium, a genus of fungi
