= 13 Candles =

13 Candles or Thirteen Candles may refer to:

== Television ==
- "13 Candles" (Full House), a 1990 episode
- "Thirteen Candles" (Beyblade), a 2001 episode
- "Thirteen Candles" (Sydney to the Max), a 2020 episode

== Music ==
- 13 Candles, a gothic metal band featuring Dan Finch
- "13 Candles", a song by Bathory from Under the Sign of the Black Mark, 1987
- "13 Candles", a song by Sarke from Vorunah, 2009
- "13 Candles", a song by Uncle Acid & the Deadbeats from Blood Lust, 2011
