= Sunlight Makes Me Paranoid =

Studio album by Elefant
- Released: April 8, 2003
- Genres: Post-punk revival, indie rock
- Length: 32:32
- Label: Kemado • Hollywood
- Producer: Tom Clapp

Elefant chronology
Gallery Girl (2003)	Sunlight Makes Me Paranoid (2003)	The Black Magic Show (2006)

Sunlight Makes Me Paranoid is the debut full-length album by American rock band Elefant. Originally released on April 8, 2003 by Kemado Records, it was re-released in October 2004 on Hollywood Records following the success of the single "Misfit".

== Critical reception ==
Professional ratings
Aggregate scores
Source	Rating
Metacritic	70/100
Review scores
Source	Rating
Allmusic	3/5 stars
Drowned in Sound	(7/10)
Pitchfork	(6.9/10)
Prefix Mag	(6/10)
Tiny Mix Tapes	2/5 stars

Sunlight Makes Me Paranoid was met with "generally favorable" reviews from critics. At Metacritic, which assigns a weighted average rating out of 100 to reviews from mainstream publications, the release received an average score of 70, based on 13 reviews.

== Track listing ==
No.	Title	Length
1.	"Make Up"	3:21
2.	"Now That I Miss Her"	2:37
3.	"Misfit"	3:14
4.	"Bokkie"	3:36
5.	"Tonight Let's Dance"	3:07
6.	"Static on Channel 4"	2:18
7.	"Sunlight Makes Me Paranoid"	4:19
8.	"Annie"	3:15
9.	"Love"	4:01
10.	"Ester"	2:49

== Charts ==
Chart performance for Sunlight Makes Me Paranoid
Chart	Peak position
French Albums (SNEP)	89
