= Firewood (album) =

Studio album by Witchcraft
- Released: July 8, 2005
- Genre: Occult rock Blues rock Hard rock Doom metal
- Length: 45:30
- Label: Rise Above Records; Candlelight Records; Leaf Hound Records
- Producer: Witchcraft

Witchcraft chronology
Witchcraft (2004)	Firewood (2005)	If Crimson Was Your Colour (2006)

Professional ratings
Review scores
Source	Rating
Allmusic	3.5/5 stars

Firewood is the second album from the Swedish occult rock band Witchcraft. The album was released in 2005 by Rise Above Records. At roughly 8:50 in to the last track "Attention!", there is a cover of the Pentagram song "When the Screams Come". The vinyl edition does not include "When the Screams Come", but does include a bonus track entitled "The Invisible". This track also appears on the Japanese version released by Leaf Hound Records.

== Track listing ==
1. "Chylde of Fire" (Pelander) – 2:50
2. "If Wishes Were Horses" (Pelander) – 3:16
3. "Mr Haze" (Pelander) – 3:41
4. "Wooden Cross (I Can't Wake the Dead)" (Pelander) – 4:46
5. "Queen of Bees" (Pelander) – 5:13
6. "Merlin's Daughter" (Pelander) – 1:32
7. "I See a Man" (Pelander) – 3:59
8. "Sorrow Evoker" (Pelander) – 5:44
9. "You Suffer" (Pelander) – 2:43
10. "The Invisible" (Pelander) – 4:59 (vinyl/Japan only bonus track)
11. "Attention!/When the Screams Come" (Pelander/Liebling) – 11:40
