= Sickoakes =

Postrock instrumental group based in Stockholm

- Origin: Nynäshamn, Stockholm, Sweden
- Genres: Post-rock, instrumental rock, ambient
- Years active: 1999–present
- Labels: Type, Mothertrucker
- Members: Mats Danielsson; Simon Spurrier; David Kraft; Erik Danielsson; Jacob Broms; Jonas Eng; Joel Samuelsson; Love Östlund
- Website: www.sickoakes.com

Sickoakes is an eight-piece post-rock instrumental group based in Stockholm, Sweden.

== History ==
In the early summer of 1999, David, Jonas, Mats and Simon started getting intimate with their guitars in an old candy factory. From this seed a whole new twist on music has sprouted and today Sickoakes consists of a, at most times, seven man strong orchestra playing instrumental, cinematic music best categorized under the genre of postrock. Since then, after some lineup additions, Sickoakes has been performing all around Europe, recording songs at Soylent Green Studios (Nynäshamn), and releasing them on a 12" split vinyl (with Audionom) and a countless number of single copy CD-Rs.

Their long-awaited full-length debut album Seawards got released on Type Records(UK) in 2006.

== Seawards ==
After the release of an early recording of 'Wedding Rings & Bullets in the Same Golden Shrine' on the Pleasedosomething net-label, Sickoakes released their debut album Seawards in 2006. They are currently recording their second full-length album.
