= 1997 in Wales =

- Centuries: 18th; 19th; 20th; 21st
- Decades: 1970s; 1980s; 1990s; 2000s; 2010s
- See also: List of years in Wales; Timeline of Welsh history 1997 in The United Kingdom England Scotland Elsewhere

This article is about the particular significance of the year 1997 to Wales and its people.

== Incumbents ==
- Secretary of State for Wales – William Hague (until 3 May); Ron Davies
- Archbishop of Wales – Alwyn Rice Jones, Bishop of St Asaph
- Archdruid of the National Eisteddfod of Wales – Dafydd Rowlands

== Events ==
- 15 January – Diana, Princess of Wales calls for an international ban on landmines.
- 21 January – Wales child abuse scandal: Over eighty people are named as child abusers in care homes in North Wales.
- March – Launch of the "Welsh Language in Chubut" project.
- 13 March – Launch of the Aberystwyth Centre for the Book.
- 1 May – In the UK general election, four female MPs are elected in Wales -- Julie Morgan, Ann Clwyd, Betty Williams and Jackie Lawrence. Lembit Öpik becomes MP for Montgomeryshire.
- 24 May – Robert Hardy officially opens the Judge's Lodging museum in Presteigne.
- 31 August – Newsreader Martyn Lewis announces the death of Diana, Princess of Wales.
- 1 September – The Prince of Wales flies to Paris to bring home the body of his ex-wife. Bodyguard Trevor Rees-Jones, the only survivor of the crash in which Diana died, remains in a critical condition.
- 6 September – At the funeral of the former Princess of Wales, her coffin is carried into Westminster Abbey by a contingent of Welsh Guards.
- 18 September – The referendum on Welsh devolution results in a narrow "Yes" vote.
- 13 October – First section of the restored Welsh Highland Railway (60 cm (2 ft) gauge) officially opens over 5 km (3 mi) of former standard gauge trackbed between Caernarfon and Dinas.
- date unknown
  - Alun Hoddinott receives the Glyndwr Award for an Outstanding Contribution to the Arts in Wales.
  - Bryn Euryn, an archaeological site near Colwyn Bay, is identified as the probable base of Cynlas Goch, a 6th-century king.
  - Cardiff Arms Park is demolished to make way for a new stadium.
  - Welsh Sheepdog Society is founded.
  - Jenny Pride becomes the first Welsh female to command a unit of the Royal Engineers.

== Arts ==
- Sir Harry Secombe suffers a stroke.
- October - The Red Violin festival is held for the first time in Cardiff.

=== Awards ===
- Glyndŵr Award – Alun Hoddinott
- National Eisteddfod of Wales – held in Bala
  - Chair – Ceri Wyn Jones, "Gwaddol"
  - Crown – Cen Williams, "Branwen"
  - Prose Medal – Angharad Tomos, Y Canol Llonydd
  - Gwobr Goffa Daniel Owen – Gwyneth Carey
  - Richard Burton Prize – Rhys ap Trefor
- Welsh Arts Council Book of the Year – Iwan Llwyd, Dan Ddylanwad (Under the Influence)

=== Books ===
- Rees Davies – The Revolt of Owain Glyn Dŵr
- Dai Jones – Fi Dai Sy' 'Ma
- Angharad Tomos – Wele'n Gwawrio
- Gerwyn Williams – Cydio’n Dynn

=== Music ===
- L'Héritage des Celtes, featuring Elaine Morgan – Finisterre
- Bryn Terfel makes his debut at La Scala as Figaro.

==== Albums ====
- Acrimony – Tumuli Shroomaroom
- Manic Street Preachers – Everything Live
- Stereophonics release their first album, Word Gets Around.
- Gorky's Zygotic Mynci – Barafundle
- Iwcs a Doyle – Edrychiad Cynta’

=== Film ===
- Ioan Gruffudd and Bernard Fox appear in the blockbuster Titanic.
- Michael Sheen stars in Wilde.
- Horror film Darklands is filmed in Port Talbot.

== Broadcasting ==
=== English-language television ===
- Visions of Snowdonia with Iolo Williams

=== Welsh-language television ===
- Ffermio
- Pam Fi Duw? starring Brian Hibbard
- Tylluan Wen starring John Ogwen
- Y Clwb Rygbi

== Sport ==
- BBC Wales Sports Personality of the Year – Scott Gibbs
- Boxing:
  - 11 October – Joe Calzaghe beats Chris Eubank to become the Super Middleweight World Champion.
  - 19 December – Barry Jones beats Wilson Palacio to become the WBO Super featherweight Champion.
- Cricket – Glamorgan win the County Championship.

== Births ==
- 3 January – Joe Morrell, footballer
- 23 January – Shaheen Jafargholi, singer and actor
- 22 March – Harry Wilson, footballer
- 24 March – George Thomas, footballer
- 15 May – Maisie Potter, snowboarder

== Deaths ==
- January – Alan Taylor, TV presenter, 72
- 10 March – Wilf Wooller, cricketer, rugby player, journalist and sports administrator, 84
- 2 June – Eddie Thomas, boxing champion and manager, 70
- 10 July – Ivor Allchurch, footballer, 67
- 16 July – Ron Berry, writer, 77
- 2 August – Rhydwen Williams, poet, novelist, and minister, 80
- 20 August – Bernard Cowey, Wales international rugby union player, 85
- 30 August – Gwilym Tilsley, poet and archdruid, 86
- 31 August (in Paris) – Diana, Princess of Wales, 36
- 22 September – George Thomas, 1st Viscount Tonypandy, former Speaker of the House of Commons, 88
- 6 November – Ray Daniel, footballer, 69
- 13 November – Alexander Cordell, novelist, 83
- 15 November – Alf Day, footballer, 90
- 16 November – Aubrey Edwards, cricketer, 79
- 28 December – Ronnie Williams, actor and comedian, 58
- date unknown
  - David Gwerfyl Davies, organist and composer
  - Reg Parker, footballer

== See also ==
- 1997 in Northern Ireland
