= Lansing-Dreiden =

- Origin: Miami, Florida / New York City, New York, United States
- Genres: Indie rock, synthpop, space rock
- Years active: 2000–present
- Labels: Kemado

Lansing-Dreiden is an American band and art collective founded in founded in Miami, Florida, and based in New York City.

Their body of work includes music, multimedia artwork (in the form of drawings, collages, sculpture and video), and the literary journal Death Notice. Rather than calling themselves a band, they prefer to be categorized as "a company that sees no distinction between art and commerce." (Seattle Weekly, Feb. 5, 2005)

The collective's first full-length record, The Incomplete Triangle, was self-released in 2003. Spin Magazine described it as "dreamy space rock... with a psychedelic metal twist." This was followed by an EP in 2004, A Sectioned Beam. The EP was praised by Time Out New York as "an airtight example of textbook pop perfection." Both titles were reissued by Kemado Records in 2004.

Lansing-Dreiden's most recent full length was The Dividing Island, released in 2006. A music video was released for the single "A Line You Can Cross," though the band performing in the video was not Lansing-Dreiden. 2006 also saw the release of D.I. By D.D., a remix album of The Dividing Island produced by Dazzle D.

While their music itself has been met with a fairly warm reception, the group has been criticized in the musical press for self-consciously cultivating an air of obscurity. Lansing-Dreiden have responded, in turn, that they are shy.

== Discography ==
- The Incomplete Triangle, LP, self-released 2003 (reissued by Kemado Records, 2004)
- A Sectioned Beam, EP, self-released 2004 (reissued by Kemado, 2004)
- The Dividing Island, LP, Kemado, 2006
- D.I. By D.D., remix LP, self-released, 2006
- Tri EP, self-released, 2008
