= Mind Control (Uncle Acid & the Deadbeats album) =

Studio album by Uncle Acid & the Deadbeats
- Released: 15 April 2013
- Recorded: October–November 2012
- Studios: Chapel Studios, Lincolnshire
- Length: 50:30
- Label: Rise Above
- Producer: Kevin Starrs

Uncle Acid & the Deadbeats chronology
Blood Lust (2012)	Mind Control (2013)	The Night Creeper (2015)

Mind Control is the third studio album by the English band Uncle Acid & the Deadbeats, released in the United Kingdom on 12 April 2013 and in North America on 14 May 2014. Following its release, the band toured with Black Sabbath in Europe.

== Reception ==
Professional ratings
Aggregate scores
Source	Rating
Metacritic	81/100
Review scores
Source	Rating
Classic Rock	4/5
NME	8/10
Pitchfork	6.8/10
The Skinny	4/5 stars
Spin	8/10

Mind Control received mostly positive reviews upon its release.

- Screamer Magazine gave the album a positive review, stating: "Anyone looking to frighten their MP3 player this year could do a lot worse than purchase this fine collection of nine fuzz-laden psychedelic trips that we know eerily as Mind Control."

== Track listing ==
All songs written by Kevin Starrs.

No.	Title	Length
1.	"Mt. Abraxas"	7:08
2.	"Mind Crawler"	4:21
3.	"Poison Apple"	4:13
4.	"Desert Ceremony"	5:09
5.	"Evil Love"	4:07
6.	"Death Valley Blues"	4:58
7.	"Follow the Leader"	6:28
8.	"Valley of the Dolls"	7:11
9.	"Devil's Work"	6:55

== Personnel ==
Personnel adapted from liner notes.

Uncle Acid & the Deadbeats

- Kevin Starrs – vocals, lead guitar
- Yotam Rubinger – vocals, guitar
- Dean Millar – bass guitar
- Thomas Mowforth – drums

Technical personnel

- Kevin Starrs – production, artwork
- Jim Spencer – engineering
- Fran Wheeldon – engineering
- Noel Summerville – mastering
- Ygor Lugosi – artwork
