= Wasteland (Uncle Acid & the Deadbeats album) =

Studio album by Uncle Acid & the Deadbeats
- Released: 12 October 2018
- Studios: Sunset Sound Recorders; The Overlook, Elstree
- Genres: Psychedelic rock: occult rock; doom metal
- Length: 46:26
- Label: Rise Above
- Producer: Kevin Starrs

Uncle Acid & the Deadbeats chronology
The Night Creeper (2015)	Wasteland (2018)	Nell' Ora Blu (2024)

Professional ratings
Aggregate scores
Source	Rating
Metacritic	83/100
Review scores
Source	Rating
Sputnikmusic	3.5/5

Wasteland is the fifth studio album by English heavy rock band Uncle Acid & the Deadbeats. It was released on 12 October 2018.

== Track listing ==
All tracks are written by Kevin Starrs.

No.	Title	Length
1.	"I See Through You"	5:41
2.	"Shockwave City"	4:00
3.	"No Return"	8:49
4.	"Blood Runner"	4:01
5.	"Stranger Tonight"	3:54
6.	"Wasteland"	7:46
7.	"Bedouin"	5:32
8.	"Exodus"	6:47

== Personnel ==
Personnel adapted from liner notes.

Uncle Acid & the Deadbeats

- Kevin Starrs – vocals, guitars, keyboard
- Vaughn Stokes – bassist
- Jon Rice – drums

Technical personnel

- Kevin Starrs – production, additional engineering and "Wall of Trash" mixing
- Geoff Neal – engineering
- Zachary Zajdel – assistant
- Noel Summerville – mastering
- Julian Montague – artwork
- Computarded – collages
