= Tumuli Shroomaroom =

- 2007 reissue cover on Leaf Hound Records

Studio album by Acrimony
- Released: 1997
- Recorded: 1–30 June 1996
- Studio: Square Centre Studios, Nottingham
- Genre: Doom metal, stoner rock
- Length: 65:28
- Label: Peaceville
- Producer: Andy Sneap

Acrimony chronology
The Acid Elephant (1995)	Tumuli Shroomaroom (1997)	Bong On – Live Long! (2007)

Alternative cover
- 2019 remastered edition.

Tumuli Shroomaroom is the second full-length studio album from Welsh stoner rock/doom band Acrimony. It was released in 1997 on Peaceville Records.

== Critical reception ==
Professional ratings
Review scores
Source	Rating
AllMusic	4.5/5 stars
Kerrang!	5/5 stars

AllMusic's Eduardo Rivadavia called it "of the all-time classic stoner rock albums ever" and also said that it "makes for remarkably immediate listening, unveiling its otherworldly glories to all those who dare enter the mushroom." Kerrang! gave the album a top mark five-Ks review. The album made it to the 1997 list of Kerrang! albums of the year. In 2019, Paul Travers from Kerrang! included the album as one of 16 essential rock and metal albums that still aren't on Spotify. He continued, "Tumuli Shroomaroom might or might not be what Boris Johnson shouts on climax, but it’s also another great underrated gem from the Brit stoner scene. Want fuzz? Riffs? Hip-shaking grooves? You'll find them here but you'll have to go and look for it.". Simon Young from the same magazine said that while Acrimony is still an underrated band, the album "Tumuli Shroomaroom remains a perfect record to play while firing up that skull-shaped bong".

In November 2019, Tumuli Shroomaroom was reissued as a 3CD digipack and remastered edition by the Dutch music label Burning World Records.

== Track listing ==
All music written by Acrimony; all lyrics written by Paul Bidmead and Dorian Walters.

1. "Hymns to the Stone" – 9:07
2. "Million Year Summer" – 4:49
3. "Turn the Page" – 1:45
4. "Vŷ" – 6:00
5. "Find the Path" – 4:07
6. "The Bud Song" – 4:57
7. "Motherslug (The Mother of All Slugs)" – 11:05
8. "Heavy Feather" – 9:59
9. "Firedance" – 13:17

== Personnel ==
- Dorian Walters – vocals
- Lee Davies – guitar
- Stuart O'Hara – guitar
- Paul "Mead" Bidmead – bass
- Darren Ivey – drums
