= Ogre (band) =

America heavy metal band

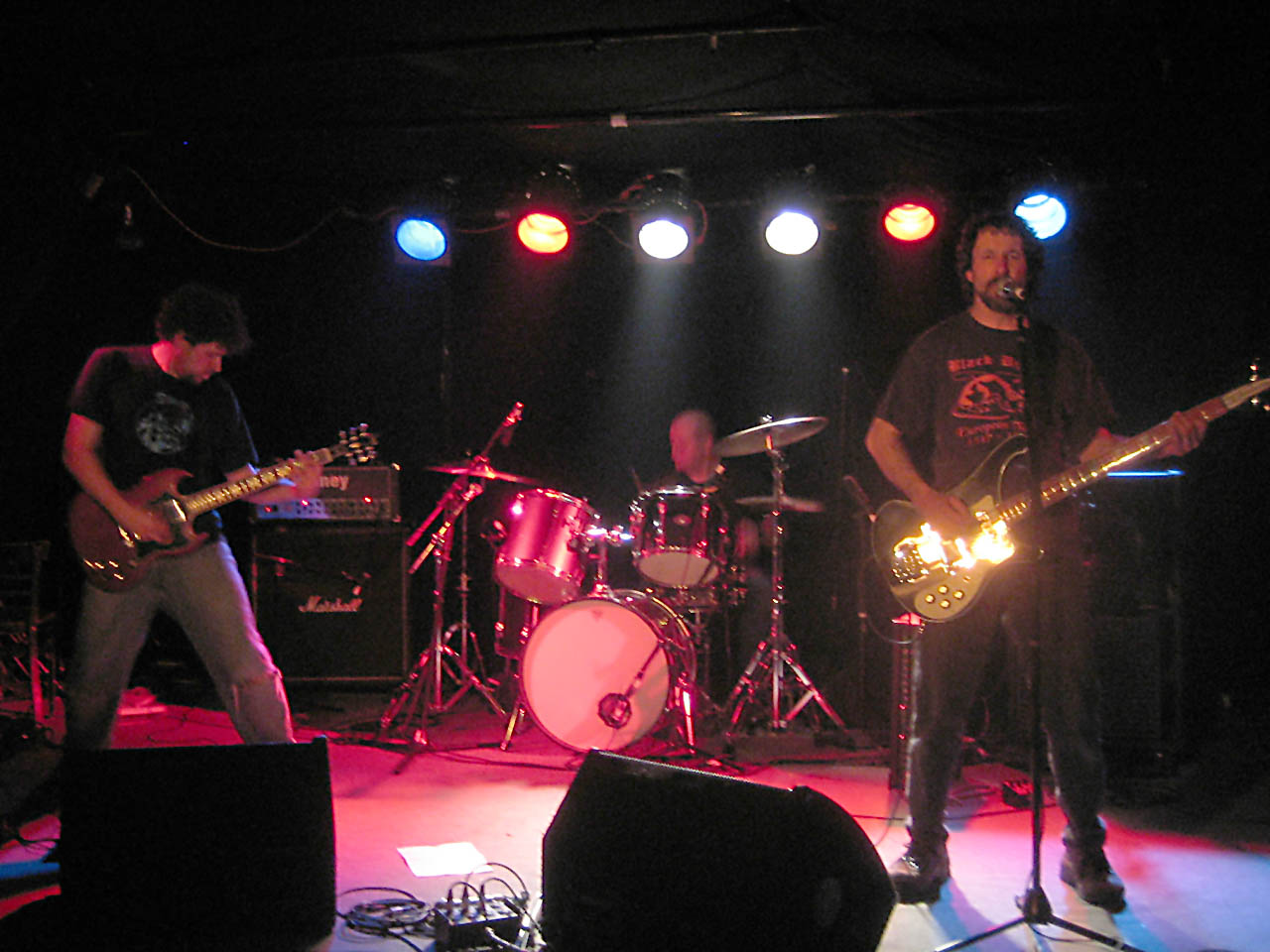

Background information
- Origin: Portland, Maine, USA
- Genres: Doom metal, heavy metal
- Years active: 1999–2009, 2012, 2013–present
- Labels: Wurmhole Records; Leaf Hound Records
- Members: Ed Cunningham; Will Broadbent; Ross Markonish
- Website: ogrerock.com

Ogre is an American heavy metal band from Portland, Maine.

== History ==
Ogre formed in 1999 when Ross Markonish and Will Broadbent grew tired of their current prog/drone/trance band, Hello Monster, and decided to start a 70s hard rock and heavy metal influenced project. They placed an ad in the local paper for a bassist/vocalist and were contacted by Ed Cunningham. In 2000 they released a six song demo, which led to their debut appearance on Water Dragon Records' Greatest Hits Vol. 1 (the same compilation which saw the debut of Swedish rockers Grand Magus). In 2003 Wurmhole Records released Ogre's debut album, Dawn of the Proto-Man. The band then signed to Japan's Leaf Hound Records for 2006's Seven Hells. Their third album, also on Leaf Hound, was released in 2008. It is entitled Plague of the Planet and consists of one long, multi-part, epic song. It was later rereleased by Shadow Kingdom Records, based out of Pennsylvania.

Ogre has announced that their 10th Anniversary show, set in their hometown of Portland, Maine for September 2009, will be a farewell for the band. However, some live shows may follow in Europe later in 2009 or early 2010. After their break-up, Will and Ross formed Dementia Five with whom they recorded an album, Revolt in the Fifth Dimension, which remained unreleased until April 2015. They reunited for one show in 2012, playing their first gig since the split-up at Geno's Rock Club in Portland, Maine together with Iron Man and Revelation on September 1.

== Line-up ==
- Ed Cunningham - vocals & bass
- Will Broadbent - drums
- Ross Markonish - guitar & synthesizer

== Discography ==
=== Albums ===
- Dawn of Proto-Man CD (2003 Wurmhole Records)
- Seven Hells CD (2006 Leaf Hound Records)
- Plague of the Planet CD (2008 Leaf Hound Records)
- The Last Neanderthal CD (2014 Minotauro Records)
- Thrice as Strong (2019 Cruz del Sur Music)

=== Compilation appearances ===
- "Ogre" and "Skeletonized" on Greatest Hits Vol. 1 CD (2000 Water Dragon Records)
- "Age of Ice" and "God of Iron" on Unleashed from the Northeast LP (2006 Swaying Ball Music)
- "The Centurion" on Short Songs from Long Fellows 7" (2007 Entertainment Experiment)
- "Plague of the planet on "Space Rock! (free with issue 139 of Classic Rock Magazine)
