= The Acid Elephant =

EP by Acrimony
- Released: 1995
- Recorded: 1995
- Studio: Sonic One, Kidwelly, Carmarthenshire
- Genre: Doom metal, stoner rock
- Length: 25:03
- Label: Godhead Recordings

Acrimony chronology
Hymns to the Stone (1994)	The Acid Elephant (1995)	Tumuli Shroomaroom (1997)

Professional ratings
Review scores
Source	Rating
AllMusic	3/5 stars

The Acid Elephant is an EP from the Welsh stoner rock/doom band Acrimony. It was released in 1995 on Godhead Recordings. It contains four songs, two of which were on their previous album Hymns to the Stone and two of which would be re-recorded for their next album Tumuli Shroomaroom. "Spaced Cat #7" is a remix of "Spaced Cat #6" with the addition of a Hammond organ and the sound of someone smoking a bong.

== Track listing ==
All music written by Stuart O'Hara, Darren Ivey, Lee Davies and Paul Bidmead; all lyrics written by Dorian Walters.

1. "Spaced Cat #7" (Hammond Moon – Bong mix) – 7:06
2. "The Inn" – 4:34
3. "The Bud Song" – 5:05
4. "Fire–Dance" (Live from Planet Urabalaboom) – 8:18

== Personnel ==
- Dorian Walters – vocals
- Lee Davies – lead and rhythm guitars
- Stuart O'Hara – lead and rhythm guitars
- Paul Bidmead – bass
- Darren Ivey – drums, percussion
