= Uncle Acid & the Deadbeats =

English rock band

Uncle Acid and the Deadbeats
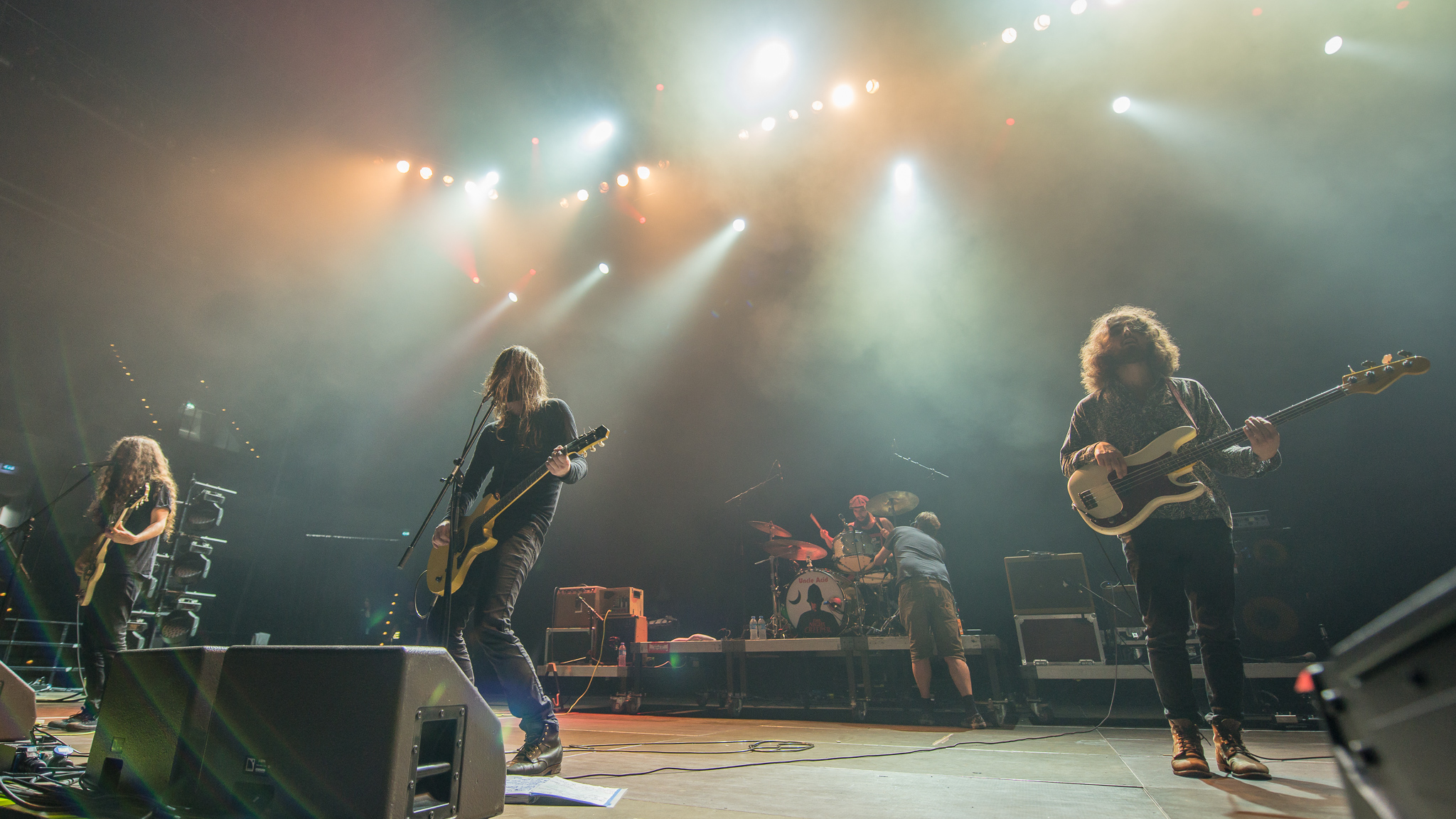
- Uncle Acid & the Deadbeats at Rock im Park 2016

Background information
- Also known as: The Sharon Tate Experience
- Origin: Cambridge, England
- Genres: Psychedelic rock; doom metal; stoner metal; occult rock; stoner rock
- Years active: 2009–present
- Labels: Rise Above; Metal Blade; Killer Candy
- Members: Kevin (K.R.) Starrs; Jon Rice; Justin Smith; George Hudson; Rachel Burnett
- Past members: Vaughn Stokes; Itamar Rubinger; Yotam Rubinger; Dean Millar; Thomas Mowforth; Kat; Red
- Website: uncleacidband.com

Uncle Acid & the Deadbeats (written as Uncle Acid and the deadbeats or simply Uncle Acid) are an English psychedelic rock and doom metal band formed in Cambridge by Kevin Starrs in 2009. The band has released six studio albums and one live album. Their most recent studio album Nell' Ora Blu, was released in May 2024 – as well as a number of singles. The band appears regularly at festivals around Europe.

== History and musical style ==
The band's music is heavily influenced by the late 1960s when heavy metal was emerging. AllMusic praised the band's ability to recreate a particular aspect of this era, describing the band as "celebrating the Summer of Love's soul-chilling autumn: a blasted landscape, post-flower power, resembling Altamont's killing fields, reeking of the Manson Family murders, and, naturally, sounding like a mish-mash of all of the apocalyptic musical forces that converged upon that era".

Their record label, Metal Blade Records, described the band as "the original Alice Cooper band jamming in a cell with early Black Sabbath and the Stooges". In order to replicate the sound of that era, the band uses vintage instruments and recording equipment.

The band's name was taken from Rusty Day, the singer of Cactus, who later had a band called Uncle Acid and the Permanent Damage Band. Uncle Acid was originally the otherwise-anonymous frontman, although he has since changed his stage name to K.R. Starrs and now views the band members collectively as being "Uncle Acid".

Blood Lust was the band's breakthrough album, with The Quietus describing it as "a glorious and idiosyncratic collection that quickly garnered rabid cult status amongst the worldwide doom fraternity" and Decibel Magazine referring to it as "a groovy, evil delight". AllMusic described Blood Lust as "a mixture of psychedelic rock's harrowing comedown, garage and punk rock's nihilistic ascent, and the earliest manifestations of heavy metal's occult-laced, nerve-damaging bludgeon". The album garnered substantial acclaim, for which K.R. Starrs remarked, "It kind of took everyone by surprise that the album took off the way it did".

With the release of the band's third album, Mind Control, more 1970s pop influences were incorporated into the music. A concept album, K.R. Starrs explained that Mind Control is a "fictional story ... about a cult leader who comes down from the mountain and brainwashes his desert disciples through drugs, love, violence, and intimidation". According to Metacritic, the album has received "universal acclaim" with a score of 81 based on seven critics. Justin Norton, writing for Decibel Magazine, awarded the album a score of eight out of 10 and described the album as "a perfect union of Sabbath riffs, fuzz and Herschell Gordon Lewis".

They are confirmed to be performing at the Hellfest music festival taking place in Clisson in June 2026.

== Band members ==
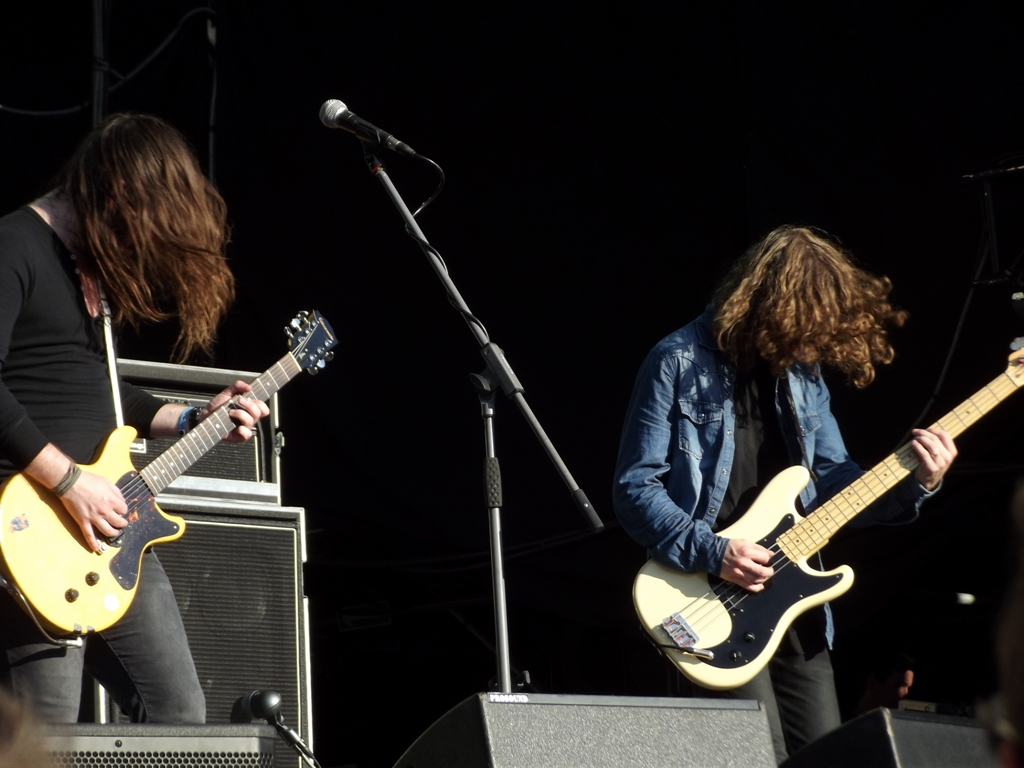
The band performing in 2013

Current members

- Kevin R. Starrs ("Uncle Acid") – lead guitar, lead vocals, organ (2009–present), rhythm guitar (2009–2012, 2017–2018)
- Jon Rice – drums (2018–present)
- Justin Smith – bass (2018–present)
- George Hudson — guitar (2024–present), backing vocals (2024–present)
- Rachel Burnett — keyboards (2024–present), backing vocals (2024–present)

Former members

- "Kat" – bass (2009–2011)
- "Red" – drums (2009–2011)
- Yotam Rubinger – rhythm guitar, backing vocals (2012–2017)
- Dean Millar – bass, backing vocals (2012–2015)
- Thomas Mowforth – drums (2012)
- Itamar Rubinger – drums (2013–2017)
- Vaughn Stokes – rhythm guitar (2018–2024), bass (2015–2018), backing vocals (2015–2024)

Timeline

== Discography ==
=== Albums ===
- VOL. 1 (2010)
- Blood Lust (2011)
- Mind Control (2013)
- The Night Creeper (2015)
- Wasteland (2018)
- Nell' Ora Blu (2024)
- Shapes of Midnight (2026)

=== Live albums ===
- Slaughter on First Avenue (2023)

=== Singles ===
- "White Nights of Murder" / "I'll Cut You Down" – split with Danava (2011)
- "Poison Apple" (2013)
- "Under the Spell" (2013)
- "Mind Crawler" (2013)
- "Sharon Tate Experience – Christmas Killer" (2013)
- "Down to the Fire" – Track 2 on Something in the Water – A Rise Above Compilation (2013)
- "Runaway Girls" (2014)
- "Waiting for Blood" (2015)
- "Melody Lane" (2015)
- "Pusher Man" / "Remember Tomorrow" (Iron Maiden cover) (2016)
- "Crystal Spiders" (2017)
- "Dead Eyes of London" (2017)
- "Stranger Tonight" (2018)
- "Shockwave City" (2018)
- "Dead Eyes of London" (live version) (2023)
- "Don't Let It Control You" (2026)
- "Shapes of Midnight" (2026)
- "House by the Grave" [2026]

== Tours ==
The band toured internationally during 2013 and 2014, and played at festivals including Roadburn, Download, Hellfest, Roskilde, Bukta Tromsø Open Air Festival, Montreaux Jazz Festival, Øya Festival, Valkhof, Beacons, Reading and Leeds Festivals, Off Festival and Soundwave. They supported Black Sabbath on 16 dates of their Reunion Tour in Europe in November and December 2013. After touring in New Zealand, Australia and Europe in early 2014, their schedule for 2014 included Maryland Deathfest, Nova Rock Festival, Eurockéennes, Copenhell and Pukkelpop festival.

Uncle Acid sold out 13 of 15 dates on their first-ever North American tour (supported by Danava) in September 2014.

Uncle Acid completed a European tour for their new album Nell'Ora Blu, starting on 16 January 2025 and ending on 31 January 2025. In this tour they visited Paris, Italy, Germany, the Netherlands, Belgium and London. Straight after, they started their North American tour on 5 February 2025 for the album, making their way from Virginia to Los Angeles, visiting 13 locations across Canada and the USA, ending their journey and tour on 22 February 2025.

As of 2026, Uncle Acid have announced an additional European tour, visiting France, Germany, Spain, Portugal, Belgium, and the Netherlands in June followed by Denmark and Croatia in July 2026. This is planned to be followed by a November tour of The United Kingdom which is planned to include cities like Glasgow, Leeds, Southampton, and Bristol.

In June 2026, it was announced that Uncle Acid would play 24 shows across North America, with Italian band, Messa, joining them on the tour as an opening act. In addition to coast to coast U.S. dates, they will play two dates in Canada. The tour began on September 8, 2026 in Charlotte, North Carolina, and is scheduled to conclude on October 11, 2026 in New York, New York.
