= Hymns to the Stone =

Studio album by Acrimony
- Released: 1994
- Recorded: 1994
- Studio: Sonic One, Kidwelly, Carmarthenshire
- Genre: Doom metal, stoner rock
- Length: 45:02
- Label: Godhead Recordings

Acrimony chronology
Solstice Sadness (1993)	Hymns to the Stone (1994)	The Acid Elephant (1995)

Alternative cover
- 2019 remastered edition

Hymns to the Stone is the first full-length studio album from Welsh stoner rock/doom band Acrimony. It was released in 1994 on Godhead Recordings. In November 2019, Hymns to the Stone was reissued as part of a 3-CD digipack and remastered edition by the Dutch music label Burning World Records.

== Critical reception ==
Professional ratings
Review scores
Source	Rating
AllMusic	2.5/5 stars

AllMusic's Eduardo Rivadavia gave the record 2.5 stars, and affirmed that "while fellow U.K. acts like Cathedral and Paradise Lost were bogging down compulsively into their fondness for monolithic, down-tuned Black Sabbath riffs, Acrimony had more in common with American groups like Monster Magnet, Fu Manchu, and Kyuss, whose influences also included elements of psych, acid, and space rock. [...] Also, much like Kyuss, Magnet, and other template-making contemporaries, when Acrimony weren't getting high and dropping out, they liked to launch into extended space rock jams like "Whatever," "Cosmic A.W.O.L.," and the excellent "Spaced Cat #6"."

Reviewing the 2019 reissue, J.J. Koczan from The Obelisk reflected also on the importance of the album for the U.K. heavy underground rock scene: "The overarching sound of Hymns to the Stone shows some of its age these 25 years after the fact, but that hardly makes it less righteous. The guitars of Stu O'Hara and Lee Davies, Paul Bidmead's bass and Darren Ivey's drums managed to take some influence from the grunge that was saturating the US at the time, meld it with their own history in metal, and add more than a flourish of Sabbathian undertones — looking at you, "Spaced Cat #6" — and create something new from it. And they were legitimately right there at the start. Cathedral had embraced something of a rocking side with their 1993 sophomore outing, The Ethereal Mirror, but Acrimony took even that to a new level entirely. Consider that Orange Goblin were just getting together at the time, and Electric Wizard as well. Consider that Hymns to the Stone came out the same year as Welcome to Sky Valley. Acrimony were a nexus band. They helped craft the direction the UK heavy underground would take as it moved into the mid '90s and beyond, and their impact can still be felt today in swaths of bands in the UK and out."

== Track listing ==
All music written by Stuart O'Hara, Darren Ivey, Lee Davies and Paul Bidmead; all lyrics written by Dorian Walters.

1. "Leaves of Mellow Grace" – 5:48
2. "The Inn"– 4:34
3. "Second Wind" – 5:36
4. "Spaced Cat #6" – 6:37
5. "Urabalaboom" – 4:23
6. "Herb" – 3:21
7. "Magical Mystical Man" – 3:08
8. "Whatever" – 7:02
9. "Cosmic A.W.O.L." – 4:33

== Personnel ==
- Dorian Walters – vocals
- Lee Davies – rhythm and acoustic guitars
- Stuart O'Hara – lead, rhythm and acoustic guitars
- Paul Bidmead – bass
- Darren Ivey – drums, percussion
