= Slices (band) =

American hardcore punk band

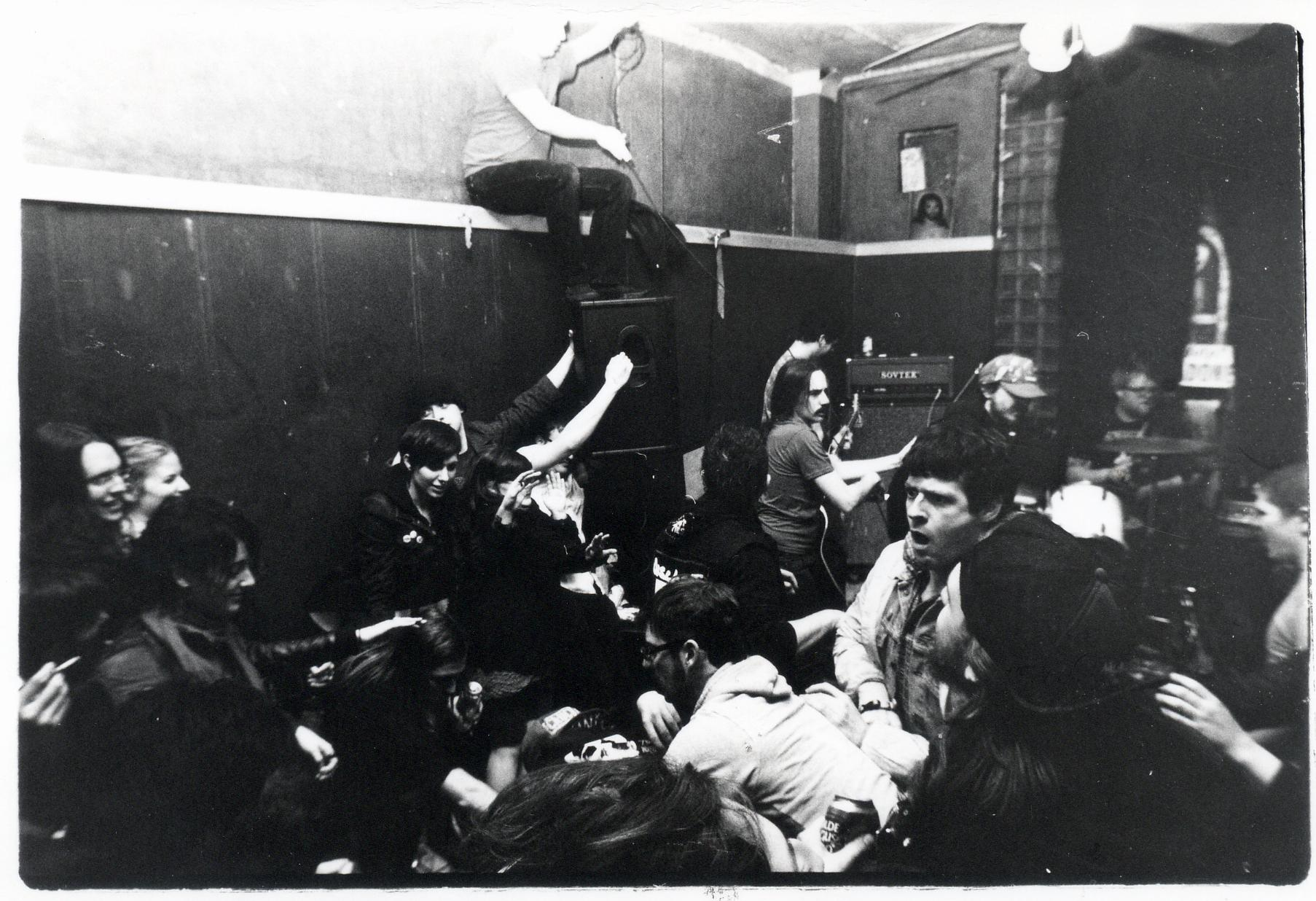

Background information
- Origin: Pittsburgh, Pennsylvania, United States
- Genres: Punk, hardcore, noise rock
- Years active: 2004–present
- Labels: Iron Lung Records; Kemado Records; Home Invasion Records
- Members: John Kasunic; Mike Kasunic; Greg Kamerdze; Mike Ovens

Slices is a hardcore punk band from Pittsburgh, Pennsylvania. The band includes lead vocalist Greg Kamerdze, guitarist John Kasunic, bassist Mike Kasunic, and drummer Mike Ovens. Formed as a duo in 2004 by brothers John Kasunic and Mike Kasunic, the band has released music on Iron Lung Records, Kemado Records, and Home Invasion Records.

== Discography ==
=== LPs ===
- Cruising (Iron Lung Records, 2010)
- Still Cruising (Iron Lung Records, 2012)

=== EPs ===
- Untitled (16OH Records, 2009)
- Untitled (Home Invasion Records, 2009)
- Modern Bride/Chump Change (Kemado Records, 2011)
