= Legend (Witchcraft album) =

Studio album by Witchcraft
- Released: 25 September 2012
- Genres: Doom metal, hard rock, alternative rock
- Length: 51:31 (56:42 with bonus track)
- Label: Nuclear Blast Records
- Producer: Jens Bogren

Witchcraft chronology
The Sword/Witchcraft split (2007)	Legend (2012)	Nucleus (2016)

Professional ratings
Review scores
Source	Rating
AllMusic	3.5/5 stars
About.com	4/5 stars
Decibel Magazine	9/10 stars

Legend is the fourth album by the Swedish occult rock band Witchcraft. It was released 25 September 2012 through Nuclear Blast Records. The album marked the debut of three new members: Simon Solomon (guitar), Tom Jondelius (guitar), and Oscar Johansson (drums). Singer Magnus Pelander opted to focus on vocals and, as a result, Legend is the first Witchcraft album on which he does not play guitar as well as sing. Bassist Ola Henriksson noted that "Magnus has been wanting to drop the guitar for a couple of years now, and just focus on the vocals. When we found two new guitar players, it was an easy decision for him to do that." Critics observed that the album departed from the band's vintage production values and opted for a more modern-sounding production.

== Track listing ==
1. "Deconstruction" – 5:09
2. "Flag of Fate" – 4:35
3. "It's Not Because of You" – 4:13
4. "An Alternative to Freedom" – 5:17
5. "Ghosts House" – 4:17
6. "White Light Suicide" – 5:16
7. "Democracy" – 3:48
8. "Dystopia" – 6:46
9. "Dead End" – 12:10
10. "By Your Definition" – 5:11 (bonus track)
