= Danava (album) =

Studio album by Danava
- Released: October 31, 2006
- Studio: Suite 304 Studios
- Genre: Psychedelic rock
- Length: 44:52
- Label: Kemado Records
- Producer: Johnny Jewel

Professional ratings
Review scores
Source	Rating
AllMusic	3.5/5 stars
Pitchfork	6.6/10
Blabbermouth	6.5/10

Danava is the debut album released by psychedelic rock band Danava. It was released on October 31, 2006 by Kemado Records on CD and LP.

== Track listing ==
1. "By the Mark" – 7:49
2. "Eyes in Disguise" – 12:53
3. "Quiet Babies Astray in a Manger" – 6:19
4. "Longdance" – 7:59
5. "Maudie Shook" – 9:53

== Personnel ==
- Dusty Sparkles - guitars, vocals, synthesizers
- Dell Blackwell - bass
- Buck Rothy - drums
