= Witchcraft (Witchcraft album) =

Studio album by Witchcraft
- Released: 2004
- Genre: Occult rock, hard rock, doom metal
- Length: 41:03
- Label: Rise Above Records; The Music Cartel; Leaf Hound Records
- Producer: Witchcraft & Jens Henriksson

Witchcraft chronology
| No Angel or Demon (2002) | Witchcraft (2004) | Firewood (2005) |

Professional ratings
Review scores
| Source | Rating |
|---|---|
| Allmusic | 4/5 stars |

Witchcraft is the debut album from the Swedish occult rock band Witchcraft. The album was released in 2004 by Rise Above Records. "Please Don't Forget Me" and "Yes I Do" are both covers of 70s-era Pentagram. "Yes I Do" appears on the original LP version and the Japanese press; it does not appear on the picture disc. "Please Don't Forget Me" is credited to Bobby Liebling on the sleeve and is often mis-accredited to Liebling's pre-Pentagram outfit, Stone Bunny. The cover image is a slightly altered version of a print called Merlin, a woodblock print illustration by Aubrey Beardsley for an 1893-94 edition of Sir Thomas Malory's Le Morte d'Arthur. Additionally, the band formed to be a one-off tribute band to both Bobby Liebling and Roky Erickson and only intended to make one song (No Angel or Demon) however, they continued and are now an original band.

== Track listing ==
1. "Witchcraft" – 6:00
2. "The Snake" – 2:48
3. "Please Don't Forget Me" (Liebling) – 2:13
4. "Lady Winter" – 2:58
5. "What I Am" – 3:45
6. "Schyssta lögner" – 1:57
7. "No Angel or Demon" – 3:28
8. "I Want You to Know" – 3:16
9. "It's So Easy" – 3:53
10. "You Bury Your Head" – 4:40
11. "Her Sisters They Were Weak" – 6:00
12. "Yes I Do" (Liebling) – 2:34 (Vinyl & Japan-only bonus track)
