= Elefant (band) =

American indie rock band

- Origin: New York City, United States
- Genres: Post-punk revival, indie rock
- Years active: 2002–2010
- Label: Kemado • Hollywood
- Past members: Diego Garcia (lead vocals, keyboard); Kevin McAdams (drums); Mod (lead guitar, rhythm guitar); Jeff Berrall (bass guitar, triangle, organ)

Elefant was an indie rock band from New York City that released two albums in the 2000s.

== Band members ==
- Diego Garcia – vocals
- James Ascuitto aka Mod – guitar
- Jeff Berrall – bass
- Keven McAdams – drums

== Background ==
Born in Detroit to Argentine parents in the late 1970s, Diego Garcia immersed himself in the sounds of Iggy Pop and MC5 at an early age. Music carried him throughout his tenure until his cardiologist father moved the family back to Tampa, Florida when Garcia was a young teenager, and by age 14 he got himself an acoustic guitar and started writing songs. As Garcia approached college life at Brown University in 1996, music was still calling him despite his course load in economics. During his junior year, Garcia realized he wanted a career in music instead. He left for New York City upon his 2000 graduation and began to look for musicians, eventually playing with the band Circus for a brief time. A year later, Garcia formed Elefant with bassist Jeff Berrall, guitarist Mod, and drummer Kevin McAdams.

== Career ==
Along with bands such as Interpol, Elefant was involved in the indie rock scene in New York City in the 2000s. They signed with Kemado Records in 2002. Their debut EP Gallery Girl was released on February 4, 2003. Their full-length debut, Sunlight Makes Me Paranoid, was released on April 8, 2003, and included the single "Misfit".

After the success of Sunlight Makes Me Paranoid, Elefant signed with Hollywood Records. The album was re-released on Hollywood in October 2004. The band's second album, The Black Magic Show, was released on April 18, 2006. It was made with a bigger budget than their first and signified a change in the band's style, featuring dance rhythms and hard rock guitars.

== Breakup ==
After recording The Black Magic Show, the band went on a hiatus. They officially broke up in June 2010, as announced on their MySpace page. No reason was given for the breakup. Garcia then embarked on a solo career. Jeff Berrall went on to play in Caveman. Mod went on to playing and producing in projects such as Ape Fight.

== Discography ==
- Gallery Girl (EP) (2003)
- Sunlight Makes Me Paranoid (LP) (2003)
- Now That I Miss Her (7") (2004)
- Misfit (7") (2004)
- The Black Magic Show (LP) (2006)
- Lolita (7") (2006)
