= The Night Creeper =

Studio album by Uncle Acid & the Deadbeats
- Released: 4 September 2015
- Studio: Toe Rag Studios, London; The Overlook, Elstree
- Length: 53:41
- Label: Rise Above
- Producer: Kevin Starrs

Uncle Acid & the Deadbeats chronology
Mind Control (2013)	The Night Creeper (2015)	Wasteland (2018)

The Night Creeper is the fourth studio album by English band Uncle Acid & the Deadbeats. The album released on 4 September 2015. The songs tell the story of a Jack the Ripper-style serial killer.

== Reception ==
Professional ratings
Aggregate scores
Source	Rating
Metacritic	71/100
Review scores
Source	Rating
Consequence of Sound	B
The Guardian	4/5 stars
Revolver	4/5
Sputnikmusic	2.8/5

The Night Creeper received generally positive reviews from critics.

== Track listing ==
All songs written by Kevin Starrs except "The Night Creeper", co-written by Dean Millar.

No.	Title	Length
1.	"Waiting for Blood"	4:54
2.	"Murder Nights"	5:13
3.	"Downtown"	4:21
4.	"Pusher Man"	5:39
5.	"Yellow Moon"	3:46
6.	"Melody Lane"	5:54
7.	"The Night Creeper"	6:11
8.	"Inside"	3:40
9.	"Slow Death"	9:19
10.	"Black Motorcade (hidden song)"	4:44

== Personnel ==
Personnel adapted from liner notes.

Uncle Acid & the Deadbeats

- Kevin Starrs – vocals, lead guitar, bass, keyboard, organ
- Yotam Rubinger – guitars
- Itamar Rubinger – drums

Additional musicians

- Chantal Brown – backing vocals on "Downtown" and "Pusher Man"

Technical personnel

- Kevin Starrs – production, engineering, artwork
- Liam Watson – engineering
- Luke Oldfield – engineering
- Noel Summerville – mastering
- Jay Shaw – artwork
- Ygor Lugosi – artwork
