= The Fever (band) =

New York City-based indie rock band

- Origin: New York City
- Genres: Indie rock
- Years active: 2001–2006
- Labels: Kemado Records

The Fever was an American indie rock band from New York City.

== History ==
The Fever formed in 2001 around songwriting partners Geremy Jasper (vocals) and Chris Sanchez (guitar). After expanding to a five-piece, the group signed with Kemado Records, releasing their debut EP, Pink on Pink, in 2002. The full-length, Red Bedroom followed in 2003, as did touring with bands such as Hot Hot Heat, Death From Above 1979, Moving Units, VHS or Beta, Metric, and the Kills. After the departure of guitarist Sanchez, the band regrouped the remaining original members as a four-piece with Keith Stapleton switching from bass to guitar, followed by the 2006 release, In the City of Sleep, but disbanded soon after in the fall of that year.

== Members ==
- Geremy Jasper: vocals
- Chris Ruggiero (Sanchez Esquire): guitar (2001–2004)
- Keith Stapleton (Pony): bass (2001–2004) & guitar (2004–2006)
- Achilles Tzoulafis: drums
- J. Ruggiero: organ

== Discography ==
- Pink on Pink EP (Kemado, 2002)
- Ladyfingers/ Glamorous Life Remix 12" Vinyl (Kemado, 2003)
- Red Bedroom (Kemado, 2004)
- Bridge & Tunnel/ The Slow Club 7" Vinyl UK only (Kemado, 2005)
- Red Room: Jasper vs. Sanchez Remixes 12" Vinyl (Kemado, 2005)
- Minotour EP Tour EP (Kemado 2006)
- In the City of Sleep (Kemado, 2006)

== Videography ==
- 2004: Gray Ghost [Directed by Hunter Gatherer]
- 2005: Ladyfingers [Directed by Josh & Xander]
- 2006: Waiting for the Centipede [Directed by Geremy Jasper & Johanna Witherby]

== Appearance in the Media ==
- The song "Ladyfingers" is in the movies Shortbus.
- The Fever were the musical guest on Last Call with Carson Daly on September 10, 2004. They performed "Ladyfingers" & "Gray Ghost".
- The song "Eyes on the Road" appears on the soundtrack of Rockstar Games Midnight Club: Los Angeles.
