= Witchcraft (band) =

Swedish rock band

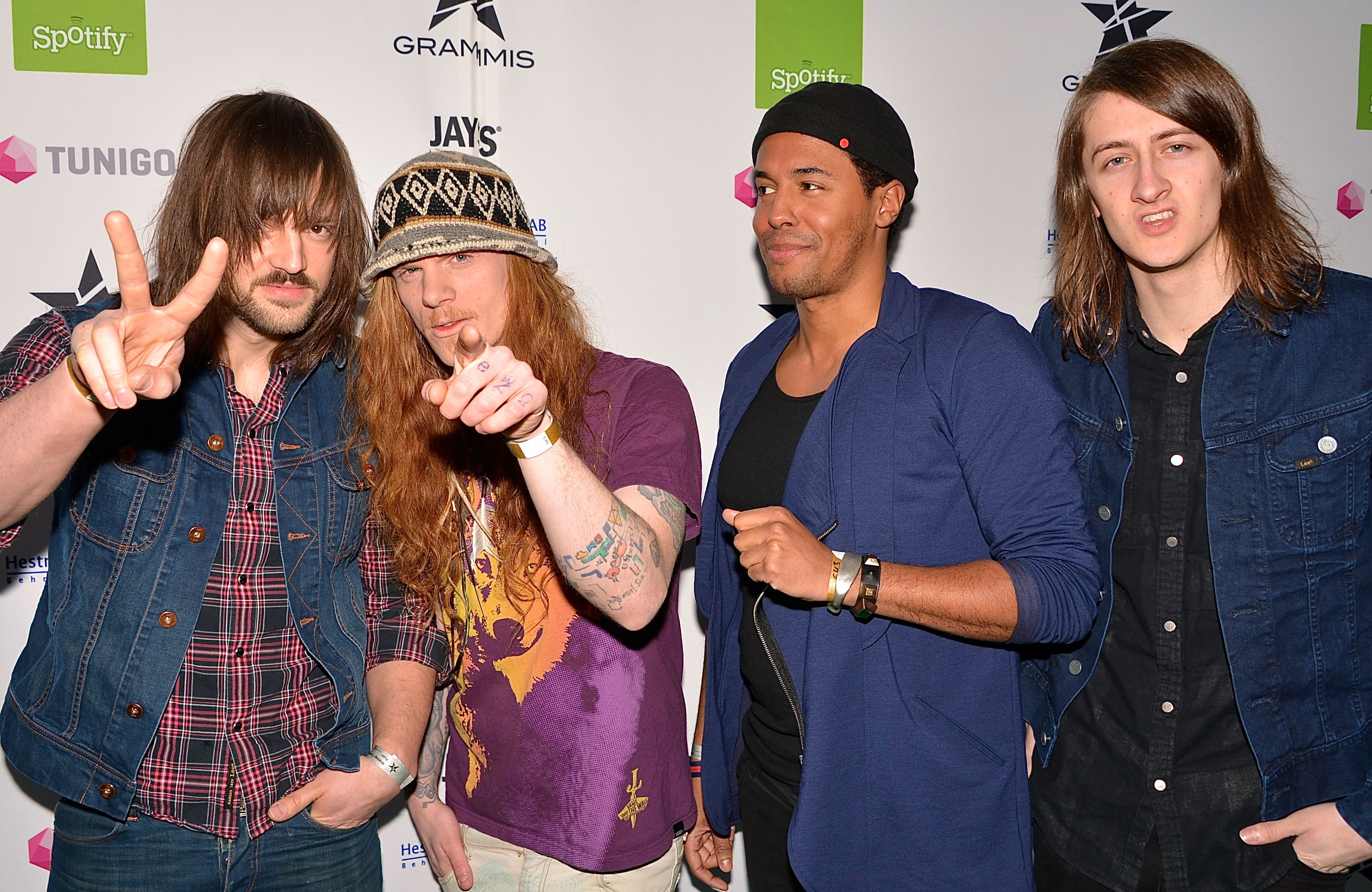
- Witchcraft in 2013

Background information
- Origin: Örebro, Sweden
- Genres: Occult rock, doom metal, hard rock
- Years active: 2000–present
- Label: Nuclear Blast
- Members: Magnus Pelander; Ida Elin Tannerdal; Johan "Jussi" Kalla
- Past members: Ola Henriksson; Simon Solomon; Tom Jondelius; Oscar Johansson; Jonas Arnesén; Jens Henriksson; Fredrik Jansson; John Hoyles; Mats Arnesén
- Website: Nuclear Blast page

Witchcraft is a Swedish occult rock band founded in 2000.

== History ==
=== Formation (2000–2003) ===
Magnus Pelander (formerly of Norrsken) formed Witchcraft in 2000 in order to record a tribute to Pentagram's Bobby Liebling and Roky Erickson. The "No Angel or Demon" single was released in 2002 by Primitive Art Records, which caught the attention of Lee Dorrian's label Rise Above Records, who quickly signed them. A year later, the band were brought back together with Jonas Arnesén taking the place of original drummer Jens Henriksson, and his brother Mats taking Ola's place on the bass.

=== Debut album Witchcraft (2004) and Firewood (2005) ===
Their debut album, Witchcraft (2004), was worked on in a basement studio with vintage equipment, which gave them their very seventies-esque sound. Mats Arnesén left the band almost immediately after the recording was done. Arnesén was also the drummer in the surf trio "The Hollywoods" and 50s style rockers "Eva Eastwood and the Major Keys". In mid-2004, the band toured Europe with Orange Goblin and Grand Magus.

The band recorded their second album, Firewood, in England, which was released on Rise Above in 2005. That same year the band toured the UK in support of Corrosion of Conformity, backed by the "Chylde of Fire" single.

=== Departure of Arnesén and Henriksson and The Alchemist (2006–2011) ===
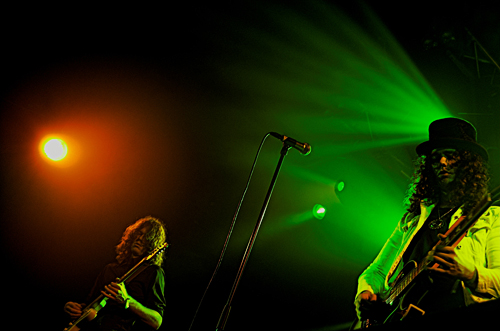
Live at Hole in the Sky, Norway, 2006

In mid-2006, Jonas Arnesén left the band and was replaced by original drummer, Jens Henriksson. The band toured the US in latter part of 2006 with Danava. During this tour, on 11 November 2006, Witchcraft performed at the Rock and Roll Hotel in Washington, D.C. For their encore they played Pentagram covers ("When the Screams Come" and "Yes I Do") with Bobby Liebling on vocals.

Following their US tour they returned to the studio and recorded the single "If Crimson Was Your Colour". This was released on 7-inch vinyl by Rise Above on 6 November 2006. Following the single Jens Henriksson once again left Witchcraft and was replaced by Fredrik Jansson (formerly of Abramis Brama).

Their third album, The Alchemist, was released on 8 October 2007 by Rise Above Records (UK), Leaf Hound Records (Japan), and Candlelight Records (US). Shortly after The Alchemist, Witchcraft released a split 12" with The Sword on Kemado Records. The EP features versions of two previously banned in Sweden songs. They then played the front stage on the one-day Ozzfest 2009.

In 2010 Magnus Pelander released a four track solo EP via Svart Records and is currently working on the solo full-length album. Current member Ola Henriksson along with former members John Hoyles and Jens Henriksson formed a new band called Troubled Horse and released a 7" single in early 2010. John Hoyles is also in a band with the drummer of Graveyard called Spiders. Jens Henriksson is also in The Wait a band with Joakim Dimberg, bass player for Dead Man.

=== New label and Legend (2012–2014) ===
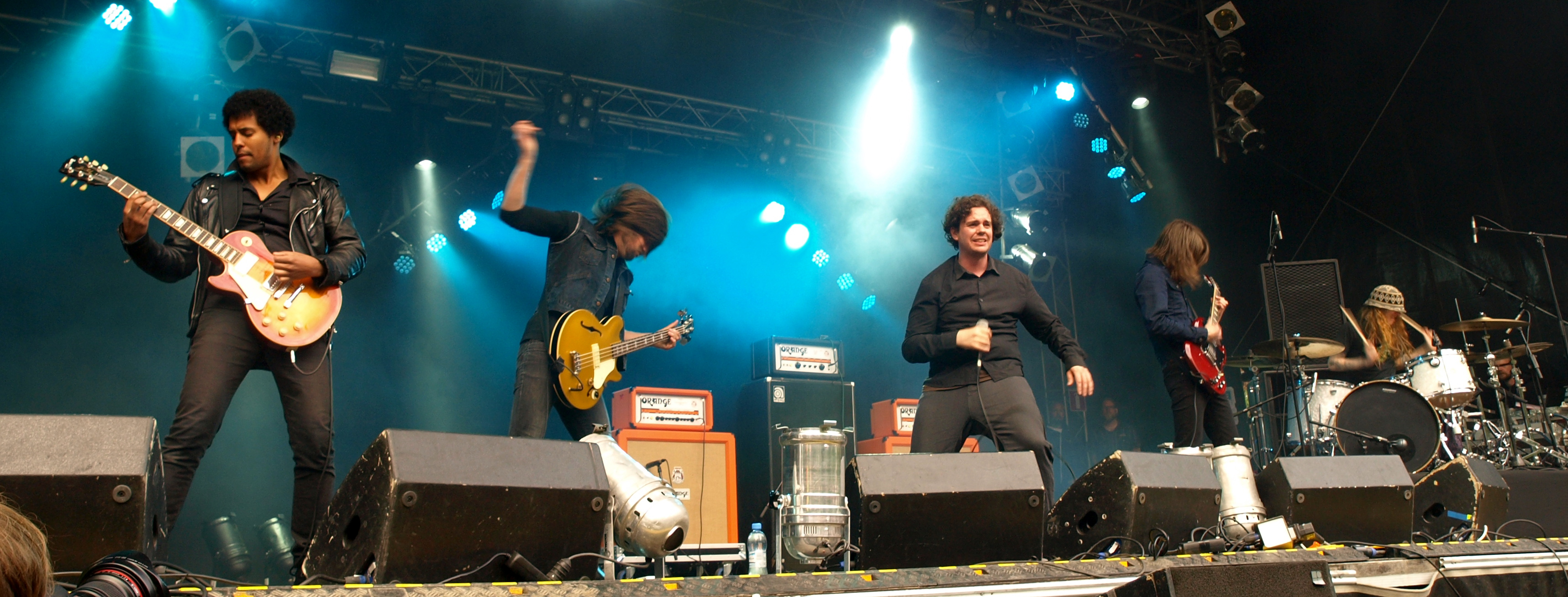
Witchcraft performing in 2013

In May 2012, the band announced that they had signed with Nuclear Blast Records. Their fourth studio album, Legend, was released in September 2012.

The new album marked the recording debut of the band's new members, including Simon Solomon (guitar), Tom Jondelius (guitar), and Oscar Johansson (drums) formerly of TruckFighters, with singer Magnus Pelander focusing only on vocals instead of both vocals and guitar.

The new album was released on double vinyl, with a special edition purple vinyl limited to 250 hand numbered copies.

=== Nucleus (2015–2019) ===
Witchcraft released their fifth studio album Nucleus worldwide on 15 January 2016 via Nuclear Blast Records.

=== Black Metal (2020) ===
In early 2020 Witchcraft released their sixth album, Black Metal via Nuclear Blast Records. Contrary to the name of the album, it exclusively features acoustic music of a more somber and bleak tone than most of Witchcraft's other work. The album seems to exclusively show the work of Magnus Pelander, performing both the vocals and lone acoustic guitar.

=== Idag (2025–present) ===
After a 5 year hiatus it was announced Witchcraft had signed with Heavy Psych Sounds for a new album and an EP release. Founding guitarist/vocalist, Magnus Pelander, says of 'IDAG': "This album will reap souls and destroy wicked minds. And perhaps mend a couple of broken ones."

These enigmatic few words from the Swedish band's main songwriter give clues as to the songs' intentions; a reference dropped to Coven's 1969 album, 'Witchcraft Destroys Minds and Reaps Souls.' Coven also had a folkish, proto-doomed take at that point in their history, and that multifaceted nature has been a part of Witchcraft all along. On one level, Magnus is winkingly telling you it's a Witchcraft record. The actual meaning of that becomes clear when you hear the album and find out just how much 'a Witchcraft record' can encompass. 'Idag' their 7th studio album will be released on 23 May 2025. They released the first single 'Burning Cross' on 18 February via Decibel Magazine.

== Musical style ==
The band's musical style varies between traditional doom metal in the style of Pentagram and hard rock. Depending on the release, further influences from rock music, especially psychedelic rock and progressive rock, can be heard.

== Band members ==
=== Current members/live band ===
- Magnus Pelander – vocals, guitar (2000–present)
- Ida Elin Tannerdal – bass (2020-present)
- Johan "Jussi" Kalla – drums (2020–present)

=== Former members ===
- Ola Henriksson – bass (2000–2003; 2004–2015)
- Jens Henriksson – drums (2000–2003; 2006)
- John Hoyles – guitar (2000–2012)
- Mats Arnesén – bass (2003–2004)
- Jonas Arnesén – drums (2003–2006)
- Fredrik Jansson – drums (2006–2012)
- Simon Solomon – guitar (2012–2015)
- Tom Jondelius – guitar (2012–2015)
- Oscar Johansson – drums (2012–2015)
- Jon Vegard Naess – guitar (2017–2020)
- Eirik Naess – guitar (2017–2020)
- Vegard Liverod – bass (2017–2020)
- Anders Langset – drums (2017–2020)

== Discography ==
=== Studio albums ===
- Witchcraft CD/LP (Rise Above Records 2004)
- Firewood CD/LP (Rise Above Records 2005)
- The Alchemist CD/LP (Rise Above Records 2007)
- Legend CD/LP (Nuclear Blast 2012)
- Nucleus CD/LP (Nuclear Blast 2016)
- Black Metal CD/LP (Nuclear Blast 2020)
- Idag CD/LP (Heavy Psych Sounds 2025)

=== Singles/EPs ===
- "No Angel or Demon" (Primitive Art Records 2002)
- "Chylde of Fire" split w/ Circulus (Rise Above Records 2005)
- "If Crimson Was Your Colour" (Rise Above Records 2006)
- Split 12" EP with The Sword (Kemado Records 2007)
- "It's Not Because of You" (Nuclear Blast Records 2012)
- "The Outcast" (Nuclear Blast Records 2015)
- "Elegantly Expressed Depression" (Nuclear Blast Records 2020)

=== Compilation tracks ===
- "Queen of Bees (live)" on Invaders (Kemado Records 2006)
- "Sweet Honey Pie" on Scandinavian Friends, a Tribute to Roky Erickson (Fat People Are Harder to Kidnap Records 2007)
