= The Alchemist (Witchcraft album) =

Studio album by Witchcraft
- Released: October 8, 2007
- Genres: Stoner rock hard rock blues rock doom metal
- Labels: (European Union) Rise Above Records (United States) Candlelight Records (Japan) Leaf Hound Records
- Producer: Tom Hakava

Witchcraft chronology
If Crimson Was Your Colour (2006)	The Alchemist (2007)	The Sword/Witchcraft split (2007)

Professional ratings
Review scores
Source	Rating
Allmusic	3.5/5 stars
Pitchfork Media	(5.8/10)

The Alchemist is the third album from the Swedish rock band Witchcraft. The album was released in 2007 by Rise Above Records. The Japanese version (released on Leaf Hound Records) contains the bonus track "Sweet Honey Pie" by Roky Erickson, which originally appeared on Scandinavian Friends: A Tribute to Roky Erickson.

== Track listing ==
1. "Walk Between the Lines" - 3:24
2. "If Crimson Was Your Colour" - 3:47
3. "Leva" - 4:33
4. "Hey Doctor" - 5:12
5. "Samaritan Burden" - 6:27
6. "Remembered" - 5:14
7. "The Alchemist (parts 1, 2 & 3)" - 14:38
8. "Sweet Honey Pie" (Erickson) - 3:00 (Japan-only bonus track)

== Personnel ==
=== Witchcraft ===
- Magnus Pelander - vocals, electric guitar
- John Hoyles - electric and acoustic guitar
- Ola Henriksson - bass
- Fredrik Jansson - drums, percussion

=== Additional musicians ===
- Tom Hakava - mellotron, wersi, upright piano, pump organ, and percussion
- Anders Andersson - saxophone

== Production ==
- Produced, Engineered & Mixed By Tom Hakava
- Mastered By Bjorn Engelmann at Cutting Room Studios
- Original artwork and design by David V. D’Andrea
