= The Dividing Island =

The Dividing Island is the second full-length album by Lansing-Dreiden. It was released in 2006.

Pitchfork observed the influence of English electronic band OMD.

== Track listing ==
Side A
No.	Title	Length
1.	"Dividing Island"	5:39
2.	"Cement to Stone"	3:33
3.	"A Line You Can Cross"	3:31
4.	"One For All"	4:07

Side B
No.	Title	Length
5.	"Two Extremes"	3:46
6.	"Part of the Promise"	3:36
7.	"Our Next Breath"	3:55
8.	"Our Hour"	3:01
9.	"Symbol of Symmetry"	2:22
10.	"Dethroning the Optimyth"	3:18
Total length:		36:48
