= The Incomplete Triangle =

Studio album by Lansing-Dreiden
- Released: April 6, 2004
- Label: Kemando

The Incomplete Triangle is the debut album by Lansing-Dreiden. It was released on April 6, 2004. It is a mix of various genres, divided into three parts of 4 songs each (hence the name of the LP). The first section of the album is the most rock-based, touching on garage rock and proto-punk among other styles. The middle section slows down the music a little with dream pop, ambient, post-punk and Britpop. The third and final section brings the energy back with late 80s/early 90s style synthpop.

== Track listing ==
Side A
| No. | Title | Length |
|---|---|---|
| 1. | "Metal on a Gun" | 3:47 |
| 2. | "The Eternal Lie" | 3:51 |
| 3. | "An Uncut Diamond" | 2:46 |
| 4. | "The Advancing Flags" | 6:23 |

Side B
| No. | Title | Length |
|---|---|---|
| 5. | "The Missing Message" | 3:55 |
| 6. | "A Silent Agreement" | 6:12 |
| 7. | "Laid in Stone" | 5:59 |
| 8. | "An Effect of the Night" | 4:02 |

Side C
| No. | Title | Length |
|---|---|---|
| 9. | "Glass Corridor" | 4:31 |
| 10. | "I.C.U." | 3:14 |
| 11. | "Disenchanted" | 6:16 |
| 12. | "Desert Lights" | 4:30 |
| Total length: | | 55:26 |

Side D – 2013 Re-issue exclusive
| No. | Title | Length |
|---|---|---|
| 13. | "RF-I" | 4:02 |
| 14. | "RF-II" | 4:14 |
| 15. | "RF-III" | 2:10 |
| 16. | "RF-IV" | 3:19 |
| 17. | "RF-V" | 5:45 |
| Total length: | | 1:14:56 |
