= Acrimony (band) =

Welsh heavy metal band

- Origin: Swansea, Wales, United Kingdom
- Genres: Stoner rock, doom metal
- Years active: 1991–1999
- Labels: Godhead Records, Game Two Records, Peaceville Records, Leaf Hound Records, Shiver Records<music for nations>
- Members: Dorian "Dexter" Walters; Stuart O'Hara; Matthew Lee "Roy" Davies; Darren Ivey; Paul "Mead" Bidmead
- Past members: David "Dai" Jones
- Website: blackmetal.com/~mega/acrimony/

Acrimony was a Welsh heavy metal band from Swansea who was active during the 1990s. Releasing their debut album in 1994, they are regarded as the pioneers of stoner metal in the United Kingdom, and an important influence upon the scene.

== Career ==
Although the band never achieved mainstream success, during their career they received much critical acclaim – they were nominated for the Kerrang! Best Newcomer award and earned top review ratings. Acrimony have maintained a cult following in the British metal scene, their records reportedly selling for vast sums as collector's items. AllMusic described their musical style as a "powerful blend of Black Sabbath’s heavy metal riffery, Hawkwind's space rock excursions, and Blue Cheer's fuzzed-out psychedelic feedback." In 2019, Kerrang! listed Acrimony as part of "20 bands who didn't get the respect they deserved".

== Post split ==
Since their split in 1999, Stu O'Hara went on to play guitar in Iron Monkey before the outfit disbanded, then he went on to form the Dukes of Nothing with other ex-Iron Monkey members and members of Orange Goblin. Lee 'Roy' went on to form Swansea-based crust, power violence six-piece Black Eye Riot along with Stu and Dorian. Darren and Mead formed the 9ine, and Mead has his own trance project Yeti. Lee 'Roy' Davies now plays in the heavy metal band Lifer. In 2008 Stu, Mead, Darren and Dorian re-grouped and wrote tracks as Sigiriya, releasing an album called Return to Earth in 2011. A change of vocalist came in Matt "Pipes" Williams for 2013 release Darkness Died Today. Lee 'Roy' formed Woven Man and released their debut album entitled Revelry (In Our Arms) in January 2019.

In November 2019, Acrimony's three albums, Hymns to the Stone, Tumuli Shroomaroom and Bong On - Live Long! were reissued in 3CD digipack and remastered edition by the Dutch music label Burning World Records.

== Band members ==
- Dorian "Dexter" Walters – vocals
- Stuart O'Hara – guitar
- Matthew Lee "Roy" Davies – guitar
- Paul "Mead" Bidmead – bass
- Darren Ivey – drums

Former members

- David "Dai" Jones – Bass

== Discography ==
=== Albums ===
Year	Title	Label	Notes
1994	Hymns to the Stone	Godhead Records	Debut album
1997	Tumuli Shroomaroom	Peaceville Records	Reissued in 2007 on Leaf Hound Records
2007	Bong On - Live Long!	Leaf Hound Records	Compilation album
2019	The Chronicles of Wode	Burning World Records	3CD with all 3 albums in digipack and remastered editions

=== EPs and Singles ===
Year	Title	Label	Notes
1992	A Sombre Thought	None	EP, self-released
1993	Solstice Sadness	Shiver Records	EP
1995	The Acid Elephant	Godhead Records	EP, later included on Bong On - Live Long!
1996	Motherslug	Game Two Records	Split-single with Iron Rainbow
2003	Acrimony/Church of Misery	Game Two Records	Split-EP with Church of Misery, later included on Bong On - Live Long!

=== Compilation appearances ===
- 1996 – "Earthchild Inferno" on Dark Passages Volume II, later included on Bong On - Live Long!
- 1997 – "Bud Song" on Burn One Up
- 1998 – "Find The Path" on Stoned Revolution
- 1998 – "O Baby" on Peaceville X, later included on Bong On - Live Long!
- 1999 – "Tumuli Shroomaroom" on Rise 13: Magick Rock Volume 1
- 2001 – "Satellite 19" on 21st Century Media Blitz Volume II
