= If Crimson Was Your Colour =

Single by Witchcraft
- Released: 2006
- Recorded: Bombshelter Studios; Feb 2006
- Genre: occult rock
- Label: Rise Above Records

Witchcraft singles chronology
| "Chylde of Fire" (2005) | "If Crimson Was Your Colour" (2006) | "The Alchemist" (2007) |

"If Crimson Was Your Colour" is a single of the Swedish occult rock band Witchcraft released by Rise Above Records in 2006. Both tracks were previously unreleased.

== Pressing information ==
The single was originally released on red vinyl, clear vinyl and black vinyl. In 2007, it was repressed on green vinyl, blue vinyl and brown vinyl. According to Rise Above, the following quantities were printed:

=== Original press ===
- 225 black vinyl
- 525 clear vinyl
- 336 red vinyl

=== Repress ===
- 100 blue vinyl
- 200 green vinyl
- 200 brown vinyl

== Track listing ==
1. "If Crimson Was Your Colour" – 3:54
2. "I Know You Killed Someone" – 3:38
