= Leaf Hound Records =

Japanese record label

Leaf Hound
- Genre: Doom metal Stoner rock
- Country of origin: Japan
- Official website: leafhound.com

Leaf Hound Records is a Japanese record label specializing in 1960s and 1970s inspired stoner/doom metal. The label takes its name from the 1970s hard rock band Leaf Hound. Leaf Hound Records has released material from Japanese bands such as Church of Misery and Sonic Flower, US bands such as Blood Farmers and Acid King and European bands such as Orange Sunshine and Acrimony. They have re-released a number of albums that were originally released by Germany's Hellhound Records. These reissues include Revelation's Never Comes Silence, Iron Man's Black Night and The Passage, and the Blood Farmers self-titled album. They have also reissued two other Revelation albums, Salvation's Answer (originally on Rise Above Records) and an unreleased album, and have also announced plans to issue Revelation's fourth album, Release.

They have begun releasing Japanese versions of Rise Above Records releases, such as Witchcraft's third album, The Alchemist, and Electric Wizard's Witchcult Today, along with lesser known releases such as Gentlemans Pistols and Winters. They have also released Japanese versions of Witchcraft's previous two albums, Witchcraft and Firewood in 2008.

As of 2008, the label's state is unknown, as confirmed by Tom Sutton of Church of Misery in an interview. This is due to the label owner having a severe nervous breakdown.

== Discography ==
- LHR-001 Blood Farmers – Permanent Brain Damage (CD) (released in 1995)
- LHR-002 Sonic Flower – Sonic Flower (CD)
- LHR-003 Place of Skulls – With Vision (CD)
- LHR-004/5 Church of Misery – Early Works Compilation (2CD)
- LHR-006 Orange Sunshine – Homo Erectus (CD)
- LHRLP-006 Orange Sunshine – Homo Erectus (LP)
- LHR-007 Orange Sunshine – Love=Acid Space=Hell (CD)
- LHR-008 Acid King – III (CD)
- LHR-010 Om – Conference of the Birds (CD)
- LHRLP-011 Church of Misery – Master of Brutality (LP)
- LHR-012 Ogre – Seven Hells (CD)
- LHR-013 Acid King – The Early Years (CD)
- LHR-014 Acrimony – Tumuli Shroomaroom (CD)
- LHRLP-014/2 Acrimony – Tumuli Shroomaroom (2LP)
- LHR-015 Acrimony – Bong on – Live Long! (CD)
- LHR-016 Orange Sunshine – Bullseye of Beling (CD)
- LHRLP-016 Orange Sunshine – Bullseye of Beling (LP)
- LHR-018 Revelation – Never Comes Silence (CD)
- LHR-019 Revelation – Unreleased Album (LP) *NEVER RELEASED*
- LHR-021 Revelation – Salvation's Answer (CD)
- LHR-022/LHR7-023 Church of Misery – Vol 1 (LP) + "Race with the Devil" (7")
- LHR-025 Gentlemans Pistols – Gentlemans Pistols (CD)
- LHR-026 Winters – Black Clouds in Twin Galaxies (CD)
- LHR-027 Dzjenghis Khan – Dzjenghis Khan (CD)
- LHR-028 Witchcraft – The Alchemist (CD)
- LHR-029 Blood Farmers – Blood Farmers (CD)
- LHRLP-030 Iron Man – Black Night (LP) *NEVER RELEASED*
- LHR-031 Iron Man – The Passage (CD)
- LHR-032 Electric Wizard – Witchcult Today (CD)
- LHR-033 Various Artists – Requiem of Confusion (CD)
- LHR-035 Witchcraft – Witchcraft (CD)
- LHR-036 Witchcraft – Firewood (CD)
- LHR-037 Ogre – Plague of the Planet (CD)
- LHR-038 Revelation – Release (CD)

== See also ==
- List of record labels
