= Diego Garcia (musician) =

American musician

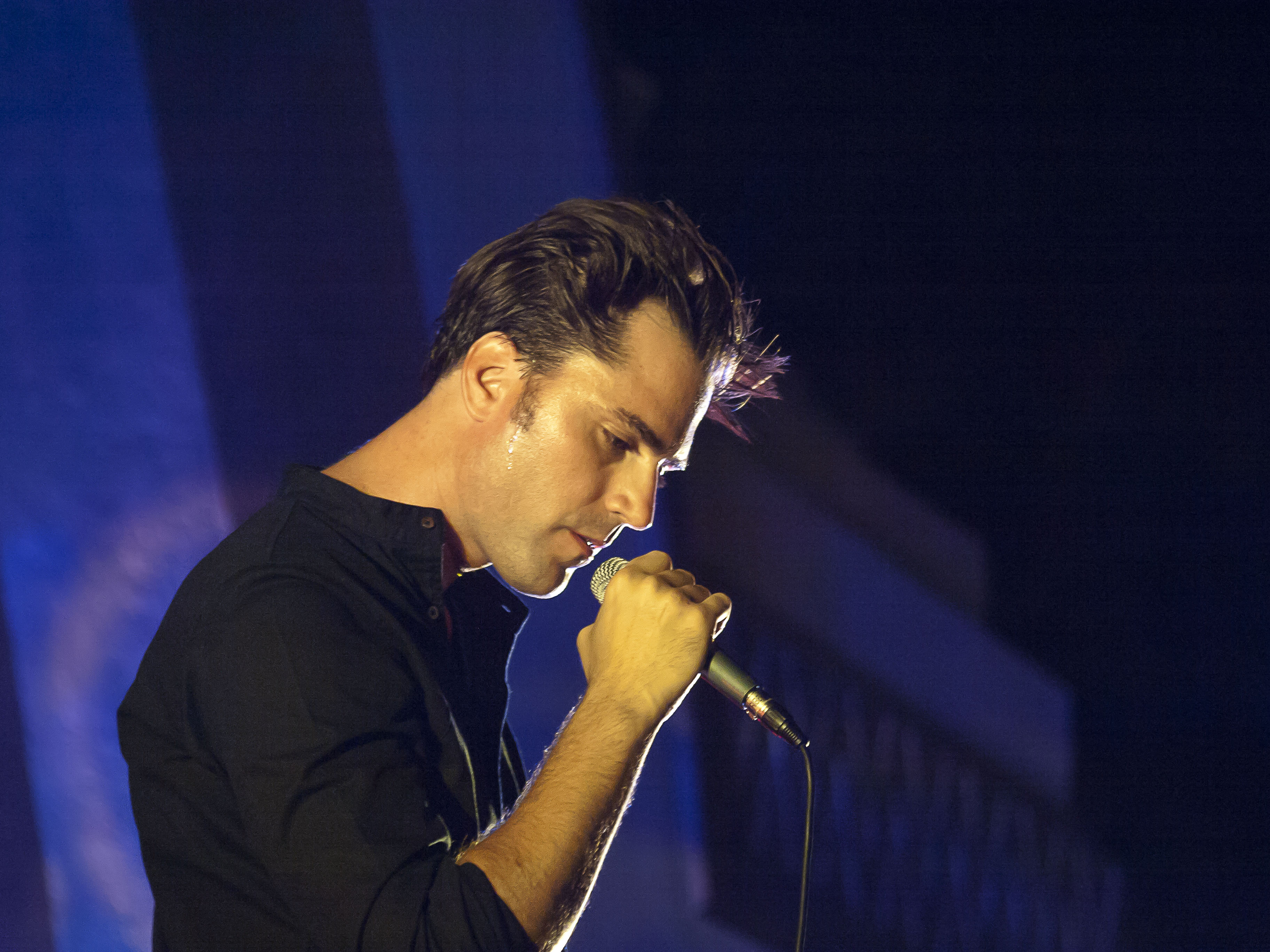
Garcia in 2012

Diego Garcia is an American musician. He was the lead singer of the band Elefant and later became a solo artist.

Garcia was born in Detroit, Michigan to Argentine parents, raised in Tampa, Florida, and educated at Brown University. He first broke into the music world as the lead singer of the New York-based band Elefant, a group aligned with the postmodern movement. New York magazine once described him as the “Sexiest Lead Singer."

In April 2011 he released his first solo album Laura. Garcia’s band includes an Italian-born cellist and a Spanish-styled guitarist, plus a tight rhythm section. Garcia cites the young Julio Iglesias as his role model. He has taken inspiration from and has been compared to Leonard Cohen due to their florid instrumental sounds and soul-rending ballads, but most importantly the album was inspired by his girlfriend Laura. The couple is now married, with a young daughter.

On August 9, 2013, Diego's second solo album release was announced. Paradise was released October 8, 2013.

== Discography ==
- Laura (2011)
- Paradise (2013)
