= Saviours (band) =

American heavy metal band

- Origin: Oakland, California, U.S.
- Genres: Heavy metal; stoner metal; doom metal; thrash metal
- Years active: 2004–present
- Labels: Kemado; Level Plane; Listenable
- Members: Austin Barber; Sonny Reinhardt; Scott Batiste; Carson Binks
- Past members: Cyrus Comiskey; D. Tyler Morris

Saviours is an American heavy metal band formed in Oakland, California, in 2004. Since then, they have released five albums and two EPs.

== Members ==
- Austin Barber – vocals, lead and rhythm guitar
- Sonny Christopher Reinhardt – lead and rhythm guitar
- Andy Anderson – bass
- Scott Batiste – drums

=== Former members ===
- Cyrus Comiskey (Black Fork, Drunk Horse) – bass
- Dean Tyler Morris (a.k.a. Balls Larson) – Lead and rhythm guitar
- Mag Delana (Yaphet Kotto, Bread and Circuits) – Lead and rhythm guitar
- Carson Binks – Bass

== Discography ==
=== EPs ===
- Warship (2005) (Level Plane Records)
- Cavern of Mind (2007) (Kemado Records)

=== Studio albums ===
- Crucifire (2006) (Level Plane Records)
- Into Abaddon (2008) (Kemado Records)
- Accelerated Living (2009) (Kemado Records)
- Death's Procession (2011) (Kemado Records)
- Palace of Vision (2015) (Listenable Records)

=== Singles ===
- 2008: "Narcotic Sea" (Kemado Records)

=== Other appearances ===
- Metal Swim – Adult Swim compilation album (2010)
