= Blood Lust =

Studio album by Uncle Acid and the Deadbeats
- Released: 2011
- Genre: Doom metal; stoner metal; psychedelic rock; occult rock
- Length: 47:17
- Label: Rise Above

Uncle Acid and the Deadbeats chronology
Volume 1 (2010)	Blood Lust (2011)	Mind Control (2013)

Blood Lust is the second studio album by British band Uncle Acid and the Deadbeats. It was released in 2011 through Killer Candy Records, and later through Rise Above Records.

== Background and production ==
Uncle Acid and the Deadbeats member Kevin Starrs initially placed the songs on MySpace and YouTube where they developed a fanbase who requested an album. For their first album, Volume I, they created approximately 30 CD-R copies of the album and with the money made for those releases, the group put into recording Blood Lust with better recording equipment. The album was recorded in a friend of Starrs garage. Starrs mentioned that the band "really did fall apart when we made Blood Lust." At the end of recording, the remaining members were the drummer and Starrs.

The album cover references the poster for the West German film Mark of the Devil.

== Release ==
Like Volume 1, Blood Lust was initially released as a CD-R album with about 100 copies made. Blood Lust was re-released by Rise Above Records in 2011 on vinyl. Starrs stated that when Rise Above released the album, he regrouped new members for the band to continue work on future albums.

The album was released by Metal Blade Records on 20 November 2012.

== Critical reception ==
Professional ratings
Review scores
Source	Rating
Allmusic	4/5 stars

AllMusic critic Eduardo Rivadavia was positive in his assessment of the album, stating that "none of this is exactly groundbreaking [...] but Uncle Acid & the Deadbeats make it work nonetheless on the strength of their convictions about this peculiar period and its music, ultimately proving yet again that great songs will always transcend the most recycled of building blocks."

== Track listing ==
All songs written by K.R. Starrs.

No.	Title	Length
1.	"I'll Cut You Down"	5:01
2.	"Death's Door"	7:15
3.	"Over and Over Again"	3:20
4.	"Curse in the Trees"	4:38
5.	"I'm Here to Kill You"	3:40
6.	"13 Candles"	6:58
7.	"Ritual Knife"	4:43
8.	"Withered Hand of Evil"	6:14
9.	"Down to the Fire"	5:28
