= Audionom =

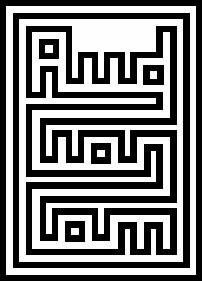

Background information
- Origin: Stockholm, Sweden
- Genres: Indie rock; instrumental rock; krautrock; electronic rock; progressive rock; art rock; experimental rock; space rock
- Years active: 1999–2002; 2004–2005; 2007–present
- Labels: Gone Beyond Records, Du, jag och Åskar Brickman, Kemado Records, iDEAL Recordings etc.
- Members: Johan Hinders; Paul Sigerhall; Martin Malm; Mårten Holmberg; Andreas Bergman; Pelle Backman
- Past members: Peter Backebo; Christian Berg; Koffe Berger; Henrik Hannebo; Peter Jidling; Tomas Kanerva; Mats Björk; Henrik Levander; Aurelia Le Huche

Audionom is a krautrock and space rock band from Sweden.

== History ==
Audionom is a Stockholm supergroup that quickly became a popular live act known for its abrasive shows that also integrated the films of member Martin Malm. The bands hypnotic pummeling sound took inspiration from their love for such early experimental visionaries as Hawkwind, Einstürzende Neubauten and Neu!

Audionom was formed in 1999 by members of two local Stockholm bands, Apparat and PVC. They released a number of tapes and singles for Swedish labels between 1999 and 2002, which were collected onto a full-length album entitled Retrospektiv, released in 2005. The group broke up before Kemado Records heard it and offered to release it in the United States. Kemado's reissue came out early in 2007. The band reunited in 2007 released a new album - entitled 'Superior' - on Ideal Recordings on February 26, 2009.

The 7" single "Europa" was released in December 2013 and the LP "Total" in spring 2014 on Gone Beyond Records. The digital single "Glassbees" was released 2018.

Related existing or non existing bands with members from past or today Audionom include: 1999, Fé, Appareil, Tvillingarna, Intergalactica, The Tourettes, Sibille Attar, Nova Express, The Vectors, Paper, The Janitors, Scumbrigade, Seamonster1, Kite, Urkona, Mimerska väven and more.

== Discography ==
- Audionom (2001), 7" on Truckfighter Recordings and Beauty Resources
- Audionom / Sickoakes - Split LP (2002), LP on Mothertrucker Records
- Retrospektiv (2005), CD on iDEAL Recordings and Kemado Records
- Audionom I (2006), DVD on Filmkransen
- Superior (2009), CD on iDEAL Recordings
- Inferior 1 (2009), 7" on Du & Jag + Åskar Brickman
- Inferior 2 (2010), 7" on Du & Jag + Åskar Brickman
- Inferior 3 (2010), 7" on Du & Jag + Åskar Brickman
- Europa (2013), 7" on Gone Beyond Records
- Tell it to the wind (2014), B-side on Josefin Öhrn + The Liberation 7" on Gone Beyond Records
- Total (2014), LP on Gone Beyond Records
- Glass bees (2018), on Lazy Octopus Records

== Members ==
Current members

- Johan Hinders - synth, vocals (1999–present)
- Paul Sigerhall - drums (1999–present)
- Martin Malm - visuals (1999–present)
- Mårten Holmberg - guitar (2004–2005, 2007–present)
- Andreas Bergman - guitar (2004–2005, 2007–present)
- Pelle Backman - bass, backing vocals (2007–present)

Former members

- Peter Backebo - guitar, backing vocals (1999–2002)
- Koffe Berger - vocals (1999–2000, 2004–2005)
- Christian Berg - bass (2001–2002, 2004–2005)
- Henrik Hannebo - synth (1999–2001, 2004–2005, 2007–2014)
- Peter Jidling - bass (1999–2001)
- Tomas Kanerva - fx (2000–2002)
- Mats Björk - synth (2001–2002)
- Henrik Levander - drums (1999–2000)
- Aurelia Le Huche - percussion (2004–2005).
