= Diamond Nights =

American hard/indie rock band

- Origin: New York City, New York
- Genre: Rock
- Years active: 2003 - present
- Label: Kemado Records
- Members: Morgan Phalen; Seth Rumsey; Tim Traynor
- Past members: Rob Laakso

Diamond Nights is a hard rock/indie rock band whose influences include Thin Lizzy, Queen, and Cheap Trick. They formed in New York City in 2003, and released their debut album Popsicle in 2005. The band's song "The Girl's Attractive" was featured in a 2006 Jaguar advertisement, as well as the episode entitled "Thirst" from The CW's Smallville and in an Austrian beer (Stiegl) commercial. Their song "Saturday Fantastic" was featured in an episode of BoJack Horseman.

== Band members ==
- Morgan Phalen – vocals, guitar
- Rob Laakso – guitar, synthesizers
- Seth Rumsey – bass
- Tim Traynor – drums

== Discography ==
- So Fantastic (Limited Vinyl EP) (2004)
- Once We Were Diamonds (EP) (2005)
- Popsicle (2005)
