= Danava (band) =

American rock band

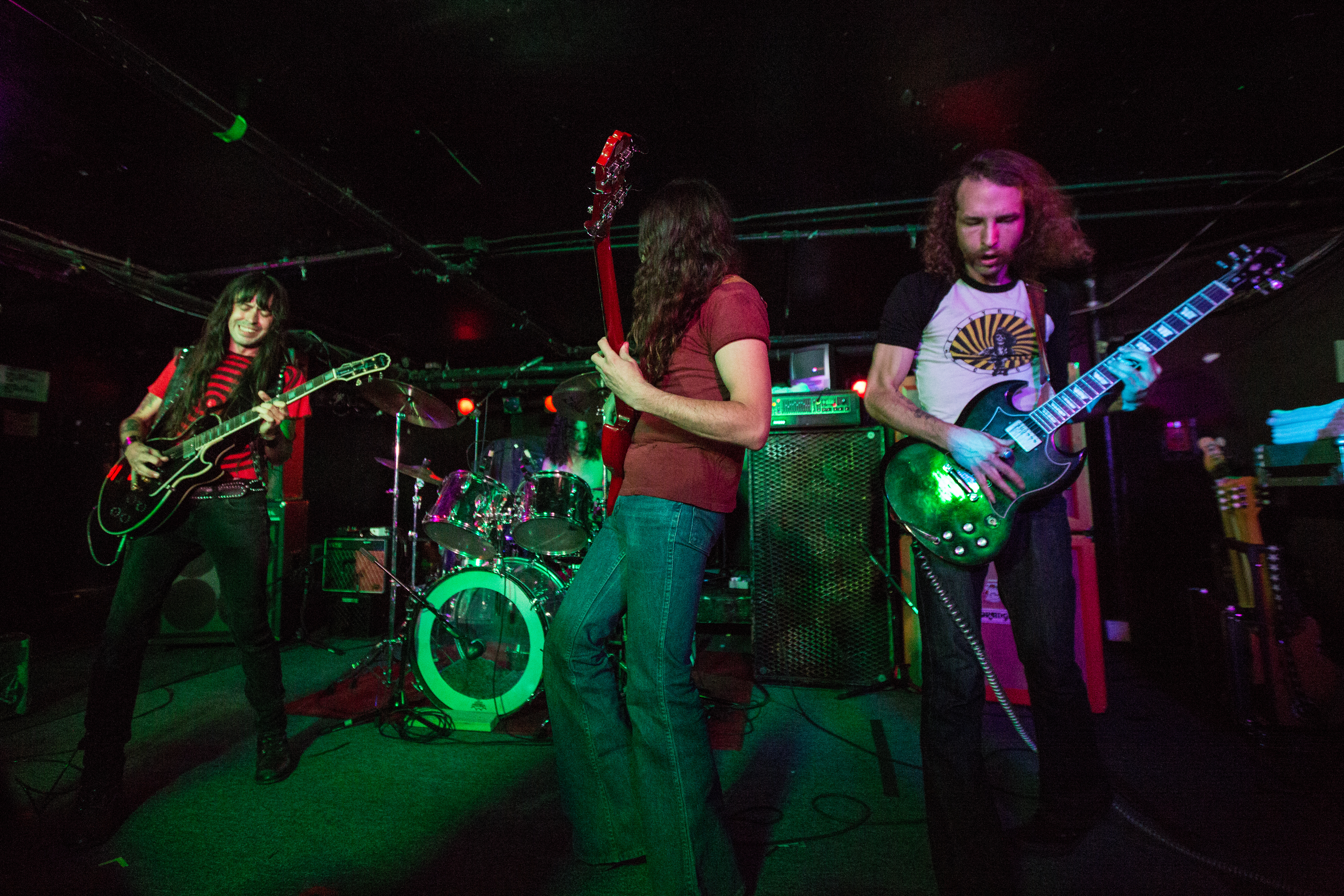
- Danava in 2014.

Background information
- Origin: Portland, Oregon, United States
- Genres: Hard rock; psychedelic rock; progressive rock
- Years active: 2003–present
- Label: Kemado
- Members: Gregory Meleney; Monte Mattsson; Levi Vy Campbell
- Past members: Peter Hughes; Zachariah Dellorto-Blackwell; Monte Mattsson; Andrew Forgash; Ben Vargas; Jarred Rockwell; Sean Ongley; Matt Oliver; Kerby Strom; Dominic Casciato

Danava (pronounced DON-UH-VUH) is an American rock band from Portland, Oregon. Its music fits into the categories of, and is influenced by, hard rock, progressive rock and psychedelic rock.

== History ==
Danava was formed in 2003 by Gregory Meleney, Monte Mattsson, Zachariah Dellorto-Blackwell and Ben Vargas. Meleney and Mattsson had known each other as teenagers in Quincy, Illinois. They met Dellorto-Blackwell later and moved to Portland, Oregon, where they met Vargas. They released a demo together in 2004. In 2005 Vargas left the band and was replaced by Jarred Rockwell on synthesizers just before the band signed with Kemado Records. This four piece toured extensively and recorded their self-titled album in 2006 and UnonoU in 2008. Meleney plays most of the keyboard on both records.

A video for the song "Where Beauty And Terror Dance" (UnonoU, 2008) was released and played on MTV2's Headbangers Ball.

In summer 2008, Rockwell left the band for other musical pursuits on the east coast. In September 2009, Mattsson left the group to pursue his studies in biology and was replaced by Matthew Oliver. Andrew Forgash, a rhythm guitarist, also joined at this time.

In 2011 the album Hemisphere of Shadows was released, leading to several European tours.

Danava have toured with Down (twice), Voivod, Melvins, Acid Mothers Temple, Witchcraft (three times), Uncle Acid & the Deadbeats, Lecherous Gaze, Thrones, Weedeater, Gentlemans Pistols and played at the 2008 Roadburn Festival in the Netherlands and Muskelrock in Sweden, 2013.

In 2013, Bass player Dellorto-Blackwell left the band. He joined Lecherous Gaze for a few tours as a rhythm guitarist and is on the album One Fifteen. In 2019, still on guitar, he started the band Rocky MTN Roller.

He was replaced by Dominic Casciato. Shortly after, Forgash left the group to pursue a career in a different field and was replaced by rhythm guitar player Peter Hughes of the band Sons Of Huns. This formation recorded the single "At Midnight You Die." Shortly after, Hughes was replaced by Kerby Strom.

== Members ==
- Gregory Meleney - Guitar, vocals
- Peter Hughes - Guitar
- Dominic Casciato - Bass
- Matthew Oliver - Drums

== Discography ==
=== Demos ===
- A four-song demo with versions of "By The Mark", "Eyes In Disguise" and "Longdance", and an unreleased song, "Jack". Recorded in 2004.

=== Albums ===
- Danava CD/LP (2006 Kemado Records)
- UnonoU CD/LP (2008 Kemado Records)
- Hemisphere of Shadows CD/LP (2011 Kemado Records)
- Nothing But Nothing CD/LP (2023 Tee Pee Records)
- Danava Live CD/LP (2024 Heavy Psych Sounds Records)

=== EPs/singles ===
- "Quiet Babies Astray in a Manger" 12" (2006 Kemado Records)
- "Where Beauty & Terror Dance" 7" (2007 Kemado Records)
- "Danava/Earthless/Lecherous Gaze" Split 12" (2011 Kemado Records)
- "Danava/Uncle Acid & the Deadbeats" Split 7" (2011 Kemado Records)
- "Grave Command" (exclusive track on compilation: "Grave Command") (2012 Unseen Forces)
- "Heavy Devil Star Crash-The 2004 Demos" 12" (2013 Unseen Forces Records)
- "At Midnight You Die" 7" (2016 Tee Pee Records)
