= Kemado Records =

- Founded: 2002
- Founder: Andrés Santo Domingo and Tom Clapp
- Distributors: ADA, Essential
- Genre: Rock, indie rock, alternative rock, heavy metal, hard rock
- Country of origin: (United States) USA
- Location: Brooklyn, NYC
- Official website: www.kemado.com

Kemado Records is an American record label based in New York City founded in 2002 by Andrés Santo Domingo and Tom Clapp.

In 2006 the label released the Invaders compilation, which featured many of the label's bands alongside other hard rock and heavy metal bands such as Witchcraft, High on Fire and Witch.

In 2008, Kemado introduced its Mexican Summer imprint. The label focuses on digital and limited-edition vinyl releases. Then in October 2009 Kemado Records and Mexican Summer opened Co-Op 87, a destination brick-and-mortar record store in Greenpoint, Brooklyn with several other record labels, an idea label owner Andrés Santo Domingo called a "vinyl co-op store." They also opened Gary's Electric Studio, a commercial recording space, at the same location.

In 2011, Mexican Summer and Kemado Records introduced a new subsidiary label called Software Recording Co. It is run by Daniel Lopatin, who records under the name Oneohtrix Point Never and whose collaborative album with Joel Ford, Channel Pressure, served as the label's inaugural release. Software Recording Co. focuses mostly on experimental electronic and dance music.

One of Kemado's biggest successes was 2006's release of Age of Winters by The Sword, which has sold over 80,000 copies.

== Artists and releases ==
- Audionom
- Cheeseburger
- Children
- Danava
- Diamond Nights
- Dungen
- Electric Voyage
- Elefant
- EYE
- Farmer Dave Scher
- Futur Skullz
- Grails
- Langhorne Slim
- Lansing-Dreiden
- Marissa Nadler
- Moab
- O'Death
- Priestbird
- Saviours
- Slices
- Spiders
- The Fever
- The Orkustra
- The Soft Pack
- The Sword
- TK Webb & The Visions
- True Widow
- Turzi
- VietNam
- Wild Hunt
- Xasthur
- Zond

=== Compilations ===
Invaders Voyage: Facing the History of French Modern Psychedelic Music Shout!: The Revolution Rave-Up Alive 1997–2003

== Executives ==
- Thomas Clapp—Managing Director and Co-Founder
- Andrés Santo Domingo—President and Co-Founder
- Keith Abrahamsson—Head of A&R
- Warren Konigsmark- General Manager

== See also ==
- List of record labels
