= Juan Garcia =

Juan Garcia may refer to:

== Arts and entertainment ==
- Juan García de Zéspedes (c. 1619–1678), Mexican composer
- Juan García de Salazar (c. 1639–1710), Spanish composer
- Juan Francisco García (composer) (1892–1974), Dominican Merengue musician
- Juan García (Mexican actor) (1905–1973), Mexican actor and screenwriter
- Juan García Esquivel (1918–2002), Mexican band leader
- Juan García Larrondo (born 1965), Spanish playwright
- Juan Garcia (guitarist) (born 1966), American musician, guitarist for Los Angeles thrash-metallers Agent Steel and Evildead
- Juan Carlos García (actor) (born 1971), Venezuelan actor and model
- Juan Garcia (poet), 1990 Prix Alain-Grandbois
- Juan Garcia (actor), see the Star Trek: Voyager episode "Lineage"
- Juan García Cortes, fictional character in Grand Theft Auto: Vice City

== Law and politics ==
- Juan García Gruber (1904–1997), Venezuelan writer and diplomat
- Juan García Ducós (fl. 1917–1928), Puerto Rican politician
- Juan Manuel García Passalacqua (1937–2010), Puerto Rican lawyer, politician, journalist
- Juan M. Garcia III (born 1966), American politician, Texas State Representative
- Juan Carlos García Padilla (born 1968), Puerto Rican politician and mayor of Coamo

== Sports ==
=== Association football (soccer) ===
- Juan Carlos García Rulfo (born 1981), Mexican goalkeeper
- Juan Enrique García (born 1970), Venezuelan striker
- Juan Francisco García García (born 1976), aka Juanfran, Spanish defender/midfielder
- Juan Manuel García (Mexican footballer) (born 1980), defender
- Juan Pablo García (born 1981), Mexican attacking midfielder
- Juan Carlos García (Mexican footballer) (born 1985), defender
- Juan Ramón García (born 1987), Spanish midfielder
- Juan Carlos García (Honduran footballer) (1988–2018), left back
- Juan Camilo García (born 1988), Colombian midfielder
- Juan García (footballer, born 1991), Argentine midfielder
- Juan Manuel García (Argentine footballer) (born 1992), forward

=== Other sports ===
- Juan Jesús García (1905–1934), Spanish Olympic fencer
- Juan García (basketball) (1926–2003), Cuban basketball player
- Juan García (sport shooter) (born 1934), Spanish Olympic shooter
- Juan García Such (1937–2009), Spanish racing cyclist
- Juan García (hurdler) (born 1945), Cuban former hurdler
- Juan Manuel García (water polo) (born 1951), Mexican Olympic water polo player
- Juan García (equestrian) (born 1965), Spanish Olympic equestrian
- Juan Pablo García (racing driver) (born 1987), Mexican racing driver
- Juan Diego García López (born 2002), Mexican para taekwondo practitioner
- Juan García (volleyball), Mexican volleyball player, see 2008 Men's Pan-American Volleyball Cup squads
- Juan Alejandro García, Colombian road cyclist, see 2010 Vuelta a Colombia
- Juanín García (born 1977), Spanish handball player

== Others ==
- Juan García (bishop) (died 1601), Spanish Roman Catholic bishop
- Juan García (privateer) (fl. 1622), Spanish privateer
- Juan García Oliver (1901–1980), Spanish (Catalan) anarchist
- Juan Pujol García (1912–1988), Spanish World War II spy
- Juan García Ábrego (born 1944), Mexican drug lord in the Gulf Cartel
- Juan Martin Garcia, (1980–2015), American executed for murder in Texas
- Juan García Postigo (born 1981), Spanish model and Mister World 2007
- Juan Elias Garcia (born 1993), Salvadoran-American on the FBI Ten Most Wanted Fugitives list

== Other uses ==
- Juan García (grape), a Spanish red grape variety

== See also ==
- John Garcia (disambiguation)
- Juanín García (born 1977), Spanish handball player
