= Only a Suggestion =

...Only a Suggestion

Studio album by Hermano
- Released: 2002
- Genre: Stoner metal
- Length: 28:00
- Label: Tee Pee; Suburban (2007 reissue); Ripple Music (2023 remaster)

Hermano chronology
...Only a Suggestion (2002)	Dare I Say... (2004)

Professional ratings
Review scores
Source	Rating
AllMusic	3/5 stars

...Only a Suggestion is the debut studio album by the stoner rock band Hermano. It was released by Tee Pee Records with a sampler of other bands such as High on Fire and Black NASA.

== Track listing ==
=== Disc One ===
No.	Title	Writer(s)	Length
1.	"The Bottle"	Dandy Brown, John Garcia, David Angstrom, Mike Callahan	4:42
2.	"Alone Jeffe"	Brown, Garcia, Angstrom, Callahan	3:21
3.	"Manager's Special"	Callahan, Garcia, Brown	3:14
4.	"Senor Moreno's Introduction" (instrumental)	Brown	1:16
5.	"Senor Moreno's Plan"	Brown, Garcia	4:03
6.	"Landetta (Motherload)"	Callahan, Garcia, Angstrom	3:49
7.	"5 to 5"	Callahan, Garcia, Angstrom	2:57
8.	"Nick's Yea"	Brown, Garcia	4:36

=== Disc Two - Tee Pee Records Spring 2002 Sampler ===
No.	Title	Writer(s)	Length
1.	"Seattle Shakedown"	Lost Goat	3:47
2.	"Ripped in Half"	Boulder	3:32
3.	"Steel Shoe"	High on Fire	4:32
4.	"Alone Jeffe"	Hermano	3:23
5.	"Diamond Girl"	Black NASA	4:00
6.	"Hurricane" (demo)	Bad Wizard	3:26
7.	"C'mon Baby" (demo)	All Night Gang	3:28

== Personnel ==
- John Garcia – vocals
- David Angstrom – guitar
- Mike Callahan – guitar
- Steve Earle – drums
- Dandy Brown – bass, organ, piano

== Notes ==
- The album was reissued in 2007 under the Suburban Records label.
- A remixed and remastered version of the album was released in 2023 by Ripple Music.
