= John Garcia =

John Garcia or Johnny Garcia may refer to:

== Entertainment ==
- John Garcia (dog trainer) (born 1981), star of National Geographic's DogTown series
- John Garcia (singer) (born 1970), American rock singer
  - John Garcia (album)

== Sport ==
- Johnny García (born 1978), Mexican footballer
- John García (footballer) (born 2000), Bolivian footballer

== Others ==
- John Garcia, Chilean national, one of the "Brisbane Three" accused of conspiracy in Queensland, Australia, in 1974, later acquitted
- John A. Garcia (born 1949), entrepreneur and philanthropist in the American computer game industry
- John Garcia (politician) (1928–2003), member of the Ohio House of Representatives
- John Garcia (psychologist) (1917–2012), American psychologist
- Johnny Garcia (politician), U.S. Representative-elect

== See also ==
- Jhon García (born 1974), Colombian cyclist
- Jon García (disambiguation)
- Jonathan Garcia (born 1986), American speed skater
- Juan Garcia (disambiguation)
