= Hendrik Willemyns =

Belgian musician and filmmaker (born 1972)

- Born: 21 January 1972 (age 53); Belgium
- Genres: Electronica
- Occupations: Musician; filmmaker
- Member of: Arsenal

Hendrik Willemyns (born 21 January 1972) is a Belgian musician, producer, and filmmaker best known for his work with the band Arsenal.

== Career ==
=== Music ===
Arsenal was founded by Willemyns and John Roan in 1999. The name of their band was derived from a weapon depository located next to their studio in Brussels. They released their first single, the aptly titled "Release", in 1999. Their debut album, Oyebo Soul, came out in 2003, and they have since released six more studio albums: Outsides (2005), Lotuk (2008), Lokemo (2011), Furu (2014), In the Rush of Shaking Shoulders (2018), and The Rhythm of the Band (2021). The band has collaborated with numerous international vocalists on their recordings, including Grant Hart, Johnny Whitney, Aaron Perrino, Mike Ladd, Melanie Pain, Gabriel Rios, and Shawn Smith.

In 2015, Willemyns composed the soundtrack for The Ardennes, a film by Robin Pront.

=== Film ===
Lotuk (2008)

Lotuk is Willemyn's first feature-length documentary. It accompanies Arsenal's third studio album, 2008's Lotuk, and shows interviews with four American guest vocalists involved in the record: Shawn Smith (Brad, Satchel, Pigeonhed), John Garcia (Kyuss, Vista Chino), Cortney Tidwell, and Grant Hart (Hüsker Dü). The documentary was selected for Docville, the International Documentary Film Festival in Leuven.

Paper Trails (2010)

In 2010, Willemyns created this six-part documentary Paper Trails for one of Belgium's national TV stations. Each episode highlights a literary classic.

- Ep. 1 – F. Scott Fitzgerald – Tender Is the Night
- Ep. 2 – Chinua Achebe – Things Fall Apart
- Ep. 3 – Stanisław Lem – Solaris
- Ep. 4 – George Orwell – Burmese Days
- Ep. 5 – Roberto Bolaño – The Savage Detectives
- Ep. 6 – Haruki Murakami – Norwegian Wood

Dance! Dance! Dance! (2014)

In 2014, Willemyns wrote and produced the film Dance! Dance! Dance! Featuring Ayumi Ito and Dean Fujioka, it tells the story of a Japanese DJ fighting his inner demons. It is written by Willemyns and Johnny Whitney (The Blood Brothers) and produced in collaboration with Japanese director Ken Ochiai. The mid-length feature film was turned into a concert premiering at Film Fest Gent in 2014, with the soundtrack performed live by Arsenal.

Birdsong (2019)

For his second movie, Willemyns took on both writing and directing duties. Featuring Natsuko Kobayashi, Kazuhiko Kanayama, and Akaji Maro, Birdsong shows the dark side of the music industry through the eyes of a young woman in Tokyo who dreams of becoming a musician. The soundtrack was composed by Willemyns and Tim Bruzon, and was again performed live in a series of film concerts. The movie was sold to several countries and HBO. In 2021, Birdsong was awarded the jury prize at Cinéfest Ibiza.

Arsenal – The rhythm of the band (2021)

In this three-part TV series, a mix of documentary, fiction, and music, Willemyns raises the question, "What Is Music?" Meanwhile, his longtime musical companion John Roan is working on a black metal album. They meet up in Chongqing, China to discuss the future of their collaboration in a series of intimate talks. The series was released in May 2021.

=== Writing ===
For Birdsong, Willemyns created Room of Imaginary Creatures, a book of poems written from the point of view of a prostitute. It features music by Grant Hart, Johnny Whitney, and Jenny Rossander, among others, and poets such as Chika Unigwe, An Qi, and Fiona Pitt-Kethley. The poems were illustrated by artists from all over the globe, including Shintaro Kago, Ana Jaren, Kensuke Saito, LRNZ, and Benjamin Hendliz.
