= Juan Francisco García =

Juan Francisco García may refer to:

- Juanfran (footballer, born 1976) (Juan Francisco García García), Spanish footballer
- Juan Francisco García (boxer) (1953–2023), Mexican boxer
- Juan Francisco García (composer) (1892–1972), Dominican merengue composer
- Juan Francisco García Peña (born 1989), Spanish footballer

== See also ==
- Juan Garcia (disambiguation)
