= JPT =

JPT may refer to:

- JPT Scare Band, an American rock band
- JPT Bus Company, formerly operating in Greater Manchester, England
- EFL Trophy (formerly Johnstone's Paint Trophy), an English association football competition
