= We Want Blood! =

Studio album by Peter Pan Speedrock
- Released: September 18, 2010
- Genre: Punk rock; hard rock
- Label: Suburban Records (Benelux); People Like You (Europe)

Peter Pan Speedrock chronology
Cross Contamination (2008)	We Want Blood! (2010)

We Want Blood! is a studio album by the Dutch band Peter Pan Speedrock. It was released on September 18, 2010. Profits from the album are being donated to a charity that fights AIDS.

The band's previous album was released in 2007. The band had performances of the album booked in 2011 in Germany, Austria, Switzerland, France, Spain, Italy, Finland, Japan, and China.

The trio released a video of the sixth song on the album, "Crank Up The Everything", which, according to Music From NL spent notable time on the Dutch hit list.

== Track listing ==
1. "We Want Blood!"
2. "Goin' Downtown"
3. "Sofullashit"
4. "One-Woman Man"
5. "Just Another Day"
6. "Crank Up the Everything"
7. "It’s About You"
8. "Breaking Down"
9. "Bakkerburg"
10. "Gotta Do the Catchin' (While the Catchin' Is Good)"
11. "Bad Energy"
12. "Too Far Gone"
13. "Hell Is Where It's At"
