= Arsenal (Belgian band) =

Belgian musical duo

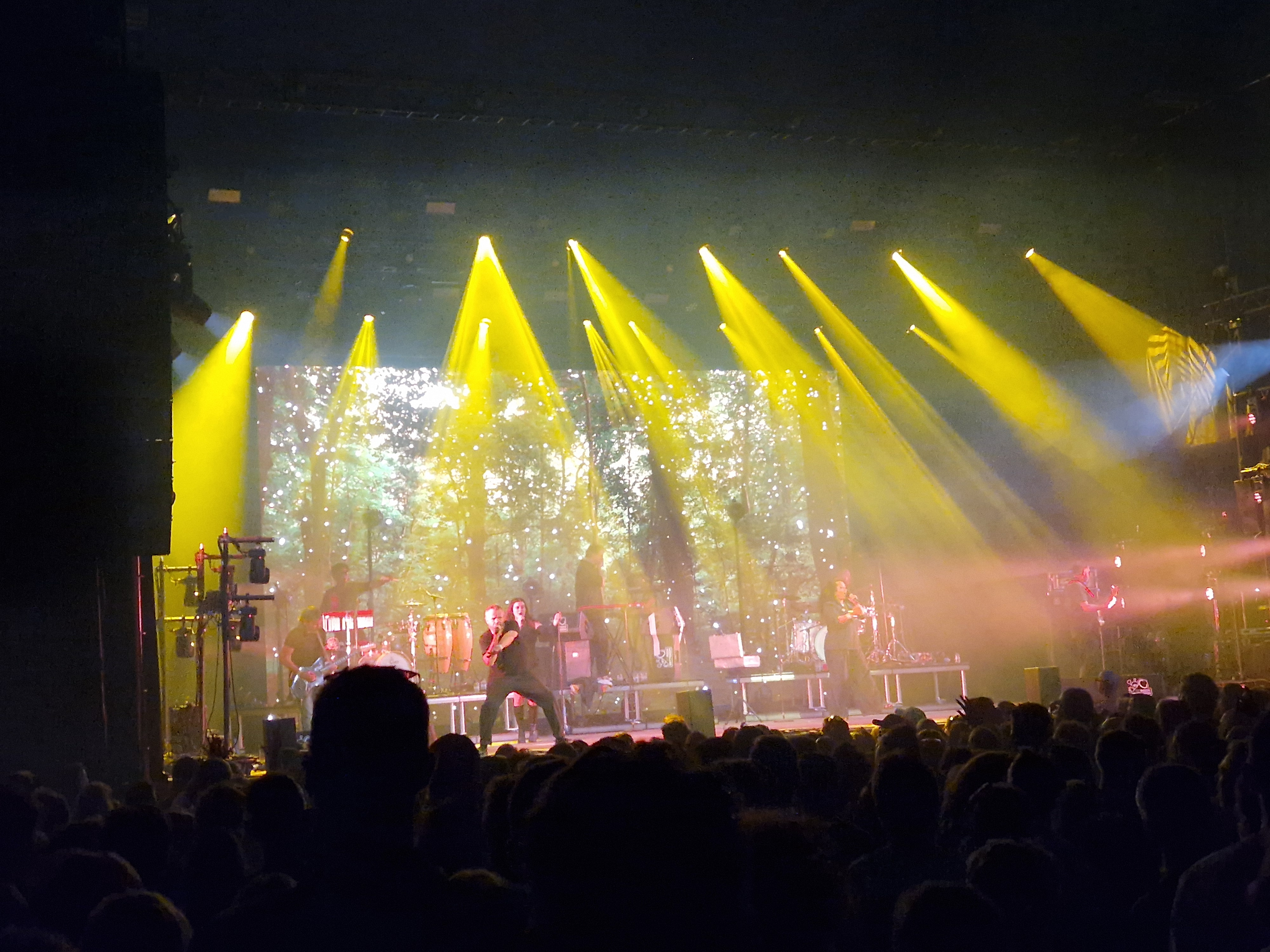
- Arsenal performing in 2025

Background information
- Origin: Belgium
- Genres: Pop, dance
- Years active: 1999–present
- Labels: Playout!, Oyebo Soel
- Members: Hendrik Willemyns; John Roan

Arsenal is an electronic music band consisting of Belgian musicians Hendrik Willemyns and John Roan. Since the issue of their debut single Release" in 1999, Arsenal have published nine albums, collaborating with a wide range of international singers and musicians including Mike Ladd, Shawn Smith, John Garcia, Grant Hart, and Johnny Whitney. Whilst rooted in electronic dance music, Arsenal have incorporated numerous other genres of music into their albums, from African and Latin American rhythms to pop, hip-hop, and indie rock.

== History ==
Taking their name from a World War II weapons depository located next to their studio in Brussels, Belgium, Hendrik Willemyns and John Roan started out with their debut EP Release issued in 1999 on the Antwerp-based Wally's Groove World label and subsequently licensed by the Ibiza label Café del Mar for their Chill-Out House compilation.

Arsenal's follow-up single, "A Volta", was the first of several collaborations with the Brazilian-born singer Mario Vitalino Dos Santos. "A Volta" was subsequently used in the final episode of the American HBO series Six Feet Under.

Arsenal's debut album Oyebo Soul was released in 2003 on the Belgian independent label Wha? Roots, and Kriztal Entertainment in the United States. Despite its eclectic nature, Oyebo Soul was well received by critics around the world, and described as "focused and unpredictable at the same time" by AllMusic. Within two years, approximately 10,000 copies were sold on the Belgian market. Meanwhile, Oyebo Soul was also released in The Netherlands, Japan, Spain, Portugal, and USA, where they were playlisted on KCRW, KUCR, and others.

Following Oyebo Soul, Arsenal signed to Belgian independent labels Playout! & PIAS for the release of their second album Outsides in 2005. It featured a cast of vocal collaborators from around the world including Aaron Perrino from the Boston band The Sheila Divine, Puerto Rican singer Gabriel Rios, Italo-Belgian singer Domenico Vaccaro, Brazilian Mario Vitalino dos Santos, and Chinese rapper Chi Zang. To accompany the album, Arsenal made a DVD, documenting the background of some of their collaborators. The album was shot on location in Boston and Buffalo, United States, Puerto Rico, and Salvador, Brazil. Outsides went Platinum in Belgium.

Following the success of Outsides, Willemyns and Roan traveled to Norway to work in isolation (‘And to get rid of the sunny vibes’, according to Willemyns), and as on their previous albums, they featured a wide range of collaborators (including Grant Hart of Hüsker Dü, Shawn Smith of Brad and Pigeonhed, Mike Ladd, Cortney Tidwell, and John Garcia from Kyuss) on their next record, Lotuk. Characterised by a much more upbeat pop sound, Lotuk saw Arsenal championed in the United States by the likes of celebrity blogger Perez Hilton: "Like A Fine Glass Of Merlot: It's pretty. It's cool. It's perfect for your next mix-CD!", and rapper Kanye West, who kept it short and simple: "Amazing!!!".

As with Outsides, Lotuk was accompanied by a documentary on DVD, filmed and edited by Willemyns, that follows the band on their road trip across the United States to meet up with Shawn Smith, John Garcia, Cortney Tidwell, and Grant Hart. The documentary was showcased at Docville, a European documentary film festival, and led to Paper Trails, a documentary series on important books of the 20th century, which was filmed and edited by Hendrik Willemyns, while John Roan captured sound. Together they provided the series with an Arsenal soundtrack. In six episodes, six books were featured: Tender Is the Night by F. Scott Fitzgerald, Solaris by Stanislaw Lem, Norwegian Wood by Haruki Murakami, Things Fall Apart by Chinua Achebe, The Savage Detectives by Roberto Bolaño, and Burmese Days by George Orwell. The series was aired on Canvas, a Belgian art channel, in 2010.

Recorded in the Breton village of Locquémeau (Breton name : Lokémo), Arsenal's fourth album, Lokemo, was released in 2011 and featured the return of some of the band's previous guests, including Shawn Smith on the single "Melvin" and Mike Ladd on "One Day at a Time". The album also featured new collaborators such as Johnny Whitney (from The Blood Brothers and Jaguar Love), Mélanie Pain, and Belgian performance artist Depotax, and ranged in style from beatless ambient tracks, house music, shoegaze, to rock.

Reconnecting the band with the dancefloor, the album’s singles were remixed by several prominent electronic music producers including Joakim, Com Truise, Optimo, and Compuphonic, and Melvin was named ‘Track of the Month’ in the UK dance music magazine Mixmag. The five-star review in MixMag on "Melvin" went as follows: "This is ticking so many boxes my biro has run out. Belgian duo (the best kind): check. Falsetto vocals: check. Spine-tingling key changes: check. The ability to send you and your chums into a pilly group hug on a dancefloor: checkmate!" DJ Mag praised the single "One Day at a Time": "Arsenal are a big deal in Europe: this has clearly nothing to do with the North London football team. Fans of Indie-disco like Mitzi and Phoenix should check the original track."

In 2011, Arsenal received the award for Best Dance at the Music Industry Awards in Belgium.

Arsenal's fifth and sixth studio albums, released in 2014 and 2018 respectively, are titled Furu and In the Rush of Shaking Shoulders.

In 2021, the duo released the album The Rhythm of the Band.

== Live performances ==
Since their early days, Arsenal have placed great store by their live performances and have played at many of the largest festivals, including Belgium's Rock Werchter festival, which they have performed at five times, including headlining the Werchter Main Stage in 2012. The same year they sold out the Lotto Arena and the Ancienne Belgique five shows in a row.

Next to Hendrik Willemyns and John Roan, Arsenal’s live band consists of Leonie Gysel, Mirko Banovic, Dirk Loots, Matthias Bastiaens, and Jan Roelkens. A notable previous member of the live band is Bruno Fevery, who was contacted by John Garcia to join Kyuss Lives! and later Vista Chino after Garcia had joined Arsenal for a series of shows.

== Discography ==
- Oyebo Soul (2003)
- Outsides (2005)
- De Poolreizigers (Soundtrack, 2007)
- Lotuk (2008)
- Lokemo (2011)
- Furu (2014)
- In the Rush of Shaking Shoulders (2018)
- The Rhythm of the Band (2021)
- Okan Okunkun (2025)
