= Juan Ramón =

Juan Ramón may refer to:

- Juan Ramón (singer) (1940–2020), Argentine singer and actor
- Juan Ramón (footballer, born 1912) (1912–1999), Spanish footballer
- Juan Ramón (footballer, born 1987), Spanish footballer
