= Vista Chino =

American rock band

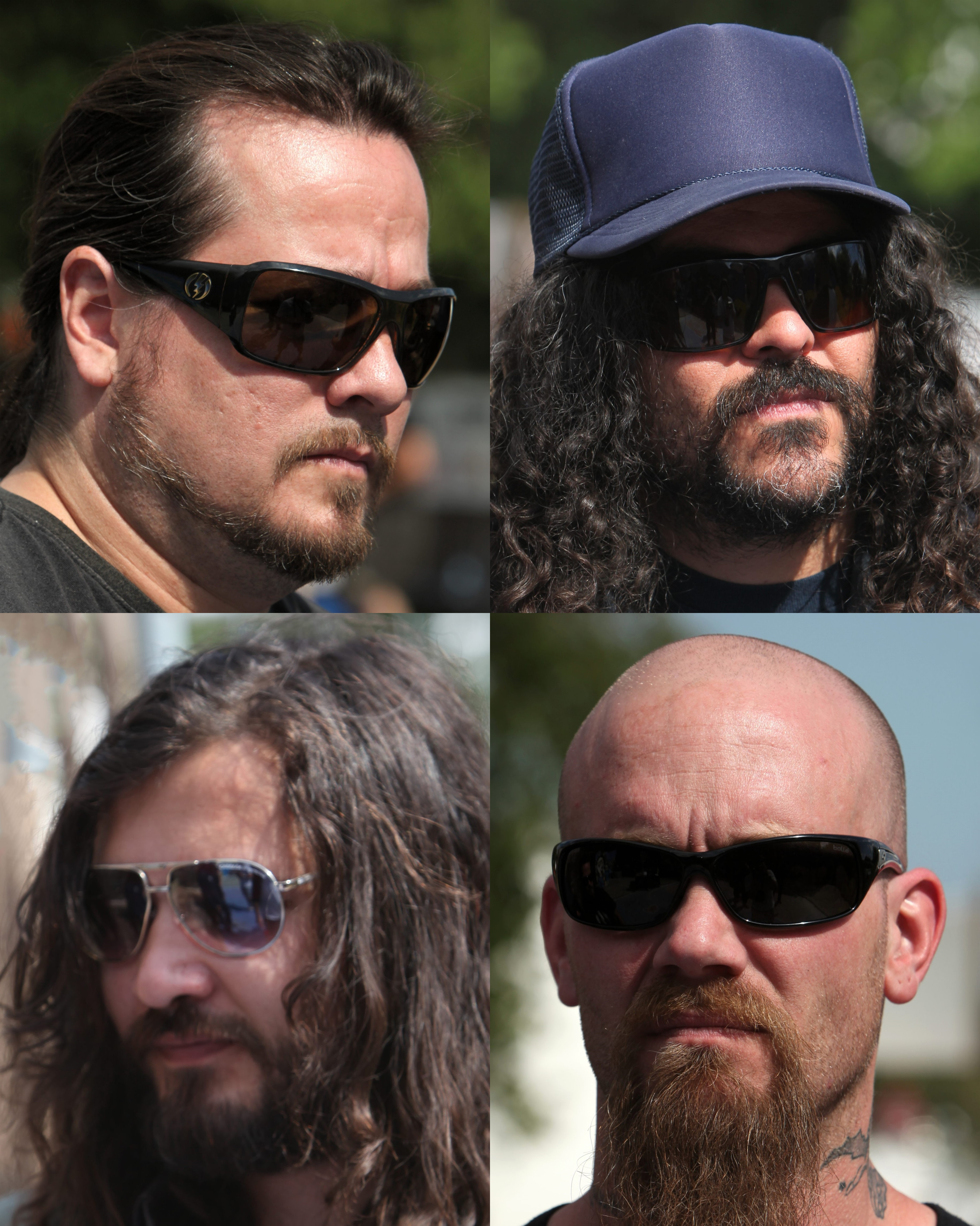
- The band's original lineup in 2011; clockwise from top left: John Garcia, Brant Bjork, Nick Oliveri and Bruno Fevery

Background information
- Also known as: Kyuss Lives! (2010–2013)
- Origin: Los Angeles, California, U.S.
- Genres: Stoner rock; desert rock
- Years active: 2010–2014
- Label: Napalm
- Spinoffs: Stöner
- Spinoff of: Kyuss; Slo Burn; Unida; Hermano; Mondo Generator
- Past members: John Garcia; Brant Bjork; Bruno Fevery; Nick Oliveri
- Website: vistachinomusic.com

Vista Chino was an American rock band formed in 2010 by vocalist John Garcia, drummer Brant Bjork and bassist Nick Oliveri, all previously members of Kyuss, along with guitarist Bruno Fevery.

The band formed under the name Kyuss Lives! as a short-lived venture touring the music of the original Kyuss, with a lineup excluding Josh Homme. In 2012, the band announced plans to continue touring indefinitely and begin work on a studio album using the Kyuss Lives! moniker. However, a lawsuit by Homme and former Kyuss bassist Scott Reeder prohibited the use of the name for recordings, prompting the band to rename themselves Vista Chino. After a tour and one album, Peace, Vista Chino broke up in 2014 when Garcia and Bjork supported solo releases.

== History ==
=== Formation and touring (2010–2011) ===
In 2010, a European "John Garcia plays Kyuss" tour was announced, starting with a gig at Roadburn Festival. His backing-band was composed of Belgian and Dutch musicians from Agua de Annique, Kong, Celestial Season and Arsenal. The setlists were almost exclusively Kyuss songs.

In June 2010, former Kyuss members Nick Oliveri and Brant Bjork joined John Garcia onstage to perform "Green Machine" and "Gardenia" during a headlining appearance by "Garcia Plays Kyuss" at Hellfest in Clisson, France and they also appeared onstage with Garcia in other concerts on the tour, representing 3/4 of Kyuss' Blues for the Red Sun lineup.

In November 2010, Garcia, Oliveri and Bjork announced a European tour under the moniker "Kyuss Lives!", with Bruno Fevery serving as the band's guitarist. In reference to the new band name, Garcia stated that "there is never going to be a Kyuss without Josh Homme" and that "hopefully in the future him and I can get together and do some writing."

They toured Australia and New Zealand in May. They toured Europe in June 2011 and announced a North and South America tour for late Summer and Fall, 2011, with Scott Reeder playing many dates outside of the United States. The tour wrapped up on New Year's Eve 2011 at Cherry Cola's Rock 'n' Rolla Cabaret and Lounge, Toronto, Ontario, Canada. Kyuss Lives! planned to record a new studio album for a summer 2012 release.

=== Lawsuit (2012–2013) ===
In March 2012, it was revealed that Josh Homme and bassist Scott Reeder had filed a federal lawsuit against John Garcia and Brant Bjork alleging "trademark infringement and consumer fraud" over the use of the Kyuss name. Nick Oliveri left Kyuss later that month, stating managerial issues and was replaced by Billy Cordell.

Bjork spoke to Rolling Stone magazine about the bitterness which has developed between Homme and his former Kyuss bandmates:

"Josh filing this lawsuit is not an issue of today ... it's an issue that began over 20 years ago. That is why the band was short-lived. Josh and I were the creative force within the band and after the completion of our second record, Blues for the Red Sun, we developed an opposing view on how the band should exist and operate. In 1992 Josh discovered publishing, which is the financial revenue stream for songwriting. After that, he wanted to write all the songs. As a drummer I couldn't make him play my songs. I wasn't going to compromise my heart and soul and play drums for Josh to make money in a band I started. So I left the band. I was a confused, angry and sad 19-year-old idealist who sacrificed my love of my band for what I believed in. Two-and-a-half years later, Josh would break up the band after John (Garcia) confronted him about the same thing; his need to control the band for personal gain."

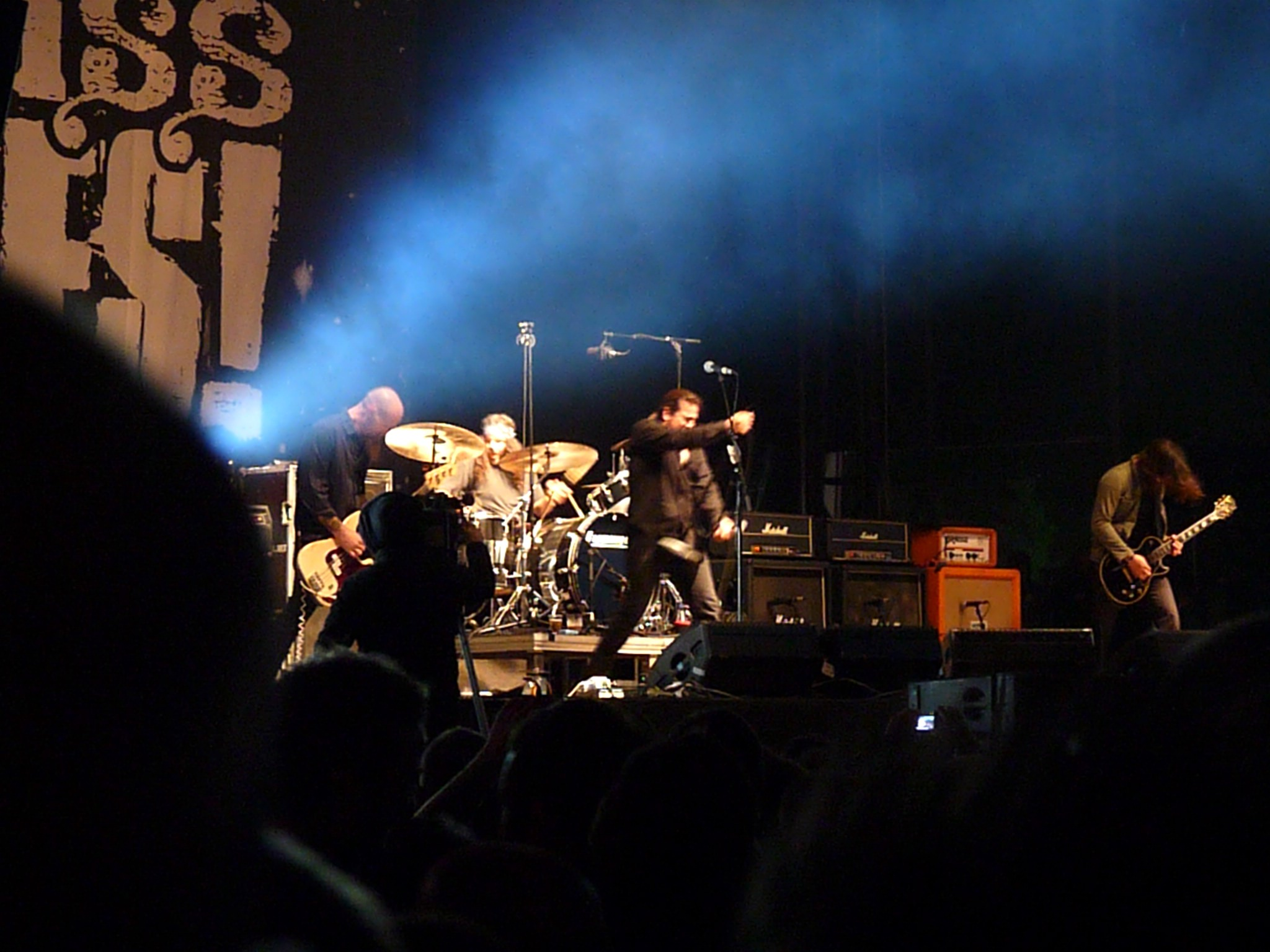
Kyuss Lives! onstage in 2011

In August 2012, Judge S. James Otero of the United States District Court Central District of California ruled partly in Homme's favor, declaring that Garcia and Bjork could not release audio recordings under the Kyuss Lives! moniker and encouraging them to re-brand under a new name. However, the band scored a partial victory as the court ruling permitted the band to use the Kyuss Lives! name and logo for performances and promotional materials, provided the words "Kyuss" and "Lives" were printed in "equally-prominent lettering." The band renamed themselves in response.

The name Vista Chino refers to a street of the same name in the city of Palm Springs, California. The name of the street (Spanish for 'Chino view') in turn refers to the Chino Canyon, which is part of the San Jacinto Mountains southwest of Palm Springs, and which lies directly in line of this street. The San Jacinto mountains are a prominent mountain range forming the southwest border of the Coachella Valley, the desert valley part of the Sonoran Desert, where Palm Springs and Palm Desert (of the famous Palm Desert Scene) are located. John Garcia said about the band name:

"I'm proud of the desert. I call it my desert. I love this place. Kyuss was proud of it as well as Vista Chino. We named the band after the street that goes from Palm Springs to Cathedral City."

In November 2012, Nick Oliveri announced that he would be rejoining Kyuss Lives!. Kyuss Lives! played their final performances under that name at the Soundwave Festivals in 2013. However, Mike Dean played bass on all the 2013 Soundwave shows and sidewaves. Oliveri has not been seen to actively participate with the band since, having not appeared in recent photoshoots or toured with the band, and Dean has been acting as the band's touring and session bassist, having played one track on the band's album, Peace. In August 2013, singer John Garcia said that Vista Chino "is a three-piece band with [himself], Brant [Bjork, drummer] and Bruno [Fevery, guitarist]. It always will be." but also described Oliveri as "an honorary band member".

=== Peace and break-up (2013–2014) ===
On May 23, 2013, it was announced that Vista Chino had signed with Napalm Records. That same day a new song, "Dargona Dragona," was posted on the band's SoundCloud page. Their debut album, Peace, was released on September 3, 2013. Guest appearances included Mike Dean on "As You Wish" and Chris Cockrell on "The Gambling Moose." The album peaked at #14 on the Billboard Heatseekers Album chart.

In an interview with About.com, John Garcia spoke of the band's recent success and possibilities for the future.

"I think a lot of people, especially Josh Homme and Scott Reeder, expected us to fail, and we didn't. We're here at the other end. This is where we're supposed to be. It just took us a little bit longer to get here, and we're in a good spot. The tour is starting. We're going to be on the road up until the end of next summer, and there's already talk about another record."

The first show played under the new moniker was on June 9, 2013, at the Orion Music and More Festival.

In October 2014, former bassist Nick Oliveri claimed that the band had broken up due to a falling out that led to Garcia leaving the band. During this period, Bjork and Garcia decided to continue their solo careers, with Garcia releasing an eponymous debut album and Bjork releasing an album with his new backing band, the Low Desert Punk Band. Garcia had denied the falling out earlier, stating, "There was never any breakup or any bad blood, it was just really me wanting to get this monkey off my back with my solo record." When asked whether there would be a second album, Garcia replied, "I doubt if there'll be another Vista Chino record. I seriously, seriously doubt it." However, the band has remained active on social media, and on December 31, posted a picture of Garcia and Bjork, and teased a new album for 2015. No further announcements of a second studio album have been made since.

== Band members ==
Former

- John Garcia – lead vocals (2010–2014)
- Bruno Fevery – guitar (2010–2014)
- Brant Bjork – drums (2010–2014)
- Nick Oliveri – bass, backing vocals (2010 – March 2012, November–December 2012)

Touring

- Scott Reeder – bass (select shows in 2011)
- Billy Cordell – bass (March–November 2012)
- Mike Dean – bass (2013–2014)

== Discography ==
- Peace (2013, Napalm Records)
