= Batmobile (disambiguation) =

The Batmobile is the vehicle used by Batman.

Batmobile may also refer to:

- Batmobile (band), a psychobilly group
- A racing version of the BMW 3.0CSL as driven in the European Touring Car Championship of the 1970s
- "Batmobile", the name of an episode of The Drew Carey Show
