= Amusing the Amazing =

EP by Slo Burn
- Released: April 15, 1997
- Recorded: September 5–9, 1996
- Studios: Sound City Studios in Van Nuys and Hollywood, California
- Genres: Stoner rock; desert rock
- Length: 15:48
- Label: Malicious Vinyl
- Producers: Chris Goss; Slo Burn

Alternative cover
- Cover of vinyl reissue

Professional ratings
Review scores
Source	Rating
AllMusic	2.5/5 stars
Chronicles of Chaos	9/10

Amusing the Amazing is an EP by the American stoner rock band Slo Burn. It was released on April 15, 1997. The EP contains four songs, and sounds very much in the vein of Kyuss, of stoner rock fame, partly due to having been co-produced by Chris Goss, who also produced much of the music of Kyuss, and partly due to the presence of John Garcia, formerly of Kyuss, on vocals.

== Track listing ==
All tracks are written by Slo Burn.

No.	Title	Length
1.	"The Prizefighter"	2:16
2.	"Muezli"	5:12
3.	"Pilot the Dune"	3:28
4.	"July"	4:51

Later unofficial releases of this EP had added tracks from their earlier five track demo. The quality of these extra tracks is inferior to the normal EP. These tracks are:

Five track demo
No.	Title	Length
5.	"Wheel Fall"	4:08
6.	"Positiva"	4:25
7.	"Cactus Jumper"	2:58
8.	"Round Trip"	2:29
9.	"Snake Hips"	3:49

=== Notes ===
- "Cactus Jumper" has since been re-recorded and was officially released on John Garcia's 2014 solo album as "All These Walls".

== Personnel ==
Slo Burn

- John Garcia – vocals
- Chris Hale – guitars
- Damon Garrison – bass
- Brady Houghton – drums

Additional personnel

- Martin Schmelzle – engineer
- Ralph Cacciurri – assistant engineer
- Greg Fiddlman – assistant engineer
- Kevin Estrada – band photographer
