= Jon García =

Jon García may refer to:

- Jon García (taekwondo) (born 1977), Spanish taekwondo athlete
- Jon García (footballer) (born 1991), Spanish footballer
- Jon Garcia (director) (born 1979), American director, documentary filmmaker, screenwriter and musician

== See also ==
- Jonathan Garcia (born 1986), American speed skater
- John Garcia (disambiguation)
