= Into the Exam Room =

...Into the Exam Room

Studio album by Hermano
- Released: October 22, 2007 (Europe)
- Genre: Stoner rock
- Length: 43:42
- Label: Suburban Records (Europe); Regain Records (North America)

Hermano chronology
Dare I Say... (2004)	...Into the Exam Room (2007)

Professional ratings
Review scores
Source	Rating
About.com	4/5 stars

...Into the Exam Room is the third studio album from U.S. stoner rock group Hermano. The LP was released in Europe on October 22, 2007, and early 2008 in North America.

== Track listing ==
No.	Title	Writer(s)	Length
1.	"Kentucky"	John Garcia, David Angstrom	3:23
2.	"Exam Room"	Garcia, Angstrom	3:09
3.	"Dark Horse II"	Garcia, Dandy Brown	4:49
4.	"Left Side Bleeding"	Garcia, Mike Callahan	2:53
5.	"Out of Key, But in the Mood"	Garcia	4:30
6.	"Hard Working Wall"	Garcia	3:57
7.	"Bona-Fide"	Garcia, Brown	3:55
8.	"Don't Call Your Mama"	Garcia, Brown	4:19
9.	"Adoption Boy"	Garcia, Brown	2:43
10.	"At the Bar"	Brown	4:43
11.	"Our Desert Home"	Callahan	3:25
12.	"Letters from Madrid"		1:56

== Personnel ==
Band

- John Garcia – vocals
- David Angstrom – guitar
- Mike Callahan – guitar
- Dandy Brown – bass
- Chris Leathers – drums

Additional personnel

- Steve Feldman – additional vocals on all tracks except "Hard Working Wall" and "At the Bar"
- Robbie Waldman – vocals on "Hard Working Wall" and "At the Bar"
- Evan Angstrom – talk box on "Exam Room", vocals on "Letters from Madrid"
- Audrey Angstrom – vocals on "Letters from Madrid"
