= Sex Starved =

Studio album by Batmobile
- Released: 1991
- Recorded: August–September 1990
- Genre: Psychobilly
- Length: 33:54
- Label: Count Orlok Records
- Producer: Batmobile

Batmobile chronology
Is Dynamite (1990)	Sex Starved (1991)	Hard Hammer Hits (1992)

Sex Starved is the seventh album by Dutch psychobilly band Batmobile. It was recorded August–September 1990 at the Commodore Studio, Zelhem, the Netherlands, and released in 1991 on Count Orlock Records.

== Track listing ==
1. "Uranium Love" (Jeroen Haamers) – 2:41
2. "S.P.O.C.K" (J. Haamers) – 1:31
3. "King's Evil" (J. Haamers) – 1:59
4. "Rock This Planet" (J. Haamers) – 2:41
5. "Can't Stop This Rock" (Eric Haamers, J. Haamers) – 2:26
6. "Roll On" (E. Haamers) – 3:03
7. "Police At The Door" (E. Haamers) – 2:04
8. "Haemorrhoid Rock" (E. Haamers) – 2:40
9. "Sex Starved" (E. Haamers) – 3:34
10. "In Orbit" (E. Haamers) – 2:09
11. "The Living Have More Fun" (J. Haamers) – 2:16
12. "Rockin' Rooster" (J. Haamers) – 2:29
13. "Mean Ugly Mama" (J. Haamers) – 2:16
14. "Give Me Some Pussy" (J. Haamers) – 2:15

== Personnel ==
- Jeroen Haamers – lead vocals, guitar
- Eric Haamers – double bass
- Johnny Zuidhof – drums
- Pieter M. Dorrenboom - cover design
- Dick "Hardrockabilly" Kemper - engineering
