= Dare I Say =

Dare I Say...

Studio album by Hermano
- Released: November 8th 2004
- Studio: Various: Berkley Park Studio, Atlanta, Georgia, U.S.; Cabana Recordings, Boca Raton, Florida, U.S.; Unit A Studio, Palm Springs, California, U.S.; Feldman Studio, Palm Springs, California, U.S.; Butter Studio, Joshua Tree, California, U.S.; Aspen Heights Studio, Morongo Valley, California, U.S.
- Genre: Stoner metal
- Length: 43:53
- Label: MeteorCity
- Producer: Hermano & Ram Lauwrier

Hermano chronology
...Only a Suggestion (2002)	Dare I Say... (2004)	...Into the Exam Room (2007)

Professional ratings
Review scores
Source	Rating
AllMusic	4/5 stars

Dare I Say... is the second studio album by stoner rock band Hermano. It was released on the MeteorCity label and produced by the band and executive producer Ram Lauwrier. Since the band members lived in different locations, the album was recorded in various studios.

== Track listing ==
No.	Title	Length
1.	"Cowboys Suck"	3:46
2.	"Life"	4:16
3.	"Roll Over"	4:42
4.	"Brother Bjork"	5:13
5.	"Is This OK?"	5:26
6.	"Quite Fucked"	2:38
7.	"Murder One"	4:09
8.	"My Boy"	3:13
9.	"Let's Get It On"	3:24
10.	"On The Desert"	3:48
11.	"Angry American"	3:14

== Personnel ==
Band

- John Garcia – vocals
- David Angstrom – guitar, vocals
- Dandy Brown – bass, additional guitars, organ
- Chris Leathers – drums

Additional personnel

- Aleah X – additional vocals on "Quite Fucked", "Let's Get It On"
- Steve Feldman – additional vocals on "Roll Over", "Is This O.K.?", "Brother Bjork", "Murder One", "Angry American"
- Mark Engel – guitar on "Murder One"
- Eric Belt – guitar on "Angry American" and "Life"

Mixing

- James Salter, Berkley Park Studio, Atlanta, Georgia, USA
- Jacques De Haard, Waterfront Studios, Rotterdam, Netherlands

Mastering

- Alan Ward, Electric City, Brussels, Belgium

== Notes ==
The album was recorded across multiple studios due to the band members living in differing locations.
