= Bruno Fevery =

Belgian guitarist

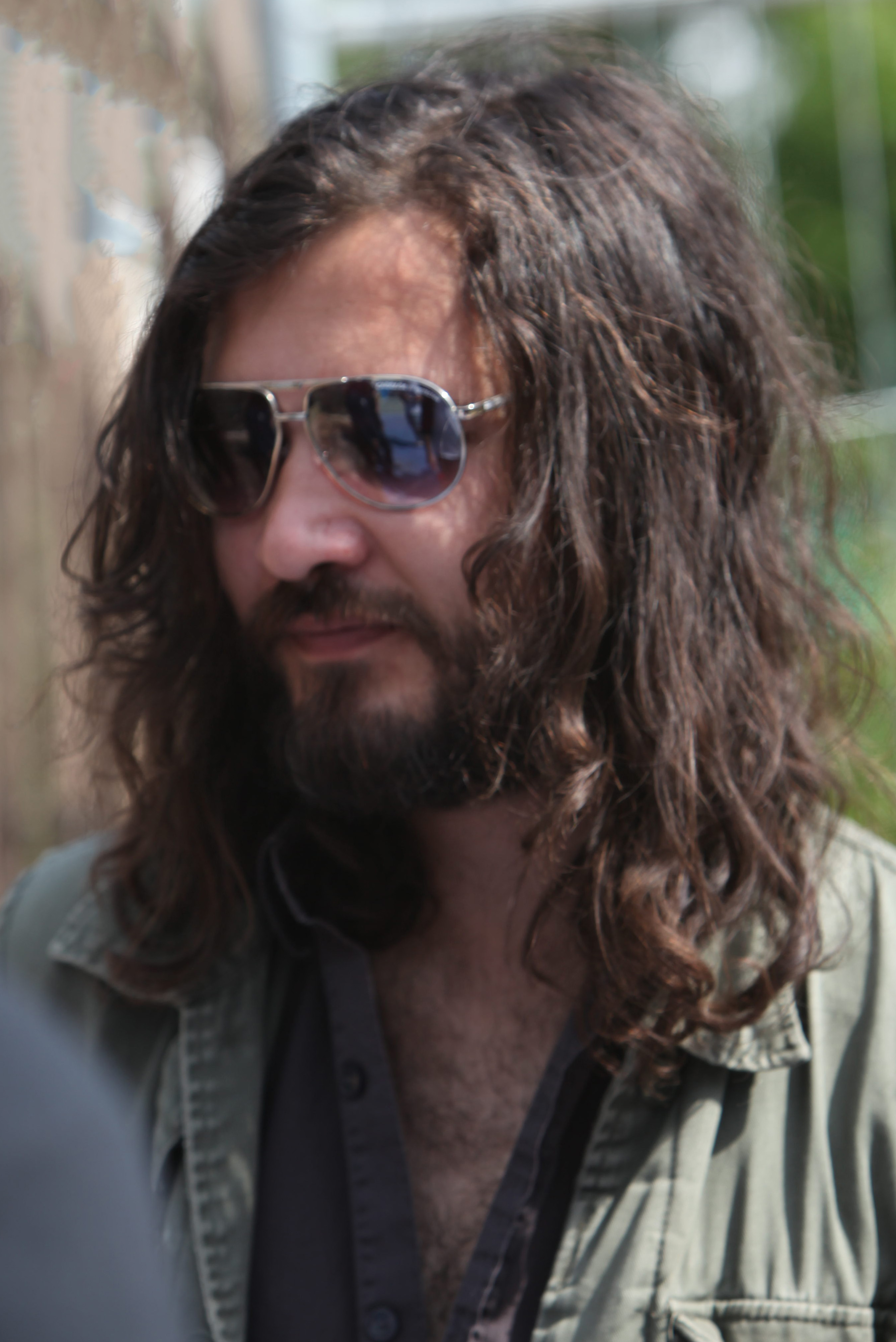
- Fevery in 2011

Background information
- Born: 6 June 1977 (age 48)
- Genres: Rock; stoner rock; electronic
- Occupation: Musician
- Instrument: Guitar
- Years active: 1999–present
- Formerly of: Arsenal; Vista Chino

Bruno Fevery (born 6 June 1977) is a Belgian guitarist. He is best known as a member of the American rock band Vista Chino, formerly known as Kyuss Lives!, and the Belgian multi-genre band Arsenal.

== Musical career ==
Fevery met ex-Kyuss vocalist John Garcia when the singer recorded guest vocals on two songs for the Arsenal album Lotuk. After Garcia learned that he played in a Kyuss tribute band as a teenager, Fevery joined the singer on his "Garcia Plays Kyuss" tour. He later joined Garcia, Brant Bjork and Nick Oliveri in the band Kyuss Lives! as a guitarist. Following a lawsuit filed by former-Kyuss members Josh Homme and Scott Reeder, Kyuss Lives! changed their name to Vista Chino. The band released the studio album Peace in 2013, with Fevery and Bjork writing nearly all of the album's music, before breaking up in late 2014.

== Discography ==
- Helmut Lotti – Out of Africa (1999)
- Helmut Lotti – "Shosholoza" Single (1999)
- Arsenal – Outsides (2005)
- Stash – Blue Lanes (2007)
- Baloji – Hotel Impala (2007)
- Arsenal – Outsides EP (2007)
- Arsenal – De Poolreizigers (2007)
- Les Talons Gitans – L′amour sans pédales (2007)
- Arsenal – Lotuk (2008)
- Monza – Attica! (2008)
- Meuris – Spectrum (2010)
- Les Talons Gitans – Vieil Indien (2010)
- Arno – Brussld (2010)
- Arsenal – Lokemo (2011)
- Vista Chino – Peace (2013)
- Nick Oliveri's Uncontrollable – Leave Me Alone (2014)
