= Poobah (band) =

American rock band

- Origin: Youngstown, Ohio, U.S.
- Genres: Rock; Psychedelic rock; Protometal; Hard rock
- Years active: 1972–present
- Labels: Ripple Music; Peppermint Productions; A.E.I. Records
- Members: Jim Gustafson - guitar, bass vocals; Mike Fortino - drums; Lori Powers - percussion, backup vocals; Important session & live musicians: Kevin McIlvaine - bass; Dan Tharp - bass
- Past members: Phil Jones - founding member; Glenn Wiseman - founding member; Gene Procopio; Ken Smetzer; Judd Gaylord; Ralph Haring; Gus Theophilos; Woody Hupp; Joe Mowery; Greg Jones; George DiGiovanni; Mike Lewis; Paul Zyla
- Website: poobahband.com

Poobah are a rock band from Youngstown, Ohio, U.S., which was founded in 1972 by Jim Gustafson. The band played classic 70s rock or simply rock. Especially the first record Let Me In is a rare collector's item. Prices between $300 and $900 for an original are not uncommon. Poobah released a total of 14 albums from 1972 to 2020. The band gained more popularity through the use of their songs in the television series Graves and the Hollywood film Josie.

== History ==
=== The beginnings ===
Jim Gustafson was the guitarist and singer in the band Daze Endz in 1967. In 1968, at the age of 15, he recorded his first record, the single "What Can I Do?" / "Knock On Wood". He wrote and sang the songs and played electric guitar. Phil Jones, later founding member of Poobah, played bass on the recording.

From 1969 to 1972, Gustafson was the guitarist and singer in the band Biggy Rat. His second single, "Look Inside Yourself / I'm A Woman" was produced in Memphis Tennessee by Billy Cox, the bassist with the recently deceased Jimi Hendrix. Other members of the band were Scott Hunter, Gary Dipasquale, Shirliann Shank, later Steve Rohrbaugh and Frank Amedia. Biggyrat supported Cheech & Chong, Ted Nugent, Alice Cooper, Sugarloaf and others.

After Gustafson left Biggy Rat, he formed the hard rock trio Poobah with bassist Phil Jones and drummer Glenn Wiseman. The band's name derived from the nickname of a feared girl at Gustafson's school. In 1972, Gustafson used a small inheritance from his grandmother to record the album Let Me In in Peppermint Studio, Youngstown, Ohio. The album had great success on local radio stations. The first pressing of 500 copies, sold out in one day by National Record Mart.

=== First changes of line-up and temporary disbanding ===
After disputes with Gustafson, Wiseman left the band in 1973 and was replaced by sixteen-year-old Steve Schwelling. Wiseman later returned to the band, but soon left again and was replaced by Nick Gligor. The new line-up was working on the next album while they did tours and shows with Ted Nugent, Canned Heat, Alice Cooper, ZZ Top, Blue Öyster Cult, Spirit, Uriah Heep, Mitch Ryder, Glass Harp, The Godz, Foghat, Tim Curry, Judas Priest, Eddie Money, James Gang, Cheech & Chong, Brownsville Station, Mark Lindsay, Mark Chatfield, Sugarloaf and others. In 1974, Nick Gligor and guitarist Pat O'Horo left Poobah, to form their own band. New members were drummer Gene Procopio and keyboardist Ken Smetzer, who added Hammond organ to the sound of Poobah. The band also made several appearances on television during this period. The album U.S. Rock was recorded in 1976 with the record company A.E.I. Records. Camelot Music Distribution, who had already sold their entire stock of Poobah records, pre-ordered 5,000 copies of the new album. Poobah, preoccupied with touring, noticed too late that A.E.I. Records was in financial trouble. As a result of the bankruptcy of their record company, Poobah disbanded in 1978. Jim Gustafson played in other bands, but no records were released in that time.

=== New start ===
Jim Gustafson and Phil Jones re-established Poobah in 1979. There were several line-up changes since then. In 1979, the album Steamroller was released, the last album on vinyl until later re-issues. In the following years Jim Gustafson founded or joined several short-lived bands, including "Switch", where he produced the single "Eye To Eye" in 1986. In 1994, Gustafson produced the CD The Rock Collection. It is the first CD produced by Poobah, more releases and personnel changes followed. The drummer Mike Fortino, whose first album with Poobah is the CD Peace Farmers, remains a member of the band to this day. Other long-time players are bassists Kevin Mc Illvaine and Dan Tharp.

=== New popularity ===
In 2010, Poobah signed a deal with the Ripple Music label. The first album Let Me In was remixed by Tony Reed (Stone Axe / Mos Generator) and reissued as CD and double album on vinyl with previously unreleased bonus material from 1972-73. The album received good reviews and high recognition. The Rolling Stone magazine e.g. added Let Me In to the "Top Ten Albums Of The Year". The Goldmine music collector magazine named the album "Reissue Pick Of The Year" and Poobah "One of the world's most collectable psych rock bands". The Goldmine magazine also featured an interview with Poobah in April 2021. London's Shindig! magazine wrote a positive review of "Let Me in" in its 2018 summer issue. Poobah tracks are played in several company productions. The Hollywood movie "Between Us" uses the title "Frustration" from the album Steamroller in 2016. In 2017 "Enjoy What You Have" from the LP Let Me In is used in the TV series Graves with Nick Nolte and introduced the band to a larger audience. The 2018 Hollywood film Josie with Sophie Turner uses the title "Enjoy What You Have" from the album Let Me In. The film Youngstown: Still Standing uses five titles by Poobah. In 2020, the band Monster Magnet released a cover version of Poobah's "Mr. Destroyer" on their album A Better Dystopia. Poobah produced the CD Blue in 2018 and Evolver)Revlove in 2020. The release of another album on CD and LP has been announced.

== Members ==
=== Founding members ===
- Jim Gustafson - guitar, bass, vocals
- Phil Jones - bass, vocals
- Glenn Wiseman - drums

=== Current line-up ===
- Jim Gustafson - guitar, bass, vocals
- Mike Fortino - drums
- Lori Powers - percussion, backup vocals

=== Important live- and session musicians ===
- Kevin McIlvaine - bass
- Dan Tharp - bass

=== Past members ===
- Gene Procopio
- Ken Smetzer
- Judd Gaylord
- Ralph Haring
- Gus Theophilos
- Woody Hupp
- Joe Mowery
- Greg Jones
- George DiGiovanni
- Patrick OHoro
- Mike Lewis

== Poobah and comic art ==
The cover art of the album Let Me In shows a character in the style of american underground comix of the late 1960s. The illustrator Jack Joyce made the drawing after Jim Gustafson had told him about his love of comics.

Larry Blake, known for his comics about the band Kiss made for Marvel, created drawings for Poobah, an illustration for Steamroller and an alternative cover for the album U.S. Rock.

Band founder Jim Gustafson and other members of the band appear as characters in the Webcomic "Theater Of The Bloody Tongue" together with a witch called Ariane Eldar and many rockstars from other bands. Jim Gustafson had his first appearance in chapter XII. "The great vinyl-cover-romance". The webcomic containing the episodes with Poobah also appeared later as paperbacks.

== Discography ==
=== Albums (vinyl) ===
- 1972: Let Me In
- 1976: U.S. Rock
- 1979: Steamroller
- 2024: Burning In The Rain An Anthology

=== Singles (vinyl) ===
- 1973: "Rock City" / "Bowleen"
- 1975: "Your Way, My Way" / "Let's Rock"
- 1976: "Through These Eyes" / "Watch Me!"

=== CD ===
- 1989: Switch On
- 1994: The Rock Collection
- 1998: Wizard Of Psych
- 1999: Steamroller: Reissue
- 2004: Furious Love
- 2005: Underground
- 2007: No Control
- 2007: Live At The Cleveland Rock'n Roll Hall Of Fame
- 2010: Peace Farmers
- 2010: Let Me In: Reissue
- 2011: Compilation After and Before
- 2014: Cosmic Rock
- 2015: US Rock: Reissue
- 2018: Blue
- 2020: Evolver/Revlove
- 2024: Burning In The Rain An Anthology
