= Peace (Vista Chino album) =

Studio album by Vista Chino
- Released: September 3, 2013
- Studios: Jalamanta Studios, Joshua Tree, California
- Genres: Stoner rock; heavy metal
- Length: 57:22
- Labels: Napalm; 3Wise (Australia)
- Producer: Brant Bjork

Peace is the only album by American rock band Vista Chino. It features three former members of Kyuss (Brant Bjork, Nick Oliveri and John Garcia), along with new guitarist Bruno Fevery. It was released on September 3, 2013, by Napalm Records.

The album peaked at No. 14 on the Billboard Heatseekers Album chart.

== Background ==
Originally known as Kyuss Lives!, the band changed their name after a lawsuit from Josh Homme and Scott Reeder prevented them from using the Kyuss Lives! name for recordings.

Guest appearances on Peace include Mike Dean of Corrosion of Conformity and former Kyuss bassist Chris Cockrell who appear on one track each.

Napalm Records released the record on 2xLP in colored versions of red, green, blue, orange, gold, bone and black, along with a limited edition digipak version of the CD featuring two bonus tracks.

Music videos were made for the songs "Sweet Remain" and "Barcelonian".

== Reception ==
Professional ratings
Review scores
Source	Rating
About.com	4/5 stars
Blabbermouth.net	8.5/10
CraveOnline	5/10
Exclaim!	8/10
Metal Hammer	4/7
MetalSucks	3.5/5 stars
PopMatters	6/10
The Rockpit	3.5/5 stars
The Sydney Morning Herald	4/5 stars
Ultimate Guitar	9.3/10

The Aquarian praised the album saying, "Peace not only captures much of what was so groundbreaking in Kyuss' approach, but expands the scope and gives a modern impression."

East Bay Express proclaimed "The dynamism between meandering, clean passages and desperately surging crunch is the best I've heard in a while."

Spin noted "Garcia and Bjork still have that Kyuss character in spades on their debut, Peace, writing bulldozing stoner anthems that live up to the legend of their former band."

Magnet Magazine placed Peace No. 1 on their best hard rock albums of 2013.

Brave Words & Bloody Knuckles writer Greg Prato selected "Peace" as No. 6 for his Top 10 of 2013 for "The Scribes Speak" poll.

== Track listing ==
All lyrics are written by John Garcia and Brant Bjork; all music is composed by Bruno Fevery and Bjork, except where noted.

No.	Title	Music	Length
1.	"Good Morning Wasteland"		0:59
2.	"Dargona Dragona"		4:47
3.	"Sweet Remain"		3:10
4.	"As You Wish"		5:01
5.	"Planets 1 & 2"		6:32
6.	"Adara"		4:39
7.	"Mas Vino"	Nick Oliveri, Fevery, Bjork	1:26
8.	"Dark and Lovely"		6:14
9.	"Barcelonian"		3:31
10.	"Acidize... The Gambling Moose"		13:00

Bonus tracks
No.	Title	Length
11.	"Carnation"	4:14
12.	"Sunlight at Midnight"	3:49

== Personnel ==
Credits adapted from the album's liner notes.

=== Vista Chino ===
- John Garcia – vocals
- Bruno Fevery – guitar
- Nick Oliveri – bass
- Brant Bjork – drums, percussion, backing vocals, lead vocals on "Planet 1", bass on "Planets 1 & 2"

=== Guest musicians ===
- Mike Dean – bass on "As You Wish"
- Tom Brayton – additional percussion
- Chris Cockrell (Vic Du Monte) – harmonica on "The Gambling Moose"

=== Production ===
- Brant Bjork – production
- Harper Hug and Trevor Whatever – engineering/mixing
- Adrian Medel – assistant engineer
- J.J. Golden – mastering
- The Date Farmers, Carlos Ramirez, and Armando Lerma – album artwork
- Alex Rauch – layout editing
- Richard Sibbald – photography

== Charts ==
Chart (2013)	Peak position
Austrian Albums (Ö3 Austria)	60
Belgian Albums (Ultratop Flanders)	47
Belgian Albums (Ultratop Wallonia)	111
Dutch Albums (Album Top 100)	67
Finnish Albums (Suomen virallinen lista)	37
German Albums (Offizielle Top 100)	42
Swiss Albums (Schweizer Hitparade)	66
US Top Heatseekers	14
