= Peter Pan Speedrock =

Dutch rock band

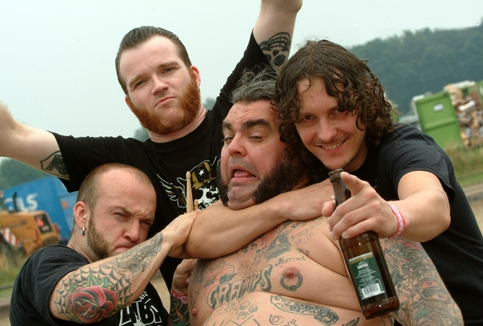
- Peter Pan Speedrock at Graspop 2005 with mascot Dikke Dennis; Picture: Rudy de Doncker

Background information
- Origin: Eindhoven, Netherlands
- Genres: Punk rock, hard rock, psychobilly
- Years active: 1997–2016
- Labels: Suburban Records, Bitzcore Records
- Members: Peter van Elderen; Bart Nederhand; Bart Geevers
- Past members: Bob Muileboom
- Website: official website

Peter Pan Speedrock (PPS or PPSR in short) is a Dutch punk rock band from Eindhoven, Netherlands.

== Background ==
The band was founded in 1995 by guitarist Peter van Elderen. He was joined by drummer Bart Nederhand and bass player Bob Muileboom in making their first self-titled album. After this album, Muileboom was replaced by Bart Geevers, who would stay to be a permanent member. The trio was known for their honest, no-nonsense rock n' roll songs and had a good reputation when it comes to live shows. They were often joined by guest singer and stage clown 'Dikke Dennis' (Fat Dennis). Peter Pan Speedrock grew to be an established name in the Dutch rock n' roll scene. On 26 November 2016, after 20 years of band history, they ended their career with a farewell concert at the concert venue Effenaar in Eindhoven, with a sold out show. On 14 September 2021, the band announced their return to the stage.

== Discography ==
- Peter Pan (1997)
- Rocketfuel (1998)
- Killermachine (2000)
- Premium Quality... Serve Loud! (2001)
- Lucky Bastards (2003)
- Spread Eagle (2005)
- Pursuit Until Capture (2007)
- We Want Blood! (2010)
- Buckle Up & Shove It! (2015)

== Others ==
- Home Steel 1999 (10" Vinyl)
- Eindhoven Rockcity 1999 (10" Vinyl Various Artists Compilation)
- "Action 2001" (7" vinyl single)
- Speedrock Chartbusters Vol.1 (Tribute CD/Vinyl)
- Loud, Mean, Fast and Dirty 2004 (Peter Pan Speedrock Compilation CD)
- Split 2005 (shared CD with Zeke)
- Cross Contamination 2008 (split album with Batmobile)

== Singles ==
- "Dikke Dennis & Friends" (2001)
- "Resurrection" (2002)
- "Go Satan Go"

== See also ==
- List of psychobilly bands
