= Exile Parade =

- Origin: Warrington, Cheshire, England
- Genres: Rock, hard rock
- Years active: 2006–2014
- Labels: Suburban
- Members: Daniel Lomax; Phil Hennessey; Chris Owen; Dave Hennessey; Gary Mutch

Exile Parade were an English rock band from Warrington, Cheshire.

== History ==
Exile Parade formed in the summer of 2006. After hearing the band's early demos on MySpace, producer Owen Morris and Oasis guitarist Paul "Bonehead" Arthurs went to see the band perform. They were signed by Dutch label Suburban Records, and played alongside artists such as Florence and the Machine, Cage the Elephant and Mystery Jets. Soon after, Exile Parade were working with Morris at Real World Studios. Rock writer Mick Middles called them "the most promising band to emerge in the last five years". In April 2008, the band's song "Fire Walk With Me" broke into the Mediabase Active Rock Top 100 in the U.S. They were the highest-placed British band in the chart that week. Suburban released "Fire Walk With Me" on limited edition 7" vinyl, and Dutch station 3VOOR12 made it their single of the week. The band played gigs in Amsterdam and at the Beeckestijn Festival. Local newspaper Haarlem Dagblad wrote, "The band sounded very tight with a huge sound, typically a band where you can say in a couple of years time just like Radiohead when they played the Beeckestijn Festival in 1993 - I was there!"

In March 2009, Exile Parade were featured in Beijing Today after picking up an online fanbase through Chinese social networking site Douban. "Fire Walk With Me" was also chosen as a cover track on a free CD given away with X-Music magazine. Total Guitar magazine made "Heart Into Suicide" one of top 20 downloads in their June edition, and Disorder magazine wrote: "The guitar licks are pleasingly heavy and deep, and singer Daniel Lomax has Liam Gallagher and Robert Plant sized aspirations sizzling through his blood. As long as they can side with the latter more than the former, they could be a new main stage pleaser in waiting." The band's debut EP, Brothel Ballet, was released in April 2010. The band followed this with a tour of China in May.

Exile Parade's debut studio album, Hit the Zoo, was released on 3 February 2012.

== In popular culture ==
- "Fire Walk With Me" is featured on the soundtrack of the first series DVD of Skins.
- "Love Disco" is featured in the Ben Stiller film Danny Roane: First Time Director.
- "Hit the Zoo" was used for the soundtrack of Netflix prison drama Screwed starring Noel Clarke and James D'Arcy.

== Discography ==
=== Studio albums ===
Year	Title
2012	Hit the Zoo

=== Extended plays ===
Year	Title
2010	Brothel Ballet
