= 2008 Men's Pan-American Volleyball Cup squads =

This article shows all participating team squads at the 2008 Men's Pan-American Volleyball Cup, held from June 2 to June 7, 2008, in Winnipeg, Manitoba, Canada.

== Canada ==
- Head Coach: Glenn Hoag

#	Name	Date of Birth	Height	Weight	Spike	Block
1	Louis-Pierre Mainville
2	Nicholas Cundy
5	Michael Munday
7	Dallas Soonias
10	Toontje Van Lankvelt
11	Gavin Schmitt
13	Mark Dodds
14	Adam Kaminski
15	Nicolas Quirion
16	Nathan Toews
17	Alexandre Gaumont
18	Richard Wilcox (c)

== Costa Rica ==
- Head Coach: Juan Acuña

#	Name	Date of Birth	Height	Weight	Spike	Block
2	Armando León Brenes
3	Hugo Castro Viquez
4	Esteban Rodríguez
5	Jeffery Calderón
7	Esteban Araya
8	Álvaro Cascante
9	Rafael Castro Cordero
11	Jorge White Bains
12	José Pablo Zumbado
13	Rafael Araya Rodríguez
14	Jorge Suárez Carrillo
15	Alexánder Villegas (c)

== Dominican Republic ==
- Head Coach: Jacinto Campechano

#	Name	Date of Birth	Height	Weight	Spike	Block
2	Germán Recio
3	Elvis Contreras (c)	16.05.1984	75	185	345	320
4	Franklin González
5	César Canario	10.10.1985	66	185	347	315
6	Hayden Reynoso
7	Eduardo Concepción	01.11.1983	92	195	346	316
9	Francisco Guerrero
11	José Miguel Cáceres	24.12.1981	96	210	361	340
12	José Castro	12.01.1981	87	185	336	312
15	Johan López Santos	16.04.1989	98	201	352	326
16	Víctor Batista	02.10.1979	90	199	350	340
18	Juan Carlos Cabrera

== Mexico ==
- Head Coach: Jorge Azair

#	Name	Date of Birth	Height	Weight	Spike	Block
1	Mario Becerra
2	Edgar Herrera
3	Francisco Enríquez
5	Pedro Rangel
6	Irving Bricio
9	Martín Petris
10	Ricardo Yepez
11	Juan García (c)
14	Tomás Aguilera
15	Leonardo Manzo
16	Jorge Barajas
18	David Alva

== Puerto Rico ==
- Head Coach: Ángel Rivera

#	Name	Date of Birth	Height	Weight	Spike	Block
2	Julio Acevedo (c)
3	Emanuel Batista
6	Angel Ruíz
7	Sequiel Sanchez
8	Jesus Martínez
9	Omar Rivera
10	Ulises Maldonado
11	Erick Haddock
13	Jackson Rivera
16	Jonathan King
17	Juan Figueroa
18	Edwin Aquino

== Trinidad and Tobago ==
- Head Coach: Augusto Sabbatini

#	Name	Date of Birth	Height	Weight	Spike	Block
1	Jessel Davis
2	Kevin Nimrod
4	Nolan Tash
6	Vaughn Martin
7	Mark Daly (c)
8	Saleem Ali
9	Christian Francois
10	Kevin Alleyne
11	Sean Morrison
14	Marc-Anthony Honoré
16	Russel Peña
17	Hollis Charles

== United States ==
- Head Coach: Alan Knipe

#	Name	Date of Birth	Height	Weight	Spike	Block
1	Matt Anderson	18.04.1987
4	Evan Patak	23.06.1984
5	Robert Tarr	09.01.1984
6	Matthew Proper	20.10.1983
7	Nathan Meerstein	13.11.1982
8	Jayson Jablonsky	23.07.1985
9	Jonathan Winder	04.01.1986
11	Tyler Hildebrand	28.02.1984
12	Andrew Hein (c)	01.07.1984
13	Nick Scheftic	25.11.1982
15	Paul Lotman	03.11.1985
19	Alfredo Reft	15.12.1982
