= Birth of Joy =

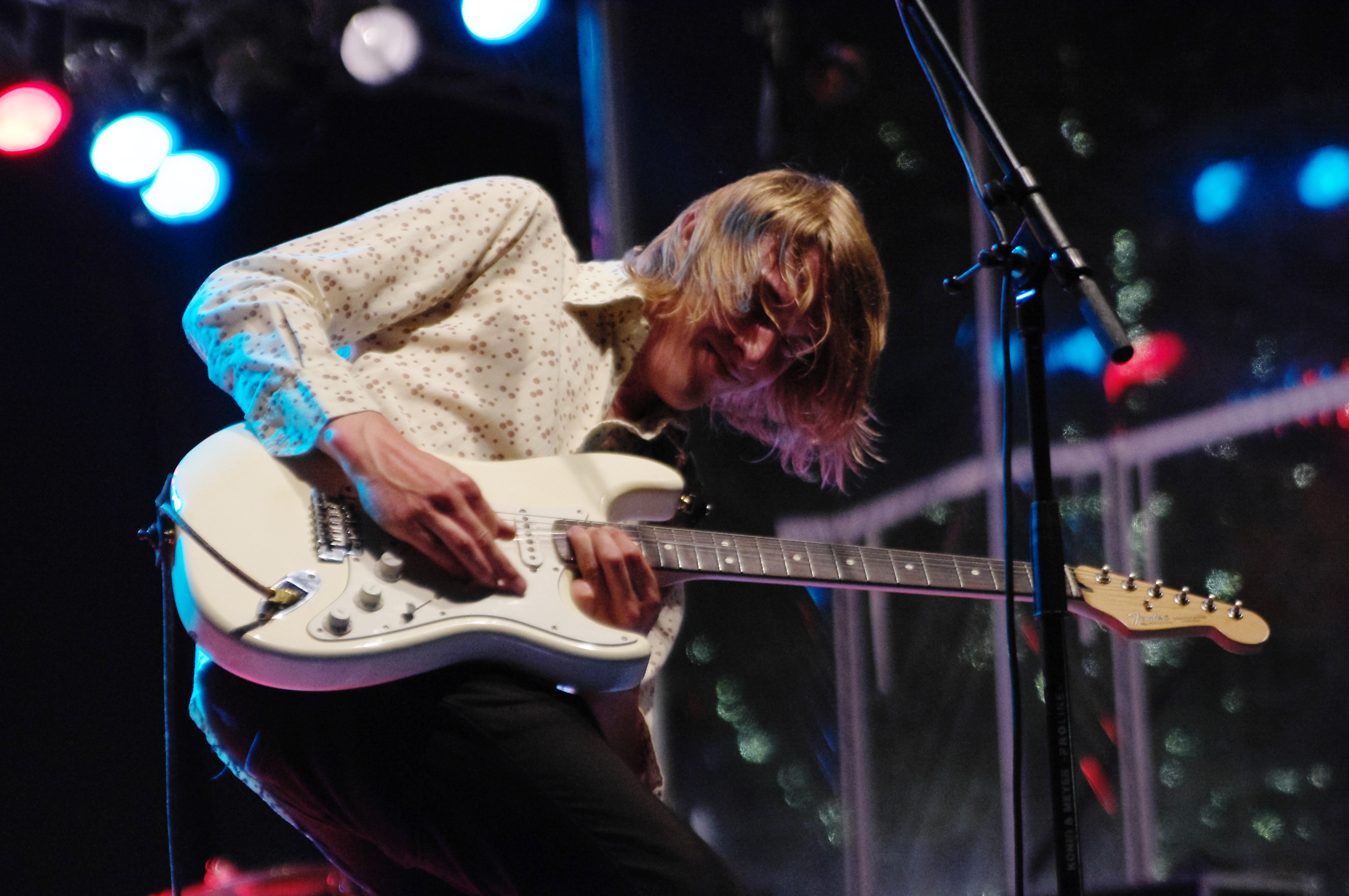
- Kevin Stunnenberg of Birth Of Joy in Enschede 2012

Background information
- Origin: Utrecht, Netherlands
- Genres: Psychedelic rock
- Years active: 2005–2018
- Label: Suburban Records
- Members: Kevin Stunnenberg; Bob Hogenelst; Gertjan Gutman
- Website: www.birthofjoy.com

Birth of Joy is a Dutch rock band, founded in 2005 at the Utrecht-based Herman Brood Academy. After many live concerts in the Netherlands, the band was signed by Dutch indie label Suburban Records following a performance at the Zwarte Cross Festival in 2011. After further shows at the Rencontres Trans Musicales in France and the Eurosonic Noorderslag festival in Groningen, supported by Rockpalast, the group became known outside the Netherlands. The band played their (provisional) last concert on 3 January 2019 in Paradiso, Amsterdam, after more than 1300 live performances in the Netherlands, Europe and the US.

== Music ==
The band's music is influenced by the blues and psychedelic rock scene of the late 1960s and early 1970s, but also borrowed from rock 'n' roll and boogie-woogie.

The band chose L'Ubu club in Rennes, France (city of the Rencontres Trans Musicales) to record a live album during two evenings (29 and 30 January 2015).

== Band name ==
The band's name is a reference to Friedrich Nietzsche's The Birth of Tragedy.

== Discography ==
- Make Things Happen (CD, 2010, self-published)
- Make Things Happen (EP, 2011 Suburban Records)
- Make Things Happen (CD, 2011, Suburban Records, new cover design)
- Life in Babalou (LP + CD, 2012 Suburban Records)
- The Sound of Birth of Joy (Compilation, CD, 2013, Modulor / Grand Palais)
- Prisoner (LP + CD, 2014, SPV/Long Branch, Suburban Records)
- Live at Ubu (3LP + 2CD, 2015)
- Get Well (LP + CD, 2016, Suburban Records)
- Hyper Focus (LP, 2018, Glitterhouse Records)
