= Juan García (footballer, born 1991) =

Argentine footballer

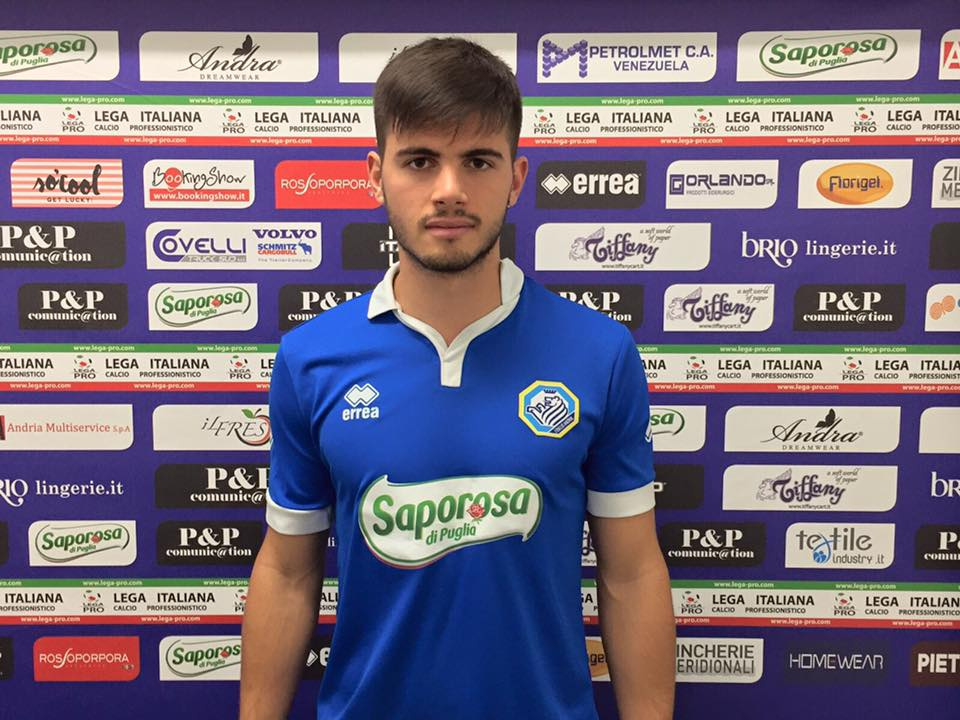

Personal information
- Full name: Juan Ezequiel García
- Date of birth: 9 October 1991 (age 35)
- Place of birth: Lomas de Zamora, Argentina
- Height: 1.79 m (5 ft 10 1/2 in)
- Position: Central midfielder

Youth career
- Banfield

Senior career*
Years	Team	Apps	(Gls)
2011–2015	Banfield	10	(0)
2015–2016	Fidelis Andria	3	(0)
2016	Dro	7	(0)
2018	Santamarina	0	(0)
2019	Atlético Porteño	25	(0)
2020	Bangor City		
- * Club domestic league appearances and goals

Juan Ezequiel García (born 9 October 1991) is an Argentine footballer who plays as a central midfielder.

== Career ==
García played for Banfield between 2011 and 2015. He first appeared on a teamsheet for Banfield on 30 November 2011, as an unused substitute in a Copa Argentina match against Atlético Paraná. His professional debut came just over a year later in a Primera B Nacional win against Crucero del Norte. Twelve further appearances followed across 2012–13, 2013–14 and 2014, with the last four coming in the Argentine Primera División. In November 2015, García left Argentine football to join Lega Pro side Fidelis Andria of Italian football. His debut came on 12 December versus Casertana. He left in July 2016 after just three appearances.

In late 2016, García had a short spell with Dro of Serie D. He made seven appearances prior to departing. He had trials with Alessandria and Reggina in August 2017. In July 2018, following a trial period, Santamarina signed García. Despite being on the substitutes bench for fixtures with Instituto and Temperley, García didn't play a competitive, senior game for Santamarina. García subsequently departed his homeland again in January 2019, completing a move to Atlético Porteño of the Ecuadorian Serie B. He left at the end of the year, after twenty-seven appearances in all competitions.

In August 2020, García headed to Wales with Cymru North team Bangor City. His debut arrived, belatedly due to the COVID-19 pandemic, on 12 December in a League Cup victory over Gresford Athletic.

== Career statistics ==
As of 21 September 2020.

Club statistics
Club	Season	League			Cup		League Cup		Continental		Other		Total	
Club	Season	Division	Apps	Goals	Apps	Goals	Apps	Goals	Apps	Goals	Apps	Goals	Apps	Goals
Banfield	2012–13	Primera B Nacional	3	0	2	0	—		—		0	0	5	0
Banfield	2013–14	Primera B Nacional	3	0	1	0	—		—		0	0	4	0
Banfield	2014	Primera División	4	0	0	0	—		—		0	0	4	0
Banfield	2015	Primera División	0	0	0	0	—		—		0	0	0	0
Banfield	Total		10	0	3	0	—		—		0	0	13	0
Fidelis Andria	2015–16	Lega Pro	3	0	0	0	0	0	—		0	0	3	0
Dro	2016–17	Serie D	7	0	0	0	0	0	—		0	0	7	0
Santamarina	2018–19	Primera B Nacional	0	0	0	0	—		—		0	0	0	0
Atlético Porteño	2019	Serie B	25	0	2	0	—		—		0	0	27	0
Career total			45	0	5	0	0	0	—		0	0	50	0

== Honours ==
Banfield

- Primera B Nacional: 2013–14
