= Hermano (band) =

American rock band

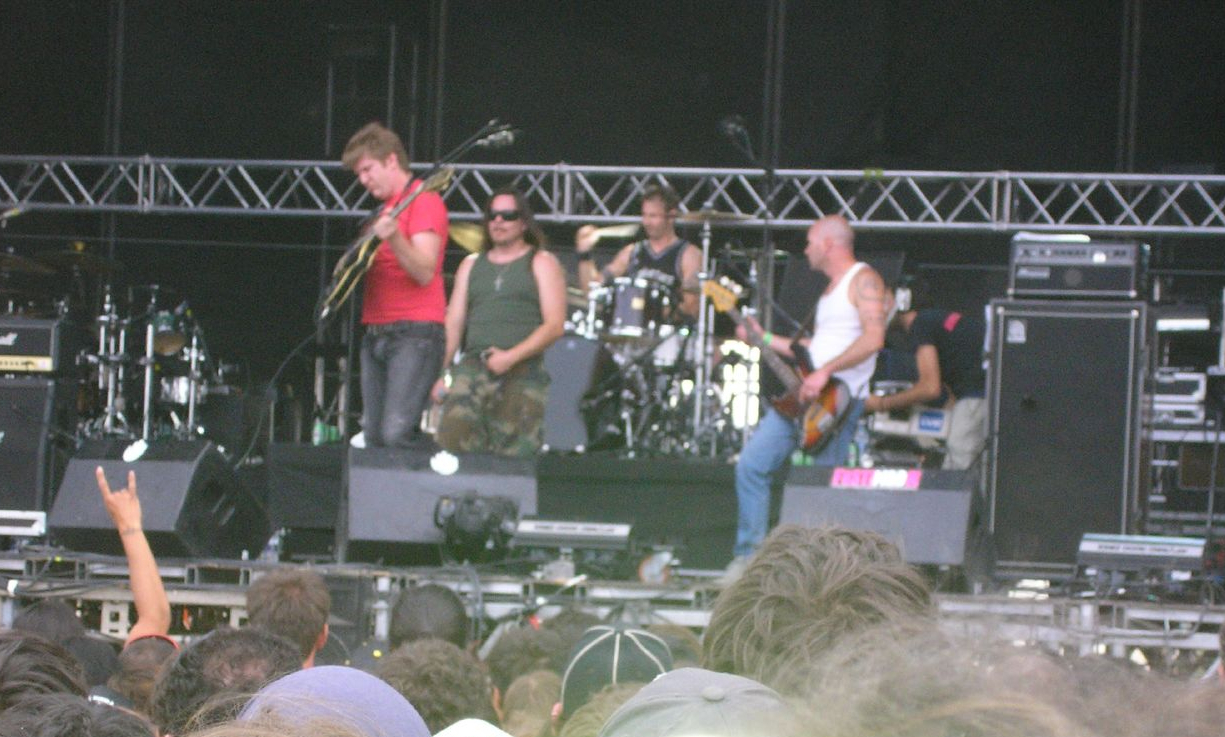
- Hermano in 2005

Background information
- Origin: U.S.
- Genres: Hard rock, stoner rock
- Years active: 1998–present
- Labels: Tee Pee; Suburban; MeteorCity; Ripple Music
- Spinoffs: Orquesta del Desierto
- Spinoff of: Kyuss; Slo Burn; Afghan Whigs
- Members: John Garcia; Dandy Brown; Mike Callahan; David Angstrom; Chris Leathers
- Past members: Steve Earle

Hermano is an American stoner rock band formed in 1998.

== History ==
Formed by producer Dandy Brown as a side project in 1998, the original lineup consisted of vocalist John Garcia (Kyuss, Unida, Slo Burn), bassist Dandy Brown, drummer Steve Earle (Afghan Whigs) and guitarists Mike Callahan (Earshot) and David Angstrom (Supafuzz). After passing tapes and CDs amongst each other for six months, the band members entered the studio in early 1999 to begin recording their debut album. The record was completed in the early 2000; however, it was another two years before it was released, due to an assortment of contractual obligations.

The band released Only a Suggestion on Tee Pee Records in 2002. The release was followed by some brief touring in North America and Europe. During this period, drummer Steve Earle was replaced by Supafuzz drummer Chris Leathers; Leathers joined the band for the first time at the Azkena Festival in Spain in 2003.

Hermano signed to Dutch label Suburban Records and released Dare I Say in 2005.

In 2005, the band released Live at W2, a live CD from their Angry American tour. It was followed by a DVD of the show in 2006.

Hermano released their third album Into the Exam Room in late 2007, and followed the release with tours of Europe.

In 2022, it was announced Hermano had signed to Ripple Music and will release an exclusive 10" album on the label, along with reissues of all previously released albums. The album has been given the name ‘When the Moon was High’ and is scheduled for release on 4 October 2024.

In 2026, the band released a second live album, Clisson, France, from their 2016 Hellfest set.

== Members ==
Current members

- John Garcia – vocals (1998–present)
- Dandy Brown – bass (1998–present)
- Mike Callahan – guitar (1998–present)
- David Angstrom – guitar (1998–present)
- Chris Leathers – drums (2003–present)

Former members

- Steve Earle – drums (1998–2003)
- Earling von Stephenson - vocals, bass (1999-2005)

== Discography ==
Studio albums

- 2002: ...Only a Suggestion (Tee Pee)
- 2004: Dare I Say... (MeteorCity)
- 2007: ...Into the Exam Room (Suburban)
- 2024: When the Moon was High

Live albums

- 2005: Live at W2 (Suburban)
- 2026: Clisson, France (Ripple Music)
