= John Garcia (album) =

Studio album by John Garcia
- Released: July 25, 2014
- Recorded: February 17, 2014 – March 29, 2014
- Studio: Thunder Underground, Palm Springs, California
- Genre: Stoner rock, psychedelic rock
- Length: 44:59
- Label: Napalm
- Producer: John Garcia; Harper Hug; Trevor Whatever

John Garcia chronology
John Garcia (2014)	The Coyote Who Spoke in Tongues (2017)

John Garcia is the debut studio album of American vocalist John Garcia, released on July 25, 2014 via Napalm Records. Music videos were filmed for the songs "My Mind" and "Her Bullets' Energy".

== Track listing ==
All tracks are written by John Garcia, except tracks 2 and 5.

No.	Title	Writer(s)	Length
1.	"My Mind"		4:01
2.	"Rolling Stoned"	Black Mastiff	4:14
3.	"Flower"		4:04
4.	"The Blvd"		4:41
5.	"5000 Miles"	Danko Jones	3:45
6.	"Confusion"		3:38
7.	"His Bullets' Energy"		4:49
8.	"Argleben"		5:19
9.	"Saddleback"		2:44
10.	"All These Walls"		3:05
11.	"Her Bullets' Energy"		4:40

== Notes ==
- "Rolling Stoned" is a cover of the Black Mastiff song. Garcia produced Black Mastiff's second album, Music Machine, which released a year later.
- "5000 Miles" was written by Danko Jones specifically for Garcia after Garcia often conversed with Jones about missing his family while touring.
- "Her Bullets' Energy" is the oldest song on the record, written when Garcia was nineteen years old. Robby Krieger from The Doors performs on the track.
- "All These Walls" is a re-recording of the song "Cactus Jumper" by Garcia's band Slo Burn, which appeared on demo tapes and unofficial releases of the band's EP, Amusing the Amazing. The song features bassist Nick Oliveri.

== Chart positions ==
Chart (2014)	Peak position
Belgian Albums (Ultratop Flanders)	111
German Albums (Offizielle Top 100)	56
Swiss Albums (Schweizer Hitparade)	60
UK Independent Albums (OCC)	47
UK Rock & Metal Albums (OCC)	39
US Heatseekers Albums (Billboard)	39

== Personnel ==
Adapted from the John Garcia liner notes.

Musicians

- David Angstrom – instruments
- Gary Arce – instruments
- Tom Brayton – instruments
- Dandy Brown – instruments
- Monique Caravello – instruments
- Mark Diamond – instruments
- John Garcia – vocals, production
- Damon Garrison – instruments
- Ehren Groben – instruments
- Chris Hale – instruments
- Danko Jones – instruments
- Mikey Kocsandi – instruments
- Jack Kohler – instruments
- Robby Krieger – instruments
- Nick Oliveri – instruments

Production and additional personnel

- Jared Connor – design
- Michael Dumas – engineering (11)
- Vic Florencia – engineering (5)
- Gene Grimaldi – mastering
- Harper Hug – production, engineering, mixing
- Richard Sibbald – photography
- Trevor Whatever – production
- Sam Yong – illustrations, design

== Release history ==
Region	Date	Label	Format	Catalog
United States	2014	Napalm	CD, LP	NPR 550
