= Richard Wilcox =

German diplomat

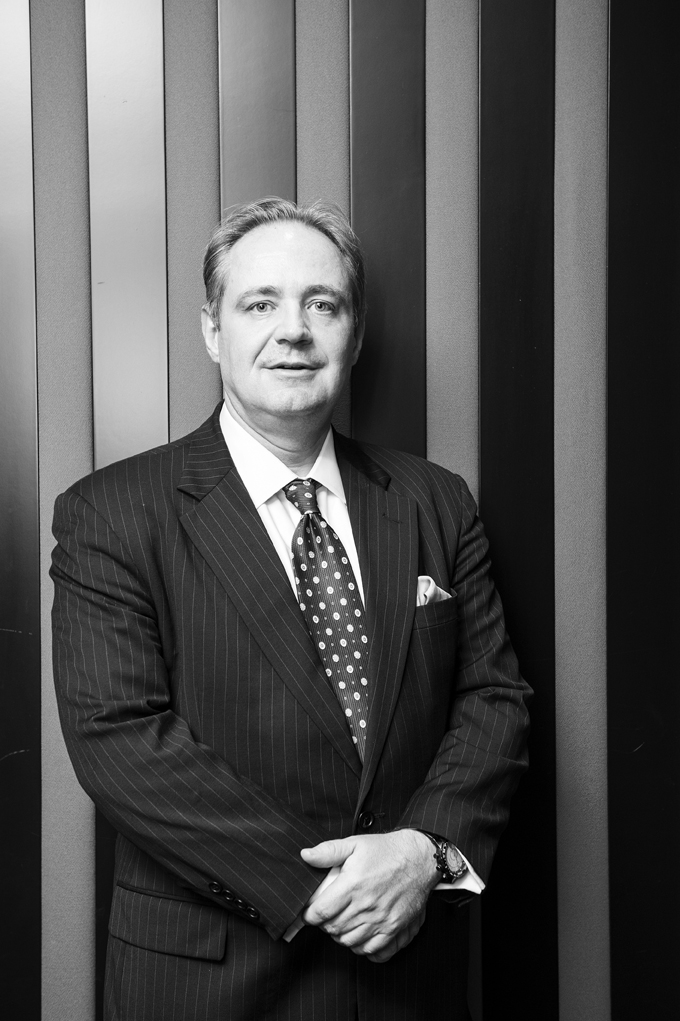
- Born: May 13, 1967 (age 58); Würzburg, West Germany (now Germany)
- Education: The Citadel (BA); Georgetown University (MS); Massachusetts Institute of Technology (PhD)
- Spouse: Milena Wilcox

Richard Wilcox (born 13 May 1967 in Würzburg, Germany) is a German and United States diplomat and public finance expert. He serves as the Director of Private Partnerships for the United Nations World Food Programme.

In December 2024, in his current capacity with WFP, he took part in high-level briefings on global humanitarian crises with the US Administration, including Secretary of State Antony Blinken, as well as the Dutch Government and Minister for Foreign Trade and Development Reinette Klever.

As a WFP Director, Wilcox also supported the Italian government’s ‘Food for Gaza’ initiative and discussed humanitarian efforts with Italian Vice Prime Minister Antonio Tajani, as featured by Italian TV outlets. Preceding this role, he was UN Special Advisor and Director of the UN Task Force on Russian Trade Facilitation as part of the UN’s Black Sea Grain Initiative which he conceived and helped negotiate in 2022.

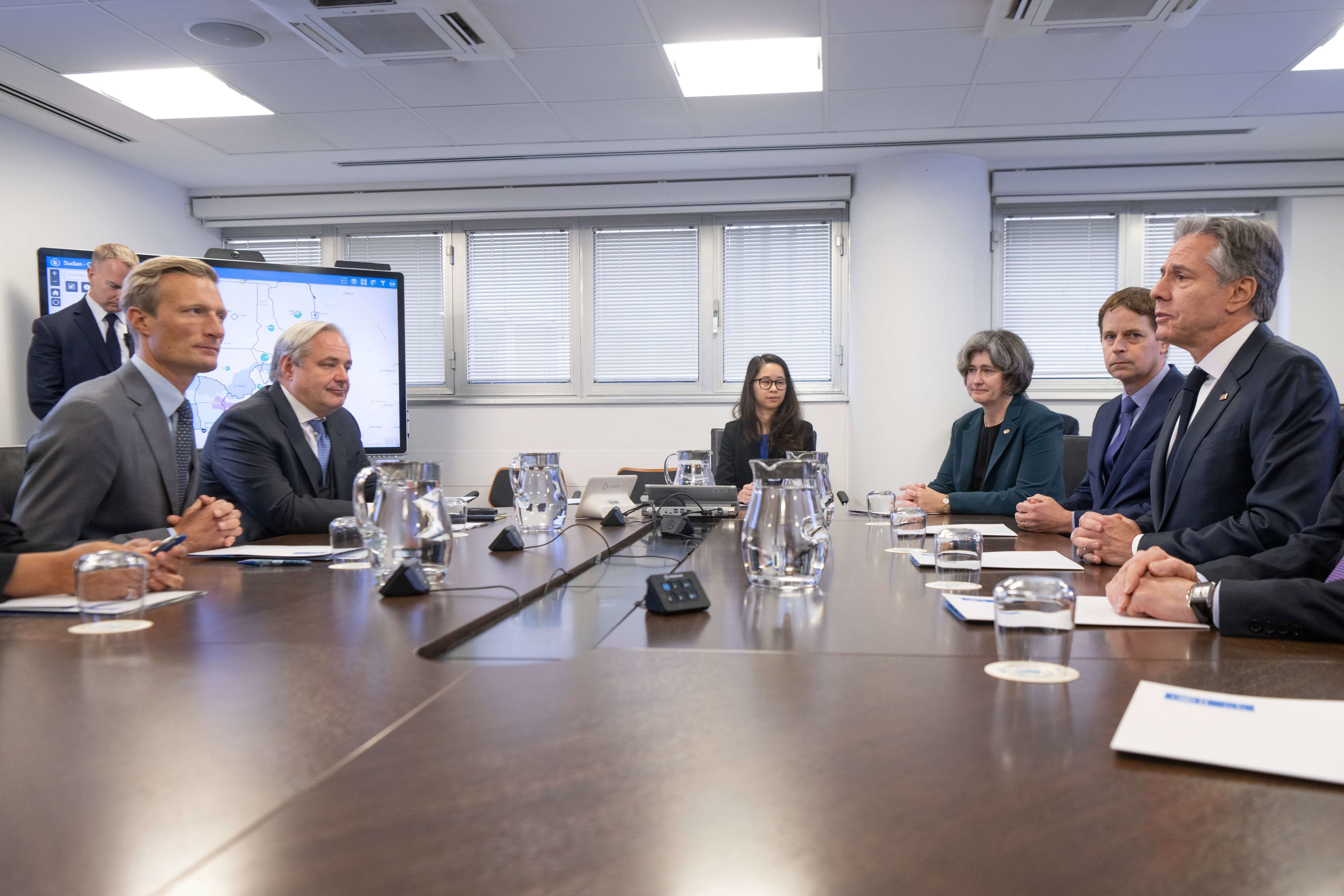
Wilcox at high-level briefings on global humanitarian crises with the US Administration.

Prior to that, he was the Director-General of the African Union’s African Risk Capacity from 2013-2015 at the level of Assistant Secretary General and as Special Advisor on Humanitarian Finance to the United Nations World Food Programme. In 2019, he established the Centre for Humanitarian Dialogue cyber conflict mediation practice in Geneva. In 2017, Richard Wilcox co-founded—and is acting president of—Digital Equity, a Swiss association supporting state and non-state actors with their digital transformation whilst controlling the risks of data misuse and privacy encroachment.

== Biography ==
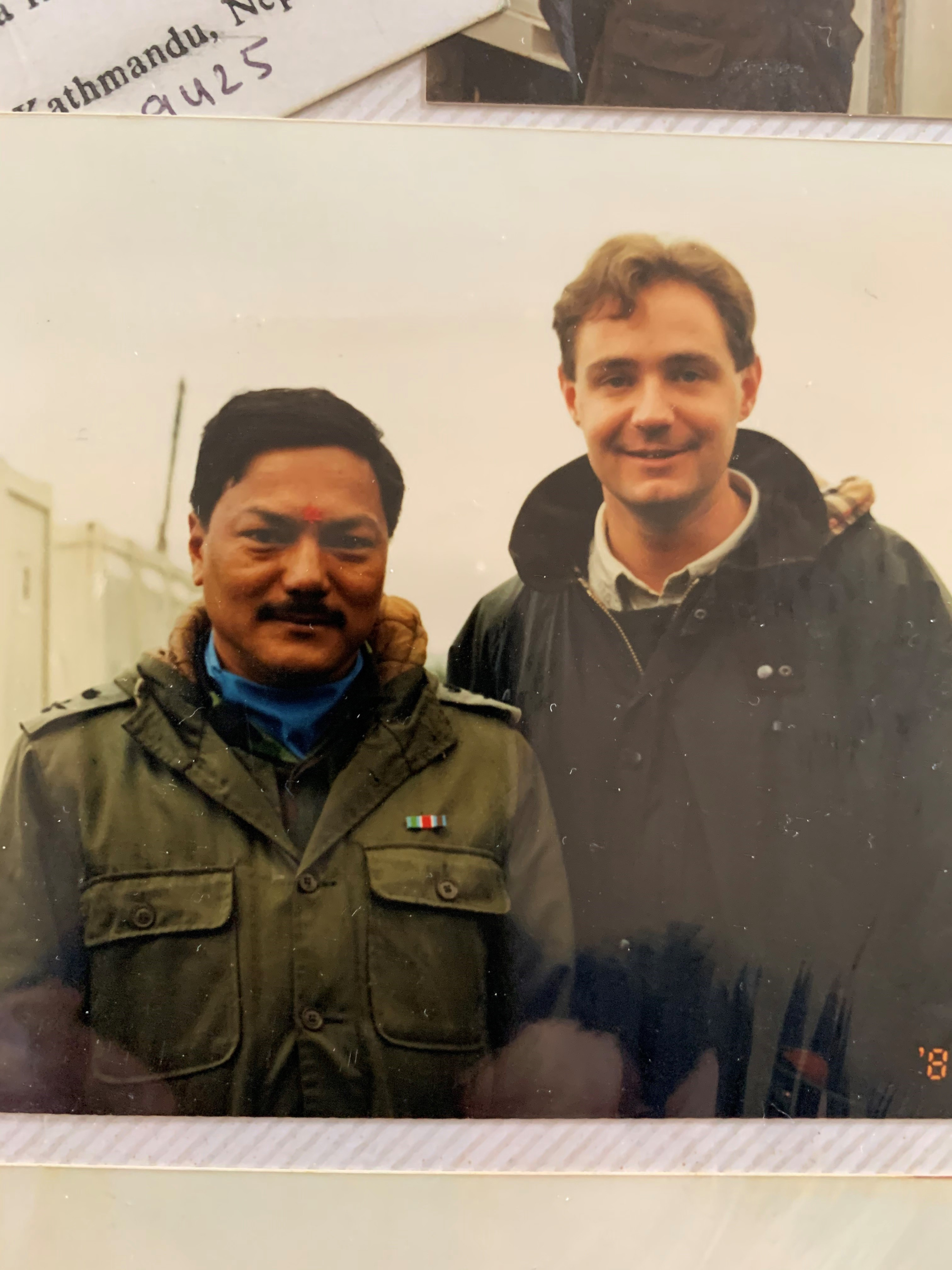
Wilcox with the Commander of the Nepalese Battalion, UNPROFOR, in Croatia, 1995, during his initial assignment with the United Nations.

As a United Nations and African Union diplomat, Wilcox has led key development reform enterprises including the African Risk Capacity (ARC) to ensure African governments against natural disasters and was first to propose a levy on personal data extraction to finance aid for the elimination of extreme poverty. As head of the ARC, he also developed the first sovereign pandemic insurance program.

In 2008, Wilcox served as the UN Secretary-General's envoy to Serbia, from where he supported the UNMIK SRSG in his negotiations of the UNSG 6-points initiative on Kosovo, which then became the first agreement in the UN Security Council on Kosovo in a decade. He had previously served in UN political and peacekeeping missions in the former Yugoslavia (1995-1999) and Iraq (2003-2004, 2007) as well as Director of United Nations affairs on the US National Security Council (1999-2001). In 2017, his nomination as UN special envoy to Libya was withdrawn as Russia retaliated against US opposition to an earlier candidate.

Wilcox holds a Ph.D. from MIT (2000) and was a fellow at Harvard’s Olin Institute for Strategic Studies (1998). He has also taught political science at the Johns Hopkins University’s School of Advanced International Studies.

He lives in Rome, Italy with his wife Milena Wilcox, a wine and olive oil sommelier with Slow Food Roma, and son Teo, winner of the 2016 Keats-Shelley House Poetry Prize. Teo also published Freedom: A Short Story of Eastern Europe on Amazon.

== Publications ==
Joanna Syroka and Richard Wilcox, Rethinking International Disaster Aid Finance, Columbia Journal of International Affairs, Vol. 59, No. 2, The Globalization of Disaster (Spring/Summer 2006), pp. 197–214 https://www.jstor.org/stable/24358433?seq=1#page_scan_tab_contents

Richard Wilcox, Data Financing for the Global Good – Afterword, pp. 55–56 https://www.oii.ox.ac.uk/wp-content/uploads/2016/10/Oll-Rockefeller-Data-Financing-for-Global-Good.pdf
