= Juan Manuel García (water polo) =

Mexican water polo player (born 1951)

Personal information
- Born: 24 February 1951 (age 75) Mexico City, Mexico

Sport
- Sport: Water polo

Juan Manuel García (born 24 February 1951) is a Mexican water polo player. He competed at the 1968 Summer Olympics, the 1972 Summer Olympics and the 1976 Summer Olympics.
