= Ripple Music =

American record label

Ripple Music is a California-based independent record label founded in 2010 by Todd Severin and John Rancik. The company encompasses a record label, a music publishing business, a marketing, promotion and sales team, and distribution for independent heavy metal bands (Heavy Ripples Distro). It has become well known in the subculture of underground doom metal and adjacent genres.

== History ==
Ripple Music, the record label, evolved out of the music site The Ripple Effect, which Severin and Rancik launched in October 2007. With a tagline of "The Best Music You're Not Listening To," the Ripple Effect concentrated on in-depth music reviews of new, lost classic, and unheralded artists. Early in their existence, Severin, a former radio DJ, and Rancik (former lead singer of a punk/metal band, concentrated on reviews from their own extensive record collections and then expanded to include new reviews, interviews, streaming songs, video uploads, downloads, and previews/sneak peeks. The Ripple Effect was ranked as one of the top music sites in the world by GuitarWorld Magazine and several other music sites.

As the Ripple Effect's popularity grew, a radio show was added which was originally produced by Chris James Ripple Radio, on blogtalkradio.com. Shortly, Ripple Radio was recognized as one of the featured radio shows at blogtalkradio.com, and guests such as Marky Ramone, Fee Waybill, and Cy Curnin stopped by to chat with Severin (Racer) and Rancik (Pope JTE).

Severin and Rancik were approached by protometal band JPT Scare Band, with the proposition of releasing several previously unheard JPT tracks. This facilitated the start of Ripple Music, the record label. Shortly thereafter, several bands signed with Ripple Music, including two 1970's protometal icons, Poobah and Iron Claw.

Since 2017, the label has hosted several RippleFest events in the United States and Europe as well as RippleFest Virtual in December 2020.

In 2019, the label expanded its presence on the East Coast when co-founder John Rancik moved to Baltimore, Maryland.

In 2020, the label began a 12-inch vinyl series called "Blood and Strings: The Ripple Acoustic." The first release in this series was The Obsessed founder Scott Weinrich's solo album Forever Gone.

As of early 2021, the label lists over 300 releases on Discogs and 189 titles appear on All Music.

In January 2021, Ripple Music was joined by Ozzy Osbourne bassist Rob "Blasko" Nicholson as its new Executive Vice President of A&R and Special Projects.

== Artists ==
- Band of Spice
- JPT Scare Band
- Poobah
- Scott "Wino" Weinrich
- Fatso Jetson
- Yawning Man
- Hermano
- Roadsaw

== See also ==
List of record labels
