= Juan García Larrondo =

Spanish playwright (born 1965)

Juan García Larrondo (born 1965) is a Spanish playwright born in El Puerto de Santa María, Cádiz Province.
