= Juan Camilo García =

Colombian footballer (born 1988)

Personal information
- Full name: Juan Camilo García Morales
- Date of birth: June 15, 1988 (age 38)
- Place of birth: Medellín, Colombia
- Height: 1.69 m (5 ft 7 in)
- Position: Midfielder

Senior career*
Years	Team	Apps	(Gls)
2010–2013	Atlético Nacional	2	(0)
2011–2012	→ Alianza Petrolera (loan)	41	(3)
2013	→ Jaguares (loan)	13	(0)
2013	→ Zulia FC (loan)	4	(0)
- * Club domestic league appearances and goals as of July 8, 2013

Juan Camilo García Morales (born 15 June 1988) is a Colombian football midfielder.

== Titles ==
Season	Club	Title
2012	Alianza Petrolera	Categoría Primera B
