= Juan Manuel García (Mexican footballer) =

Mexican footballer and manager (born 1980)

Personal information
- Full name: Juan Manuel García Zavala
- Date of birth: 18 February 1980 (age 46)
- Place of birth: Guadalajara, Jalisco, Mexico
- Height: 1.79 m (5 ft 10 in)
- Position: Defender

Team information
- Current team: Santos Laguna U-19 (Manager)

Senior career*
Years	Team	Apps	(Gls)
1999–2006	Atlas	76	(1)
2006–2009	León	54	(2)
2008–2009	→ Correcaminos UAT (loan)	25	(1)
2010–2013	UdeG	59	(3)
2010	→ Veracruz (loan)	6	(1)

Managerial career
- 2013–2014: Leones Negros UdeG Premier (Assistant)
- 2015–2017: Chiapas Reserves and Academy
- 2017–2018: Atlas Reserves and Academy
- 2019: Celaya (Assistant)
- 2020–2022: Tampico Madero (Assistant)
- 2022–2023: Santos Laguna (women) (Assistant)
- 2023–: Santos Laguna Reserves and Academy
- * Club domestic league appearances and goals

Juan Manuel García Zavala (born 18 February 1980) is a Mexican football manager and former player.
