= Batmobile (band) =

Dutch psychobilly band

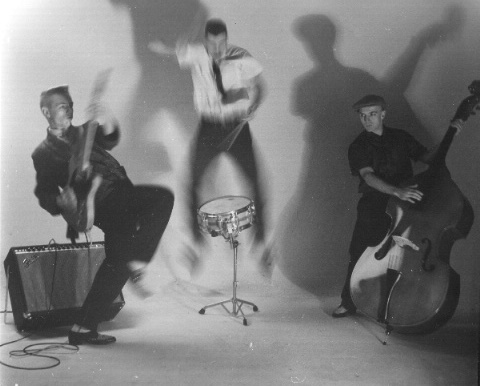

Background information
- Origin: Netherlands
- Genres: Psychobilly, rockabilly
- Years active: 1983–present
- Label: Count Orlok/Butler/Music on Vinyl
- Members: Jeroen Haamers; Eric Haamers; Johnny Zuidhof
- Website: batmobileforever.com

Batmobile is a Dutch psychobilly band from Rotterdam and Breda, formed in 1983. They were the first band not from the United Kingdom to perform at the influential psychobilly club, Klub Foot and are considered the seminal Dutch psychobilly band.

== History ==
=== Early history ===
Batmobile was formed as a hobby in 1983. The band continues today with the founding lineup of Jeroen Haamers on vocals and guitar, Eric Haamers on bass, and Johnny Zuidhof on drums. The band played only covers of early rockabilly and rock and roll by Elvis Presley, Gene Vincent, Chuck Berry, and Johnny Burnette. The band is named after the Batmobile, the car driven by Batman. The name was suggested by Zuidhof who presented the idea for the name during band practice. The band began playing various gigs at bars and one time, while playing a bar in a rural area, the band received a bad response from farmers who were at the bar. The band began playing covers extra fast, in a punk rock style to get everyone's attention. Bar staff and some patrons enjoyed the music and the band started playing psychobilly shows. Their debut self-titled EP was released in 1985 on Rockhouse/Kix4U.

=== Breakthrough at Klub Foot ===
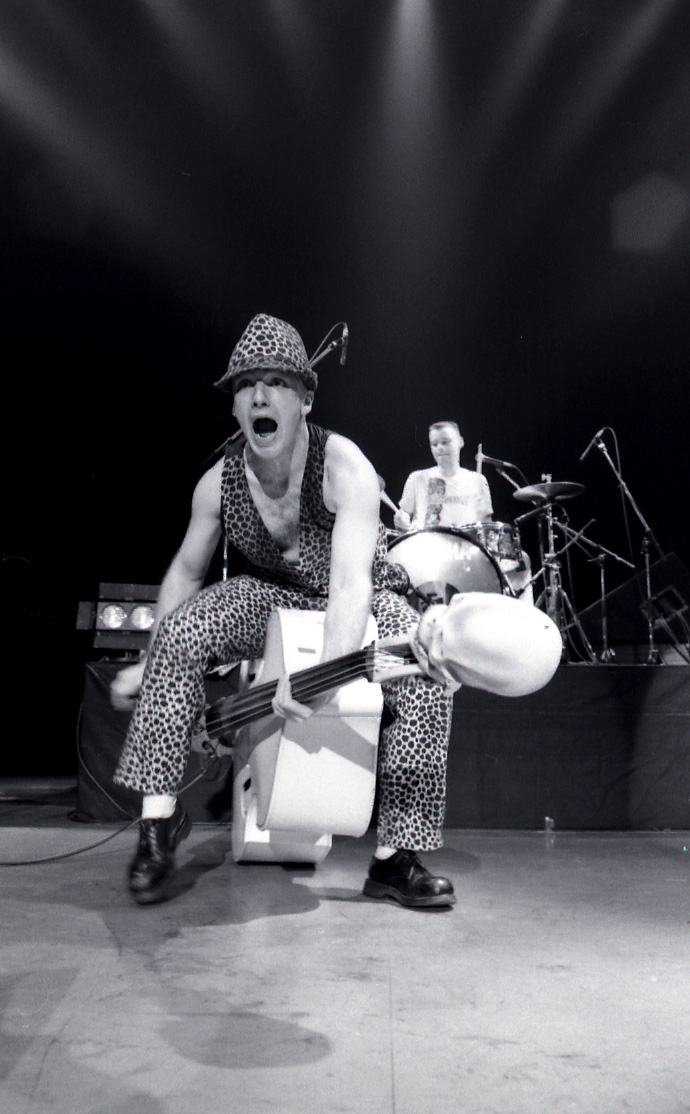
Batmobile in Japan

The band's first major gig outside of the Netherlands was at Klub Foot in London in 1986. They were the first band not from the United Kingdom to play at the club. They played with Demented Are Go and Torment. That same year, Zuidhof and the band's sound engineer, Eddie, created Count Orlok records after a lawsuit with their then current label, Rockhouse/Kix4U. That label failed to pay the band royalties and Batmobile ended up suing the label. They won in court and their contract ended, hence the founding of Court Orlok. Count Orlok released the band's first full-length album, Bambooland in 1987. The band toured Switzerland, West Germany, England and Austria.

In 1988, Batmobile released Buried Alive!, a collection of concert and demo recordings. That same year, they released Bail Was Set at $6,000,000 on Nervous Records. The album featured a cover of "Ace of Spades" by Motörhead. They returned to their own label, Count Orlok, to release Amazons from Outer Space in 1989. In 1990, they released an EP, Batmobile is Dynamite!, and the following year, their sixth full-length album, Sex Starved. The band went on hiatus in 1993 and re-emerged in 1995 for a tour of Japan. They released a live album from the tour in 1996. The following year, they released Welcome to Planet Cheese, in which the band abandoned their signature psychobilly style to perform songs in a style influenced by B movies. This is the only album where Eric Haamers does not play an upright bass.

=== 2000s and today ===
In 2000, the band went on a hiatus for personal reasons. Their last concert, before their hiatus, was in New York City. A tribute album for the band was produced in Japan. The tribute featured 33 international bands and a song contributed by Batmobile, titled "Baby Go Back Home." They performed live again in 2003 after an invitation to play the Satanic Stomp festival in Speyer, Germany. They performed at the Knitting Factory in Los Angeles, California, in 2005. In 2007, a second tribute to Batmobile was released in Japan. In 2008, Batmobile did a split album with Peter Pan Speedrock, in which Speedrock covered Batmobile songs and Batmobile covered Speedrock songs. The idea of the album was spawned at a party by the band and Speedrock. The band no longer does major tours, but, continues to perform at least once a few times a month and at special events. On October 2, 2020 "Big Bat" was released. In 2023 the band celebrated its 40th anniversary with a new album called Brace for Impact and a club tour.

== Side projects and collaborations ==
During the band's hiatus in the early 2000s, bassist Eric Haamers continued to perform. He played in The Gecko Brothers, The Cactus Cowboys and Tio Gringo. In 2004, Jeroen Haamers started an Elvis Presley cover band called Triple Dynamite and in 2020 he, his brother Eric and Mark Eeftens started an Alt Country band called JJ's Country. Jeroen also plays in Speedmobile, a loud rock 'n roll band together with the Barts from PPSR

== Music style and influences ==
"We didn't get into psychobilly, but that got into us." – Jeroen Haamers, Batmobile lead singer and guitar

The band originally started out playing covers of early American rockabilly and rock and roll, and were initially disinterested in playing psychobilly, because of the bands that were performing this style in the Netherlands in the 1980s, which Batmobile deemed to be "boring and corny". Later, the band took their love for early American rockabilly and blended with punk after experimenting at a concert.

Singer and guitarist Jeroen Haamers is the lead songwriter. It takes him between "two minutes..to two days," to write a song, and that "Inspiration comes at the weirdest times..in bed, on the toilet, or in the shower." The band attempts to bring a new sound to each album they record. They often produce their own albums, with each band member producing a certain number of songs on each record.

== Members ==
- Jeroen Haamers – lead vocals, guitar
- Eric Haamers – double bass
- Johnny Zuidhof – drums, vocals

== Discography ==
=== Studio albums and releases ===
- Batmobile (mini album, Kix4U/Rockhouse 1985)
- Bambooland (album, Count Orlok, 1987)
- Buried Alive (double vinyl, Count Orlok, 1988)
- Bail Was Set at $6,000,000 (album, Nervous Records, 1988)
- Amazons From Outer Space (album, Count Orlok, 1989)
- Is Dynamite (mini album, Count Orlok, 1990)
- Sex Starved (album, Count Orlok, 1991)
- Hard Hammer Hits (album, Count Orlok, 1992)
- Midnight Maniac (Single, Count Orlok 1992)
- Blast From The Past (album, Count Orlok, 1993)
- Shoot Shoot (Single, Count Orlok 1993)
- Bambooland Vinyl EP, 2 songs (Count Orlok, 1995)
- Welcome to the Planet Cheese (album, Count Orlok, 1997)
- Cross Contamination Split album with Peter Pan Speedrock (Suburban/People Like You, 2008)
- Wow! Vinyl EP, 4 songs (Hands & Arms, 2011)
- First Demo Tapes Vinyl EP, 5 songs (Migrane Records, 2015)
- Hurt Vinyl EP, 2 songs (Earthquake Files, 2016)
- Brand New Blisters (album, Butler, 2017)
- Rock & Roll and Alcohol Vinyl EP, 2 songs (Butler, 2017)
- Teenage Lobotomy Vinyl EP, 2 songs (Music on Vinyl, 2018)
- The 1987 Demos Vinyl EP, 2 songs (Music on Vinyl, 2019)
- Big Bat a Go Go Vinyl EP, 2 songs (Music on Vinyl, 2020)
- Big Bat (mini album, 2020)
- The Boys are Back in Town/King Rocker Vinyl EP, 2 songs (King Rockers, 2022)
- Brace for Impact (album, Music on Vinyl/Butler, 2023)

=== Live albums ===
- Batmobile live at the KlubFoot 1986 (Anagram/Cherry Red, 2008)

=== Compilations ===
- Psycho attack over Europe 1 & 2 (Rockhouse 1986/1987)
- Stomping at the Klubfoot 3&4 (Link 1987)
- DVD Stomping at the Klubfoot (Anagram/Cherry Red)
- A Fistful of pussies (1988)
- Rock 'n Horreur (1989)
- AMP-Magazine vol 5 Psychobilly (2006)
- Go Cat Go; A Psychobilly Tribute to The Stray Cats (2006)
- God Save the King; A Psychobilly Tribute to Elvis (2007)

== See also ==
- List of psychobilly bands
