= JPT Scare Band =

American rock band

- Origin: Kansas City, Missouri, U.S.
- Genres: Hard rock; heavy metal; psychedelic rock; acid rock; blues rock
- Years active: 1973–present
- Labels: Ripple Music
- Members: Terry Swope; Paul Grigsby; Jeff Littrell
- Website: jptscareband.com

JPT Scare Band is an American rock band. It took its name from its members first initials and their "scary" acid rock and early heavy metal sound. Although the band did not release their first album until the early 1990s, they had formed in the early 1970s and made numerous recordings on a reel to reel tape deck in a basement.

Songs from the album, Sleeping Sickness, went into fairly heavy rotation on FM stations WFMU and WNYU in New York, which played a role in lifting JPT up from obscurity. The band was featured in an article in the March 2007 issue of Classic Rock titled, "The Lost Pioneers of Heavy Metal".

In 2010, Rhapsody (online music service) called their album Past is Prologue one of the best "proto-metal" albums of all time.

The three original members of the band are still active, having released two albums on their own Kung Bomar Records label. A third album was released on the Kung Bomar label, Halloween of 2009, called Rumdum Daddy.

The band signed a contract with independent label, Ripple Music in January 2010. The first album released on the label was Acid Blues Is The White Man's Burden in June 2010.

== Discography ==
- Acid Acetate Excursion Vinyl LP (1994)
- Rape Of Titan's Sirens Vinyl LP (1998)
- Sleeping Sickness CD (2000 Reissue 2009)
- Past is Prologue CD (2001)
- Jamm Vapour CD (2007)
- Rumdum Daddy CD (2009)
- Acid Blues Is The White Man's Burden (2010)
