= Juan Ramón (footballer, born 1987) =

Spanish footballer

Personal information
- Full name: Juan Ramón Luis García
- Date of birth: 19 May 1987 (age 39)
- Place of birth: La Orotava, Spain
- Height: 1.85 m (6 ft 1 in)
- Position: Midfielder

Team information
- Current team: Tenerife Ibarra

Youth career
- Tenerife

Senior career*
Years	Team	Apps	(Gls)
2005–2011	Tenerife B	105	(2)
2006–2011	Tenerife	15	(0)
2007	→ Orientación Marítima (loan)	16	(0)
2007–2008	→ Universidad LP (loan)	17	(0)
2011–2012	Zamora	35	(0)
2012–2014	Atlético Granadilla	65	(1)
2014–	Tenerife Ibarra	29	(2)
- * Club domestic league appearances and goals as of 1 November 2015

Juan Ramón Luis García (born 19 May 1987 in La Orotava, Tenerife), known as Juan Ramón or Juanra, is a Spanish professional footballer who plays for UD Tenerife Sur Ibarra as a right midfielder.
