= Suburban Records =

Dutch record label

- Founded: 1999
- Founder: Ronald Draijer
- Genre: Rock, indie rock, heavy metal, stoner metal
- Country of origin: Netherlands
- Location: Haarlem, Netherlands
- Official website: Website

Suburban Records is a record label based in the Netherlands. In 1999 Suburban Records, the inhouse label of Suburban Marketing & Distribution was created giving a home to bands like Peter Pan Speedrock, El Guapo Stuntteam, Hermano, Astrosoniq, Mina Caputo and the latest signings Shaking Godspeed, Paceshifters and Gingerpig.

Suburban's philosophy is to form and maintain a healthy music industry within the Benelux. Suburban is convinced that there has to be a strong platform for non-mainstream musical products in general, and for the popular (heavy) rock in particular.

== Artists ==
Artists as of 2011:

- Peter Pan Speedrock
- Gingerpig
- Shaking Godspeed
- Black Bottle Riot
- Paceshifters
- The Ettes
- El Guapo Stuntteam
- Asylum On The Hill
- Kingfisher Sky
- The View
- Mina Caputo
- Exile Parade
- Hermano
- Repomen
- Hydromatics
- Cooper
- Incense
- Miss Moses
- Pale
- Birth of Joy

== Discography ==
Peter Pan Speedrock

- Peter Pan (1997)
- Rocketfuel (1998)
- Killermachine (2000)
- Premium Quality... Serve Loud! (2001)
- Lucky Bastards (2003)
- Spread Eagle (2005)
- Pursuit Until Capture (2007)
- We Want Blood (2010)

Gingerpig

- The Ways Of The Gingerpig (2011)

Shaking Godspeed

- AWE (2010)

Paceshifters

- One for the Road (2010)

The Ettes

- Look At Life Again Soon (2008)

El Guapo Stuntteam

- Soul Style (demo) (1997)
- El Guapo Stuntteam (1999)
- Year Of The Panther (2001)
- Battles Across The Stereo Spectrum (2004)
- Accusation Blues (2007)
- El Guapo Stuntteam (2009)

Asylum On The Hill

- Passage To The Puzzle Factory (2010)

Kingfisher Sky

- Hallway of Dreams (2007)
- Skin of the Earth (2010)

The View

- Which Bitch? (2009)

Mina Caputo

- A Fondness For Hometown Scars (2008)

Exile Parade

- Fire Walk With Me (2008)

Hermano

- Live at W2 (2005)
- ...Into The Exam Room (2007)

Repomen

- Roadkill (2008)

Hydromatics

- The Earth Is Shaking (2007)

Cooper

- Activate (2001)

Incense

- Approx 45 Min (2001)
- On Tip Of Wings We Walk (2003)

Miss Moses

- Limbs Divine (2007)

Pale

- Pale (2001)

Birth of Joy

- Life in Babalou (2012)

== See also ==
- List of record labels
- Independent record label
