= Slo Burn =

American rock band

- Origin: Palm Desert, California, U.S.
- Genres: Stoner metal; desert rock
- Years active: 1996–1998; 2017
- Label: Malicious Vinyl
- Spinoffs: Brave Black Sea; Unida; Hermano
- Spinoff of: Kyuss
- Members: John Garcia; Chris Hale; Damon Garrison; Brady Houghton

Slo Burn is an American stoner metal band that was primarily active in 1996 and 1997. The band was formed by John Garcia of the influential stoner rock band Kyuss, which had split up some months previously. Garcia was joined by Chris Hale on guitar, Damon Garrison on bass, and Brady Houghton on drums.

== History ==
In 1996, the band distributed a five-song demo, and in April 1997 released an EP entitled Amusing the Amazing through the record label Malicious Vinyl. According to interviews, Garcia claimed that the band also intended to record a full-length album. Slo Burn played Ozzfest in 1997, before splitting in 1998. Garcia subsequently joined the equally short-lived band Unida, before becoming the vocalist with Hermano, which have since recorded three studio albums.

In 2017, Slo Burn reunited and played shows at several European festivals including Desertfest London and Freak Valley. They made a single appearance in the U.S. at Psycho Las Vegas 2017.

== Musical style ==
Slo Burn has a sound very similar to that of latter-day Kyuss, which can be attributed to Garcia's singing style and the production work of Chris Goss. However, the music is more direct and less layered and complex. AllMusic describes their style as "simple structures formed out of monolithic rhythm guitars" with "guitar solos that come and go and vibrate weirdly on the way".

== Members ==
- John Garcia – vocals
- Chris Hale – guitar
- Damon Garrison – bass
- Brady Houghton – drums

== Discography ==
- Slo Burn Demo (1996)
- Amusing the Amazing (1997, Malicious Vinyl)
