= John Garcia (singer) =

American singer

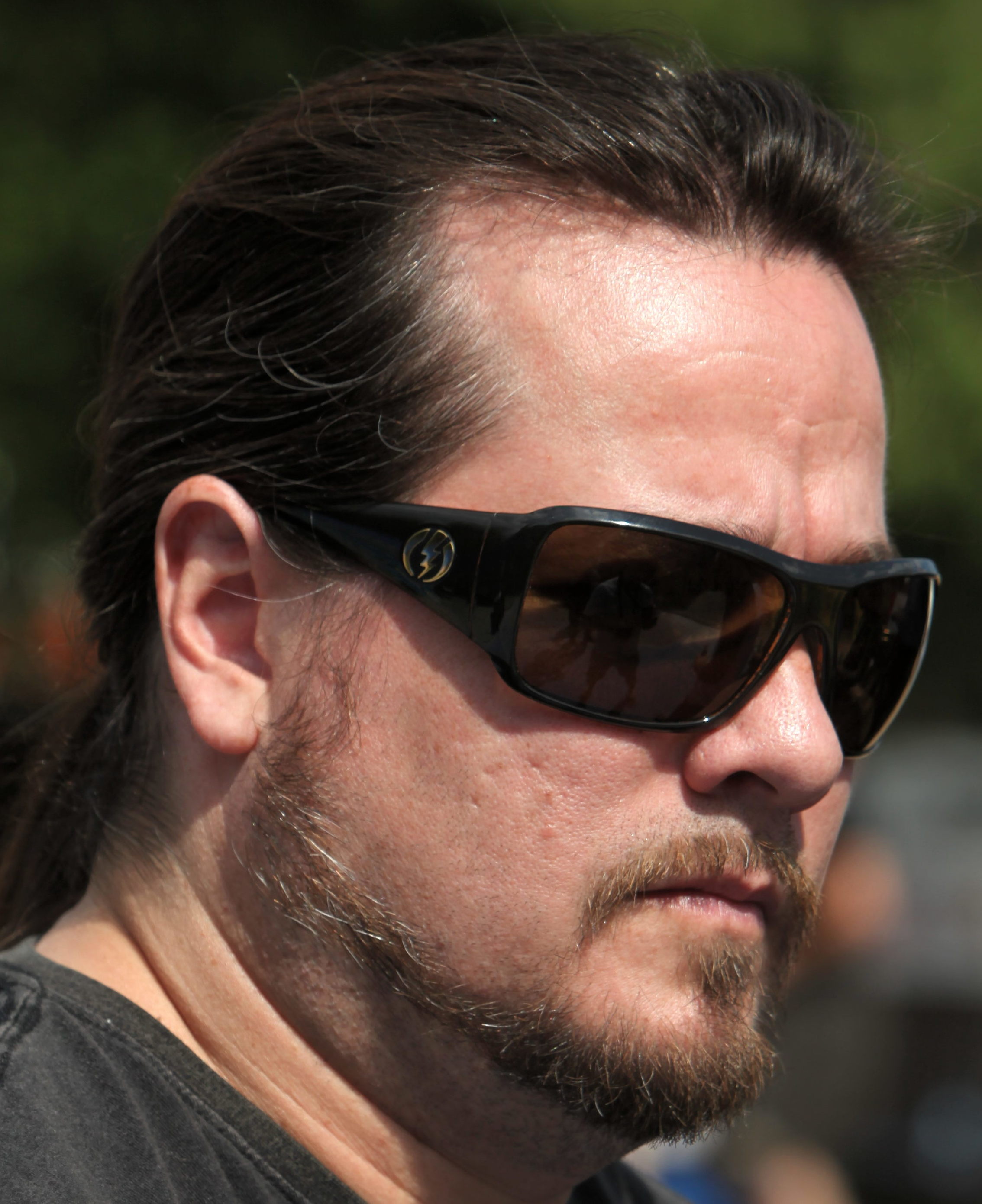
- Garcia in 2011

Background information
- Born: September 4, 1970 (age 56); San Manuel, Arizona, U.S.
- Origin: Palm Springs, California, U.S.
- Genres: Stoner rock; desert rock; heavy metal
- Occupations: Singer; songwriter
- Years active: 1987–present
- Label: Napalm
- Member of: John Garcia and the Band of Gold; Hermano; Slo Burn
- Formerly of: Kyuss; Vista Chino; Unida

John Garcia (born September 4, 1970) is an American singer and songwriter. He is best known as the vocalist and founding member of stoner rock bands Kyuss, Slo Burn, Unida and Hermano. Garcia also performed in Vista Chino, formerly Kyuss Lives!, with former Kyuss members Brant Bjork and Nick Oliveri. Garcia has since decided to pursue his solo career, having formed his band, John Garcia and the Band of Gold, in 2019.

== Musical career ==
=== Kyuss ===
In 1989, while still in high school, Garcia formed Kyuss (originally known as Katzenjammer and Sons of Kyuss) with Brant Bjork, Chris Cockrell, Josh Homme and Nick Oliveri. Through changing lineups, the band produced five albums in total, all of which featured Garcia on vocals. In October 1995, just three months after releasing the album ...And the Circus Leaves Town, Kyuss disbanded. Their final official release was a 10" vinyl on the now defunct label Man's Ruin Records, which was later re-released on a split CD with Homme's post-Kyuss project Queens of the Stone Age. Kyuss had been on an indefinite hiatus ever since. In November 2010, along with former members Oliveri and Bjork, it was announced he would be touring as Kyuss Lives!, and toured Europe, Australia and New Zealand from March to May 2011 with a new studio album expected to follow. Bruno Fevery filled in for Homme, who did not want to participate. In November 2012, following a lawsuit filed by Homme and former Kyuss bassist Scott Reeder, Kyuss Lives! changed their name to Vista Chino.

=== Slo Burn ===
In 1996, Garcia formed stoner rock band Slo Burn in Palm Desert, California. Releasing just one EP, Amusing the Amazing, the band's tenure was short-lived, though it was embraced by the former Kyuss fanbase. A total of 9 songs were recorded, but the band did not have enough funds, so the 4 tracks were released as an EP. Bootleg copies of the album that have the remaining 5 tracks exist, unmixed, in varying quality. The band played at Ozzfest in 1997 before disbanding later that year, for reasons never officially revealed. Slo Burn reunited twenty years later in 2017 and went on tour before going on hiatus the same year.

=== Unida ===
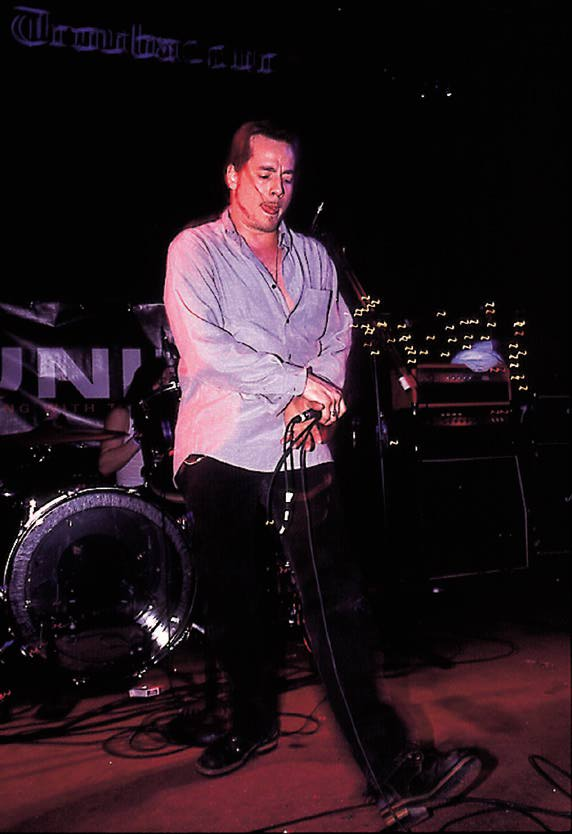
Garcia performing with Unida in 2000

Upon leaving Slo Burn, Garcia formed the band Unida, which at one point included former Kyuss bassist Scott Reeder. Unida released one album, Coping with the Urban Coyote and a split EP with the Swedish group Dozer. Unida were signed to Rick Rubin's label, American Recordings, and recorded a second album, El Coyote (alternatively known as The Great Divide) which was unreleased due to company partner, Island/Def Jam, not seeing any commercial potential in the music. The band, however, distributed the album themselves, selling copies at their live shows while on tour. Unida is currently touring without Garcia due to touring with his solo band.

=== Hermano ===
In 1998, Garcia joined Hermano, a side-project created by producer Dandy Brown. Since 2002, the band has released three studio albums: Only a Suggestion, Dare I Say, and Into the Exam Room, and one live album, Live at W2. Hermano currently remains on hiatus due to Garcia's commitment to his solo band.

=== Vista Chino ===
In early 2010, a European tour was announced, starting with a gig at Roadburn Festival in April. Billed as "Garcia Plays Kyuss", the performances consisted entirely of songs originally recorded by Garcia's former band, Kyuss. His backing-band is composed of Belgian and Dutch musicians from Agua de Annique, Kong, Celestial Season and Arsenal. During their performance at Hellfest on June 20, John Garcia was joined on stage by former Kyuss members Brant Bjork and Nick Oliveri while playing "Gardenia" and "Green Machine".

In November 2010, John Garcia formed Kyuss Lives! with Brant Bjork, Nick Oliveri, and Bruno Fevery. Due to legal pressure in November 2012, Kyuss Lives! announced that they had changed their name to Vista Chino.

Vista Chino released their debut album Peace on September 3, 2013, through Napalm Records.

=== Various projects and collaborations ===
In the mid-1990s, Garcia was chosen to be the lead vocalist for Karma to Burn's debut album, however the band ultimately settled on a different singer. One of the songs recorded during their studio sessions together, "Two Times", appeared on the band's 2010 album Appalachian Incantation as a bonus track.

In 1999, Garcia collaborated with Swedish all-female stoner band Misdemeanor on "Love Song", the fourth track of their EP, Five Wheel Drive.

In 2001, he contributed vocals to the track The Thing That Should Not Be along with drummer Jason Bonham, bassist Jeff Pilson (Dokken,) and guitarist Kurdt Vanderhoof for the Metallica tribute album Metallic Assault.

In 2002, Garcia contributed vocals to two tracks on UK band Orange Goblin's album Coup de Grace, "Made of Rats" and "Jesus Beater".

In late 2003, Garcia recorded vocals for the song "Born Too Slow" by The Crystal Method. The song became the lead single of Legion of Boom. The song did moderately well in terms of radio airplay and is highly popular among fans of The Crystal Method, particularly because of the howling vocals Garcia laid down on the track. Limp Bizkit guitarist Wes Borland played guitar on the song. Garcia has performed the song live several times with The Crystal Method.

On December 20, 2005, Garcia would finally team up with Homme again, making a guest appearance onstage with Queens of the Stone Age during the encore of their set at the Wiltern Theatre in Los Angeles. They performed three Kyuss songs together: "Thumb", "Hurricane" and "Supa Scoopa and Mighty Scoop". This appearance fueled Kyuss reunion rumours, though Homme has stated publicly that a proper Kyuss reunion is unlikely to ever happen.

In 2006, Garcia collaborated with Canadian band Danko Jones on their third album, Sleep Is the Enemy, contributing vocals to the track "Invisible". He would again collaborate with Danko Jones on their 2008 album Never Too Loud, appearing on the track "Forest for the Trees" along with Pete Stahl.

Garcia has worked on a solo project under the moniker "Garcia Vs Garcia", which was originally slated for a September 2008 release but has since been delayed indefinitely.

In 2008, John Garcia collaborated with Belgian band Arsenal on their album Lotuk, contributing lyrics and vocals to two tracks, "Not a Man" and "Diggin' a Hole". The band members of Arsenal also shot a film documenting the making of the album, including footage of Garcia driving around in his hometown.

In 2012, Garcia appeared on the Mondo Generator album, Hell Comes to Your Heart, providing backing vocals on two of its tracks, "Won't Let Go" and "The Last Train".

On July 25, 2014, he released his debut solo album, John Garcia.

In 2017, Garcia released his second solo album, The Coyote Who Spoke in Tongues.

In early 2019, he released his third solo album under the name John Garcia and the Band of Gold. Garcia has since toured under the moniker alongside the lineup of guitarist Ehren Groban, bassist Mike Pygmie, and drummer Greg Saenz.

In 2024, Garcia embarked on the “Tour of the Valedores” through North America with a backing band including Saenz, bassist Billy Cordell, and former Icarus Line guitarist John Bennett. In 2025, he toured the west coast and Canada with the same lineup as part of the “Bastardos Ratas” tour.

== Discography ==
Solo

- John Garcia (2014)
- John Garcia / Black Mastiff (2015) "Little Marshall"
- The Coyote Who Spoke in Tongues (2017)
- John Garcia and the Band of Gold (2019)

Kyuss

- Sons of Kyuss (1990)
- Wretch (1991)
- Blues for the Red Sun (1992)
- Welcome to Sky Valley (1994)
- ...And the Circus Leaves Town (1995)

Slo Burn

- Amusing the Amazing (1996)

Unida

- Coping with the Urban Coyote (1999)
- El Coyote/The Great Divide (unreleased 2001)

Hermano

- ...Only a Suggestion (2002)
- Dare I Say... (2004)
- Live at W2 (2005)
- ...Into the Exam Room (2007)
- When the Moon was High (2024)

Vista Chino

- Peace (2013)

Guest appearances

- Supafuzz – Supafuzz (1998) "You Don't Even Know Me", "Mr. Policeman"
- Misdemeanor – Five Wheel Drive EP (1999) "Love Song"
- Mondo Generator – Cocaine Rodeo (2000) "Simple Exploding Man"
- Metallic Assault: A Tribute to Metallica (2001) "The Thing That Should Not Be"
- Orange Goblin – Coup de Grace (2002) "Made of Rats", "Jesus Beater"
- Gallery of Mites – Bugs on a Blue Fish (2003) "100 Days (Heron)"
- The Crystal Method – Legion of Boom (2003) "Born Too Slow"
- Biblical Proof of UFO's – Interstellar Messages (2004) "Passive Aggressive", "Two Minute Warning"
- Danko Jones – Sleep Is the Enemy (2006) "Invisible"
- Waxy – Chainsaw Holiday (2007) "White Walls"
- Danko Jones – Never Too Loud (2008) "Forest for the Trees"
- Arsenal – Lotuk (2008) "Not a Man", "Diggin a Hole"
- Monkey3 – Undercover (2009) "Watchin' You"
- Mad City Rockers – Black Celebration (2009) "Stronger"
- Karma to Burn – Appalachian Incantation (2010) "Two Times" (bonus track)
- Mondo Generator – Hell Comes to Your Heart (2012) "Won't Let Go", "The Last Train"
- Steak – Slab City (2014) "Pisser"
- Zun – Burial Sunrise (2016) "Nothing Farther", "All for Nothing", "All That You Say I Am"
