= List of stoner rock and metal bands =

This is a comprehensive list of notable bands described as stoner rock or stoner metal/stoner doom. It includes any musical groups that have incorporated the genre into their music at some point in their career.

== # ==
- 1000mods
- 35007

== A ==
- Abramis Brama
- Acid King
- Acrimony
- All Them Witches
- Arctic Monkeys
- The Atomic Bitchwax

== B ==
- Baroness
- Beaver
- Big Scenic Nowhere
- Bison
- Black Moth
- Black Mountain
- Black NASA
- Black River
- Black Spiders
- Black Sabbath
- Black Tusk
- Blood Duster
- Bokassa
- Bongripper
- Bongzilla
- Boris
- Brant Bjork and the Bros
- Brant Bjork and the Low Desert Punk Band

== C ==
- Cathedral
- Ché
- Chrome Locust
- Church of Misery
- Colour Haze
- Core
- Corrosion of Conformity
- CKY
- Clutch
- Crystal Fairy

== D ==
- Dead Meadow
- Demon Cleaner
- Dern Rutlidge
- The Desert Sessions
- Down
- Dozer
- Dragpipe
- Dr Colossus
- Drunk Horse

== E ==
- Earthless
- Earthlings?
- Electric Citizen
- Electric Wizard
- Elder

== F ==
- Far from Alaska
- Fatso Jetson
- Feast
- The Fierce and the Dead
- Fireball Ministry
- Fort
- Fu Manchu

== G ==
- Goatsnake
- Greenleaf
- Green Lung
- Gnome

== H ==
- The Hanging Tree
- Hermano
- High on Fire
- Holy Mountain
- Halfway to Gone

== K ==
- Karma to Burn
- The Kings of Frog Island
- Kylesa
- Kyng
- Kyuss

== L ==
- Los Natas
- Lowrider

== M ==
- Mannhai
- Mars Red Sky
- Masters of Reality
- Mastodon
- Melvins
- The Midnight Ghost Train
- Misdemeanor
- Mondo Generator
- Monkey3
- Monster Magnet
- The Mushroom River Band
- Mustasch

== N ==
- Nebula
- Neurosis
- Nightstalker

== O ==
- The Obsessed
- Om
- Orange Goblin

== P ==
- Part Chimp
- Pigs Pigs Pigs Pigs Pigs Pigs Pigs
- Pod People
- Pulled Apart by Horses

== Q ==
- Qoph
- Queens of the Stone Age
- The Quill

== R ==
- Raging Speedhorn
- Red Aim
- Red Fang
- Rollerball
- Royal Blood

== S ==
- Saint Vitus
- Sasquatch
- Saviours
- Seemless
- Sheavy
- Sir Lord Baltimore
- Sixty Watt Shaman
- Sleep
- Sleepy Sun
- Slift
- Slo Burn
- Sofa King Killer
- Solace
- Somali Yacht Club
- Sons of Alpha Centauri
- Sons of Otis
- Spirit Caravan
- Spiritual Beggars
- Stoned Jesus
- Stonefield
- Stöner
- The Sword

== T ==
- Terra Firma
- Them Crooked Vultures
- Torche
- Totimoshi
- Transport League
- Trouble
- Truckfighters
- True Widow

== U ==
- Ufomammut
- Uncle Acid & the Deadbeats
- Unida

== V ==
- Vista Chino

== W ==
- Waxy
- Weedeater
- Wet Nuns
- White Miles
- Windhand
- Winnebago Deal
- Witch
- Wolfmother
- The Workhorse Movement

== X ==
- Xysma

== Y ==
- Yawning Man
- Year Long Disaster
- Yob
- Youngblood Supercult
