= Atomic Bitchwax II =

Studio album by The Atomic Bitchwax
- Released: October 31, 2000
- Recorded: May–June 2000
- Genre: Stoner metal
- Label: Tee Pee Records
- Producer: The Atomic Bitchwax

The Atomic Bitchwax chronology
The Atomic Bitchwax (1999)	Atomic Bitchwax II (2000)	Spit Blood (EP) (2002)

Professional ratings
Review scores
Source	Rating
AllMusic	2/5 stars
Metal Hammer	8/10

Atomic Bitchwax II (also abbreviated as II) is the second studio album by American rock band The Atomic Bitchwax, released on October 31, 2000, via Tee Pee Records.

== Track listing ==
All songs by The Atomic Bitchwax unless noted.

1. "Ice Pick Freek" – 2:56
2. "Forty-Five" – 3:50
3. "Play the Game" (Atomic Rooster) – 3:52
4. "Smokescreen" – 5:53
5. "Cast Aside Your Masks" – 5:08
6. "The Cloning Chamber" – 2:51
7. "Marching on the Skulls of the Dead" – 5:06
8. "Dishing Out a Heavy Dose of Tough Love" – 3:58
9. "Solid" – 8:17
10. "Liquor Queen" – 2:47

== Personnel ==
- Chris Kosnik - bass, vocals
- Ed Mundell - guitar
- Keith Ackerman - drums, percussion

Additional musicians

- Warren Haynes - lead guitar on "Smokescreen"
- Jordan Shapiro - organ on "Play the Game"
