= The Hustle Is On =

Studio album by Core
- Released: 1999
- Genre: Stoner rock, grunge, psychedelic rock
- Label: MIA Records/Tee Pee Records
- Producer: Core

The Hustle Is On is the second album released by Core. The album was produced and mixed by Core. Tracks 1, 2, 4, 5, and 7 were recorded at Sub Sound and engineered by Stacey "Springdale" Phelon (engineer on Monster Magnet's first album Spine of God). The other tracks were recorded at Trax East with Eric Rachell. It was mastered at West Side Music by Al Douches.

The album mixes stoner, psychedelic rock, punk and jazz, and contains several instrumental tracks.

== Track listing ==
All songs written by Core.

1. "The Monolith Problem" - 5:49
2. "Supernumber" - 4:49
3. "LD.5°" - 1:05
4. "Fleetwood" - 2:31
5. "Sarah's Curious Accident" - 4:17
6. "No.5 in a Series" - 0:47
7. "Vacuum Life" - 3:20
8. "Square and Round" - 3:50
9. "Skinny Legs and All" - 1:44
10. "(Untitled)" - 0:51
11. "Bicycle and Tricycle" - 4:41
12. "Edge City" - 6:08
13. "Blues for Gus (AuH2O)" - 15:24

== Personnel ==
- Tim Ryan - percussion
- Carmine Pernini - basses
- Finn Ryan - guitars, vocals
- Other instruments played by Core – acoustic guitar, acoustic bass

== Reception ==
Riff Relevant stated the album is "amazing and ass-kicking." Tinnitist.com and TheObelisk.net also gave positive reviews.
