= William the Conqueror (disambiguation) =

William the Conqueror was the first Norman King of England, in power from 1066 to 1087.

William the Conqueror may also refer to:

- William the Conqueror (band), three-piece British band, formed by Ruarri Joseph in 2016
- William the Conqueror (short story collection), a book of short stories by Richmal Crompton
- William the Conqueror (film), a 2017 film directed by Fabien Drugeonp

== See also ==
- Cultural depictions of William the Conqueror
