= Neptune with Fire =

Studio album by Ancestors
- Released: March 24, 2008
- Recorded: 2007 at 48 Windows in Santa Monica, CA
- Genres: Psychedelic rock, progressive rock, doom metal, stoner rock, hard rock
- Length: 38:28
- Label: Tee Pee Records / North Atlantic Sound
- Producers: Ancestors & Scott Crisp

Ancestors chronology
| Neptune with Fire (2008) | Of Sound Mind (2009) |

Professional ratings
Review scores
| Source | Rating |
|---|---|
| AbsolutePunk.net | 70% link |
| AllMusic | link |
| Artrocker | link |
| Brave Words & Bloody Knuckles | 8/10 stars |
| Chartattack.com | link |
| Decibel Magazine | 8/10 stars |
| Foxy Digitalis | link |
| High Times | 3.5/4 stars |
| Metal Hammer | 8/10 stars |
| Mojo Magazine | 3/5 stars |
| Outburn Magazine | 7/10 stars |
| Pitchfork | 7.7/10 link |
| Pittsburgh Daily News | 3.5/5 stars |
| Punknews.org | link |
| Revolver Magazine | 3.5/5 stars |
| Rock Sound | 7/10 stars |

Neptune with Fire is the debut release by Los Angeles–based metal band Ancestors. It was released in the European Union on March 24, 2008, and in the United States on August 18, 2008.

Neptune With Fire is a concept album that tells of metaphorical characters (namely Neptune on the title track and Orcus on the first track), and their cosmic, psychological journey through war, celebration, remorse and revelation. The character of Neptune was written as an immortal personification of the mortal man, and for the band, his plight was conceived of as a way of realizing their own epistemological struggles.

The album's artwork was created by Arik Roper.

== Track listing ==
| No. | Title | Length |
|---|---|---|
| 1. | "Orcus' Avarice" | 16:48 |
| 2. | "Neptune With Fire" | 21:40 |
| Total length: | | 38:28 |
