= Boxriff =

EP by The Atomic Bitchwax
- Released: 2006
- Recorded: 2005
- Genre: Stoner metal
- Label: MeteorCity
- Producer: Jack Endino

The Atomic Bitchwax chronology
3 (2005)	Boxriff (2006)	TAB 4 (2008)

Boxriff is an EP by American rock band The Atomic Bitchwax, released in November 2006 via MeteorCity. It contains four new studio songs and a live set recorded at the Sunset Tavern in Seattle on November 11, 2005. It is accompanied by a live DVD of the same performance.

== Track listing ==
All songs by The Atomic Bitchwax unless noted.

1. "STD" – 4:06
2. "So Come On" – 4:11
3. "Turn Me On" – 5:11
4. "Kiss the Sun" (Core) – 3:55
5. "Intro" – 1:20
6. "Force Field" –2:11
7. "Hey Alright" – 3:09
8. "Kiss the Sun" (Core) – 3:45
9. "Stork Theme" (Joe Calandra/Joe Kleiman/Ed Mundell) – 2:11
10. "The Cloning Chamber" – 2:51
11. "The Destroyer" – 3:44
12. "Maybe I'm a Leo" (Deep Purple) – 3:23
13. "Gettin' Old" – 4:29
14. "Ice Pick Freak" – 2:42
15. "Forty-Five" – 3:20
16. "Birth to the Earth" – 3:51
17. "Shit Kicker" –3:48
- Tracks 5–17 are live

=== DVD tracks ===
1. "Intro"
2. "Force Field"
3. "Hey Alright"
4. "Kiss the Sun" (Core)
5. "Stork Theme" (Joe Calandra/Joe Kleiman/Ed Mundell)
6. "The Cloning Chamber"
7. "The Destroyer"
8. "Maybe I'm a Leo" (Deep Purple)
9. "Gettin' Old"
10. "Ice Pick Freak"
11. "Forty-Five"
12. "Birth to the Earth"
13. "Shit Kicker"

== Critical reception ==
Professional ratings
Review scores
Source	Rating
AllMusic	3.5/5 stars

Reviews of Boxriff were generally positive, with the track music stated as "stoner rock with gargantuan riffs and trippy sonics" as well as appreciation for the live set music. Note was also made that the "boogie metal" of the album was the most accessible for TAB's music, opening it to a larger audience.
