= Force Field (album) =

Studio album by The Atomic Bitchwax
- Released: December 8, 2017
- Recorded: September 2017
- Genre: Stoner rock
- Length: 37:26
- Label: Tee Pee

The Atomic Bitchwax chronology
Gravitron (2015)	Force Field (2017)

Professional ratings
Review scores
Source	Rating
New Noise	4/5 stars
The Obelisk	Favorable

Force Field is the seventh studio album by American rock band The Atomic Bitchwax. It was released December 8, 2017 through Tee Pee Records.

== Track listing ==
All tracks are written by The Atomic Bitchwax

No.	Title	Length
1.	"Hippie Speedball"	2:26
2.	"Earth Shaker"	3:07
3.	"Alaskan Thunder Fuck"	3:47
4.	"Shocker"	2:08
5.	"Crazy"	2:59
6.	"Fried Dyed and Layin to the Side"	3:06
7.	"Shell of a Man"	3:14
8.	"Houndstooth"	2:37
9.	"Tits and Bones"	2:46
10.	"Humble Brad"	2:52
11.	"Super Highway"	2:44
12.	"Liv a Little"	2:41
