= 3 (The Atomic Bitchwax album) =

Studio album by The Atomic Bitchwax
- Released: June 7, 2005
- Recorded: February 2005
- Studio: Trax East
- Genre: Stoner metal
- Label: MeteorCity
- Producer: Eric Rachel, The Atomic Bitchwax

The Atomic Bitchwax chronology
Spit Blood (EP) (2002)	3 (2005)	Boxriff (EP+Live) (2006)

Professional ratings
Review scores
Source	Rating
AllMusic	3.5/5 stars

3 is the third studio album by American rock band The Atomic Bitchwax, released on June 7, 2005 via MeteorCity. It was the first album recorded with lead guitarist Finn Ryan of the band Core.

== Track listing ==
All tracks are written by The Atomic Bitchwax, except where noted

No.	Title	Length
1.	"The Destroyer"	2:53
2.	"You Oughta Know"	4:05
3.	"You Can't Win"	4:18
4.	"Dark Chi"	4:29
5.	"Maybe I'm a Leo" (Deep Purple cover)	4:13
6.	"Force Field"	2:15
7.	"Going Guido"	4:21
8.	"The Passenger"	4:07
9.	"If I Had a Gun"	4:08
10.	"Half as Much"	3:54

== Personnel ==
- Chris Kosnik – bass, vocals
- Keith Ackerman – drums, percussion
- Finn Ryan – guitar, vocals
