= All That Is Heavy =

American online music store

All That is Heavy
- Company type: Online Record Store
- Industry: Music industry
- Founded: 1997
- Headquarters: Houston, Texas
- Key people: Casey & Taylor Kelch
- Products: CDs, DVDs, vinyl, t-shirts
- Website: AllThatisHeavy.com

All That is Heavy (originally All That's Heavy) is an online music store based in Houston and founded in 1997. It is the first online record store dedicated exclusively to the genres of stoner rock, doom metal, sludge metal, drone metal and psychedelic rock. All That is Heavy was originally owned and operated MeteorCity Records, which was instrumental in the growth of the late 1990s stoner rock scene. Distributed labels, besides their formerly in-house MeteorCity Records include Tee Pee Records, Volcom Entertainment, Small Stone Records, Rise Above Records, and others. The store was operated by the now defunct StonerRock.com from 2001 to 2010, and was owned by Dan Beland. On 25 August 2017, it was announced that All That Is Heavy would be taken into new ownership by Casey Kelch and moved to Houston.

== History ==
All That's Heavy was founded in September 1997 by Jadd Shickler (of band Spiritu) and Aaron Emmel in Albuquerque, New Mexico. Its first incarnation was an online store selling hard-to-find releases by stoner rock bands Kyuss, Monster Magnet, and Fu Manchu. They soon expanded the catalog to include artists which stylistically fit with the first three bands.

After running the online store for about six months, they were contacted by the former proprietor for the first Kyuss fan website. He recommended MeteorCity do a compilation of unsigned bands that Kyuss fans would enjoy. MeteorCity Records was formed, and the result of the suggestion was the compilation Welcome to MeteorCity, which was released in May 1997. The compilation included both established desert and stoner rock acts, including new bands established by John Garcia of Kyuss (now in Unida), Ed Mundell of Monster Magnet, and Pete Stahl. The album was the first time that the bands Sixty Watt Shaman, Lowrider, The Atomic Bitchwax, Dozer, Goatsnake, Drag Pack, and Los Natas were heard on a record. The record label and store both increased in popularity after the release. Around that time a MeteorCity intern purportedly coined the term desert rock to describe the burgeoning genre, which is still used interchangeably with the more known descriptor "stoner rock".

=== Change of ownership ===
As the scene continued to develop, the popular website StonerRock.com was launched by Dan Beland in 1999. The website became a central community hub for heavy music artists and fans, and frequently featured reviews and interviews with stoner rock musicians. In March 2001, MeteorCity licensed StonerRock.com to take over management and operations of All That's Heavy (ATH). ATH's catalog grew to become the largest online store of stoner rock, doom metal, sludge metal, drone metal and psychedelic rock. MeteorCity in turn began to focus more on the label. ATH was officially sold to Beland and Melanie Streko of StonerRock.com on May 15, 2004 and renamed All That is Heavy. In 2007, Shickler and Emmel sold MeteorCity Records to Beland and Streko as well. In 2010, StonerRock.com was taken offline, and MeteorCity Records became the official label for ATH.

Citing personal reasons, Streko resigned. Beland became sole owner of ATH in 2014, and announced the possibility of selling the site in the summer of 2017. On 25 August 2017, it was announced that All That Is Heavy would be taken into new ownership by Casey Kelch and the headquarters would be in Houston.
