= Of Sound Mind =

Studio album by Ancestors
- Released: October 5, 2009
- Recorded: 2009
- Studios: Infrasonic Sound in Los Angeles, California
- Genres: Psychedelic rock, stoner rock, space rock, progressive metal
- Length: 71:27
- Label: Tee Pee
- Producers: Ancestors and Pete Lyman

Ancestors chronology
| Neptune with Fire (2008) | Of Sound Mind (2009) | In Dreams and Time (2012) |

Professional ratings
Review scores
| Source | Rating |
|---|---|
| About.com | 4/5 stars |
| AllMusic | 4/5 stars |
| Classic Rock | 8/10 stars |
| Metal Sucks | 4/5 |
| Tiny Mix Tapes | 4/5 marks |

Of Sound Mind is the second album by Los Angeles–based psychedelic rock band Ancestors, released by Tee Pee Records on October 5, 2009, in the European Union and October 6, 2009, in the United States. The album's artwork was created by Derek Albeck.

== Track listing ==
| No. | Title | Length |
|---|---|---|
| 1. | "From Nothing" | 1:01 |
| 2. | "Mother Animal" | 14:32 |
| 3. | "Not the Last Return" | 1:29 |
| 4. | "Bounty of Age" | 13:45 |
| 5. | "A Friend" | 3:06 |
| 6. | "The Trial" | 17:34 |
| 7. | "Challenging" | 6:26 |
| 8. | "The Ambrose Law" | 13:32 |
| Total length: | | 71:27 |
