= The Last Embrace =

Compilation album by Spirit Caravan
- Released: 2003
- Genre: Doom metal, stoner metal
- Label: MeteorCity Records

Spirit Caravan chronology
Elusive Truth (2001)	The Last Embrace (2003)

Professional ratings
Review scores
Source	Rating
Allmusic	link

The Last Embrace is the final album released by American band Spirit Caravan. It was released on 2×CD and 2×LP in 2003 by Meteor City Records. It contains 19 songs from their two albums, Jug Fulla Sun and Elusive Truth, the three songs that appeared on their debut 7-inch (under the name "Shine"), the two songs from their final 7-inch, Spirit Caravan, the song from their split 7-inch with Sixty Watt Shaman, and their song from the Rise 13 compilation on Rise Above Records. It also features the last three songs Spirit Caravan recorded, "The Last Embrace", "Brainwashed" and "Dove-Tongued Aggressor".

== Track listing ==
=== Disc 1 ===
1. "The Last Embrace" – 4:18 (previously unreleased)
2. "Brainwashed" – 4:43 (previously unreleased)
3. "Healing Tongue" – 2:28
4. "Cosmic Artifact" – 5:51
5. "Fear's Machine" – 3:27
6. "Dead Love/Jug Fulla Sun" – 8:00
7. "Fang" – 4:57
8. "Chaw" – 2:13
9. "Melancholy Grey" – 5:19
10. "Sea Legs" – 4:22
11. "Kill Ugly Naked" – 2:18
12. "No Hope Goat Farm" – 3:46
13. "Courage" – 3:56 (Shine 7-inch version)
14. "Powertime" – 2:48 (Shine 7-inch version)
15. "Lost Sun Dance" – 4:19 (Shine 7-inch version)

=== Disc 2 ===
1. "Dove-Tongued Aggressor" – 4:25 (previously unreleased)
2. "So Mortal Be" – 3:37 (from Spirit Caravan 7-inch)
3. "Undone Mind" – 4:14 (from Spirit Caravan 7-inch)
4. "Spirit Caravan" – 3:06
5. "Black Flower" – 5:28
6. "Retroman" – 5:33
7. "Find It" – 3:52
8. "Futility's Reasons" – 5:12
9. "Cloudy Mirror" – 3:26
10. "Elusive Truth" – 4:29
11. "Lifer City" – 2:21
12. "Outlaw Wizard" – 1:31
13. "Darkness and Longing" – 4:02 (7-inch split with Sixty Watt Shaman version)
14. "The Departure" – 5:40 (Rise 13 version)
