= Music for the World Beyond =

Music from the World Beyond

Studio album by The Mushroom River Band
- Released: 2000
- Recorded: 1999/2000
- Genre: Stoner rock
- Length: 45:17
- Label: MeteorCity Records

The Mushroom River Band chronology
No Quarter Recordings (1999)	Music from the World Beyond (2000)	Simsalabim (2002)

Professional ratings
Review scores
Source	Rating
AllMusic	3/5 stars

Music from the World Beyond is the first album by stoner rock quartet The Mushroom River Band. It was released in 2000 and contains twelve tracks.

== Track listing ==
1. "To the World Beyond"
2. "Mud-Crusher"
3. "Racing"
4. "Way to Go"
5. "29' 2½"
6. "The Mushroom River"
7. "More Beer"
8. "Addicted"
9. "Sir B's Tune"
10. "A Sad Story"
11. "Nurse"
12. "Free"
13. "Loser's Blues" (bonus track for Japan only)
