= Ancestors (band) =

American doom metal band

- Origin: Los Angeles, California, United States
- Genres: Psychedelic rock, progressive rock, doom metal, stoner rock, post-metal
- Years active: 2006–2019
- Labels: Tee Pee Records, North Atlantic Sound
- Past members: Justin Maranga; Nick Long; Jason Watkins; Matt Barks; Daniel Pouliot; Chico Foley; Brandon Pierce

Ancestors was an American five-piece doom metal ensemble, residing in Los Angeles, California, United States.

== Biography ==
Justin Maranga, Nick Long and Brandon Pierce began a three-piece project in the summer of 2006; afterwards, the band added Englishman Chico Foley, who had met Brandon shortly after taking up what was at the time a temporary residence in Los Angeles. The band later added Jason Christopher Watkins as a member.

They released their debut in Europe in April 2008 on North Atlantic Sound, a division of Tee Pee Records; and in August 2008 in the United States on Tee Pee Records. Artwork for the record was produced by Arik Roper, who has also worked with Sleep, High on Fire, and Earth.

In October 2009 the band released their second album, Of Sound Mind on Tee Pee Records. The double LP was produced by the band and Pete Lyman while the artwork was done by Derek Albeck. It featured cameo performances by David Scott Stone (Melvins, Unwound, Slug), Sera Timms (Black Math Horseman) and cellist Ramiro Zapata.

In 2010 the band parted ways with Chico Foley, and synth/guitar player Matt Barks joined the band in his place. They entered the studio in early 2011 to record the Invisible White EP, which was released on June 26, 2011 via Tee Pee Records. The EP was produced by Kenny Woods.

=== Influences ===
Ancestors have been influenced by progressive rock, psychedelic rock, and heavier stoner rock and doom metal. They have also tried to implement an amount of experimental music and musique concrète influence. However, despite their influences, they never set out to have any specific sound when they write music.

== Band members ==
- Justin Maranga - guitar, vocals (2006-2019)
- Nick Long - bass, vocals (2006-2016; died 2023)
- Jason Watkins - organ, piano, electric piano, mellotron, vocals (2006-2019)
- Matt Barks - modular synthesizer, Moog synthesizer, guitar, vocals (2010-2016)
- Daniel Pouliot - drums (2011-2019)
- Chico Foley - synthesizer, electronics, vocals (2006-2010)
- Brandon Pierce - drums, gong (2006-2011)

Timeline

== Discography ==
=== Albums ===
- Neptune with Fire (Tee Pee Records) (2008)
- Of Sound Mind (Tee Pee Records) (2009)
- In Dreams and Time (Tee Pee Records) (2012)
- Suspended In Reflections (Pelagic Records) (2018)

=== EP's and Singles ===
- Ancestors / Graveyard - Split 7" (Volcom) (2009)
- Invisible White (EP) (Tee Pee Records) (2011)
