= Simsalabim =

Studio album by The Mushroom River Band
- Released: 2002
- Recorded: 2002
- Genre: Heavy metal Hard rock Stoner rock
- Length: 43:07
- Label: MeteorCity Records

The Mushroom River Band chronology
Music for the World Beyond (2000)	Simsalabim (2002)

Professional ratings
Review scores
Source	Rating
AllMusic	4/5 stars

Simsalabim is the second album by stoner rock quartet The Mushroom River Band. It was released in 2002 and contains ten tracks.

== Track listing ==
1. "Simsalabim"
2. "Bugs"
3. "Make It Happen"
4. "Change It"
5. "My Vote Is Blank"
6. "Tree of No Hope"
7. "Proud of Being Cool"
8. "Time-Laps"
9. "The Big Sick Machine"
10. "Run Run Run"
11. "Enemies We Stay" (bonus track for Japan)
12. "D.D.D" (bonus track on LP version)
