= The Hidden Hand (band) =

American metal band

- Origin: Potomac, Maryland, U.S.
- Genres: Doom metal, stoner metal
- Years active: 2002–2007
- Labels: Southern Lord, MeteorCity, McCarthyism, Exile on Mainstream
- Spinoffs: The Obsessed, Saint Vitus, Spirit Caravan, Place of Skulls
- Past members: Scott "Wino" Weinrich; Bruce Falkinburg; Matt Moulis; Dave Hennessy; Evan Tanner
- Website: thehiddenhand.com

The Hidden Hand was an American stoner rock and doom metal band from Maryland, formed in 2002 and dissolved in 2007.

== History ==
The Hidden Hand was formed as a trio by guitarist and vocalist Scott "Wino" Weinrich and bassist and vocalist Bruce Falkinburg in 2002, shortly after the dissolution of Spirit Caravan in May of that year. The band worked with three different drummers over its five-year lifespan. Weinrich had previously played in The Obsessed, Saint Vitus, Spirit Caravan, and Place of Skulls. Falkinburg (1969–2022) worked as a professional recording engineer, and his Phase Recording studio in College Park, Maryland, had recorded albums by Clutch, Sixty Watt Shaman, and Stinking Lizaveta.

The band released their debut 7" single, De-Sensitized, in late 2002, followed quickly by their first full-length album, Divine Propaganda, in 2003. They then released a split LP/CD with Washington, D.C. band Wooly Mammoth, which coincided with their appearance at the Emissions from the Monolith festival.

Their second album, Mother Teacher Destroyer, was released on Southern Lord Records in 2004. Following that release, original drummer Dave Hennessy departed to focus on his own band, Ostinato, and was replaced by Evan Tanner. Tanner left in 2006 after recording the band's third album, The Resurrection of Whiskey Foote, and was succeeded by Matt Moulis, who had previously played in DC-area bands Medic and Bison.

Musically, the band represented a shift in style for Weinrich. The Hidden Hand incorporated stronger psychedelic influences and addressed themes of politics, history, and spirituality in their lyrics. Weinrich described the band by saying, "The Hidden Hand is political," distinguishing it from his previous work.

The band dissolved in August 2007, with Weinrich subsequently rejoining Saint Vitus. Falkinburg later briefly joined The Obsessed during their 2016–17 reunion before his death on July 12, 2022.

== Members ==
- Scott "Wino" Weinrich – guitar, vocals
- Bruce Falkinburg – bass, vocals
- Matt Moulis – drums (2006–2007)
- Evan Tanner – drums (2004–2006)
- Dave Hennessy – drums (2002–2004)

== Discography ==
=== Studio albums ===
- Divine Propaganda (2003, MeteorCity Records/Exile On Mainstream Records/Beard of Stars Records)
- Mother Teacher Destroyer (2004, Southern Lord Records/Exile On Mainstream Records)
- The Resurrection of Whiskey Foote (2007, Southern Lord Records; 2009 LP reissue, Doomentia Records)

=== EPs and splits ===
- De-Sensitized 7" (2002, McCarthyism Records)
- Night Letters split with Wooly Mammoth (2004, MeteorCity Records/McCarthyism Records)
- Devoid of Colour (2005, Southern Lord Records)

=== Compilation appearances ===
- "Rebellion" on Doom Capital (2004, Crucial Blast Records)
- "Falconstone" on High Volume (The Stoner Rock Collection) (2004, High Times Records)
- "Half Mast" on Music from Time and Space Vol. 11 (2004, Sysyphus Records)
- "Someday Soon" on Darkness Knows No Boundaries (2006, Southern Lord Records)
- "Vulcans' Children" on Darkness Hath No Boundaries (2006, Southern Lord Records)
- "Five Points" on ...And Back to Earth Again: Ten Years of MeteorCity (2007, MeteorCity Records)
- "Dark Horizons" on Within the Church of Thee Overlords (2007, Southern Lord Records)
- "Coffin Lily" on Worship the Riff (2007, Exile on Mainstream)
