= The Dark Won't Hide You =

Studio album by Night Horse
- Released: October 21, 2008
- Recorded: July 2008 at Donner and Blitzen, Arcadia, CA
- Genre: Hard rock
- Length: 32:55
- Label: Tee Pee Records
- Producer: Night Horse & Mathias Schneeberger

Professional ratings
Review scores
Source	Rating
Classic Rock Magazine	7/10 stars
Kerrang!	4/5 stars
Metal Hammer	7/10 stars
Brave Words & Bloody Knuckles	9/10 stars
Decibel Magazine	7/10 stars
Rock Sound	8/10 stars
Outburn Magazine	7/10 stars

The Dark Won't Hide You is the debut release by Los Angeles-based rock band Night Horse. It was recorded in Mathias Schneeberger's "Donner & Blitzen" studio in Arcadia, California.

The artwork was created by the members of the band.

The song "Heart and Soul" was made available as a bonus track for online download through digital retailers like iTunes and Amazon.com. The vinyl LP version of the album also includes a "dropcard" enabling purchasers to download the album, including the bonus track, for free.

== Track listing ==
1. "Don't Need Your Lovin'" - 6:24
2. "The Dark Won't Hide You" - 4:47
3. "Wicked Love" - 5:19
4. "Shine On Me" - 5:35
5. "Worried Life Blues" - 4:23
6. "For You (Greg's Lament)" - 6:29

== Online bonus track ==
1. "Heart and Soul" - 4:03
