= Gravitron (album) =

Studio album by The Atomic Bitchwax
- Released: 2015
- Label: Tee Pee Records

The Atomic Bitchwax chronology
The Local Fuzz (2011)	Gravitron (2015)	Force Field (2017)

Professional ratings
Review scores
Source	Rating
Blurt	4/5 stars
Metal Temple	7/10 stars
New Noise Magazine	4/5 stars
This Is Not a Scene	9.5/10

Gravitron is the sixth studio album by American rock band The Atomic Bitchwax, released in 2015 via Tee Pee Records.

== Track listing ==
1. "Sexecutioner" – 2:48
2. "No Way Man" – 3:22
3. "It's Alright" – 2:56
4. "War Claw" – 2:52
5. "Coming in Hot" – 3:54
6. "Fuckface [Explicit]" – 2:52
7. "Proto World" – 4:03
8. "Down with the Swirl" – 3:04
9. "Roseland" – 2:59
10. "Ice Age "Hey Baby"" – 4:45

== Personnel ==
- Chris Kosnik – bass, vocals
- Finn Ryan – guitar, vocals
- Bob Pantella – drums, percussion
