= Rocketcrash =

Rocketcrach

EP by The Mushroom River Band
- Released: 1999
- Recorded: 1998
- Genre: Stoner rock
- Length: 17:05
- Label: Tea Pot Records

The Mushroom River Band chronology
The Mushroom River Band (1996)	Rocketcrach (1999)	No Quarter Recordings (1999)

Rocketcrash is the first material released by The Mushroom River Band. It was released in 1998, under the band's own label, Tea Pot Records.

== Track listing ==
1. "Twin Lyrics #1"
2. "Super Insomnia"
3. "B.M."
4. "Loser's Blues"
