= Black NASA =

New Jersey stoner rock band

- Origin: Long Branch, New Jersey, U.S.
- Genres: Hard rock, stoner rock
- Years active: 2000–2005
- Labels: Tee Pee, MeteorCity
- Past members: Chris Kosnik; Duane Hutter; Corey Stubblefield

Black NASA is a New Jersey–based rock band, often placed in the stoner rock genre. They formed in the early 2000s in Long Branch, and were active while the guitarist in Kosnik's other band (The Atomic Bitchwax) was busy with Monster Magnet. The band has a heavy 70s feel. They have not been active since touring to support Deuce. The band's name refers to NASA conspiracies in general, and is unrelated to the Old Negro Space Program. Duane Hutter and Corey Stubblefield have been playing a new band called 40 POUND HOUND since 2014.

== Members ==
- Chris Kosnik – bass, Vox, guitar, synthesizer (of Godspeed and The Atomic Bitchwax)
- Duane Hutter – guitar, slide guitar, dobro, harmonica (of Solace an 40 Pound Hound)
- Corey Stubblefeld – drums, percussion (of Three Day Funk, Viscosity Jones and Muffled Crap)

== Discography ==
- Black NASA (2002) Tee Pee Records
- Deuce (2004) MeteorCity

=== Compilations ===
- Sucking the 70's (2002) Small Stone Records
