= The Local Fuzz =

Studio album by The Atomic Bitchwax
- Released: 2011
- Length: 42:16
- Label: Tee Pee

The Atomic Bitchwax chronology
TAB 4 (2008)	The Local Fuzz (2011)	Gravitron (2015)

The Local Fuzz is the fifth studio album by American rock band The Atomic Bitchwax, released in 2011 by Tee Pee Records. Consisting of a single extended piece of music it was based on the intention of "50 riffs in 40 minutes".

== Track listing ==
All songs by The Atomic Bitchwax unless noted.

1. "The Local Fuzz" – 42:16

== Critical reception ==
The Local Fuzz was noted as a somewhat strange addition to TAB's music, given the single song, however it was rated moderately positively. PopMatters rated it as 6/10 and "ambitious and well-executed", although requiring significant adaptation from the band's usual audience.
