= Spit Blood =

EP by The Atomic Bitchwax
- Released: 2002
- Label: MeteorCity

The Atomic Bitchwax chronology
Atomic Bitchwax II (2000)	Spit Blood (2002)	3 (2005)

Spit Blood is the second EP by American rock band The Atomic Bitchwax, released in March 2002 via MeteorCity.

== Track listing ==
1. "Dirty Deeds Done Dirt Cheap" (AC/DC cover) – 4:12
2. "Liquor Queen" – 3:59
3. "Get Your Gear" – 5:34
4. "Cold Day in Hell" – 6:47
5. "Spit Blood" – 4:16
6. "Black Trans-Am" – 4:11
7. "U Want I Should" – 4:19

== Critical reception ==
Reception was overall moderately negative. Reviews positively rated the first song ("Dirty Deeds Done Dirt Cheap") and the last ("U Want I Should") but felt the remaining tracks were poor quality filler, with the music overall of a lower quality than previous music by the band.
