= Misdemeanor (Swedish band) =

Swedish stoner rock band

Misdemeanor was a female stoner rock band from Sweden. Its members were Vera Olofsson (vocals), Jenny Möllberg (guitar), Jenny Lindahl (bass), Sara Fredriksson (guitar), and Mia Möllberg (drums). They released two studio albums, Misdemeanor in 2002 and High Crimes and Misdemeanor in 2004. In 1999, Misdemeanor collaborated with ex-Kyuss vocalist John Garcia, who sang the fourth song, "Love Song", on their EP Five Wheel Drive. Monsterriff described the group's sound as "radio-friendly Stoner Rock, similar to Songs for the Deaf-era Queens of the Stone Age".

== Discography ==
Studio albums

- Misdemeanor – Muse Entity Records (2002)
- High Crimes and Misdemeanor – Muse Entity Records (2004)

Other releases

- Misdemeanor EP 7" – Psychout Records (1997)
- Five Wheel Drive EP – MeteorCity (1999)
- You're Nothing (And You Know It) /Y.S.B.T. 7" – Freakscene Records (1999)
- Let Me Know/The Hard One 7" – Muse Entity Records (2002)
