= Cultural depictions of William the Conqueror =

William I of England has been depicted in a number of modern works.

== In drama, film and television ==
William I has appeared as a character in several stage and screen productions. The one-act play A Choice of Kings by John Mortimer deals with his deception of Harold after the latter's shipwreck. Julian Glover portrayed him in a 1966 TV adaptation of this play in the ITV Play of the Week series.

William has also been portrayed on screen by Thayer Roberts in the 1955 film Lady Godiva of Coventry, John Carson in the 1965 BBC TV series Hereward the Wake, Alan Dobie in the two-part 1966 BBC TV play Conquest (part of the series Theatre 625), and Michael Gambon in the 1990 TV drama Blood Royal: William the Conqueror.

Films about William's life include the 1982 French/Romanian production "William the Conqueror" (a.k.a. Guillaume le Conquérant or Wilhelm Cuceritorul), directed by Sergiu Nicolaescu and Gilles Grangier, where Hervé Bellon played William. The 2015 French production Guillaume, la jeunesse du conquérant (a.k.a. William the Conqueror), directed by Fabien Drugeon, focused on William's early life. In this film William was played by Jean-Damien Détouillon.

William has also been portrayed by David Lodge in a 1975 episode of the TV comedy series Carry On Laughing entitled "One in the Eye for Harold" and by James Fleet in the 1999 humorous BBC show The Nearly Complete and Utter History of Everything. He has been portrayed in the BBC show Horrible Histories by Simon Farnaby up to Series 5, Kevin Eldon in Series 6, and James McNicholas from Series 9 onwards.

A fictional version of William was played by Nikolaj Coster-Waldau in the 2025 BBC series King & Conqueror.

== On radio ==
Stephen Dillane played William in the 2001 radio play Bayeux by Simon Armitage and Jeff Young, based on the Bayeux Tapestry.

== In literature ==
William I has been depicted in historical novels and short stories. They include:

- William the Conqueror:an Historical Romance (1858) by Charles James Napier. A historical romance, covering events from 1042 to 1066. The setting includes the Duchy of Normandy, the County of Flanders, the Kingdom of France, and the Kingdom of England. The novel places some emphas on the early life of William I, and on the events leading up to his marriage to Matilda of Flanders. Also covered are the marriage and crowning of Harold Godwinson, the Battle of Stamford Bridge, and the Battle of Hastings. The latter covered in detail. William himself is the protagonist. Other main characters include Matilda, Harold, Edward the Confessor, and Edith of Wessex. There are brief glimpses of Stigand, and other historical figures of the era. The author was a British soldier and statesman, the novel published posthumously.
- Harold, the Last of the Saxons (1848) by Edward Bulwer-Lytton, 1st Baron Lytton. A historical romance covering the events leading to the Norman conquest of England, from 1052 to 1066. Covers the death of Godwin, Earl of Wessex, the visit of Harold Godwinson to the court of William of Normandy, the Anglo-Welsh Wars, the invasion of Harald Hardrada, the Battle of Stamford Bridge, and the Battle of Hastings. Harold and his family are among the central characters. Also featured are William, Edward the Confessor, Ealdred, Lanfranc, Harald Hardrada, and Gruffydd ap Llywelyn. The author strived to accurately depict English life in the 11th century.
- A Northumbrian in Arms (1909) by George Surrey. Covers conflicts in Northumbria and Wales during the 1050s. The main events are the war of Siward, Earl of Northumbria against Macbeth, King of Scotland, the rise of Malcolm III Canmore to the throne, and the war of Gruffydd ap Llywelyn against Harold Godwinson. The last chapter jumps forward to the Norman invasion under William I. Hereward the Wake is part of the cast of characters.
- Wulf the Saxon: a story of the Norman Conquest (1895) by G. A. Henty. Covers the events leading up to the Norman Conquest, from 1063 to 1066. Harold and William are both prominently featured, with Edward the Confessor also depicted.
- The Andreds-weald; or The House of Michelham: a Tale of the Norman Conquest (1878) by Augustine David Crake. Covers events from 1065 to the death of William I in 1087. Covering the brief reign of Harold, and the entire reign of William. The main events take place in the vicinity of Anderitum, close to modern Pevensey.
- The Sword and the Cowl (1909) by Edgar Swan. Covers the Anglo-Saxon resistance from 1066 to 1071. William and his army are facing a series of opponents. Main events include the siege of Exeter (1068) while the city was held by Gytha Thorkelsdóttir, the suppressed revolt of Morcar, Earl of Northumbria and Edwin, Earl of Mercia (1068), the fall of York to Edgar the Ætheling, Waltheof, Earl of Northumbria, and Sweyn II of Denmark (1069), the submission of Waltheof to William (1070), and the failed revolt of Hereward the Wake on the Isle of Ely (1070-1071).
- The Rival Heirs: being the Third and Last Chronicle of Æscendure (1882) by A. D. Crake. Begins in the aftermath of the Battle of Stamford Bridge, and briefly covers the Battle of Hastings. Mostly focusing on the relations between the conquered Anglo-Saxons and conquering Normans in the early years of the conquest and its immediate aftermath. William I and Lanfranc are prominently featured. The last chapters move the story forward to the First Crusade and the Siege of Jerusalem (1099).
- Hereward the Wake: Last of the English (1866) by Charles Kingsley. Loose and imaginative adaptation of historical events, written in the style of a Norse saga, featuring the brilliant exploits of outlaw Hereward the Wake at home and abroad (mostly Ireland) and Flanders). The "fierce, passionate" protagonist is depicted as a Viking, and at times as a berserker. The last chapters covered the failed revolt of 1070–1071. William I and Morcar are prominently featured.
- The Siege of Norwich Castle: a Story of the Last Struggle against the Conqueror (1892), by Matilda Maria Blake. Covers the Revolt of the Earls and the siege of Norwich Castle in 1075. Depicts the combined revolt by Ralph de Gael, Earl of Norfolk, Roger de Breteuil, 2nd Earl of Hereford, Waltheof, Earl of Northumbria as an attempt to conquer England. Their plan being splitting the realm in three kingdoms: Wessex, Mercia, and Northumbria. William I is depicted alongside Lanfranc, Odo, Earl of Kent, and other members of his court.
- The Conqueror (1931) by Georgette Heyer. Covers the life of William I from his birth c. 1028 to 1066.
- The Golden Warrior by Hope Muntz (1949). Novel contrasting the lives of William and Harold Godwinson.
- The Conqueror's Wife (1957) by Noel Gerson. Novel focusing on William's relationship with his spouse Matilda.
- Man With A Sword (1962) by Henry Treece is a novel for young adults about the struggle between the rebel Hereward the Wake and William.
- This January Tale (1966) by Bryher, takes William as its focus.
- The Paladin (1972) by George Shipway. This novel serves as the first part of the story of Walter Tirel, assassin of William II of England. The tale is then continued in "Wolf Time". The novels takes place in Normandy and features the ageing William the Conqueror's battles with rebellious Norman vassals led by his estranged son, Robert Curthose; also the king's death and the struggle between his three sons for domination of England and Normandy. Prominently features Robert Curthose, William II, and Henry I of England.
- The Norman trilogy by Valerie Anand. Includes the novels Gildenford (1977), The Norman Pretender (1980), The Disputed Crown (1982). Covers the Norman conquest of England, with William I as a major character.
- William the Conqueror (1983) by John Wingate. Biographical novel.
- The novels Sherwood (1991) and Robin and the King (1993) by Parke Godwin depict Robin Hood in conflict with William the Conqueror.
- William appears in the Wallace & Gromit comic The Lost Slipper.
- Fortune's Knave: the Making of William the Conqueror (1992) by Mary Lomer. This novel was also published in a different edition under one of Lomer's pseudonyms, Mary Lide. Covers the formatting years of William.
- Rite of Conquest (2003) by Judith Tarr, is a fantasy novel which depicts a heroic William who also practices magic.
- The Hereward series of novels by James Wilde, (beginning with Hereward (2011)), depict a conflict between William and Hereward the Wake.
- Crusade (2012) by Stewart Binns. Depicts the older William the Conqueror years after the Norman conquest of England in 1066.
- After Hastings (2020) by Steven H. Silver. An alternate history novel where William is defeated by Harold at Hastings.

== In video games ==
William I is a playable character in a few historical scenario settings.

William de Normandie is a playable character in all three instalments of the Crusader Kings franchise. In Crusader Kings, William is only playable when he has already become the King of England. However, in Crusader Kings II and Crusader Kings III, William's (and Harald's) invasion of England can be played out by both the player and the AI. In this scenario, William begins as the Duke of Normandy and vassal of the King of France, at war with England and controlling a large number of special event troops.

In Age of Empires II: The Conquerors, the Battle of Hastings (Battles of the Conquerors) depicts list for an invasion by warship and the Norman knight, bowman, and ax man-in arm on Anglo-Saxons homeland as well Norwegians King Harald Hardraade's defeat at the Battle of Stamford Bridge.

In the 2001 real-time strategy game Empire Earth, some of the early stages of the England campaign portray him from civil war between remaining Norman loyal forces (with support of the French king, who would later turn on William until his reign ended on 4 August 1060) led by the future Duke of Normandy and several rebel Norman barons, led by rebel leader Guy of Brionn in the Battle of Val-ès-Dunes to the future King of England landing in the southern-west part of British Isles.

There is a tutorial campaign about Duke William and his lord-general, a prepared mission for the group of crusaders to conquer the native people of England in Medieval II: Total War, a game of turn-based strategic rounds and real-time tactically oriented battles.

== Sources ==
- Baker, Ernest Albert (1914), A Guide to Historical Fiction, George Routledge and sons
- Nield, Jonathan (1925), A Guide to the Best Historical Novels and Tales, G. P. Putnam's sons, ISBN 0833725092
