= Alien Grounds =

2016 French short film

- Release date: 2016
- Country: France

Alien Grounds is a 2016 short film based on the music of the French rock group Mars Red Sky.

== Background ==
Alien Grounds is a short film written and directed by French film director Sebastien Antoine set to music from the Apex III album of the rock group Mars Red Sky.

The film features actors Yan Tual, Victoria Cyr and Dan Bronchinson. The scenario takes place during the retro 1970s with an outer space theme set to the hypnotic music of Mars Red Sky.

== Plot ==
The film begins with the main character Jack who is lost while driving and phones the mysterious Rebecca at her film-noir style bureau. As Jack describes a vision about a cosmonaut on a strange planet, his car nearly has a head-on collision. Much to his surprise, it is actually a spaceship that has landed on the road. A man in a spacesuit approaches Jack, and the encounter turns into something more than Jack ever imagined.

== Cast ==
- Dan Bronchinson - Cosmonaut
- Yan Tual - Jack
- Victor Cyr - Rebecca
- Grégory Dreyfus - Cult Leader
- Jean-Claude Tisserand - Doorkeeper
