= Monkey3 =

Swiss rock band

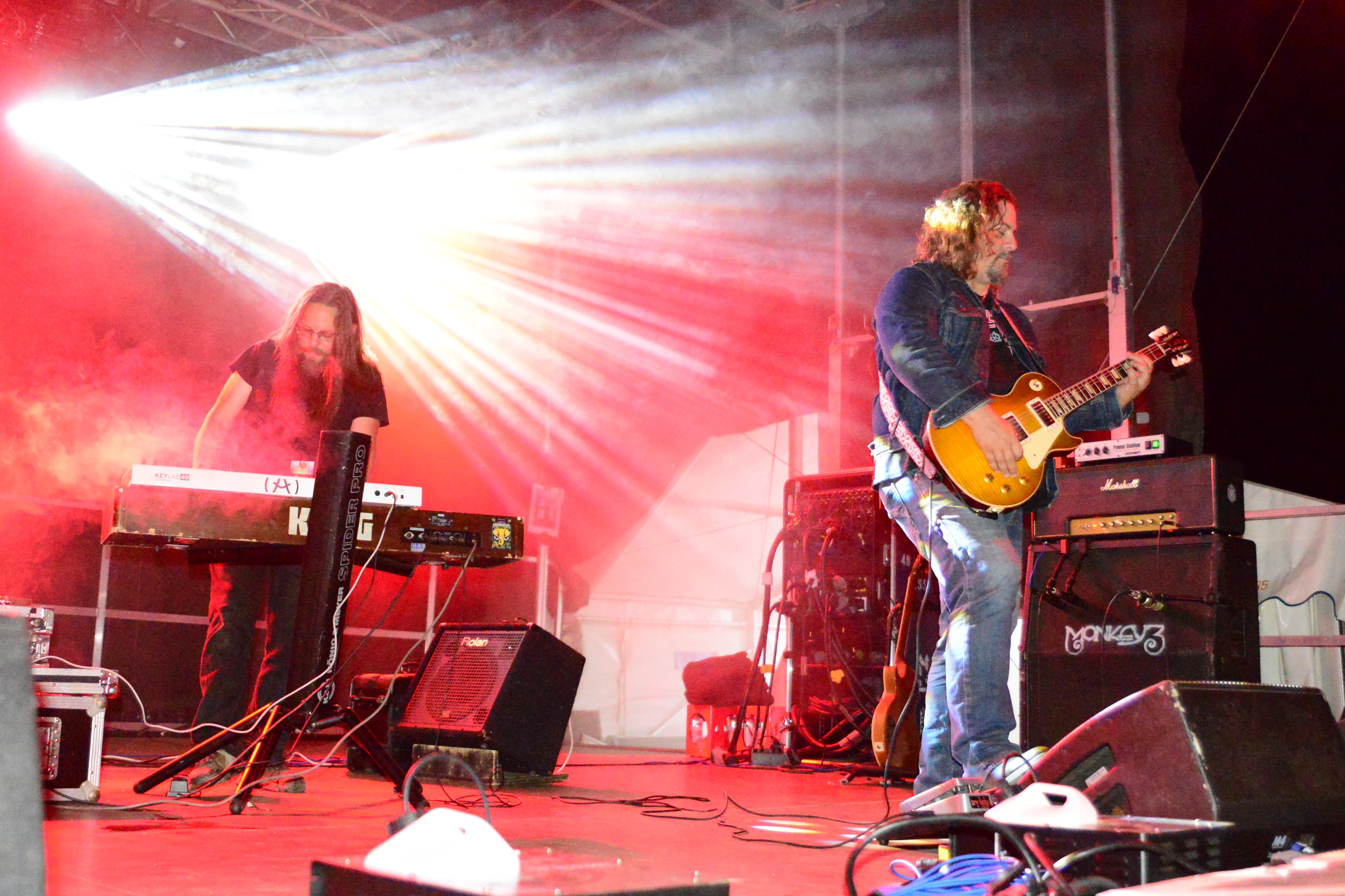
- Monkey3 performing in Breitenbach am Herzberg, Hesse, Germany, (2022).

Background information
- Origin: Lausanne, Vaud, Switzerland
- Years active: 2001–present
- Labels: Buzzville, Stickman, Spinning Goblin, Napalm
- Members: Jalil; Walter; Boris dB
- Past members: Picasso; Kevin
- Website: www.monkey3official.com

Monkey3 is an instrumental rock band from Lausanne, Switzerland.

== History ==
Monkey3 started as a jam band community in Lausanne during the year 2001. The core band was formed by Picasso (bass), Walter (drums) and Boris (guitar). The trio recorded the group's first full-length album "MONKEY3" in 2003. The album was released in 2004 by the Belgian label Buzzville Records.

In 2005 dB (keys and sounds) joins the band as a permanent fourth member and in 2006 Monkey3 released its second album "39Laps" (Buzzville Records, 2006), followed by the EP "Undercover" (2009), the DVD rendition of Monkey3's show at the iconic Rock Oz'Arènes Festival "Live at Aventicum" (2009) and "Beyond the Black Sky" (Stickman Records, 2011).

In 2013 Monkey3 signed with Napalm Records and released The5thSun. Founding member Picasso departed in 2014 and Kevin joined the band on bass duties. With this new line-up, Monkey3 released three albums: Astra Symmetry (Napalm Records, 2016), Live At Freak Valley (Napalm Records, 2017) and Sphere (Napalm Records, 2019).

In 2021, Kevin left and was replaced on bass by Jalil.

In October 2025, Monkey3 collaborated with the French trio Mars Red Sky as 'Monkeys on Mars' to release their first EP 'Monkeys on Mars', a heavy psychedelic outer-space project.

== Members ==
Current

- Walter - Drums (2001–present)
- Jalil - Bass (2021–present)
- Boris - Guitar (2001–present)
- dB- Keys and Sounds (2004–present)

Past

- Picasso - Bass (2001–2014)
- Kevin - Bass (2014–2021)

== Discography ==
- Monkey3 (March 2003)
- 39 Laps (November 2006)
- Split Monkey3 / Hypnos69 - EP (2007)
- Undercover - EP (October 2009)
- Beyond the Black Sky (May 2011)
- The 5th Sun (October 2013)
- Astrasymmetry (September 2016) GER #93, SWI #61
- Live At Freak Valley - Live Album (June 2017)
- Sphere (April 2019) GER #88
- Welcome to the Machine (February 2024)

== EP ==
- Monkeys on Mars - collaboration with Mars Red Sky (October 2025)

== Videography ==
- Live At Aventicum (2009, DVD)
- "Birth of Venus" (2013, music video)
- "Moon" (2016, music video)
- "Mass" (feat. Bumblefoot) (2019, art video)
- "Prism" (2019, art video)
- "Ellipsis" (2019, art video)
- "Ida" (2019, art video)
- "Axis" (2019, art video)
- "Spiral" (2019, art video)
