= Nightstalker (band) =

Greek stoner metal band

Background information
- Origin: Athens, Greece
- Genre: Stoner metal
- Years active: 1989–present
- Labels: Hitch Hyke, FM, Vinylust, Mad Prophet, Nasoni, MeteorCity, Small Stone, Heavy Psych Sounds Records
- Members: Argy Galiatsatos; Andreas Lagios; Tolis Motsios; Dinos Roulos; Fotis Mitropoulos
- Website: nightstalkerband.com

Nightstalker is a Greek stoner metal band from Athens.

== History ==
Nightstalker are Argy (vocals), Andreas Lagios (bass), Tolis Motsios (guitar) and Dinos Roulos (drums). Formed in 1989 by the lead singer and drummer at the same time, Argy, Nightstalker have become popular in the underground rock scene as pioneers of stoner rock and have earned a cult following.

Having a classic rock and metal background, and influenced by the grunge rock of the early 1990s, the band managed to combine the raw rock 'n roll simplicity with heavy riffs and hazy, psychedelic tunes. After some releases in several compilations (Toxic Babes in a Rock 'n Roll Land, Divin'), the band became well known after the release of the first EP, SideFX (1994), and the first album Use (1996). Followed by the third release, the EP The Ritual (2000), the main characteristic of the first decade was the combination of drums playing and lead singing by Argy, and the productions of the albums by Alex K (The Last Drive). The next album, Just a Burn (2004), was the last that Argy played the drums, although the band had a drummer (Costas, a.k.a. Digital Alchemist) for the live shows. This album was a big opportunity to grow the bands' fan base, and its success was a big step for their next album Superfreak (2009) which was released by the American label MeteorCity.

The band itself usually rejects the "stoner rock" label.

We never accepted labels in music. I've always believed we play rock. In the early 1990s music press labeled us as grunge. Three or four years now they've been saying we play stoner. In five or six years, if we're still on this planet, they'll say we play something else. But who gives a shit…

They have played live both in Greece and have toured Europe and appeared in various festivals, while supporting bands such as The Last Drive, Deus ex Machina and Uriah Heep. In 2016, a tribute album saw the light under the "Children Of The Grave" name with bands like Tonia, Heritage or Demolition Train playing their tunes.

The most recent of Nightstalker's 3-decade career has seen the band become more prolific, with the release of albums Dead Rock Commandos in 2012, As Above, So Below in 2016, Great Hallucinations in 2019 and, most recently, Return from the Point of No Return in 2025.

== Discography ==
- SideFx (1994)
- Use (1996)
- The Ritual (2000)
- Just a Burn (2004)
- Superfreak (2009)
- Dead Rock Commandos (2012)
- As Above, So Below (2016)
- Great Hallucinations (2019)
- Return from the Point of No Return (2025)

== Sources ==
- "Archived copy". Archived from the original on 5 November 2016.
- "Nightstalker: Short Biography". [Official Site]. Archived from the original on 5 August 2007.
- "Συνέντευξη με τους Nightstalker" (in Greek). [Rocking.gr]. 10 January 2006.
