= Abdullah (band) =

- Origin: Cleveland, Ohio
- Genres: Stoner/Doom Metal
- Years active: 1998–2009
- Label: MeteorCity
- Past members: Jeff Shirilla; Steven Bateman; Alan Seibert

Abdullah was a metal band formed in 1998 by Jeff Shirilla (drums/vocals) who was quickly joined by Al Seibert on guitar, the group released the EP Snake Lore in 1999 on their own label, Rage of Achilles Records, followed soon after by their self-titled album through MeteorCity Records in 2000.

Abdullah played their last show together on January 17, 2009 after announcing that they would be going on extended hiatus to allow Jeff Shirilla to concentrate on a new project This is Antarctica.

== Band members ==
Former

- Jeff Shirilla – lead vocals, drums
- Al Seibert – guitar
- Steven Bateman
- John Stepp
- Aaron Dallison
- Ed Emilich
- Ed Stephens
- Jameson Walters
- Jim Simonian
- Kevin Latchaw
- Josh Adkins

== Discography ==
- Snake Lore EP (1999) – Rage of Achilles
- Abdullah (2000) – Meteor City
- Graveyard Poetry (2002) – Meteor City
- Abdullah / Dragonauta split (2005) – Dias de Garage Records
- Worship EP, (2005)
