= Night Horse =

American hard rock band

- Origin: Los Angeles, California, U.S.
- Genres: Hard rock
- Years active: 2008–present
- Labels: Tee Pee Records
- Members: Sam James Velde; Justin Anthony Maranga; Gregory Hill Buensuceso; Nicholas Lee D'Itri; Jamie Miller
- Past members: Brandon James Pierce

Night Horse is an American hard rock band based in Los Angeles.

== Biography ==
Night Horse began in late January 2008. Their early work was under the moniker The Mother Fucking Razorbacks, a name that Lemmy Kilmister of Motörhead coined after meeting them in front of Hollywood's Hustler store. The band had come together to play straight forward rock 'n' roll music. Vocalist Sam Velde was recommended to the group, who were actively seeking a front man. After having disbanded his former band Bluebird and spent the past few years developing his eclectic record label Cold Sweat Records, Sam was eager to rejoin the ranks of the rockers.

Soon after the lineup was set the band changed their name. With the idea of music being a thing of the night, and a 'swift kick and a gallop' to the heart brought the name Night Horse. Songs were written, performed live, and recorded, all over the short course of a few months. The band's song "Come Down Halo" is featured in the soundtrack of the video game "MLB 10: The Show".

=== Influences ===
The five-piece initially bonded over a common love of bands like the Alice Cooper Group, early Aerosmith, Van Halen, Sir Lord Baltimore and ZZ Top. Over time the group developed a sound equally informed by such bands as The Allman Brothers Band, Peter Green's Fleetwood Mac, Thin Lizzy, Cactus, early blues-rock like Freddie King, Muddy Waters, Willie Dixon, and more modern rock bands like Soundgarden.

== Band members ==
- Sam James Velde – vocals
- Justin Anthony Maranga – lead guitar, slide guitar, backing vocals
- Gregory Hill Buensuceso – rhythm guitar
- Nicholas Lee D'Itri – bass
- Jamie Miller – drums

== Discography ==
=== Studio albums ===
- The Dark Won't Hide You (2008) (Tee Pee Records)
- Perdition Hymns (2010) (Tee Pee Records)

=== Singles ===
- Night Horse / Dirty Sweet split 7-inch (2009) (Tee Pee Records)
- Night Horse / The High Saints split 7-inch (2009) (Tee Pee Records)
- Night Horse / Sea of Air split 7-inch (2009) (Tee Pee Records)
