= Dreamwheel =

EP by Spirit Caravan
- Released: 1999
- Genre: Doom metal
- Label: MeteorCity Records/People Like You Records

Spirit Caravan chronology
Jug Fulla Sun (1999)	Dreamwheel (1999)	Elusive Truth (2001)

Professional ratings
Review scores
Source	Rating
AllMusic	3.5/5 stars

Dreamwheel is an EP by Spirit Caravan. It was released in 1999 on CD by MeteorCity Records and on 10" vinyl by People Like You Records. This was released shortly after their debut album, Jug Fulla Sun.

== Track listing ==
1. "Dreamwheel" - 6:15
2. "Burnin' In" - 3:35
3. "Re-Alignment/High Power" - 2:28
4. "Sun Stoned" - 3:39
5. "C, Yourself" - 3:49
