= Spirit Caravan =

American doom metal / stoner rock band

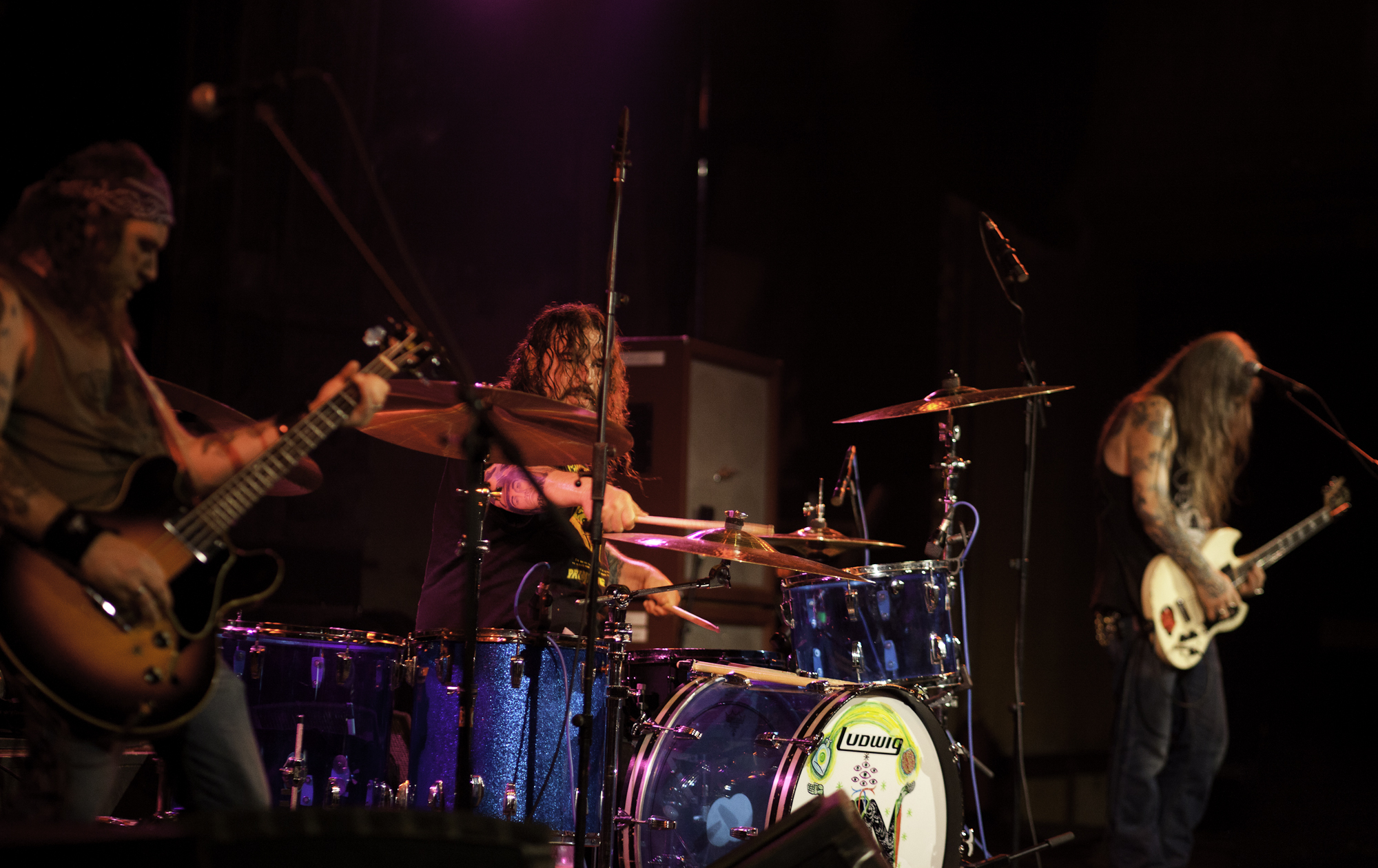
- Spirit Caravan performing in 2014

Background information
- Origin: Potomac, Maryland, U.S.
- Genres: Doom metal, stoner rock
- Years active: 1996–2002, 2014–2016
- Labels: Tolotta, Tee Pee, MeteorCity
- Past members: Scott Weinrich; Dave Sherman; Ed Gulli; Gary Isom; Henry Vasquez

Spirit Caravan was an American doom metal / stoner rock band featuring guitarist and vocalist Scott "Wino" Weinrich.

== Biography ==
Scott "Wino" Weinrich formed Spirit Caravan after the breakup of The Obsessed. The remainder of the band consisted of Dave Sherman (formerly of Wretched) on bass and vocals; and Gary Isom (formerly of Unorthodox) on drums. Weinrich credits them for encouraging him to join the band and become active musically again, after he had abandoned his music career. The band was originally entitled Shine, and they released a demo and 7" under this name. They were forced to change to the band's name when another band of the same name threatened legal action. They changed their name to Spirit Caravan, after an Obsessed song. The band had a lyrical emphasis on spirituality (though not necessarily religion) and global politics. The band split up in 2002 but have reunited for US tour dates and European festival appearances in 2014.

After the band's demise, Weinrich joined Place of Skulls and founded The Hidden Hand. After The Hidden Hand's demise in 2007, Weinrich rejoined the reactivated Saint Vitus. Sherman went on to found the band Earthride. Isom joined Internal Void, Pentagram, Valkyrie and Nitroseed.

Their song "Dove-Tongued Aggressor" was featured on the soundtrack for the 2005 video game Tony Hawk's American Wasteland.

Numerous songs by Spirit Caravan were also recorded as songs for The Obsessed. "Kill Ugly Naked" from Jug Fulla Sun appears on various demos and live recordings along with the "Incarnate" compilation. "Fear's Machine" from Jug Fulla Sun was originally written for the Obsessed and appears on the "Incarnate" compilation. "Melancholy Grey" from Jug Fulla Sun was written in the same sessions as 1994's "The Church Within" and appears on the 2013 reissue of that album. "Higher Power" from Dreamwheel appears on the Obsessed's 1982 demo. "Spirit Caravan" from Elusive Truth appears on "Incarnate". "Lifer City" from Elusive Truth appears on various demos and the unreleased Obsessed LP sent to Metal Blade.

Former Obsessed drummer Ed Gulli joined Spirit Caravan on drums for the Maryland Doom Fest in June 2015. He was replaced in 2016 by drummer Brian Costantino.

Wino announced in 2016 that Spirit Caravan would become the new lineup of The Obsessed.

== Members ==
- Scott "Wino" Weinrich – guitar and vocals (1996–2002, 2014–present)
- Brian Costantino – drums (2016–present)

=== Former members ===
- Gary Isom – drums (1996–2002)
- Ed Gulli – drums (2015)
- Dave Sherman - bass and vocals (1996–2002, 2014–2022); died 2022

=== Live musicians ===
- Henry Vasquez from Blood of the Sun and Saint Vitus – drums (2014)

== Discography ==
=== Albums ===
- Jug Fulla Sun CD (1999 Tolotta Records)
- Elusive Truth CD/LP (2001 Tolotta Records)

=== EPs ===
- "Lost Sun Dance" 7" (as Shine) (1998 Tolotta Records)
- Dreamwheel CDEP/10"EP (1999 MeteorCity Records)
- "Darkness and Longing" 7" split with Sixty Watt Shaman (1999 Tee Pee Records)
- "So Mortal Be" 7" (2002 Tolotta Records)

=== Compilations ===
- The Last Embrace 2xCD/2xLP (2004 MeteorCity Records)

=== Compilation appearances ===
- "Lost Sun Dance" (as Shine) on Stoned Revolution – The Ultimate Trip CD/2LP (1998 Drunken Maria Records)
- "Powertime" (as Shine) on Metal Injection CD (1998 Bad Posture Records)
- "The Departure" on Rise 13 CD (1999 Rise Above Records)
- "Wicked World" on Sucking the 70's 2CD (2002 Small Stone Records)
- "Dove-Tongued Aggressor", "No Hope Goat Farm", and "Re-Alignment/Higher Power" on ...And Back to Earth Again 3CD (2007 MeteorCity Records)
