= MeteorCity =

American record label

- Founded: 1997
- Founder: Jadd Shickler; Aaron Emmel
- Status: Active
- Genre: Stoner rock, doom metal, sludge metal, drone metal, psychedelic rock
- Country of origin: United States
- Official website: meteorcity.com

MeteorCity Records is an American record label founded in 1997 by Jadd Shickler and Aaron Emmel in Albuquerque, New Mexico. With the release of its compilation album Welcome to MeteorCity showcasing young unsigned Kyuss-like bands, MeteorCity helped launch the stoner rock genre and many of the genre's first bands, plus side projects from members of well-known bands including The Atomic Bitchwax and Hermano. MeteorCity Records was one of the first record labels dedicated exclusively to Stoner rock, doom metal, sludge metal, drone metal and psychedelic rock.

== History ==
MeteorCity was founded in September 1997 by Jadd Shickler (of band Spiritu) and Aaron Emmel in Albuquerque, New Mexico. The first incarnation was an online store called All That's Heavy, which sold hard-to-find releases by stoner rock bands Kyuss, Monster Magnet, and Fu Manchu. They soon expanded the catalog to include artists that stylistically fit with the first three bands.

After running the online store for about half a year, they were contacted by the former proprietor for the first Kyuss fan website. He recommended MeteorCity do a compilation of unsigned bands that Kyuss fans would enjoy. MeteorCity Records was formed, and the result of the suggestion was the compilation Welcome to MeteorCity, which was released in May of that year. The compilation included both established desert and stoner rock acts, including new bands established by John Garcia of Kyuss (now in Unida), Ed Mundell of Monster Magnet, and Pete Stahl. The album was the first time that the bands Sixty Watt Shaman, Lowrider, The Atomic Bitchwax, Dozer, Goatsnake, Drag Pack, and Los Natas were heard on a record. According to MeteorCity founders,

"When this was happening, there wasn't really a [stoner rock] scene yet, there were just a lot of people around the world who were still sad about the end of Kyuss, as well as the end of Slo Burn, and who listened to stuff like Monster Magnet and Fu Manchu but wanted more. The label took off when we appeared with Welcome To Meteor City, as though the world was waiting for someone to do what we were doing."

Around this time a MeteorCity intern purportedly coined the term desert rock to describe the burgeoning genre, which is still used interchangeably with the more known descriptor "stoner rock". Stoner rock originates from the title of the 1997 Roadrunner Records compilation Burn One Up! Music for Stoners.

After the first compilation was released, that summer the label received a call from customer Henry Vasquez, who had the members of the band Nebula in his store. The bandmembers, which included founding Fu Manchu members Eddie Glass (guitar) and Ruben Romano (drums), had asked to talk with them. The band agreed to release their EP on MeteorCity, and MeteorCity offered to fund the band's recording session with Jack Endino. The result was MeteorCity's second release, the Nebula/Lowrider EP, which also featured tracks by Swedish band Lowrider. In 1999, the label released Unida/Dozer, a joint EP featuring the first non-compilation tracks by Unida and Swedish band Dozer.

The label soon signed a number of musicians and bands from the Palm Desert Scene of desert rock, such as Hermano and Unida, both featuring former Kyuss frontman John Garcia. They have also released albums by The Atomic Bitchwax, which features Monster Magnet guitarist Ed Mundell, and The Hidden Hand and Spirit Caravan led by Obsessed/St. Vitus guitarist Scott "Wino" Weinreich. In 2002 they released the first album by the Orquesta Del Desierto, which featured key members of the major desert rock bands.

=== Change of ownership ===
As the scene continued to develop, the popular website StonerRock.com was launched by Dan Beland in 1999. The website became a central community hub for heavy music artists and fans. In March 2001, MeteorCity licensed StonerRock.com to take over management and operations of All That's Heavy. All That's Heavy's catalog grew to become the largest online store of stoner rock, doom metal, sludge metal, drone metal and psychedelic rock. MeteorCity in turn began to focus more on the label. All That's Heavy was officially sold to Dan Beland and Melanie Streko of StonerRock.com on May 15, 2004, and renamed All That is Heavy.

In 2007, Shickler and Emmel sold MeteorCity Records to Dan Beland and Melanie Streko as well. Their farewell release was a three disc compilation disc titled ...And Back to Earth Again. MeteorCity continued to release albums by new bands, including full LPs from Black Pyramid, Elder, Snail and Freedom Hawk, among others. In 2010 StonerRock.com was taken offline, and MeteorCity Records became the official label for All That is Heavy. On September 1, 2014, Melanie Streko resigned from All That is Heavy and MeteorCity Records. Three years later, on August 1, 2017, All That is Heavy was sold to Casey and Taylor Kelch of Katy, Texas.

== Artists ==
- Abdullah
- Ararat
- The Atomic Bitchwax
- Black NASA
- Blind Dog
- Black Pyramid
- Dead Man
- Dozer
- Egypt
- Eighteen Wheels Burning
- Elder
- Eternal Elysium
- Farflung
- Flood
- Freedom Hawk
- Gallery of Mites
- Hermano
- The Hidden Hand
- Humo Del Cairo
- Leeches of Lore
- Let the Night Roar
- Los Natas
- Lowrider
- Misdemeanor
- The Mushroom River Band
- Nebula
- New Keepers of The Water Towers
- Nightstalker
- The Obsessed
- Olde Growth
- Orquesta del Desierto
- The Quill
- The Ribeye Brothers
- SardoniS
- Scene Killer
- Snail
- Solace
- Solarized
- Spirit Caravan
- Spiritu
- Truckfighters
- Unida
- Valkyrie
- Village of Dead Roads
- WhiteBuzz

== Release history ==
Year	No.	Artist	Title
1998	MCY-001	Various (Sixty Watt Shaman, Sparzanza, Fatso Jetson, The Atomic Bitchwax, Rotors to Rust, Demoncleaner, Goatsnake, Drag Pack, Lowrider, Roadsaw, Sheavy, Dozer, Los Natas, JM.J, Core, Celestial Season, etc.)	Welcome to MeteorCity
1998	FMC-001	Solace, Solarized	Jersey Devils Double EP
1998	MCY-002; MCY-004	Nebula, Lowrider	Nebula/Lowrider
1999	MCY-003; MCY-005	Unida, Dozer	Unida/Dozer
1999	MCY-006	Five Wheel Drive	Misdemeanor
1999	MCY-007	Spirit Caravan	Dreamwheel
2000	MCY-008	The Quill	The Quill
2000	MCY-009	Various (Electric Frankenstein, Solace, Sebastian Bach, Zébulon, Iron Savior, Las Cruces, Eternal Elysium, The Quill, Blind Dog, etc.)	Slave to the Power – The Iron Maiden Tribute
2000	MCY-010	Solace	Further
2000	MCY-011	Eternal Elysium	Spiritualized D
2000	MCY-012	Lowrider	Ode to Io
2000	MCY-013	The Mushroom River Band	Music for the World Beyond
2000	MCY-014	Abdullah	Abdullah
2000	MCY-015	Blind Dog	The Last Adventures of Captain Dog
2001	MCY-016	Various (Lowrider, Eternal Elysium, Sheavy, The Awesome Machine, etc.)	I Am Vengeance Soundtrack
2001	MCY-017	Scene Killer (Members of The Atomic Bitchwax, Burnout King, Core, Daisycutter, Drag Pack)	Scene Killer
2001	MCY-018	Solarized	Driven
2002	MCY-019	Eternal Elysium	Share
2002	MCY-020	The Atomic Bitchwax	Spit Blood
2002	MCY-021	The Ribeye Brothers	If I Had a Horse
2002	MCY-022	Orquesta Del Desierto	Orquesta Del Desierto
2002	MCY-023	Nebula	Dos EPs
2002	MCY-024	The Mushroom River Band	Simsalabim
2003	MCY-025	Spiritu	Spiritu
2002	MCY-026	Abdullah	Graveyard Poetry
2003	MCY-027	Solace	13
2003	MCY-028	Gallery of Mites	Bugs on the Bluefish
2003	MCY-029	Blind Dog	Captain Dog Rides Again
2004	MCY-030	The Hidden Hand	Divine Propaganda
2003	MCY-031	Spirit Caravan	The Last Embrace
2004	MCY-032	Orquesta del Desierto	Dos
2004	MCY-033	Black NASA	Deuce
2004	MCY-034	The Hidden Hand, Wooly Mammoth	Night Letters
2004	MCY-035	Hermano	Dare I Say...
2005	MCY-036	The Atomic Bitchwax	3
2006	MCY-037	Spiritu / Village of Dead Roads	Human Failures
2006	MCY-038	The Obsessed	Lunar Womb
2006	MCY-039	The Atomic Bitchwax	Boxriff
2007	MCY-040	Various (Solace, The Atomic Bitchwax, Unida, Lowrider, Blind Dog, Dozer, Black NASA, Cosmosquad, Las Cruces, Spiritu, I am Droid, Truckfighters, etc.)	...And Back to Earth Again – Ten Years of MeteorCity
2008	MCY-041	Farflung	A Wound in Eternity
2008	MCY-042	Dead Man	Dead Man
2008	MCY-043	Elder	Elder
2008	MCY-044	Eighteen Wheels Burning	Tweak'd Out, Strung up and Redlined
2009	MCY-045	Nightstalker	Superfreak
2009	MCY-046	Freedom Hawk	Freedom Hawk
2009	MCY-047	Leeches of Lore	Leeches of Lore
2009	MCY-048	New Keepers of the Water Towers	Chronicles
2009	MCY-049	Black Pyramid	Black Pyramid
2009	MCY-050	Snail	Blood
2008	MCY-051	Let the Night Roar	Let the Night Roar
2009	MCY-052	Flood	Native
2010	MCY-053	Valkyrie	Valkyrie
2010	MCY-054	Valkyrie	Man of Two Visions
2009	MCY-055	Ararat	Musica de la Resistencia
2009	MCY-056	Village of Dead Roads	Desolation Will Destroy You
2009	MCY-057	Whitebuzz	Book of Whyte
2009	MCY-058	Egypt	Egypt
2010	MCY-059	Humo Del Cairo	Humo del Cairo
2011	MCY-060	New Keepers of the Water Towers	The Calydonian Hunt
2010	MCY-061	SardoniS	Sardonis
2010	MCY-063	Dozer	In the Tail of a Comet / Madre de Dios
2010	MCY-064	Farflung	Live at Roadburn 2009
2010	MCY-065	Olde Growth	Olde Growth
2010	MCY-666	Various (Crushed Skulls, Flood, Egypt, Whitebuzz, SardoniS, Ararat, Freedom Hawk, Elder, Farflung, Black Pyramid, etc.)	Welcome Back to MeteorCity
2011	MCY-066	Elder	Dead Roots Stirring
2012	MCY-067	Black Pyramid	II
Year	No.	Artist	Title
2005	MCY-999	The Atomic Bitchwax	Atomic Bitchwax I (limited edition with alternate cover art)
2005	MCY-998	Solace	Further (reissue)
2005	MCY-997	Unida, Dozer	Unida/Dozer (reissue)
2005	MCY-996	Truckfighters	Gravity X
2006	MCY-995	Village of Dead Roads	Dwelling in Doubt
2007	MCY-994	Los Natas	El Universo Perdido De Los Natas
2008	MCY-993	The Atomic Bitchwax	Tab 4 (limited edition with alternate cover art)
