= Mars Red Sky =

French rock band

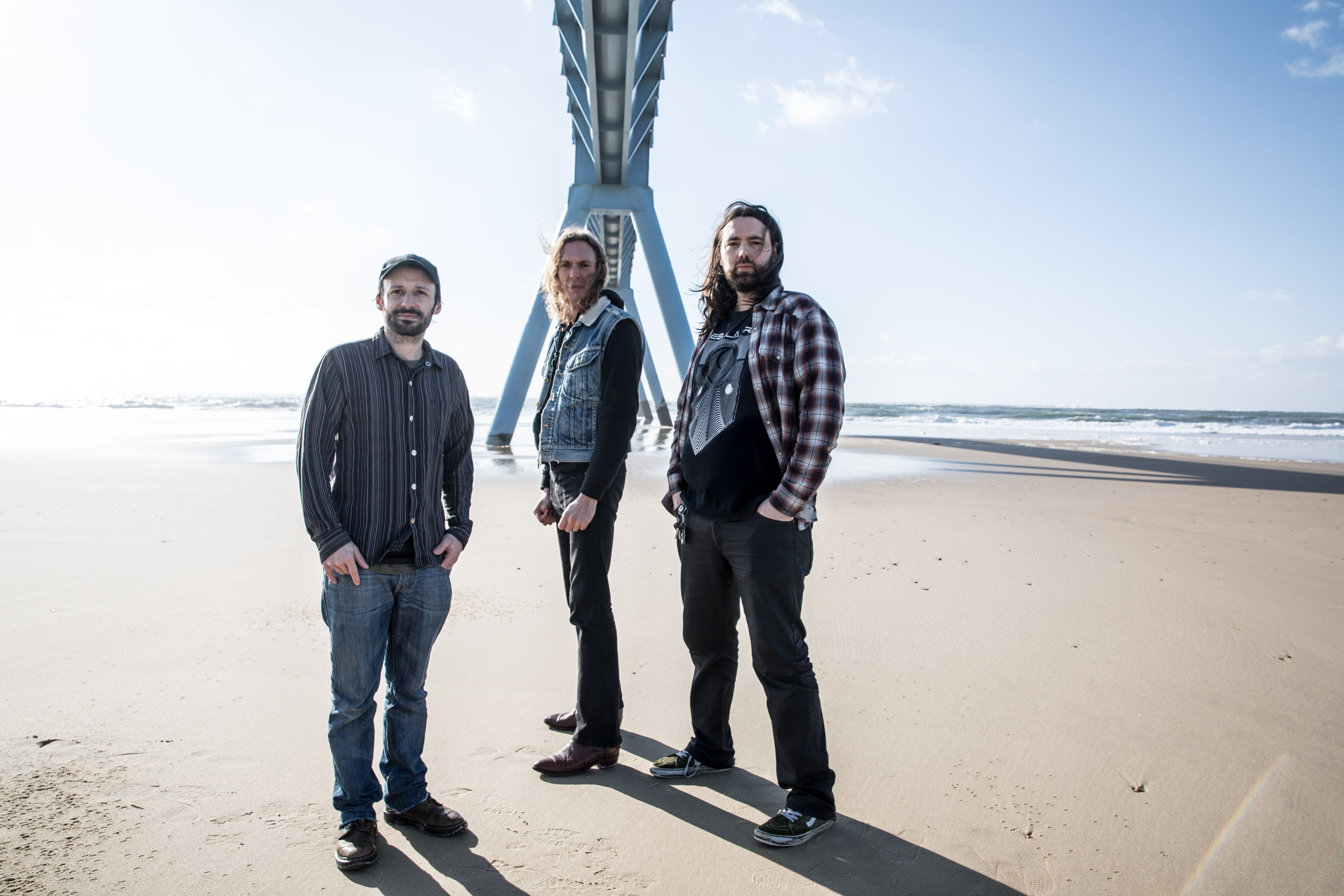
- Mars Red Sky in 2019

Background information
- Origin: Bordeaux, France
- Genres: Stoner rock; rock; psychedelic rock; desert rock
- Years active: 2007–present
- Members: Julien Pras; Jimmy Kinast; Mathieu Gazeau

Mars Red Sky is a stoner rock band from Bordeaux, France. As of 2024, they have released five studio albums and six EPs.

== History ==
Formed in 2007, Mars Red Sky originates in Bordeaux, France, and is made up of Julien Pras (guitar, vocals), Jimmy Kinast (bass, vocals), and Mathieu Gazeau (drums). Their music is a blend of psychedelic and stoner rock.

=== Festivals and tours ===
The band has played at Eurockéennes, Levitation, the Roadburn Festival, and South by Southwest. In 2016, they toured North America.

Alien Grounds (video)

=== Short film ===
In October 2016, Mars Red Sky released the short film Alien Grounds, which included music from their third album, Apex III. Directed by Sebastien Antoine, the film features actors Yan Tual, Victoria Cyr, and Dan Bronchinson.

=== Queen of the Meadow collaboration ===
In 2023, Mars Red Sky collaborated with the band Queen of the Meadow, jointly releasing the EP Mars Red Sky & Queen of the Meadow. The song "Maps of Inferno" was featured on Prog magazine's tracks of the week. The publication described the melding of the "progressive doom" music of Mars Red Sky with the "dark folk singing" of Queen of the Meadow as resulting in a new sound realm not previously explored by the artists.

== Band members ==
Members
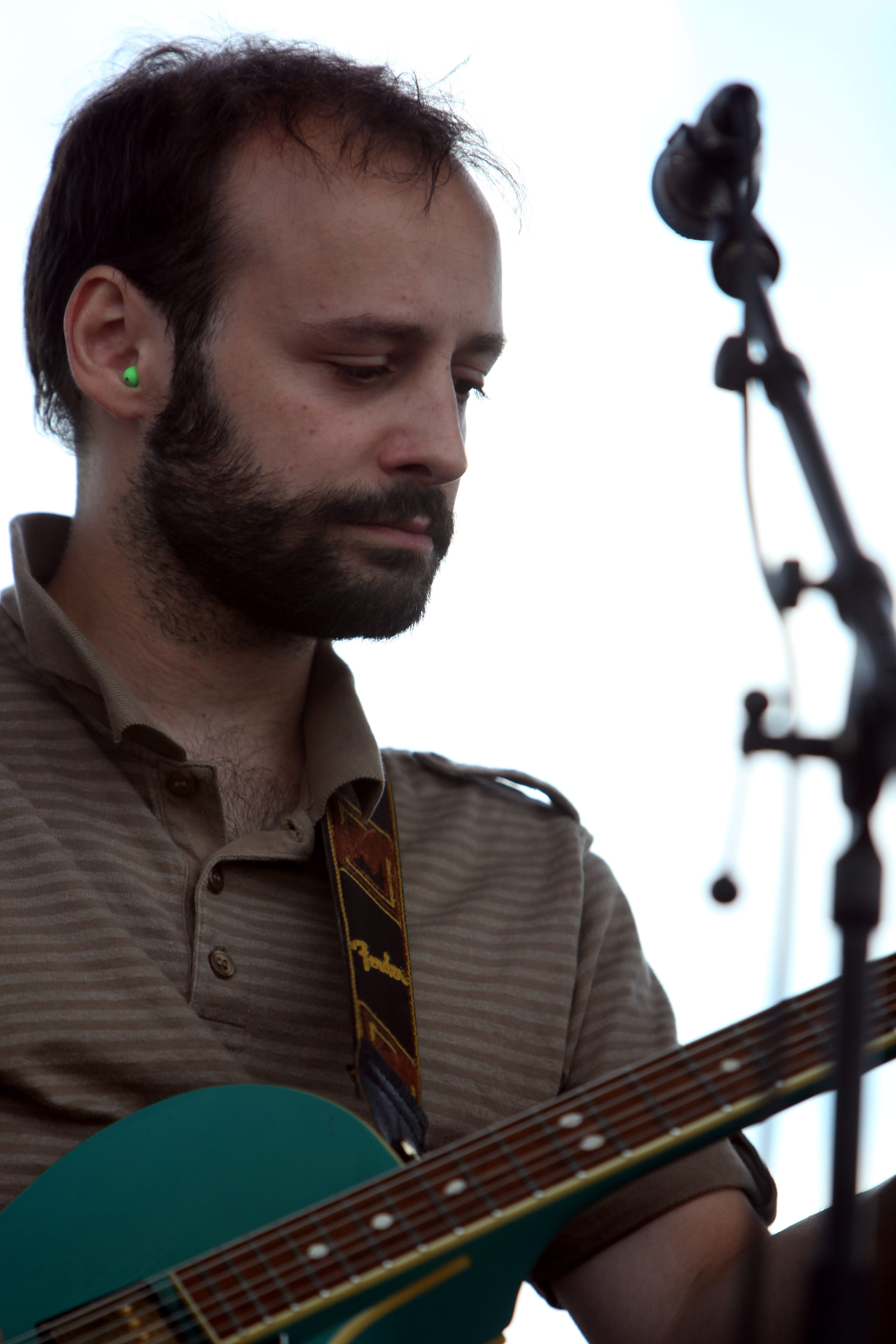
Julien Pras (guitar, vocals)

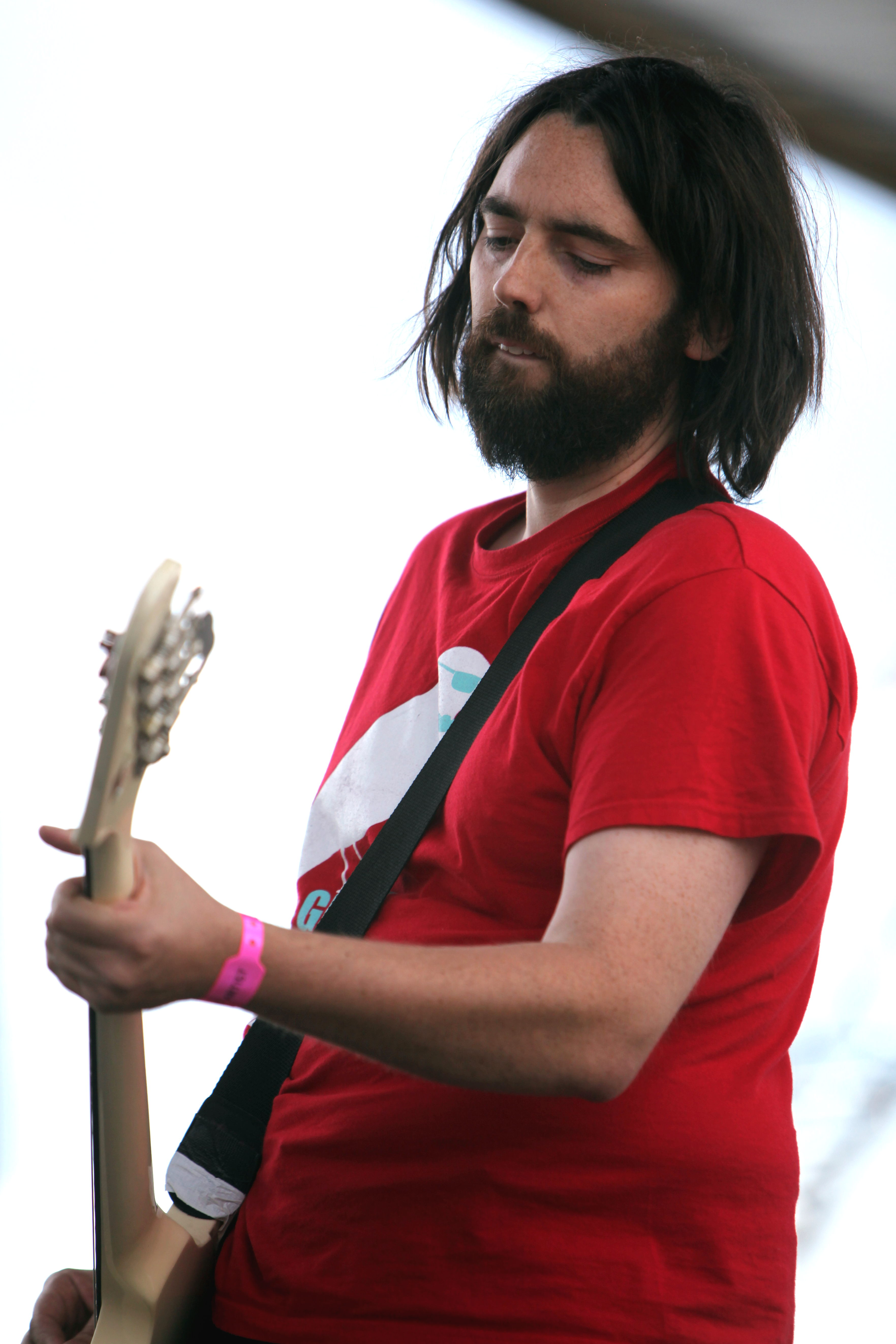
Jimmy Kinast (bass, vocals)

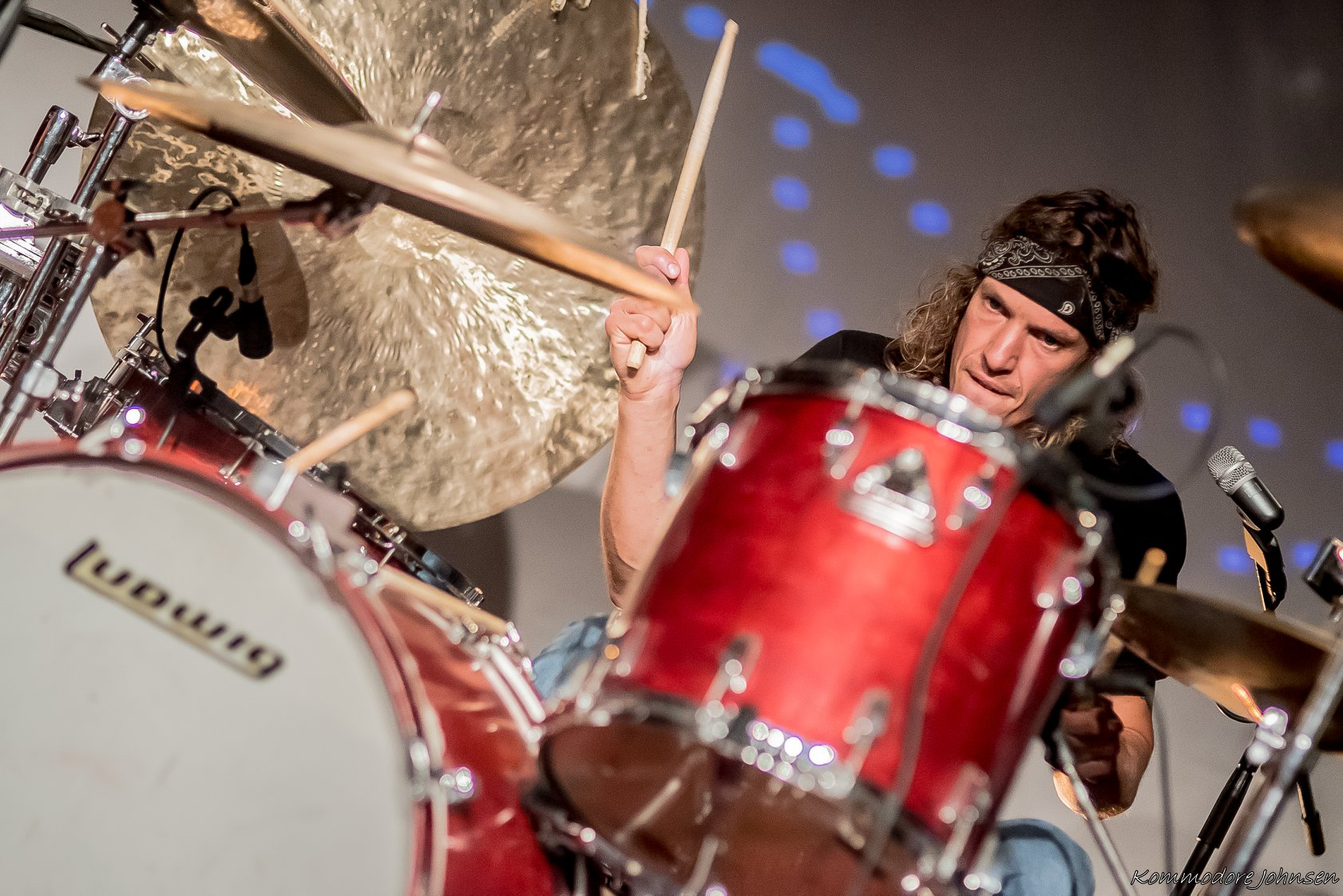
Mathieu Gazeau (drums, vocals)

== Discography ==
=== Studio albums ===
- Mars Red Sky (2011)
- Stranded in Arcadia (2014)
- Apex III (Praise for the Burning Soul) (2016)
- The Task Eternal (2019)
- Dawn of the Dusk (2023)

=== EPs ===
- Curse/Sádaba (2010)
- Green Rune White Totem (split with Year of No Light, 2012)
- Be My Guide (2013)
- Hovering Satellites (2014)
- Myramyd (2017)
- Mars Red Sky & Queen of the Meadow (collaboration with Queen of the Meadow, 2023)
