= William the Conqueror (film) =

2015 French historical film

William the Young Conqueror
- Directed by: Fabien Drugeon
- Written by: Fabien Drugeon
- Release date: 2015
- Country: France
- Language: French

William the Conqueror (French: Guillaume, la jeunesse du conquérant, lit. 'William the Young Conqueror') is a 2015 French historical film directed by Fabien Drugeon.

== Plot ==
The film begins in 1066 as William of Normandy is about to embark from Dives-sur-Mer to conquer England. In the event that he would not return alive, William introduced his son Robert to his loyal barons to receive the ducal throne heritage.

We then have an extensive flashback. William's father Duke Robert declares William his heir before departing for a pilgrimage to Jerusalem. The barons swear loyalty. However, Robert dies on the journey and William, still a child, has to flee.

We then see a long sequence with William as a fugitive. Finally, as a young man, he persuades the King of France to lend him an army. He wins a crucial battle and becomes Duke.

During the 1066 sections of the film, William tells a friend that it is not the weather that is delaying him. At the end, he gets a messenger from Norway. Presumably this tells him that Harald Hardrada is invading England, which will pull Harold Godwinson north and make the conquest much more likely to succeed.

== Cast ==
- Dan Bronchinson as William of Normandy (French: Guillaume de Normandie), later William the Conqueror
- Jean-Damien Détouillon as 20-year old William of Normandy
- Tiésay Deshayes as young William of Normandy
- Geoffroy Lidvan as Osbern the Steward (French: Osbern de Crépon)
- Eric Rulliat as Ranulf the Viscount (French: Renouf de Briquessard)
- Thomas Debaene as William FitzOsbern (French: Wilhelm Fitz Osbern)
- Pierrick Billard as Gilbert, Count of Brionne (French: Gilbert de Brionne)
