= The Mushroom River Band =

Swedish rock band

- Origin: Värnamo, Sweden
- Genres: Stoner rock, heavy metal, hard rock
- Years active: 1996–2004
- Labels: MeteorCity, Century Media, People Like You, Victor Entertainment
- Members: Anders Linusson; Alexander "Saso" Sekulovski; Christian "Spice" Sjöstrand; Chris Rockström; Robert "Bob Ruben" Hansson; Andreas Grafenauer

The Mushroom River Band was a Swedish rock band active from 1996 to 2004. They released two full-length albums and an EP, as well as appearing on a number of compilations. The band also made two European tours in support of each album, playing in countries such as Germany, the Netherlands, United Kingdom, Czech Republic, Switzerland and Belgium.

== Biography ==
The Mushroom River Band was formed by guitarist Anders Linusson, bass player Alexander "Saso" Sekulovski and drummer Andreas Grafenauer in 1996. This line-up recorded one demo tape with Christian "Spice" Sjöstrand from Spiritual Beggars as a guest vocalist. This demo was produced in small numbers and the band broke up as members went in different directions. In 1997, Linusson and Sekulovski decided to reform the band and recruited 16-year-old Chris Rockström on drums. Also, Spice now joined as a full-time singer. In January 1998 the band entered Soundscape Studio in Halmstad to record what would later become the Rocketcrash EP. This EP was released in 1999 on 10" vinyl on the band's own Tea Pot label. Later in 1999 the band recorded a second demo entitled the No Quarter Recordings. These recordings led to the band landing gigs outside their local region, but performing became increasingly difficult as Spice attempted to juggle duties in both The Mushroom River Band and Spiritual Beggars. In 2000 the band signed to MeteorCity and released their first full-length album, Music for the World Beyond, the same year. Following this album the band performed only a few shows, again due to Spice's engagement in Spiritual Beggars. However, in 2001 the band went out on their first European tour in support of the album. Later in the year Spice left Spiritual Beggars to concentrate solely on The Mushroom River Band. The band's second and final album, Simsalabim, was released in 2002. Following the recording of this album Rockström left the band. Robert Hansson was recruited to fill in on drums for the ensuing European tour. After the tour The Mushroom River Band was put on hiatus and the following year Spice left the band. The band decided to break up in 2004.

== Members ==
- Anders Linusson: guitar (1996–2004)
- Alexander "Saso" Sekulovski: bass guitar (1996–2004)
- Christian "Spice" Sjöstrand: vocals (1997–2003)
- Chris Rockström: drums (1997–2002, 2004)
- Robert "Bob Ruben" Hansson: drums (2002–2003)
- Andreas Grafenauer: drums (1996)

== Discography ==
=== Albums ===
- Music for the World Beyond CD (2000 MeteorCity Records)
- Simsalabim CD (2002 MeteorCity Records)

=== EPs ===
- Rocketcrash 10" EP (1999 Tea Pot Records) (ltd 500 copies)

=== 7" ===
"Sincerely Yours" on Tungt Svenskt, 2 x 7" vinyl (2004 Game Two Records) - with Generous Maria, Rise and Shine & Space Probe Taurus

=== Compilation appearances ===
- "Twin Lyrics #1" on Molten Universe Volume 1 (1999 Molten Universe Records)
- "Loser's Blues" on Twisted Sounds from the Swedish Underground (1999 Topsound)
- "Super Insomnia" on Judge Not... (2000 Underdogma Records)
- "Sir B's Tune" on Burned Down to Zero (2000 Daredevil Records & Monsterzero Records)
- "A Sad Story" on Where the Bad Boys Rock (2000 "I Used to Fuck People Like You in Prison" Records)
- "To the World Beyond" on Where the Bad Boys Rock (2001 "I Used to Fuck People Like You in Prison" Records)
- "Bugs" on Hard 'n' Heavy Vol. 46 (2002 Hard 'n' Heavy Series)
- "Walk Away" (James Gang cover) on Sucking the 70's (2002 Small Stone Records)
- "D.D.D." on The Mighty Desert Rock Avengers (2002 "I Used to Fuck People Like You in Prison" Records)
- "Simsalabim" and "29' 2-1/2" (into Thin Air)" on ...And Back to Earth Again (2007 MeteorCity Records)
