= Dan Bronchinson =

French actor and producer

- Born: France
- Occupations: Actor; film producer

Dan Bronchinson is a French actor and producer.

== Biography ==
Bronchinson is the lead actor in and the producer of the film Dealer (fr), directed by Jean Luc Herbulot. The screenplay was inspired by Bronchinson’s life as a former drug dealer. The film premiered at the Fantasia International Film Festival in Canada and opened the Étrange Festival in Paris.

He features as one of the leads in the short film Alien Grounds based on the music of the French rock band Mars Red Sky.

== Filmography ==
- Addiction (2011)
- Routine (2012)
- Dealer (2014)
- Alien Grounds (2016)
