= Core (band) =

American rock band

- Core in 1996. L–R: Carmine Pernini, Finn Ryan, and Tim Ryan

Background information
- Origin: New Jersey, U.S.
- Genres: Stoner rock
- Years active: 1996–1999
- Labels: Atlantic, Tee Pee, MIA
- Members: Finn Ryan; Carmine Pernini; Tim Ryan

Core was an American stoner rock band from New Jersey, active in the late 1990s.

== History ==
Core debuted with their first album, Revival, in 1996 on Atlantic Records. The album was produced by Billy Anderson and supported by tours with Fu Manchu, Clutch and Orange 9mm. Despite this publicity, the album suffered due to limited promotion. The band bounced back in 1999 with their follow up, The Hustle Is On on MIA Records and Tee Pee Records. It features artwork by Arik Roper. The album was supported by a tour entitled "Riff Rock Railroad", which also featured Atomic Bitchwax and Nebula.

In addition to the two albums, Core was also featured on the MeteorCity Records compilation Welcome to Meteor City, an album that showcased numerous Kyuss-like bands and helped establish MeteorCity. They also contributed "Soul Shaker" (a cover of Aerosmith's "Soul Saver") to the Small Stone Records tribute compilation Right in the Nuts.

== Members ==
- Finn Ryan – vocals, guitar
- Carmine Pernini – bass
- Tim Ryan – drums

== Discography ==
=== Studio albums ===
- Revival (1996 Atlantic Records)
- The Hustle Is On (1999 MIA Records/Tee Pee Records)

=== Compilation album appearances ===
- "Rallen" on Kill the Rock Star (1996 TARR Records)
- "Vacuum Lite" on Welcome to Meteor City (1997 MeteorCity Records)
- "Soul Shaker" on Right in the Nuts: A Tribute to Aerosmith (2000 Small Stone Records)
- "Fleetwood" on Guerrilla Jukebox Vol 1 (2003 Tee Pee Records)
