= Sixty Watt Shaman =

American heavy metal band

- Origin: Maryland, U.S.
- Genres: Southern metal, stoner metal
- Years active: 1996–present
- Labels: Game Two, Spitfire, Shaman Box Music, Megalithic Media
- Members: Daniel Soren; Jason Budman; Mike Beggs; Chris Baker
- Past members: Joe Selby; Pete Campbell; Kenny Wagner; Jim Forrester
- Website: sixtywattshaman.com

Sixty Watt Shaman is an American rock band known for incorporating hard rock with blues, southern rock, doom, punk rock and heavy metal influences, originally based out of Towson, Maryland, Montgomery Village, Maryland, and currently Winchester, Virginia.

Sixty Watt Shaman formed in 1996 out of a band originally called Approach, formed by Daniel Soren and Kurt Ubersax two years earlier in 1994. Ubersax and Soren recruited Joe Selby on bass and Chuck Dukehart on drums, and Approach played in and around the Baltimore area and recorded an album release. Later Ubersax was replaced on guitar by Joe Selby, and the band auditioned new bass players, selecting Jim Forrester to take on the job. They recorded and released their first studio album, Ultra Electric, in 1998. The band continued on to record two releases with Spitfire Records, and is now on Megalithic Media. Sixty Watt Shaman continues efforts focused on new music, shows, festival events in the US and Europe, and are writing and recording new music and videos for release.

== History ==
Sixty Watt Shaman was formed in 1996 by lead singer/rhythm guitarist Daniel Soren, lead guitarist Joe Selby, and drummer Chuck Dukehart, from their original band Approach, bringing in bass player Jim Forrester, when Joe Selby moved from bass to guitar to form the new project.

The band name derives from a split reference to Jim Morrison (referred to as the "Electric Shaman") and an infamous sixty watt amplifier once played by Jimi Hendrix. The band name was dubbed by vocalist Dan Soren in early September 1996 upon his return from European travel where he had visited the grave of Jim Morrison who is buried in Père Lachaise Cemetery in Paris. Jim Morrison was called the "electric shaman" by press and popular culture during his Doors years. The reference to "Sixty Watt" refers to an amplifier that was built specifically for Jimi Hendrix by the pioneering amplifier manufacturer Jim Marshall; it was a special sixty-watt amplifier which was used during live performances and on the Electric Ladyland album, but was alleged to have been stolen and never recovered after Hendrix's Isle of Wight Festival performance.

The band's debut album, Ultra Electric, was recorded in two 24-hour sessions at Hound Studio in Baltimore. The session were produced by Sixty Watt Shaman and engineered by Frank Marchand in 1998 and released on the independent label Game Two Records. Also recorded, studio outtake track "Red Colony" was released on the Welcome to MeteorCity (MeteorCity) compilation, marked as a ground breaking release for its showcase of up and coming heavy rock bands. Soon after, the band also recorded two tracks with Baltimore producer/engineer Jon Smulyan with a mobile unit at The Regal Beagle rehearsal studio the band had built in the loft of an early 20th century barn, at an artists colony in Reisterstown, Maryland. One track, "Whiskey Neck", was released on another seminal compilation, In the Groove, by NY's Musical Cartel Records.

After these releases, Sixty Watt embarked on a US tour from Maine to Texas with California band Nebula, while Nebula supported their recently released Let It Burn EP as their first release following their departure from Fu Manchu in 1997. In 1999, New York's Tee Pee Records released a now very rare split 7-inch with Maryland's Spirit Caravan featuring the track "Stone's Throw Away" from the Regal Beagle sessions. During this time period (1998/1999), the band had developed a friendship with members of fellow Maryland-based rock band Clutch, after playing shows with their side project The Bakerton Group, whose drummer, Jean-Paul Gaster, would later be recruited to produce their next album Seed of Decades.

In the late 1990s, the band worked tirelessly to play shows all along the East Coast with bands in and outside of their scene, including Solace, Atomic Bitchwax, Nothingface, Alabama Thunderpussy, Spirit Caravan, Unorthodox, Internal Void, Karma to Burn, Clutch and many others. They toured nationwide with Nebula and Spirit Caravan during that time period. After playing several shows in New York City and developing buzz about the band, Sixty Watt landed a showcase for Spitfire Records president Paul Bibeau at the Continental in the late summer of 1999. Bibeau offered Sixty Watt Shaman a recording contract in the downstairs backstage room immediately after their performance. Two weeks earlier, Sixty Watt had played a show at the same venue where Frank Kozik (of Man's Ruin Records fame, as well as fame for his album-cover art, concert flyer art, and directing music videos for Soundgarden and Mint Condition) had been in the audience; Kozik approached the band about an album deal following that show. Sixty Watt was extremely excited to have the honor to work with Kozik; but, with the approach by Bibeau only 14 days later, with a more extensive offer (a multi-album deal, including tour support, wide US and European distribution, PR and album support), Sixty Watt Shaman opted to go with Spitfire Records.

With one release behind them, in 1999 the band were signed by Spitfire Records and released Seed of Decades in 2000. Seed of Decades has been compared to the 1970s hard rock sound of Aerosmith and Grand Funk Railroad "with a more modern harder edge". The band toured with labelmates Black Label Society and Crowbar in support of the album in the summer of 2000, and then later with Clutch and Corrosion of Conformity.

For their 2002 release, Reason to Live, Dukehart was let go from the band and was replaced by drummer "Minnesota" Pete Campbell, who went on later to play with other acts, such as Pentagram. Former Kyuss bassist Scott Reeder was recruited to work on production for this album. It was recorded at Phase Studios in College Park, MD in 28 days. The album reveals the strong influence of the heavy music and the musicians that Sixty Watt had been on tours with over the previous two years. Reason to Live features many standout tracks including "All Things Come to Pass" which features Sixty Watt Shaman and guest performers Scott Reeder and Scott "Wino" Weinrich (The Obsessed, Saint Vitus) who were brought together again after having played together years earlier in The Obsessed for this live jam performance.

Before the release of Reason to Live, Sixty Watt Shaman toured Europe with Karma to Burn, playing with many of their European contemporaries such as Dozer. After the release, they embarked on a full US tour with Alabama Thunderpussy and dates with Clutch that culminated in a final tour date at their hometown venue, 9:30 Club, Washington, D.C., on January 4, 2003. After the end of that US tour, lead singer Daniel Soren moved to the mid-west and worked on other projects including The Mighty Nimbus with Pete Campbell; and, also, a project out of Norman, Oklahoma with Chris "Paco" Johnson and Forrest Smith, playing shows in Norman and Oklahoma City. Jim Forrester worked on other projects including The Devil You Know, Angels of Meth, Soaphammer and others. Upon his return to Maryland from Oklahoma, Dan Soren rejoined Joe Selby in another rock project, Stillhouse. Dukehart had been fired from the band and went on to other projects. Pete Campbell joined doom pioneers Pentagram on drums.

Over the years, band members continued to work both separately and together on various projects and reunions. Dukehart had a brief return for a tour to play DesertFest dates in 2014 but was fired once again by the beginning of 2015. Soon after Forrester and Soren parted ways as band mates once again, with Soren leaving the door open for future work together. Eventually, Dan Soren reformed the band with a new lineup, and, tragically, Jim Forrester died in a shooting in Baltimore in 2017.

Following the DesertFest dates in 2014, and the firing of Dukehart and parting with Forrester in 2015, lead singer Daniel Soren reformed the lineup in 2015 to include Johnny Wretched (John Koutsioukis) on bass guitar and longstanding hometown heavy rock drummer Sandy Hinden. That lineup went through 2018, followed by several more lineup changes, eventually landing on Mike Beggs and Chris Baker to round out the current group. With their new lineup, Sixty Watt Shaman moved to new home base in Winchester, VA and continues to write and record new material.

== Members ==
Current

- Daniel Soren – Vocals, Guitar
- Mike Beggs – Guitar
- Chris Baker – Bass
- Jason Budman – Drums

Former

- Joe Selby – Lead Guitar (? - 2014)
- Minnesota Pete Campbell – Drums
- Michael Nagel – Guitar
- Jeff Clemens – Bass
- Kenny Wagner – Drums (2000 - 2001)
- Todd Ingram – Guitar (2014 - 2018)
- Chuck Dukehart – Drums (1996 - 2000, 2014 - Present)
- Jim Forrester – Bass (? - 2017)

== Discography ==
Studio albums

- Ultra Electric (1998) (Game Two)
- Seed of Decades (2000) (Spitfire)
- Reason to Live (2002) (Spitfire)

Compilations

- Welcome to MeteorCity (1998) (MeteorCity)
- In the Groove (1999) (Music Cartel)

Split 7-inch

- "Stone's Throw Away" – Sixty Watt Shaman / "Darkness and Longing" – with Spirit Caravan
