= The Atomic Bitchwax =

American stoner rock band

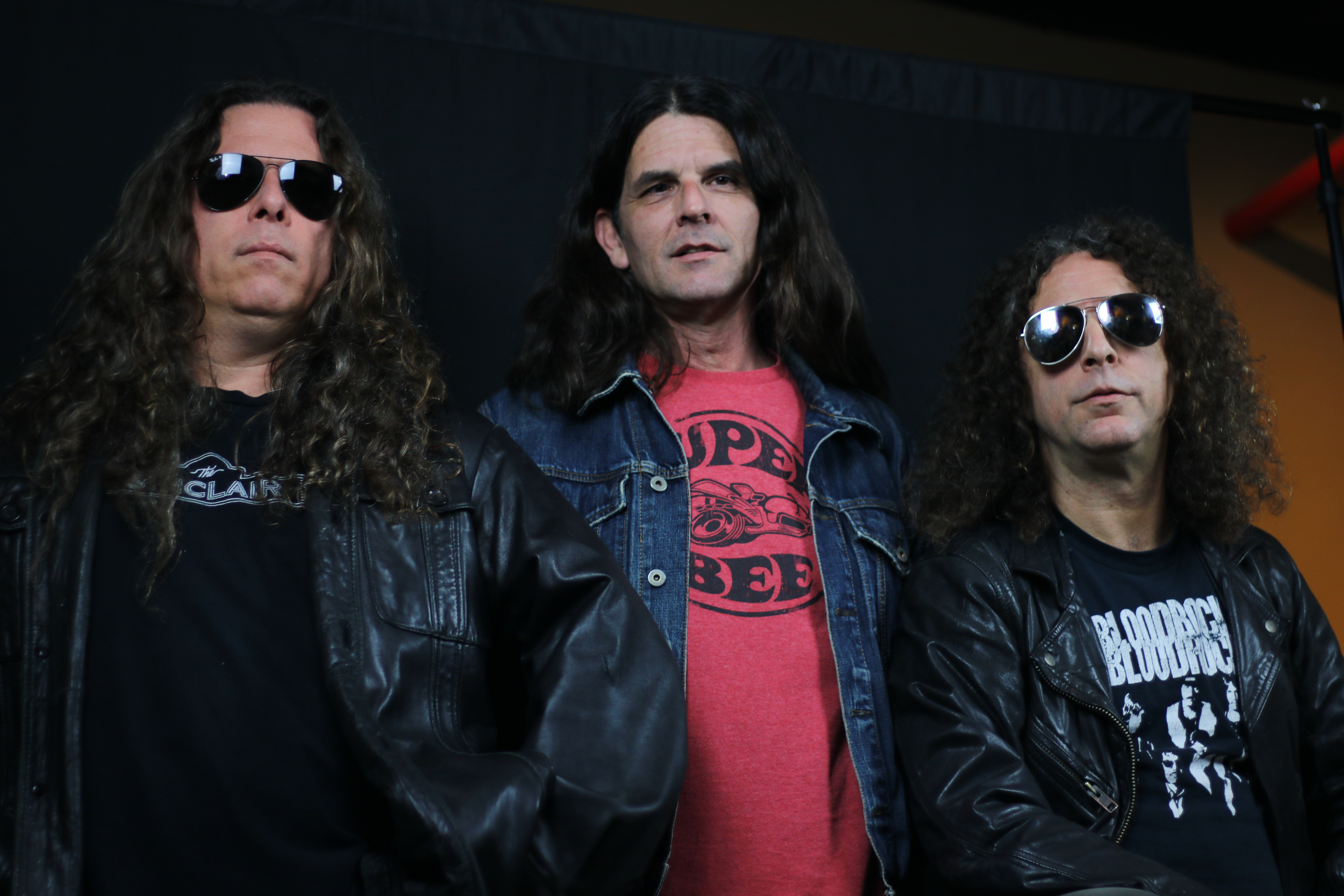
- The Atomic Bitchwax in 2020

Background information
- Origin: Neptune, New Jersey, U.S.
- Genres: Stoner rock; hard rock; stoner metal
- Years active: 1992–present
- Labels: Tee Pee, MeteorCity
- Members: Chris Kosnik; Bob Pantella; Garrett Sweeny
- Past members: Ed Mundell; Keith Ackerman; Finn Ryan

The Atomic Bitchwax is an American stoner rock band from New Jersey, formed in 1992 by bassist/singer/songwriter Chris Kosnik, guitarist Ed Mundell, and drummer Keith Ackerman. They did not release their first full-length album until 1999, upon signing with Tee Pee Records. Mixing elements of 1960s psychedelic rock and 1970s riff rock, filtered through modern progressive rock, their music has appeared in TV shows such as Jackass, Homewrecker, and various Fox Sports broadcasts.

The initial version of the group became a local jam band, performing in the New Jersey and New York area. This lineup released two full-length records: a self-titled debut in 1999 and Atomic Bitchwax II in 2000. Additionally, they released the Spit Blood EP in 2002 via the MeteorCity label. In 2004, Mundell was unable to keep up with the planned tour schedule and was replaced by guitarist/vocalist Finn Ryan (formerly of Core). Since then, the band has released nine studio albums and has performed 1,500 live concerts. Their 2006 EP Boxriff was engineered by Jack Endino.

Current Monster Magnet drummer Bob Pantella joined the band in 2007, and the album TAB4 was released the following year. In 2011, they released the album The Local Fuzz, which consisted of a single 42-minute track featuring 50 riffs played back-to-back. In the following years, the band toured worldwide. Kosnik became a member of Monster Magnet in 2013, in addition to his duties with The Atomic Bitchwax. The album Gravitron was released in 2015, followed by Force Field in 2017. Ryan left the band after 15 years in 2018, and was replaced by Monster Magnet guitarist Garrett Sweeny, who appears on the band's 2020 release Scorpio.

== Band members ==
Current

- Chris Kosnik – bass, vocals
- Bob Pantella – drums, percussion
- Garrett Sweeny – lead guitar, vocals

Past

- Ed Mundell – guitar
- Keith Ackerman – drums, percussion
- Finn Ryan – guitar, vocals

== Discography ==
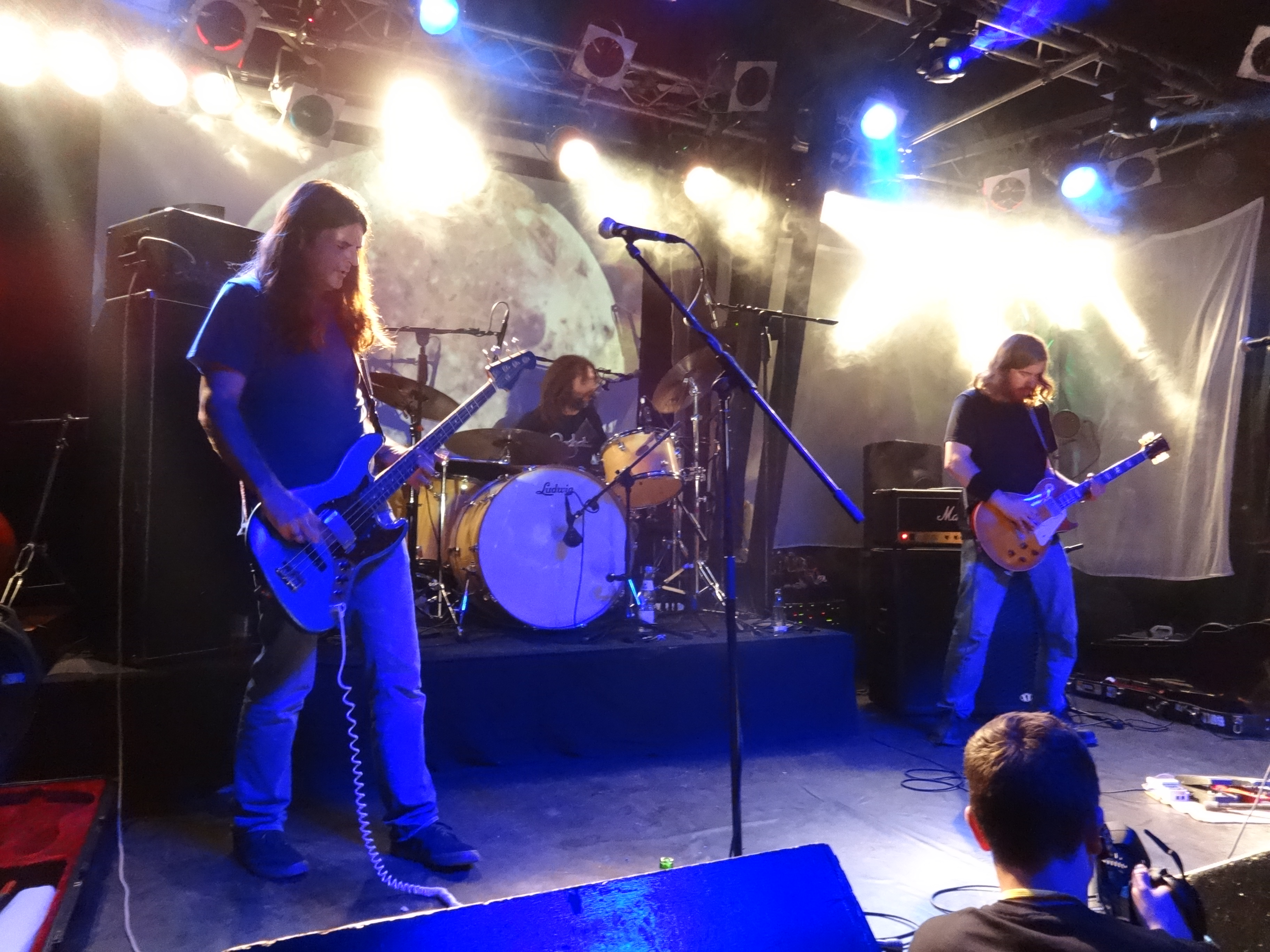
The band performing in 2014

=== Albums ===
- The Atomic Bitchwax (1999)
- Atomic Bitchwax II (2000)
- 3 (2005)
- TAB 4/T4B (2008)
- The Local Fuzz (2011)
- Gravitron (2015)
- Force Field (2017)
- Scorpio (2020)

=== EPs ===
- Spit Blood (2002)
- Boxriff (2006)

=== Compilation appearances ===
- "Hey Alright" on Welcome to Meteor City (1999)
- "Combination" on Right in the Nuts: A Tribute to Aerosmith (2000)
- "Kiss the Sun" on Doomed (2000)
- "Liquor Queen" on The Mighty Desert Rock Avengers (2002)
- "Hey Alright" on Guerrilla Jukebox Vol 1 (2003)
- "STD" & "The Destroyer" on ...And Back to Earth Again (2007)
