= Tee Pee Records =

American independent rock music record label

- Founded: 1993
- Distributor(s): All That Is Heavy; The Orchard (US); Cargo Records (EU)
- Genre: Psychedelic rock, heavy metal, hard rock, punk rock
- Country of origin: United States
- Location: New York City
- Official website: teepeerecords.com

Tee Pee Records is an American independent rock music record label founded by Tony Presedo in 1993 in New York City. It is prominent for releasing music by Sleep, Witch, Graveyard, Earthless, High on Fire and the Brian Jonestown Massacre. It has housed many stoner rock bands.

== Roster ==
=== Current artists ===
- Ancestors
- Assemble Head in Sunburst Sound
- Burning Love
- Carousel
- Coliseum
- Earthless
- Graveyard
- Hopewell
- Imaad Wasif
- Jason Simon of Dead Meadow
- Joy
- Karma to Burn
- Naam
- Nebula
- Night Horse
- Quest for Fire
- Ruby the Hatchet
- The Skull
- Spindrift
- Sweat
- The Warlocks
- Witch

=== Past artists ===
- All Night
- Annihilation Time
- Bad Wizard
- Black NASA
- Boulder
- The Brian Jonestown Massacre
- Buzzkill
- Chrome Locust
- Cloudland Canyon
- Core
- Mark D
- Drunk Horse
- Eldopa
- Entrance
- The Everyones
- Gonga
- Hermano
- High on Fire
- The High Strung
- Immortal Lee County Killers
- The J.J. Paradise Players Club
- Kadavar
- Kalas
- Kreisor
- Leechmilk
- Logical Nonsense
- Lost Goat
- The Lovetones
- Maplewood
- The Mystick Krewe of Clearlight
- On Trial
- Pay Neuter
- Priestess
- Raging Slab
- Sixty Watt Shaman
- Sleep
- Sofa King Killer
- Spirit Caravan
- Teeth of the Hydra
- Throttle
- Titan
- Tricky Woo
- Whirr
- Ya Ho Wha 13
