= Stoner rock =

Rock music genre

- Other names: Stoner metal; stoner doom
- Stylistic origins: Acid rock; doom metal; psychedelic rock
- Cultural origins: Early 1990s, California, United States
- Typical instruments: Electric guitar; bass; drums; vocals

Subgenres
- Desert rock

Local scenes
- Palm Desert Scene

Other topics
- Blues rock; cannabis culture; garage punk; hard rock; sludge metal; grunge

Stoner rock, also known as stoner metal or stoner doom, is a rock music fusion genre that combines elements of doom metal with psychedelic rock and acid rock. The genre emerged during the early 1990s and was pioneered foremost by Kyuss and Sleep.

== Characteristics ==
Stoner rock is typically slow- to mid-tempo and features a heavily distorted, groove-laden bass-heavy sound, melodic vocals, and "retro" production. Due to the similarities between stoner and sludge metal, there is often a crossover between the two genres. This hybrid has traits of both styles, but generally lacks stoner metal's laid back atmosphere and its usage of psychedelia. Bands such as Weedeater, High on Fire and Electric Wizard creatively fuse both styles.

=== Terminology ===
The descriptor "stoner rock" may originate from the title of the 1997 Roadrunner Records compilation Burn One Up! Music for Stoners. Desert rock is also used interchangeably as a descriptor, and was coined by a MeteorCity Records intern, around the time the label released the 1998 stoner rock compilation Welcome to MeteorCity; however, not all stoner rock bands would fall under the descriptor of "desert rock", since bands under this subgenre tend to include more hard rock characteristics.

=== Cannabis influence on the genre ===
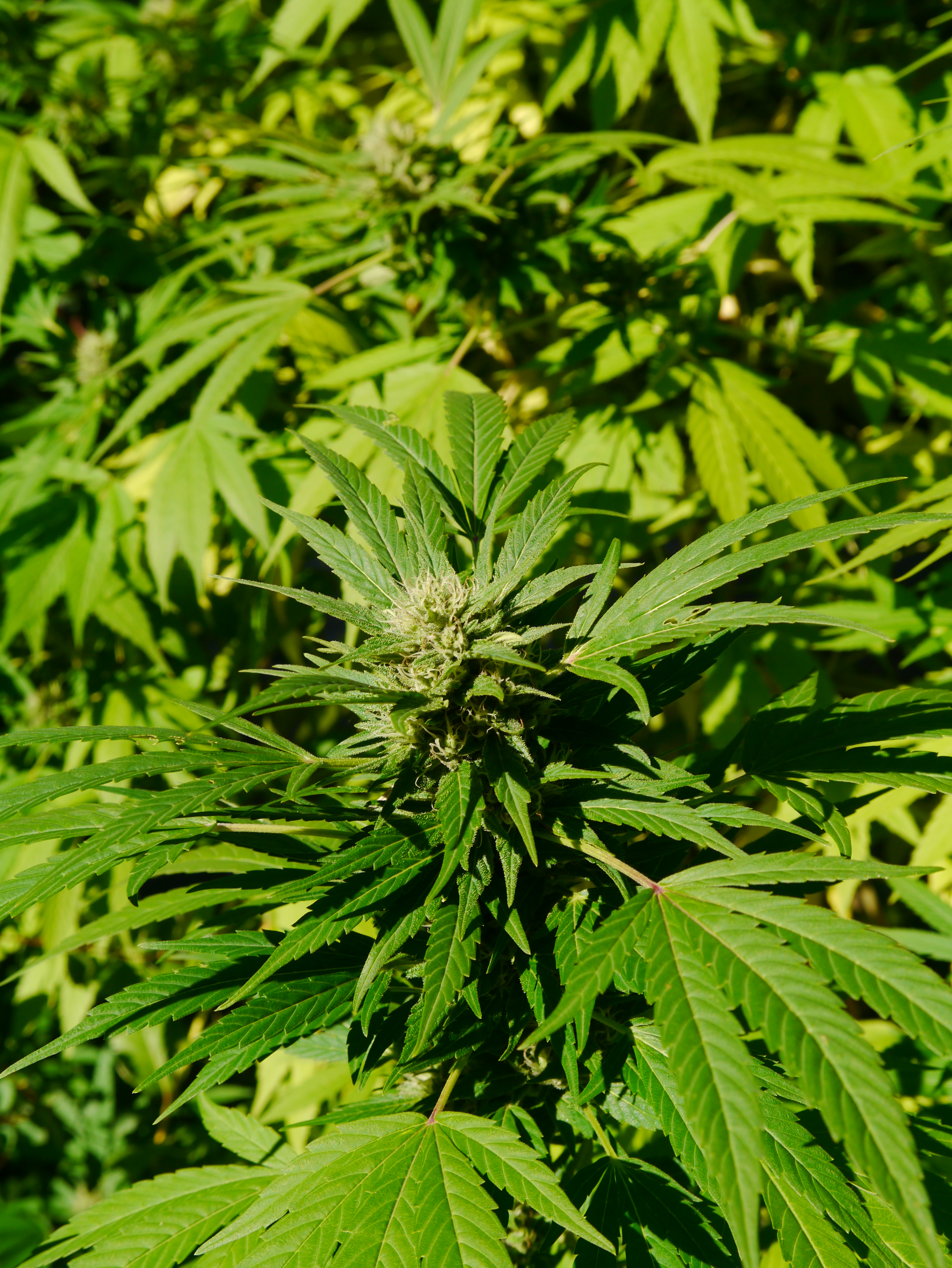
A cannabis plant

The involvement of cannabis in the creation of "stoner rock/metal" can range among bands in the genre. Bands such as Sleep have involved the concept of cannabis to be part of the core of their albums and songs. The consumption of cannabis is common in the live performances of some stoner rock/metal bands, and bands such as Electric Wizard are known to have concerts with the band members and the crowd participating in smoking cannabis. Dopesmoker (previously Jerusalem) by Sleep received controversy because the 60-minute song is about cannabis, which resulted in conflict with Sleep's record company. Some members of the genre state that "stoner rock is a style, not life," which is interpreted as the band members do not participate in smoking cannabis or are influenced by cannabis. However, the style of their music reflects the sound of "stoner rock/metal." Bands such as King Caravan and Sea of Green have come to terms with this statement. Similarly, Matt Pike from the band High on Fire stated, "It's a very strong scene, but I don't think any of the stoner rock bands want to be labeled as stoner rock ... I might use the word 'stoner' in my lyrics, but I think we're metal, dude. I'd say I was crossover metal, actually, or progressive metal. It's kind of a tough thing to lump into a category, but I guess we get the stoner-rock label because of the whole pot thing."

== History ==
=== Influences (1960s to mid-1980s) ===
Like most subgenres of music, the origins of stoner rock are hard to trace and pinpoint. Nevertheless, several known progenitors and signature songs are widely credited with helping shape the genre. Blue Cheer is considered one of the pioneers of the style; as AllMusic author Greg Prato puts it, "When talks about 'stoner rock' come up, one band that tends to get overlooked is Blue Cheer." According to critic Mark Deming, Blue Cheer's first album, Vincebus Eruptum, "is a glorious celebration of rock & roll primitivism run through enough Marshall amps to deafen an army," not unlike the heaviness of MC5's Kick Out the Jams and the Velvet Underground's White Light/White Heat.

Rolling Stone claims, "What stoner rock delivers, slowed down and magnified, is the riff, the persistent legacy of Mississippi blues. Led Zeppelin and Black Sabbath were the first to make a monolith of it." Sir Lord Baltimore were called "the godfathers of stoner rock" by Classic Rock magazine, who went on to state that Leaf Hound have been cited for influencing countless bands in the stoner rock movement, including Kyuss and Monster Magnet. James Manning of Time Out London recognises The Beatles' "I Want You (She's So Heavy)" as "laying the foundations for stoner rock with the relentlessly spiralling outro".

Buffalo's 1973 sophomore release Volcanic Rock has been "heralded as the first great stoner rock record," the song "Sunrise (Come My Way)" "has since been shamelessly cannibalized for its parts by more stoner-rock bands than you can shake a bong at," and the songs "Till My Death" and "The Prophet" have been likened to later stoner rock. Primevil's album Smokin' Bats at Campton's has been called a "touchstone" of stoner rock. Jim DeRogatis has said that stoner rock bands are "reaching back for inspiration to the psychedelic, proto-metallic jamming of bands like Cream, Black Sabbath, Deep Purple, and Hawkwind."

According to DeRogatis, the roots of stoner rock can be heard on Black Sabbath's Master of Reality, Hawkwind's 25 Years On 1973–1977 box set, the aforementioned Blue Cheer album, Deep Purple's Machine Head and Blue Öyster Cult's Workshop of the Telescopes. The 1970s California-based supergroup Captain Beyond have also been described as "pioneers" of stoner rock. Black Sabbath's Master of Reality is often cited as the first album of the genre, and Martin Popoff states: "When 'Sweet Leaf' kicks in, one witnesses simultaneously the invention of stoner rock". Allmusic summarizes this unique fusion as follows: "Stoner metal bands updated the long, mind-bending jams and ultra-heavy riffs of bands like Black Sabbath, Blue Cheer, Blue Öyster Cult, and Hawkwind by filtering their psychedelia-tinged metal and acid rock through the buzzing sound of early Sub Pop–style grunge." However, Kyuss members Josh Homme and John Garcia have shrugged off the heavy metal influence, and instead cite punk rock and hardcore punk, particularly the sludgy hardcore of Black Flag's album My War as influences.

=== Early development (late 1980s–1990s) ===
The doom metal band Trouble introduced acid rock elements on their 1990 self-titled album, which became even more prominent on 1992's Manic Frustration. Similarly, the British doom metal band Cathedral increasingly moved toward a psychedelic/stoner sound over the course of their first three releases, culminating in the critically acclaimed 1993 album The Ethereal Mirror. During this same period, heavy metal band White Zombie achieved multi-platinum success with their two major label albums, significantly expanding the heavy music audience with their groove-based, sample-laden "psychedelic horror" sound.

During the early to mid-1990s, a number of southern-California bands developed the style that would be called stoner rock. In 1992, Kyuss emerged from the Palm Desert Scene with Blues for the Red Sun. Critics have hailed it as "a major milestone in heavy music," while NME described their music as an attempt to figuratively melt "a hundredweight of hot desert sand into metal". In 1992, San Jose doom metal band Sleep released their album Sleep's Holy Mountain, and along with Kyuss were heralded by the heavy metal press as leaders of the emerging stoner scene. These two bands were among the first to introduce a psychedelic groove to their doom-influenced sound. A year earlier, New Jersey's Monster Magnet released their debut album Spine of God, which displayed fewer metal influences but was psychedelic and sludgy, in the vein of their California peers. Together with these three bands, southern-Californians Fu Manchu, who released their eponymous album in 1994, are credited with being "one of the most enduring and influential bands" of the genre. In 1994, San Francisco's Acid King and Britain's Acrimony released their debut albums, both of which adopted this psychedelic approach to doom metal. Though more closely associated with the grunge movement (which itself sometimes influenced, was influenced by, and occasionally overlapped with stoner rock), Soundgarden has also been cited as "stoner metal" or influential on the stoner rock genre, with their 1994 album Superunknown being described as a "stoner rock classic". Other influential bands from this era include Clutch, Sons of Otis and Corrosion of Conformity.

=== Middle years (1995–1999) ===
Kyuss broke up in 1995 after the release of their fourth album, with many members going on to develop the stoner and desert rock scene through new projects. In August 1997, Kyuss' Josh Homme founded The Desert Sessions at the now-famous Rancho De La Luna in Joshua Tree, California. This musical collective brings artists together for impromptu writing and recording sessions that yielded ten albums between 1997 and 2003. The project has included members from Kyuss, Fu Manchu, Soundgarden, Monster Magnet, Goatsnake, earthlings? and Eagles of Death Metal, as well as PJ Harvey, Dean Ween and others associated with the Palm Desert scene. Also in 1997, Roadrunner Records released the stoner rock compilation Burn One Up! Music for Stoners, which includes many of the aforementioned bands, as well as a track by Josh Homme's new band Queens of the Stone Age. In September 1997 Jadd Shickler (of stoner band Spiritu) and Aaron Emmel founded an online store based in Albuquerque, New Mexico called All That's Heavy, which began selling hard-to-find releases of Kyuss, Monster Magnet, and Fu Manchu. They soon expanded the catalog to include artists who stylistically fit with those bands. After half a year, they were contacted by the former proprietor of the first Kyuss fan website, who recommended All That's Heavy do a compilation of unsigned bands that Kyuss fans would enjoy. This resulted in the formation of MeteorCity Records and the release of the compilation Welcome to MeteorCity in 1998, which included established desert and stoner rock acts, as well as new bands established by John Garcia of Kyuss, Ed Mundell of Monster Magnet, and Pete Stahl of Goatsnake. The album was the first time that the new stoner rock bands Sixty Watt Shaman, Lowrider, The Atomic Bitchwax, Dozer, Goatsnake, and Los Natas were featured on record. According to MeteorCity founders:

"When this was happening, there wasn't really a [stoner rock] scene yet, there were just a lot of people around the world who were still sad about the end of Kyuss, as well as the end of Slo Burn, and who listened to stuff like Monster Magnet and Fu Manchu but wanted more. The label took off when we appeared with Welcome to Meteor City, as though the world was waiting for someone to do what we were doing."

MeteorCity soon signed a number of musicians and bands from the Palm Desert Scene, including Hermano, Unida and emerging Swedish stoner rock bands such as Lowrider, Dozer and The Mushroom River Band. During this time, The Hidden Hand and Spirit Caravan also began to gain popularity within the developing scene.

=== Mainstream exposure (2000–present) ===
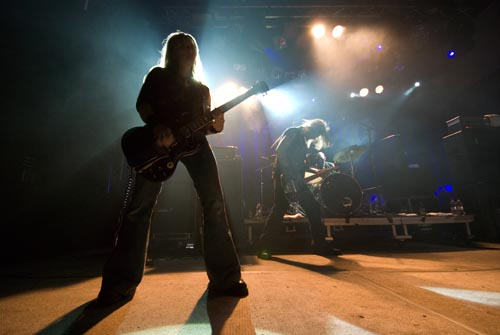
Stoner metal band Electric Wizard (active since 1993) performing live at Hole in the Sky 2008

In June 2000, Josh Homme's new project Queens of the Stone Age released their breakthrough album Rated R, which helped bring the stoner rock sound into the mainstream, despite the band themselves rejecting both the genre and being labeled as such.

Songs for the Deaf, their next release in 2002, included a single from the album peaking at No. 1 on the US Modern Rock Tracks. Another label focusing on the international stoner rock scene was Small Stone Records, which released a number of compilation albums of stoner rock bands doing covers of 1970s music, including Right in the Nuts: A Tribute to Aerosmith (2000), Sucking the 70's (2002), and Sucking the 70's – Back in the Saddle Again (2006).

In 2002, the Orquesta del Desierto was formed, featuring key members of the major desert rock bands and released two albums.

In 2009, the magazines Decibel and Terrorizer released issues featuring a list of the 100 greatest and most important albums of the 2000s, respectively. The stoner band Electric Wizard's Dopethrone was featured on both lists, being placed 10th on Decibel's list and 1st on Terrorizer's list.

Since Kyuss' break-up, the success of the bandmates' other projects has caused the Kyuss back catalog to become more widely listened to and their fanbase has inevitably swelled. The sound has been continued on by directly descendant bands Unida, Slo Burn, Hermano, Mondo Generator, Fu Manchu, Brant Bjork and the Bros, and at times by Queens of the Stone Age, who have since largely departed from Kyuss' stoner rock sound, and reject the label, preferring the term "desert rock".

=== The European scene: stoner rock and beyond ===
As acknowledged by Dave Wyndorf, the lead singer of Monster Magnet, in a 2015 interview: "Europe is really good for psychedelic music." So much so that some US stoner rock bands will even choose to tour Europe rather than North America. Founded by a French aficionado of stoner rock, the website MoreFuzz.net has been a big promoter of the stoner rock scene in Europe and internationally. Stoner rock bands in Europe, much like their North American counterparts, mix elements of heavy rock music with psychedelia and acid rock. The influence of Black Sabbath or Blue Cheer can be heard – among other examples – in bands such as the Swedish Graveyard and the German Kadavar. Instrumental stoner rock bands such as Karma to Burn are rare in the US but are more frequent in Europe.

== See also ==
- List of stoner rock bands
- Category:Stoner rock
- Palm Desert Scene
- Doom metal
- Sludge metal
- Psychedelic rock
- Acid rock
