= The Long Forever =

EP by Elephant Tree & Lowrider
- Released: October 10, 2024
- Recorded: 2024
- Venue: The Forum
- Studios: KM and XLN Studios, Karlskoga, Sweden
- Genre: Stoner rock
- Length: 44:09
- Label: Blues Funeral Recordings
- Producers: Jack Townley; Peder Bergstrand

Elephant Tree chronology
Handful of Ten (2024)	The Long Forever (2024)	Best of Jethro Tull (Redux) (2024)

Lowrider chronology
Refractions (2020)	The Long Forever (2024)	Best of Jethro Tull (Redux) (2024)

Singles from The Long Forever
- 1. "The Long Forever" Released: 23 July 2024; 2. "And the Horse You Rode in On" Released: 13 September 2024; 3. "Through the Rift" Released: 10 October 2024

The Long Forever is a double EP featuring independent and collaboration songs from the Swedish stoner rock band Lowrider and the British psychedelic doom rock band Elephant Tree. It was released on 25 October 2024 through Blues Funeral Recordings. The beginning of a collaboration that continued with tracks contributed to the 2024 album The Very Best of Jethro Tull Redux which was released on 6 December 2024 through Magnetic Eye Records. The Long Forever itself achieved a peak chart ranking of 80 on the UK Album Downloads Chart.

== Background ==
Before collaborating the bands became mutual fans of each other's works when Lowrider's bassist/synth/vocalist Peder Bergstrand discovered the song "Sails" from the 2020 album Habits which was described by Kez Whelen of Metal Hammer as a track "nailing that sweet spot between flattening amp-worship and ecstatic, summery pop euphoria." The song was described in an interview with Revolver with Elephant Tree's vocalist/guitarist Jack Townley as the one song he would recommend as an introduction to the band's sound saying, "We really put a mix of everything we do into that one and it's probably the best way to ease yourself into Elephant Tree." In a joint interview with both bands Townley heard Lowrider's ""rippling Hammond" organ featured song "Ode to Ganymede" from the 2020 album Refractions leading him to share it as a rare discovery of new music he actually appreciated to the rest of the band.

Lowrider had songs recorded from the Refractions sessions that they wanted to release on a separate project so Jadd Shickler from Blues Funeral Recordings contacted both bands about a split album. Speaking with Rockbladet Bergstrand stated about the origins of the new and future music stating "We're probably sitting on material for at least one more album, after we finish this EP that we're doing now with Elephant Tree. There will be four songs in the fall of 2024, and then hopefully a full album in 2025." Continuing the musical theme from the previous album's last track to the first track of Lowrider's split album they said, "What's the best response to the [eleven minute long song] "Piperider"? A two minute punk track!" This resulted in the song "And The Horse You Rode In On". The band's first music video was made for the song by Bergstrand who also created the album's layout in conjunction with illustrations from Johnny Dombrowski in which he said, "I've done more music videos for others than I can remember (for Greenleaf and Dozer among others) but somehow this is our first."

In 2023 Townley "was put in hospital by an unfortunately placed lamppost" as a result of a serious bicycle accident that left him in an induced coma. He gave the nickname "The Long Forever" to the recovery experience that followed which is where the album title came from. Afterwards he and the band began the use of Orange Amps including the Rockerverb MKIII, Slattery used the Rockerverb 50 MKII, and Holland used the Terror Bass and an Orange Crush Pro 120. In response to the reasons and benefits for going with these amplifiers Townley responded, "Orange to me is very much freedom and sound."

== Critical reception ==
Professional ratings
Review scores
Source	Rating
Core and Co	8.42/10
Distorted Sound	9/10
PowerMetal.de	7.5/10
Visions	8/12

Each band's tracks retained their individual band sound but a third sound was created as brought out by Games, Brrraaains & A Head-Banging Life where "the two powerhouses combined is something else entirely" and "as great as both bands' individual tracks have been, their combined efforts have delivered some of the more unique stuff overall." The characteristics of the rock supergroup with multiple established bands creating a new sound led Distorted Sound to entitle them as the "stoner/heavy psych supergroup for the ages." Metal Hammer's Rich Hobson said the collaborative track "The Long Forever" showcased the bands "command of tone and propulsive dynamics." Also noting the standout instrumentation on display PowerMetal.de stated about the track "Through The Rift" seeing a "direct collaboration that, thanks in no small part to the strong guitar work, remains one of the many highlights on "The Long Forever." The leadoff Lowrider track "And the Horse You Rode in On" was described as a desert rock influenced riff based song done in a shorter length and faster punk style by Visions. Another review from the Sleeping Shaman said that it "is a song that will get you out of the saddle and moving about the place." In review of the performance of the song at the 2025 Desertfest in London it was noted that "If the crowd wasn't moshing before "And The Horse You Rode In On", it was after."

== Track listing ==
=== Lowrider ===
All tracks written by Peder Bergstrand and performed by Lowrider.

No.	Title	Writer(s)	Length
1.	"And The Horse You Rode In On"	Lowrider	2:55
2.	"Caldera"	Lowrider	9:57
3.	"Into The Grey"	Lowrider	7:14
4.	"Through The Rift"	Lowrider featuring Elephant Tree	3:41

=== Elephant Tree ===
All music written and performed by Elephant Tree.

No.	Title	Writer(s)	Length
5.	"Fucked In The Head"	Elephant Tree	9:23
6.	"4 For 2"	Elephant Tree	5:04
7.	"Long Forever"	Elephant Tree featuring Lowrider	5:55

== Personnel ==
Credits adapted from the album liner notes.

=== Elephant Tree ===
- Jack Townley – Guitar, Vocals, Synth
- Peter Holland – Bass, Vocals
- John Slattery – Guitar, Synth, Vocals
- Sam Hart – Drums
- Peder Bergstrand – Vocals on "Long Forever"

=== Lowrider ===
- Andreas Eriksson – Drums
- Niclas Stålfors – Guitars
- Ole Hellqvist – Guitars
- Peder Bergstrand – Vocals, Bass, Guitars, Keys
- Jack Townley, Peter Holland, John Slattery, and Sam Hart – Vocals on "Through the Rift"

== Production ==
=== Elephant Tree ===
- All tracks written and performed by Elephant Tree
- Recording – Erik Myles
- Studio – The Forum
- Mixer – Luke Pickering
- Engineering – Emlyn Spiers

=== Lowrider ===
- All tracks written by Peder Bergstrand
- Drum recording – Andreas Eriksson at KM Studios, Karlskoga
- Stålfors guitars – Home studio, Karlskoga
- Hellqvist guitars – XLN Studios, Stockholm
- Bergstrand vocals and instruments – XLN Studios, Lake Nerbjärken, and home studio
- Production – Peder Bergstrand
- Mixer, Mastering – Karl Daniel Lidén

=== Artwork ===
- Illustrations – Johnny Dombrowski
- Art direction, layout – Peder Bergstrand

== Charts ==
Chart performance for The Long Forever
Chart (2024)	Peak position
UK Album Downloads (Official Charts)	80
