= Distanced from Reality =

Studio album / live album by Solace
- Released: 1999
- Genre: Stoner metal
- Label: MeteorCity Records, Freebird Records
- Producer: Eric Rachel, Solace

Solace chronology
Distanced from Reality (1999)	Further (2000)

Professional ratings
Review scores
Source	Rating
AllMusic	3/5 stars

Distanced from Reality is the first split album from New Jersey heavy metal band Solace and Solarized under the generic name "Jersey Devils".

The album's cover art was done by Larsupilami.

Recorded at Trax East Studios, South River, New Jersey and ~Recorded Live, Mixed at Subterranean Sound, Long Branch, New Jersey

== Track listing ==
1. SOLARIZED "Slide" – 4:06
2. SOLARIZED "Drifter" – 3:13
3. SOLARIZED "Crucible" – 4:17
4. SOLARIZED "Sugar Bag" – 2:44
5. SOLACE "Heavy Birth/2-Fisted" – 8:29
6. SOLACE "Dirt" – 8:04
7. SOLACE "Try" – 6:17
8. SOLACE "Funk #49 (Live in Tokyo'98)" – 7:45~ (The James Gang cover)

== Line up ==
- Jason: Vocals, Lyrics
- Rob Hultz: Bass
- Tommy Southard: Guitars
- Jason Silverino: Drums
- Additional Drums by Matt Gunvordahl
