= Demon Cleaner =

Demon Cleaner may refer to:

- Demon Cleaner (band), a Swedish stoner rock band
- "Demon Cleaner" (song), a song by Kyuss, from the album Welcome to Sky Valley
