= In Splendor Below =

Studio album by October Tide
- Released: 17 May 2019
- Recorded: 2018
- Studio: Tri-Lamd studios
- Genre: Death-doom; death metal
- Length: 43:57
- Label: Agonia
- Producer: Alexander Backlund

October Tide chronology
Winged Waltz (2016)	In Splendor Below (2019)	The Cancer Pledge (2023)

In Splendor Below is the sixth studio album by Swedish death-doom band October Tide. It was released on 17 May 2019. In Splendor Below was mixed and mastered by Daniel Lidén (Bloodbath, Katatonia, Breach, Craft), produced by Alexander Backlund, and released by Agonia Records.

== Track listing ==
No.	Title	Length
1.	"I, the Polluter"	4:49
2.	"We Died in October"	4:58
3.	"Ögonblick av nåd" ("Moment of Grace")	4:44
4.	"Stars Starve Me"	6:13
5.	"Our Famine"	4:47
6.	"Guide My Pulse"	5:04
7.	"Seconds"	6:57
8.	"Envy of the Moon"	6:25
Total length:		43:57

== Personnel ==
=== October Tide ===
- Fred "North" Norrman – guitar
- Jonas Sköld – drums
- Mattias "Kryptan" Norrman – guitar
- Johan Jönsegård – bass
- Alexander Högbom – vocals

=== Additional personnel ===
- Christine Linde – artwork
- Alexander Backlund – production, recording
- Daniel Lidén – mixing, mastering
- Cursed Art – layout design
