= Stonewall Noise Orchestra =

Swedish rock band

StoneWall Noise Orchestra
- Origin: Borlänge, Sweden
- Genres: Stoner rock
- Label: M2 Recordings
- Members: Mr. Pillow: Drums; Snicken: Guitar; Singe: Vocals; Jansson: Guitar; Jonas: Bass
- Past members: John Hermansen: Vocals

StoneWall Noise Orchestra is a Swedish rock band formed in Borlänge in 2004 by members of the defunct Demon Cleaner, Snicken and Jansson, with Singe (guest vocalist in Greenleaf) and former Unhuman Fear drummer Mr. Pillow and bass player Jonas. In 2005 they released their first album Vol. 1 on Daredevil Records and in 2008 rereleased it with bonus tracks. In 2006 John Hermansen replaced Singe as the singer. After the recording of their second album Hermansen left the band and Singe returned. In 2008 they released their second album Constants In An Ever Changing Universe on M2 Recordings which received a KKKK rating from Kerrang! and 8/10 from Metal Hammer.

They have been described as being old Black Sabbath meets Monster Magnet. They have toured in Germany and Belgium.

== Discography ==
- Vol. 1 (2005) - Daredevil Records
- Constants In An Ever Changing Universe (2008) - M2 Recordings
- Sweet Mississippi Deal (2010) - Transubstans
- Salvation (2013) - Transubstans Records
- The Machine, The Devil & The Dope (2016) - Steamhammer
- Deathtripper (2020) - Transubstans Records
