= In the Tail of a Comet =

In the Tail of the Comet

Studio album by Dozer
- Released: April 25, 2000
- Recorded: February 1999 at the Rockhouse Studio in Borlänge, Sweden
- Genre: Stoner metal
- Length: 37:16
- Label: Man's Ruin Records
- Producers: Dozer and Bengt Backe

Dozer chronology
Coming Down The Mountain (Split EP with Unida) (1999)	In the Tail of the Comet (2000)	Madre de Dios (2001)

In The Tail of a Comet is the debut album by the Swedish stoner rock band Dozer, released on April 25, 2000, through Man's Ruin Records. It was recorded in February 1999 at the Rockhouse Studio in Borlänge, Sweden, for about $500. All songs were mixed and produced by Dozer with Bengt Backe.

== Critical reception ==
Professional ratings
Review scores
Source	Rating
AllMusic	3/5 stars
Metal Hammer	8/10

Critical reception was generally mixed with a lean towards the positive. AllMusic noted it was more reminiscent of Metallica than the genre-defining Black Sabbath, and "falls short of exceptional, but it's a satisfying effort that has more plusses than minuses."

CMJ Music Review was generally positive, indicating it was a strong visceral experience and a promising debut album, although it lacked musical depth.

== Track listing ==
No.	Title	Length
1.	"Supersoul"	2:44
2.	"Lightyears Ahead"	5:13
3.	"Speeder"	3:51
4.	"Inside the Falcon"	3:59
5.	"Riding The Machine"	3:51
6.	"Cupola"	2:03
7.	"Grand Dragon"	5:54
8.	"Captain Spaceheart"	3:40
9.	"High Roller"	6:01
Total length:		37:16

== Personnel ==
- Fredrik Nordin – vocals, rhythm guitar
- Tommi Holappa – lead guitar
- Johan Rockner – bass guitar
- Erik Bäckwall – drums
