= Drifting in the Endless Void =

Studio album by Dozer
- Released: 21 April 2023
- Recorded: 2021–2022
- Studios: Gröndahl (Stockholm); Deacon Street (Borlänge)
- Genres: Stoner rock; stoner metal; psychedelic rock
- Length: 42:47
- Label: Blues Funeral Recordings
- Producers: Dozer; Karl Daniel Lidén

Dozer chronology
Beyond Colossal (2008)	Drifting in the Endless Void (2023)

Singles from Drifting In The Endless Void
- 1. "Ex‐human, Now Beast" Released: 21 February 2023; 2. "Dust for Blood" Released: 28 March 2023

Drifting in the Endless Void is the sixth studio album by the Swedish stoner rock band Dozer. It was released on 21 April 2023 through Blues Funeral Records. It is Dozer's first studio album since the release of Beyond Colossal in 2008 which is the longest gap between albums for the band at 15 years. This is also the band's first album to feature drummer Sebastian Olsson with the rest of the lineup remaining the same as on previous studio albums.

== Background and production ==
Dozer entered the studio in 2021 to begin recording with previous collaborator Karl Daniel Lidén handling the production and recording duties. The extended gap since the bands last album was explained by Dozer bassist Johan Rockner in an interview leading up to their Deserfest London appearance saying, "We never called it a quit; we just took a break for three years while Fredrik finished his studies. Then we played live almost every year after that."

Singer/guitarist Fredrik Nordin stated about the bands initial direction for the album, "How it will sound? No one knows. All we can tell you is that it will be something to look forward to, because it's gonna be one hell of a trip." Lead guitarist Tommi Holappa later commented, "after we finished "Missing 13", the first song we wrote for the album, we knew we were onto something." The band decided to make a concept album based upon the theme of this song, he added, ""Missing 13" is the plot of the story and the rest of the songs are based on the same concept. We received this Earth from our ancestors and took it for granted. We humans are little cogs in this big machine, and sometimes that can make you feel very small and helpless. Hence this feeling of "drifting in the endless void"".

Upon discovering that they were recording a new album Jadd Shickler who worked with the band previously when he ran MeteorCity Records and released one of their early recordings as the Unida/Dozer split EP signed them to a record deal with his current label, Blues Funeral Recordings.

== Release and promotion ==
"Ex‐human, Now Beast" was the first single released on 21 February 2023. Peder Bergstrand who created the albums artwork and directed the song's video, explained, "The result is a mix of horror, humor, and these relentless animated nightmare sections that I think match the track's non-stop rocket fuel drum parts really well." The following single released was "Dust for Blood" on 28 March 2023. Nordin elaborated on how "Dust for Blood" fit into the theme of the album stating, "we give this earth to the next generation, and it's basically in ruins. Some care, some do not. Is it all an illusion? Or is it real? Is it all too much to grasp? Is all hope lost? No, it never is and never will be."

== Touring ==
Among various live dates in support of the album they appeared at the Desertfest London on 6 May 2023. In review of their performance Paul Brannigan representing Louder Sound commented, Drifting In The Endless Void, the group's first album in 15 years, might be their best yet, and given its UK premiere here, seven-minute-plus opener "Mutation/Transformation" is an absolute monster worthy of comparisons to Kyuss." Emily Castles from The Midlands Rocks noted the public response of the newer songs sharing, "these new punk-ish, sci-fi themed tracks really made waves" with the crowd during their performance.

== Reception ==
Professional ratings
Review scores
Source	Rating
Blabbermouth.net	8/10
Distorted Sound	9/10
Metal Epidemic	4/5 stars
Metal Temple	9/10
Reverb Is for Lovers	7.1/10
Rock Hard	8/10
Visions	8/12

Drifting in the Endless Void received consistently positive reviews acknowledging a growth in songwriting and instrumentation. This was brought out by Blabbermouth.net stating Drifting in the Endless Void reveals a band that have transcended their roots and found a smarter and deeper way to shine." In regard to specific tracks they said, ""Mutation/Transformation" and "Ex-Human, Now Beast" showcase their expanded remit. This is still stoner rock by design and execution, but with brighter colors and sharper edges." The Tinnitist agreed with this more technically focused direction in saying that the album "is an undeniable affirmation of their status not just as forefathers of a movement, but as champions of volcanic energy and pure riff worship."

Distorted Sound went into how the album "is a balanced blend of spacey, psychedelia atmospherics and earthy stoner riffs" and how lead guitarist Holappa "has put more melodic riff and solo playing into his parts both in the fuzzy sections and the psychedelic sections. It gives Dozer more of a hybrid sound while still maintaining their original ethos, attitude and style."

== Track listing ==
No.	Title	Length
1.	"Mutation/Transformation"	7:31
2.	"Ex-Human, Now Beast"	4:29
3.	"Dust for Blood"	4:41
4.	"Andromeda"	5:13
5.	"No Quarter Expected, No Quarter Given"	5:32
6.	"Run, Mortals, Run!"	6:44
7.	"Missing 13"	8:34
Total length:		42:47

== Personnel ==
Credits adapted from the album's liner notes.

Dozer

- Fredrik Nordin – vocals, rhythm guitar
- Tommi Holappa – lead guitar
- Johan Rockner – bass
- Sebastian Olsson – drums

Production

- Produced by Dozer and Karl Daniel Lidén
- Recorded at Studio Gröndahl, Stockholm and Deacon Street Studio, Borlänge
- Engineered, Mixed and Mastered by Karl Daniel Lidén
- All songs by Dozer
- All Lyrics by Fredrik Nordin

Artwork

- Illustrations by Johnny Dombrowski
- Artwork & layout by Peder Bergstrand
- Band photo by Mats Ek
