= Demon Cleaner (band) =

Swedish stoner rock band

- Origin: Borlänge, Sweden
- Genre: Stoner rock
- Label: Molten Universe
- Past members: Daniel Lidén; Daniel Söderholm; Kimmo Holappa; Martin Stangefelt; Daniel Jansson; Snicken; Ville Astrand

Demon Cleaner was a Swedish stoner rock band formed in the late 1990s as an instrumental trio by Kimmo Holappa, Martin Stangefelt and Daniel Lidén. They named the band after a Kyuss song. Daniel Söderholm joined as singer soon after and after a few split singles with Dozer they recorded their first full-length album, The Freeflight, which was released in 2000. Söderholm left soon after the recording. Stangefelt took over vocals and Snicken and Ville Astrand joined the band. Daniel Jansson soon took over at bass from Astrand.

Their second album Demon Cleaner was released in 2002. Daniel Lidén left after its release and the band broke up after a last tour with Mr Pillow on drums.

After Demon Cleaner broke up Daniel Lidén joined Dozer while Daniel Jansson and Snicken created Stonewall Noise Orchestra. Daniel Lidén and Daniel Jansson were also members of Greenleaf.

== Members ==
Early members

- Daniel Lidén – drums
- Kimmo Holappa – guitar
- Martin Stangefelt – bass, vocals
- Daniel Söderholm – vocals, guitar (left after The Freeflight)

Later members

- Daniel Jansson – bass on Demon Cleaner
- Rickard "Snicken" Ny – guitar on Demon Cleaner
- Ville Astrand – bass (live)
- Mr Pillow – drums (live)

== Discography ==
Split singles with Dozer

- Demon Cleaner vs Dozer (1998) – Molten Universe (Single of the Week in the 707th issue of Kerrang!)
- Hawaiian Cottage (1999) – Molten Universe
- Domestic Dudes (1999) – Molten Universe

Albums

- The Freeflight (2000) – Molten Universe
- Demon Cleaner (2002) – Molten Universe

Compilations

- A Fist Full of Freebird (1998) – Freebird Records
- Welcome to MeteorCity (1998) – MeteorCity
- Molten Universe Volume One – Molten Universe
- Graven Images, a Tribute to the Misfits (1999) – Freebird Records
- Molten Universe Volume Two – Molten Universe
