= The Cancer Pledge =

Studio album by October Tide
- Released: 6 October 2023
- Recorded: 2023
- Genre: Death-doom; death metal; melodic death metal
- Length: 46:07
- Label: Agonia
- Producer: Daniel Lidén

October Tide chronology
In Splendor Below (2019)	The Cancer Pledge (2023)

The Cancer Pledge is the seventh studio album by Swedish death-doom band October Tide. It was released on 6 October 2023. The Cancer Pledge was recorded and produced by Daniel Lidén, and released by Agonia Records.

== Track listing ==
No.	Title	Length
1.	"Peaceful, Quiet, Safe"	6:13
2.	"Tapestry of Our End"	5:27
3.	"Unprecedented Aggression"	5:13
4.	"Blodfattig" ("Anemic")	6:45
5.	"The Cancer Pledge"	5:09
6.	"I Know Why I'm Cold"	6:22
7.	"Season of Arson"	5:57
8.	"Breathe the Water"	5:01
Total length:		46:07

== Personnel ==
=== October Tide ===
- Fred "North" Norrman – guitar
- Jonas Sköld – drums
- Mattias "Kryptan" Norrman – guitar
- Johan Jönsegård – bass
- Alexander Högbom – vocals

=== Additional personnel ===
- Albin Högbom – artwork
- Daniel Jansson – photography
- Daniel Lidén – production, recording, mixing, mastering
- Ra.Design – layout design
