= Madre de Dios (album) =

Studio album by Dozer
- Released: March 6, 2001
- Recorded: March 2000, August 2000, and December 2000
- Studios: Rockhouse Studio, Borlänge, Sweden
- Genre: Stoner metal
- Length: 39:37
- Labels: Man's Ruin; Molten Universe; Heavy Psych Sounds
- Producers: Dozer and Bengt Backe

Dozer chronology
In the Tail of a Comet (2000)	Madre de Dios (2001)	Call It Conspiracy (2003)

Alternative cover
- Cover artwork used for vinyl edition

Madre de Dios is the second studio album by the Swedish stoner rock band Dozer, released on March 6, 2001 through Man's Ruin Records. All songs were recorded in March 2000 at the Rockhouse Studio in Borlänge, Sweden, except "Octanoid" which was recorded in August 2000. "Rings of Saturn" was recorded in December 2000. All songs were mixed and produced by Dozer with Bengt Backe.

== Background ==
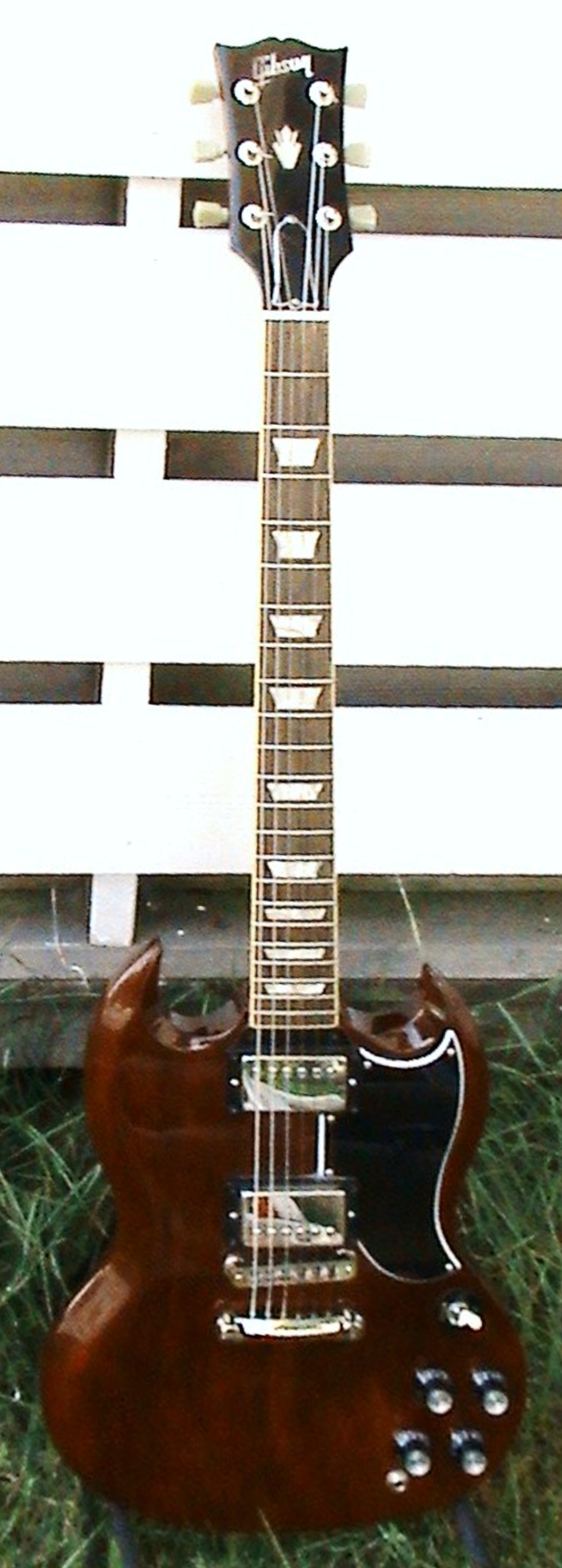
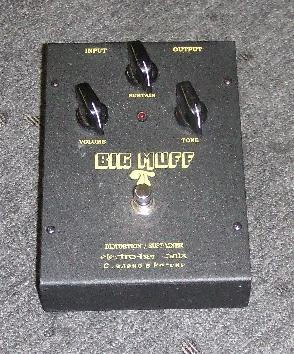
The Gibson SG and Big Muff fuzz helped define the sound of the album.

Explaining the linguistic structure of the album AllMusic stated Dozer is Swedish, writes in English, and titled the album in Spanish. The band was inspired to name it after watching the "Separate Vocations" episode of The Simpsons in which the character Bart exclaims, "Madre de Dios! The legends were true!" after viewing a secret room full of confiscated toys in his school.

The distinctive guitar tones of the album not heard on the band's previous albums included the use of a newly acquired Gibson SG guitar and a Russian Big Muff fuzz pedal. Guitar World described the Big Muff as a "blown-out, bass-heavy fuzz" and in regard to the Russian variations in particular "each sounds very different to the connoisseur, but there's a general trend towards fuller bass and a thicker low-mid." The Gibson SG itself has a long history of being used in conjunction with fuzz distortion starting in 1962 when the company acquired the design and started the production of "the first commercial fuzz pedal "Maestro FZ-1 Fuzz-Tone"". They then took it a step forward installing a built-in version of it in the EBSF-1250 variants of the SG model.

Commenting on the recording techniques of the album the magazine laut.de said, "The work is completely self-produced and may therefore appear a little sloppy, but this guarantees a lot of vintage flair" giving an example of this with the prog sounding synth intro on "Let The Shit Roll". Due to the tonal characteristics of the vintage instruments and amplification used the review by Skrutt said it produced a sound that was more rock and roll rather than heavy metal or pure stoner rock in classification.

In an interview about the recording of the album lead guitarist/songwriter Tommi Holappa revealed that the original record label Mans Ruin released only a CD version. The band released a vinyl edition on Molten Universe Records which included using different artwork. The final track "Rings Of Saturn" was only released on the original vinyl version of the album as a bonus track. The album was reissued by Heavy Psych Sounds Records in 2020 on vinyl LP with the alternate cover artwork that was used for the original Molten Universe Records vinyl release in 2001. They also reissued the CD version with the original CD cover artwork.

== Critical reception ==
Professional ratings
Review scores
Source	Rating
AllMusic	3/5 stars
Core and Co	7.95/10
Ever Metal	9/10
Laut.de	4/5 stars
Metal Temple	8/10
Rock Hard	8/10
Svenska Dagbladet	3/6 stars
Visions	6/12

In the book Desperate Measures: Posters Prints and More, Frank Kozik described the thematic and sonic context of the album with the statement, "Swirling Galaxies of star dust slowly unfurl to reveal thundering riffs of deepest space." AllMusic acknowledged the writing to be "slightly stronger" than its predecessor In the Tail of a Comet and expressed that, "although the songs are loud, heavy, and forceful ... they're also melodic." The reviewer observed that this resulted from the band combining the pentatonic blues based lead guitar of 1970's proto-metal pioneers with early 1980's punk influenced thrash metal rhythm parts. Madre de Dios is evident that "Dozer holds melody and heaviness in equally high regard." In critique of the band's second LP Groove noted the bands talent and singled out the track "Early Grace" as the mixtape track of the summer with all the songs maintaining a consistent "sweet smelling soundscape" with "vaguely murky riffs."

Visions magazine gave the album a classification as being rooted in the "stoner" genre with standout tracks like "TX-9" which displayed examples of the band's "doomy grandeur and psychedelic nuances" and "Freeloader" with its Palm Desert Scene inspired vocal lines from lead singer/guitarist Fredrik Nordin. Rock Hard drew melodic vocal parallels to traits of both John Garcia and Josh Homme.

Further developing on the band's punk infused desert rock sound reviewers of the reissue version showed how they began "to reveal more textures and experiments" with the instrumental track "Earth Yeti" mixing a "psychedelic sound with heavy and light passages" featuring Johan Rockner's wah effect drenched bass playing and layers of exotic percussion from the drumming duo consisting of Erik Bäckwall and Daniel Lidén.

== Track listing ==
No.	Title	Length
1.	"Let The Shit Roll"	2:43
2.	"Freeloader"	4:15
3.	"Soulshigh"	4:21
4.	"Octanoid"	3:28
5.	"Earth Yeti"	3:24
6.	"Full Circle"	4:59
7.	"Mono Impact"	2:29
8.	"Early Grace"	4:49
9.	"TX-9"	5:38
10.	"Thunderbolt"	3:28
Total length:		39:37

== Original vinyl track listing ==
All tracks are written by Dozer

Side one
No.	Title	Length
1.	"Let The Shit Roll"	2:43
2.	"Freeloader"	4:15
3.	"Soulshigh"	4:21
4.	"Octanoid"	3:28
5.	"Earth Yeti"	3:24
6.	"Full Circle"	4:59
Total length:		23:10

Side two
No.	Title	Length
1.	"Mono Impact"	2:29
2.	"Early Grace"	4:49
3.	"TX-9"	5:38
4.	"Thunderbolt"	3:28
5.	"Rings of Saturn"	5:59
Total length:		22:23 45:33

== Personnel ==
Credits are taken from the album's sleeve.

=== Dozer ===
- Fredrik Nordin (vocals, Rhythm Guitar)
- Tommi Holappa (Lead Guitar)
- Johan Rockner (Bass guitar)
- Erik Bäckwall (drums)

=== Additional musicians ===
- Daniel Lidén (Congas on "Earth Yeti")

=== Technical personnel ===
- Engineered by Bengt Bäcke.
- Mixed by Dozer and Bengt Bäcke.
- Mastered by Claes Persson at CRP Recordings, Stockholm.
- "Earth Yeti" mastered by Andreas Eriksson
- Cover Design by Martin Stangefelt
