= A.D. (album) =

Studio album by Solace
- Released: 2010
- Genre: Stoner metal
- Length: 59:09
- Label: Small Stone Records, Land o' Smiles
- Producer: Tommy Southard, Justin Daniels, Benny Grotto, Jason, Justin Seitz

Solace chronology
The Black Black (2007)	A.D. (2010)

A.D. is the sixth studio recording and third LP by American heavy metal band Solace. Referred to as "captivating from the first note" and "a defining moment in underground heaviness", A.D. was recorded at New Jersey's Trax East Studios, Mad Oak Studios in Allston, Massachusetts, and Semaphore Studio in Chicago, Illinois, over the course of four years.

== Reception ==
Professional ratings
Review scores
Source	Rating
AllMusic	4/5 stars

AllMusic reviewer Eduardo Rivadavia awarded the album four stars, stating:

"All kidding aside, "intense" is another word that comes immediately to mind in view of raging album openers "The Disillusioned Prophet" and "The Immortal, The Dead, and The Nothing," which, along with subsequent speedsters "Down South Dog" and weirdly named "The Skull of the Head of a Man" (a full-on hardcore detour!), reflect the urgency of a band making up for lost time. But the slower tempos typical of Solace's albums past still crop up here as well, via the doom-laden grooves guiding tracks like "Borrowed Immunity," "The Eyes of the Vulture," "From Below," and "Six-Year Trainwreck," the latter of which eventually achieves yet another trashing finale. In light of all this furious metallic mayhem, the bluesy "Za Gamman" really helps lighten the mood some, but if there's a single common thread to A.D. it's that it's a guitar album through and through—even by the standards of this genre. All the remaining musicians can do is hang on for dear life in the thick of Southard's and Justin Daniels' six-string maelstrom, including singer Jason, who occasionally sounds a little buried in the overall mix, but it's hard to imagine too many Solace fans crying foul over this. Heck, after waiting seven years for A.D., they should be crying tears of joy, exclusively, especially since Solace delivered the goods when all was said and done."

== Track listing ==
All tracks written by Solace.

1. "The Disillusioned Prophet" – 7:02
2. "The Immortal, the Dead and the Nothing" – 6:22
3. "Six-Year Trainwreck" – 7:26
4. "Za Gamman" – 5:12
5. "Borrowed Immunity" – 5:41
6. "Down South Dog" – 8:01
7. "The Eyes of the Vulture" – 6:47
8. "The Skull of the Head of a Man" – 2:46
9. "From Below" – 9:52

== Awards and accolades ==
A.D. was given Best Metal Album of the Year awards by many prestigious organizations and websites, including iTunes.

== Personnel ==
- Tommy Southard – guitar
- Justin Daniels – guitar
- Jason – vocals
- Rob Hultz – bass
- Kenny Lund – drums
