= Tunnel of No Light =

Studio album by October Tide
- Released: 25 March 2013
- Recorded: May–October 2012
- Studio: Black Lounge Studio, Avesta, Sweden
- Genre: Death-doom
- Length: 51:43
- Label: Pulverised

October Tide chronology
A Thin Shell (2010)	Tunnel of No Light (2013)	Winged Waltz (2016)

Tunnel of No Light is the fourth studio album by Swedish death-doom band October Tide. It was released on 25 March 2013. Tunnel of No Light was produced by Jonas Kjellgren, and released by Pulverised Records, with whom the band had recently signed. It was the first album with an official second guitarist, Emil Alstermark, and the first album with an official bass guitarist, Mattias "Kryptan" Norrman. It is also the first album with Alexander Högbom on vocals. The sound of the new album is described as being a more direct and more heavy direction while maintaining the traditional sound of the band.

== Track listing ==
All lyrics are written by Laurence Jonathan, Jonas Renkse, and Mattias Back; all music is composed by Fred "North" Norrman unless noted otherwise

No.	Title	Length
1.	"Of Wounds to Come"	6:27
2.	"Our Constellation"	8:38
3.	"Emptiness Fulfilled" (Emil Alstermark)	6:58
4.	"Caught in Silence"	4:46
5.	"The Day I Dissolved"	5:20
6.	"Watching the Drowners"	4:59
7.	"In Hopeless Pursuit"	7:38
8.	"Adoring Ashes"	7:02
Total length:		51:43

== Personnel ==
=== October Tide ===
- Fred "North" Norrman – guitar
- Robin Bergh – drums
- Emil Alstermark – guitar
- Mattias "Kryptan" Norrman – bass
- Alexander Högbom – vocals

=== Additional personnel ===
- Johannes Nordqvist Högbom – artwork
- Kontamination Design – layout design
