= 13 (Solace album) =

Studio album by Solace
- Released: 2003
- Genre: Stoner metal, doom metal
- Label: MeteorCity, Listenable
- Producer: Eric Rachel, Tommy Southard

Solace chronology
Further (2000)	13 (2003)	Hammerhead (2004)

Professional ratings
Review scores
Source	Rating
AllMusic	4/5 stars
Lollipop Magazine	(very favorable)

13 is the second album by American heavy metal band Solace. Considered heavier, angrier and musically more aggressive than its predecessor Further, 13 continued to raise Solace above their stoner rock stereotype with its heavy metal and doom metal influences, this time with help from Scott "Wino" Weinrich (The Obsessed, Saint Vitus, Spirit Caravan). With comparisons made between 13 and albums from heavy bands Black Sabbath and Led Zeppelin, Solace was dubbed "one of the freshest sounds the metal scene has ever cultivated".

13 was released in 2003 on both CD and vinyl; the CD version contained 13 tracks, while the vinyl version featured two additional songs. The cover art was supplied by artist, fan and friend of Solace, Paul Vismara. It took Solace three years to complete the album.

== Title ==
13's title was derived from the bad luck the band felt they endured during the production of this album. Problems included:

- The need for four different drummers to complete the album.
- Internal strife due to supposed splits with vocalist Jason.
- The destruction of the album's original master tapes prior to their completion.

== Track listing ==
1. "Loving Sickness/Burning Fuel" – 6:44
2. "Indolence" – 4:07
3. "King Alcohol" – 5:41
4. "Once Around the Sun (Deep Through Time)" – 7:12
5. "Common Cause" – 4:16
6. "In the Oven" – 3:18
7. "Forever My Queen" (Pentagram cover) – 2:38
8. "Theme..." – 1:31
9. "Try" – 6:14
10. "Sled Heavy" – 3:25
11. "Rice Burner" – 7:23
12. "With Time" (Agnostic Front cover) – 2:23
13. "Untitled" – 9:42 (Track 13 is a hidden track not referred to on the album's liner notes. It is silent for 5:15, after which the music begins. While this track is commonly referred to by fans as "Untitled", it has been identified by Solace as actually being named "Shit Kisser". The song originally appeared on the band's demo in 1997.)

=== European vinyl edition ===
(Has different running order of the tracks, "Untitled" is mentioned as "Shit Kisser" and spins without the silence in the beginning.)

1. A1 "Loving Sickness/Burning Fuel" – 6:44
2. A2 "Indolence" – 4:07
3. A3 "King Alcohol" – 5:41
4. A4 "Forever My Queen" (Pentagram cover) – 2:38
5. B1 "Once Around the Sun (Deep Through Time)" – 7:12
6. B2 "Common Cause" – 4:16
7. B3 "In the Oven" – 3:18
8. B4 "With Time" (Agnostic Front cover) – 2:23
9. C1 "Sled Heavy" – 3:25
10. C2 "Theme..." – 1:31
11. C3 "Try" – 6:14
12. C4 "Rice Burner" – 7:23
13. D1 "Burn" – 6:02
14. D2 "Red 5/Failing Through" – 7:28
15. D3 "Shit Kisser" – 4:53

=== Vinyl edition ===
1. "Loving Sickness/Burning Fuel" – 6:44
2. "Indolence" – 4:07
3. "King Alcohol" – 5:41
4. "Once Around the Sun (Deep Through Time)" – 7:12
5. "Common Cause" – 4:16
6. "In the Oven" – 3:18
7. "Forever My Queen" (Pentagram cover) – 2:38
8. "Theme..." – 1:31
9. "Try" – 6:14
10. "Sled Heavy" – 3:25
11. "Rice Burner" – 7:23
12. "With Time" (Agnostic Front cover) – 2:23
13. "Untitled" – 9:42 (see note on CD version)
14. "Burn"
15. "Red 5/Failing Through"

The lyrics to the original songs on this album have never been officially released. It is commonly believed that their intensely personal nature prevents vocalist Jason from allowing their publication.

The song "Once Around the Sun (Deep Through Time)" has an introduction that features dialogue from the 1962 film The Creation of the Humanoids.

== Personnel ==
- Tommy Southard – guitars, production
- Jason – vocals, lyrics
- Rob Hultz – bass
- John Proveaux – drums
- Scott Weinrich – lyrics, vocals ("Common Cause"), guitar ("Common Cause", "Indolence")
- Rick Lewis – keyboards ("Indolence")
- Mad Lee – harmonica ("Loving Sickness/Burning Fuel")
- Keith Ackerman – drums ("King Alcohol", "Sled Heavy")
- Bill "Bixby" Belford – drums ("Loving Sickness/Burning Fuel")
- Matt Gunvordahl – drums ("Try")
- Eric Rachel – recording, production, mixing
- Charlie Schaefer – recording
