= Winged Waltz =

Studio album by October Tide
- Released: 22 April 2016
- Recorded: 2015
- Studio: Wing Studios, Stockholm, Sweden
- Genre: Death-doom; melodic death metal
- Length: 50:30
- Label: Agonia
- Producer: Sverker Widgren

October Tide chronology
Tunnel of No Light (2013)	Winged Waltz (2016)	In Splendor Below (2019)

Winged Waltz is the fifth studio album by Swedish death-doom band October Tide. It was released on 22 April 2016. Winged Waltz was produced by Sverker Widgren, and released by Agonia Records. It is the band's only album with drummer Jocke Wallgren, who would later join Amon Amarth.

== Track listing ==
All lyrics are written by Laurence Jonathan (tracks 1, 2, 3, 6, 7), Mattias Back (tracks 4, 5), and Juha Raivio (track 8); all music is composed by Fred "North" Norrman

No.	Title	Length
1.	"Swarm"	7:10
2.	"Sleepless Sun"	6:10
3.	"Reckless Abandon"	6:36
4.	"A Question Ignite"	5:13
5.	"Nursed by the Cold"	4:33
6.	"Lost in Rapture"	5:45
7.	"Perilous"	6:38
8.	"Coffins of November"	8:25
Total length:		50:30

== Personnel ==
=== October Tide ===
- Fred "North" Norrman – guitar
- Jocke Wallgren – drums
- Emil Alstermark – guitar
- Mattias "Kryptan" Norrman – bass
- Alexander Högbom – vocals

=== Additional personnel ===
- Albin Högbom – artwork
- Sverker Widgren – production, recording, mixing, mastering
- Perversor – layout design
