= Grey Dawn (album) =

Studio album by October Tide
- Released: 23 November 1999
- Recorded: 1998
- Studio: Studio Underground
- Genre: Death-doom
- Length: 39:56
- Label: Avantgarde Music
- Producer: October Tide

October Tide chronology
| Rain Without End (1997) | Grey Dawn (1999) | A Thin Shell (2010) |

Professional ratings
Review scores
| Source | Rating |
|---|---|
| Allmusic | 2.5/5 stars |

Grey Dawn is the second studio album by Swedish death-doom band October Tide. This is the only October Tide release with Mårten Hansen in the band, and the last with Jonas Renkse. The album was released on 23 November 1999.

== Track listing ==
All music composed by October Tide.

| No. | Title | Length |
|---|---|---|
| 1. | "Grey Dawn" | 4:28 |
| 2. | "October Insight" | 5:03 |
| 3. | "Sweetness Dies" | 5:45 |
| 4. | "Heart of the Dead" | 4:16 |
| 5. | "Floating" | 6:14 |
| 6. | "Lost in the Dark (And Then Gone)" | 5:25 |
| 7. | "Into Deep Sleep" | 5:13 |
| 8. | "Dear Sun" | 3:32 |
| Total length: | | 39:56 |

== Personnel ==
- Mårten Hansen – vocals
- Fred Norrman – guitar, bass guitar
- Jonas Renkse – drums, guitar
