= Hammerhead (EP) =

EP by Solace
- Released: 2006
- Genre: Stoner metal, doom metal
- Label: Land o' Smiles
- Producer: Solace

Solace chronology
Hammerhead Split (2004)	Hammerhead (2006)	The Black Black (2007)

Hammerhead is Solace's half of 2004's Blackmarket/Hammerhead split EP, re-released in 2006 on limited edition 10 inch vinyl.

Recorded at New Alliance Studios in Boston, MA, Hammerhead found Solace "experimenting with some new styles to nice effect". Two cover songs – a title track originally by Rare Bird and Link Wray's Rumble – were described as "bombastic", "on fire", and sounding "like some New Wave of British Heavy Metal classic". An original track ("Cement Stitches") harkens back to Solace's Punk and Hardcore roots with "cool harmonic breakdowns" and vocals "that can go from a solemn Ian Curtis baritone to a wailing Chris Cornell banshee shriek".

This album's cover art was done by Solace friend and repeat cover-artist Paul Vismara. Originally released as half of a split EP with Albany, NY's Greatdayforup. This release was limited to 500 copies.

== Track listing ==
=== Side one ===
1. "Hammerhead"
2. "Cement Stitches"

=== Side two ===
1. "Rumble"

Lyrics to "Cement Stitches" have never been officially released. It is commonly believed that the intensely personal nature of vocalist Jason's lyrics prevent him from allowing their publication.

== Lineup ==
- Tommy Southard: Guitars
- Justin Daniels: Guitars
- Jason: Vocals, Lyrics
- Rob Hultz: Bass
- Kenny Lund: Drums
