= Beyond Colossal =

Studio album by Dozer
- Released: September 27, 2008 (iTunes); November 11, 2008
- Recorded: April–May 2008
- Studios: Studios 301 (Stockholm), Rockhouse (Borlänge)
- Genre: Stoner metal
- Length: 44:06
- Label: Small Stone Records
- Producers: Tommi Holappa, Fredrik Nordin, Karl Daniel Lidén

Dozer chronology
Through The Eyes Of Heathens (2005)	Beyond Colossal (2008)	Drifting in the Endless Void (2023)

Professional ratings
Review scores
Source	Rating
AllMusic	3.5/5 stars

Beyond Colossal is the fifth studio album by the Swedish stoner rock band Dozer. It was recorded at Studios 301, Stockholm and Rockhouse Studios, Borlänge. The record was mixed at Tri-Lamb Studios by their former drummer Karl Daniel Lidén. Beyond Colossal was released on Small Stone Records.

== Track listing ==
All tracks are written by Dozer.

No.	Title	Length
1.	"The Flood"	3:51
2.	"Exoskeleton, Pt. II"	6:34
3.	"Empire's End"	3:55
4.	"The Ventriloquist"	4:56
5.	"Grand Inquisitor"	4:12
6.	"Message Through the Horses"	3:01
7.	"The Throne"	3:25
8.	"Fire for Crows"	3:58
9.	"Two Coins for Eyes"	6:51
10.	"Bound for Greatness"	3:29
Total length:		44:06

== Personnel ==
- Fredrik Nordin – vocals, guitar
- Tommi Holappa – lead guitar
- Johan Rockner – bass
- Olle Mårthans – drums

=== Guests ===
- Additional vocals on "Empire's End" and "Two coins for eyes" by Neil Fallon.
- Hammond Organ on "Bound for Greatness" by Jocke.

=== Artist ===
Artwork and album design done by Nathan Lavertue.
