= Through the Eyes of Heathens =

Studio album by Dozer
- Released: January 24, 2006
- Genre: Stoner metal
- Length: 44:23
- Label: Small Stone Records
- Producer: Dozer

Dozer chronology
Call It Conspiracy (2003)	Through the Eyes of Heathens (2006)	Beyond Colossal (2008)

Professional ratings
Review scores
Source	Rating
AllMusic	4/5 stars

Through The Eyes Of Heathens is the fourth studio album by the Swedish stoner rock band Dozer. It was recorded at the Seawolf Studios in Helsinki. The album was released on Small Stone Records with whom they had signed on to earlier that year. The album includes the track "Until Man Exists No More" which features guest vocals by Troy Sanders of Mastodon.

== Track listing ==
No.	Title	Length
1.	"Drawing Dead"	4:38
2.	"Born a Legend"	3:24
3.	"From Fire Fell"	2:39
4.	"Until Man Exists No More"	5:08
5.	"Days of Future Past"	3:45
6.	"Omega Glory"	5:00
7.	"Blood Undone"	4:44
8.	"The Roof, The River, The Revolver"	3:07
9.	"Man of Fire"	3:16
10.	"Big Sky Theory"	8:28
Total length:		44:23

== Personnel ==
- Fredrik Nordin – vocals, rhythm guitar
- Tommi Holappa – lead guitar
- Johan Rockner – bass
- Daniel Lidén – drums, percussion, piano, organ
- Mikko Poikolainen – engineering, mixing, mastering
- Mikko Majanen – engineering
- Peder Bergstrand – artwork, sleeve
- Martin Stangefelt – management
- Troy Sanders – additional vocals (track 4)
