= October Tide =

Swedish death-doom band

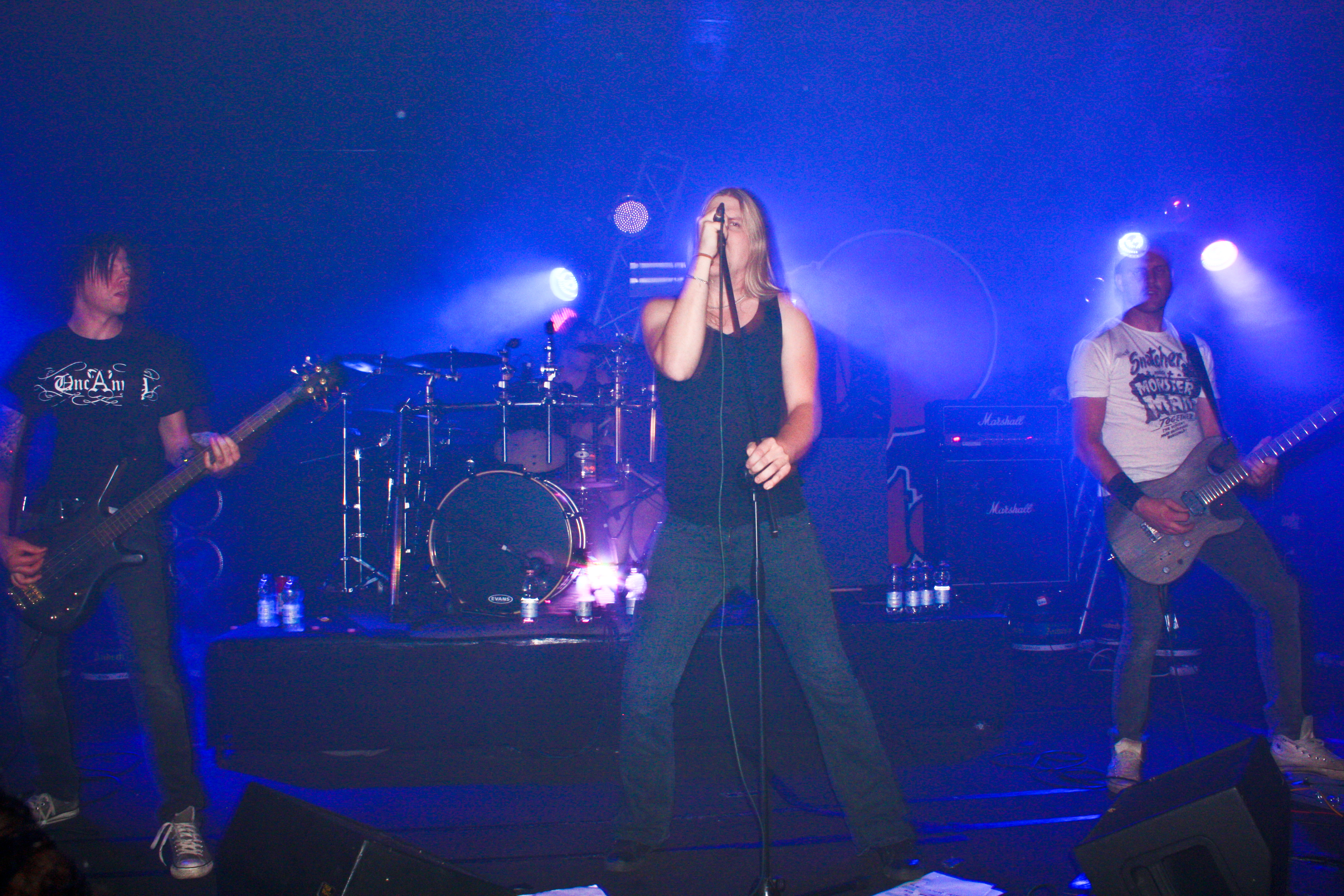
- October Tide in 2011

Background information
- Origin: Stockholm, Sweden
- Genres: Death-doom, melodic death metal
- Years active: 1994–1999, 2009–present
- Labels: Vic, Avantgarde, Pulverised, Agonia
- Spinoff of: Katatonia
- Members: Fred Norrman; Johan Jönsegård; Jonas Sköld; Mattias "Kryptan" Norrman; Alexander Högbom
- Past members: Jonas Renkse; Mårten Hansen; Tobias Netzell; Pierre Stam; Emil Alstermark; Joakim Wallgren
- Website: octobertide.net

October Tide is a Swedish death-doom band formed in 1994 by Katatonia vocalist Jonas Renkse and guitarist Fred Norrman. Norrman revived the band after leaving Katatonia in 2009.

== History ==
=== 1995–1999 ===
October Tide's debut album, Rain Without End, was recorded in 1995 and released on Vic Records in 1997. During this period, October Tide kept a low profile, without touring or giving interviews. October Tide disbanded after releasing their second album, Grey Dawn, in 1999.

=== 2009–2011 ===
After leaving Katatonia, Norrman reformed October Tide in early 2009. The new line-up didn't include Renske but instead consisted of Norrman on guitars, singer Tobias Netzell from In Mourning, drummer Robin Bergh, and session bassist Jonas Kjellgren. The band entered the studio to record a new album. October Tide signed to Candlelight Records in March 2010.

In July 2010, October Tide performed at Hell's Pleasure Metalfest. Bassist Johan Jansson replaced Kjellgren for the show.

A Thin Shell was released on 28 September 2010. After the album's release, bass player Pierre Stam joined the band.

=== 2012–present ===
In March 2012, Netzell and Stam left the band and were replaced with Alexander Högbom and Mattias Norrman, respectively. October Tide signed with Pulverised Records in April 2012. The band entered Black Lounge Studios in late 2012 to record the album Tunnel of No Light, released on 25 March 2013.

In 2015, drummer Robin Bergh was replaced with Jocke Wallgren. In Splendor Below was released on 17 May 2019.

== Members ==
=== Current members ===
- Fred Norrman – guitar (1994–1999; 2009–present), bass (1994–1999)
- Mattias "Kryptan" Norrman – guitar (2016–present), bass (2011–2016)
- Alexander Högbom – vocals (2012–present)
- Johan Jönsegård – bass (2016–present)
- Jonas Sköld – drums (2016–present)

=== Past members ===
- Jonas Renkse – vocals (1994–1998), drums, guitar (1994–1999)
- Mårten Hansen – vocals (1998–1999)
- Robin Bergh – drums (2009–2014)
- Tobias Netzell – vocals (2009–2012)
- Emil Alstermark – guitar (2010–2016)
- Johan "Jonken" Jansson – live bass (2010)
- Pierre Stam – bass (2010–2012)
- Jocke Wallgren – drums (2014–2016)

== Discography ==
=== Demo ===
- Promo Tape (1995)

=== Albums ===
- Rain Without End (1997 – Vic Records, 2008 – reissued with new artwork)
- Grey Dawn (1999 – Avantgarde Music, 2007 – reissued by Peaceville Records)
- A Thin Shell (2010 – Candlelight Records)
- Tunnel of No Light (2013 – Pulverised Records)
- Winged Waltz (2016 – Agonia Records)
- In Splendor Below (2019 – Agonia Records)
- The Cancer Pledge (2023 – Agonia Records)
