= Solace (band) =

American stoner metal band

- Origin: New Jersey, U.S.
- Genres: Stoner metal, doom metal
- Years active: 1996–2011, 2012–present
- Labels: MeteorCity, Blues Funeral, Small Stone
- Members: Tommy Southard; Justin Daniels; Justin Goins; Tim Schoenleber; Mike Sica
- Past members: Rob Hultz; Jason Limpantsis; Keith Ackerman; John Proveaux; Bill Belford; Matt Gunvordahl; Duane Hutter; Kenny Lund
- Website: facebook.com/SolaceBand

Solace is an American stoner metal band from Asbury Park, New Jersey, formed in 1996 by the remaining members of Atlantic Records artist Godspeed. They have released four full-length studio albums. iTunes.com voted the band's third album A.D. "2010 Metal Album of the Year".

== Career ==
=== Early history ===
Tommy Southard and Rob Hultz had previously been in the metal band Godspeed, which disbanded after one album in 1994. Following stints as lead guitarist for both Sugartooth and Slap Rocket, Southard reformed the band in 1996 with Hultz and former Glueneck singer Jason Limpantsis, naming the revamped outfit Solace. After a 1997 demo, Solace released their self-titled 7-inch debut in 1998, followed by 1999's Distanced from Reality EP, a split with fellow New Jerseyans Solarized.

Soon afterwards, the band released its debut LP, 2000's Further. A cover by metal art veteran Wes Benscoter (Slayer's Divine Intervention) hinted at darkness within the album, which was quickly considered a departure from the stoner rock pigeon-hole the band had already been put into.

=== 13 and beyond ===
In 2003, the band released the follow-up to Further, its second album 13. Artist, fan, and friend of Solace Paul Vismara created the album's cover. Considered by some to be musically superior to its predecessor, 13 helped Solace further define themselves as more than simply stoner rock, assisted by the vocals and guitar work of doom metal guitarist Scott Weinrich on the track "Common Cause".

Soon after the release of 13, the song "Indolence" was used on the soundtrack of the popular video game Tony Hawk's Underground. 2003 also saw the band tweak their line-up with former Lethal Aggression drummer Kenny Lund and the addition of another lead guitarist Justin Daniels. With this new line-up, they entered the studio once again in 2004 to record Black Market/Hammerhead, a split EP with Albany, New York's Greatdayforup.

Solace's half of this split EP was re-released on vinyl in 2006. In April of that year, Solace headed to Europe for Holland's Roadburn Festival. Upon their return, they strengthened their resolve further toward a new release. The band went into the studio to finish their third album A.D. in time for their Summer 2007 European tour with British doomsters Orange Goblin, only to realize that their creation was simply too vast for a single album. Four tracks were selected for release as The Black Black, which was completed and pressed to coincide with the European tour.

On the heels of that successful tour, they were signed to independent label Small Stone Records, after which they were asked by friends Orange Goblin to play their annual Christmas show in London. Solace's set was capped by band friend and fellow New Jerseyan Ed Mundell of Monster Magnet joining them onstage for their cover of Pentagram's "Forever My Queen".

2008 saw an interesting turn of events for Solace – drummer Kenny Lund took his leave to follow business pursuits and other projects. This, while being a seemingly negative turn of events, had in actuality quite a positive effect – it opened the door for Solace's original drummer Keith Ackerman to rejoin the band. Guitarist Daniels has stated: "This is the band's most dynamic lineup to date".

The band used this momentum to continue their upswing throughout 2009, completing their third studio LP A.D.. The album was released to critical acclaim in Spring 2010 and received such honors as "Album of the Year" at The Obelisk, and was voted by iTunes "Best Metal Album of 2010". The band finished out the year touring Europe with Orange Goblin and once again playing their annual Christmas show.

=== Bad luck ===
From early in their career, Solace has been faced with almost mysterious problems. The band had an estimated eight different drummers between 1996 and 2003 and suffered through supposed splits with vocalist Jason. Even seemingly random accidents — one resulting in the destruction of the original master tapes to their second album 13 — vexed the band.

This curse seemed to be lifted at least somewhat in 2003, but returned only a year later when drummer Kenny Lund was diagnosed with cancer. All of the band's plans were halted, including a new recording contract with independent label Century Media. This setback did not stop them from returning to the studio once Lund recovered in 2005 to begin work on tracks for A.D. Later that year, the band faced yet another hurdle — this time in the form of undisclosed personal problems and were forced to cancel a coast-to-coast US tour.

Solace continued sporadic work on A.D. up to its critically acclaimed release in 2010, only to announce in June 2011 via their official Facebook page that they were "closed for business" and that they "may or may not re-open". However, as soon as 2012, the band cited they were active again.

=== Solace today ===
In 2015, Solace reorganized and solidified their lineup once again, most shockingly with the official replacement of reclusive and eccentric vocalist Jason by Justin Goins of The Brimstones. Solace entered the recording studio for the first time in over five years with this new lineup, recording a cover of Black Sabbath's "Electric Funeral" for Deadline Music's Sweet Leaf: A Tribute to Black Sabbath. Shortly thereafter, they released a cassette single featuring this cover as well as a new original song, "Bird of Ill Omen," which was described as having "characteristic intensity, volume, and unbridled rhythmic force".

In 2018, Solace were working on their first album since 2010's A.D., tentatively titled Broken Bodies & Suffering Spirits.

By 2019, Solace had finished the recording of the new record and has changed the title from Broken Bodies & Suffering Spirits. to The Brink. They are currently waiting for studio time to finish the mixing of the record and the album will be released later this year on Blues Funeral Recordings. The Brink was released in December 2019.

== Musical style ==
Solace is most well known in the stoner rock/metal genre, but as guitarist and founding member Tommy Southard has said "We're not a stoner band, we're a rock 'n' roll band—a hard rock band, a metal band." However, their live performances at stoner rock festivals such as America's Emissions from the Monolith and Europe's Roadburn Festival have rooted them just as deeply in that genre. Decibel described them as stoner doom with influences from the new wave of British heavy metal.

== Members ==
=== Current members ===
- Tommy Southard – guitar (formerly of Prunella Scales, Slap Rocket, Godspeed, Social Decay, Sugartooth, and 3 Input Woman, among others)
- Justin Daniels – guitar
- Justin Goins – vocals, keyboards (formerly of The Brimstones)
- Tim Schoenleber – drums (formerly of Godspeed & Social Decay)
- Mike Sica – bass (currently Johnny Pipe)

=== Former members ===
- Rob Hultz – bass (formerly of Godspeed, Lethal Aggression. Currently of Trouble)
- Jason – vocals (formerly of Glueneck)(deceased 2025)
- Kenny Lund – drums (formerly of Lethal Aggression, Hate Wagon)
- John Proveaux – drums (formerly of Oblivion)
- Bill Belford – drums (formerly of Tow)
- Matt Gunvordahl – drums (formerly of Hogan's Heroes)
- Duane Hutter – bass (formerly of Black Nasa. Currently 40 Pound Hound)

== Discography ==
=== Albums ===
- Solace 7-inch EP (1998, Warpburner Records)
- Distanced from Reality split with Solarized (1999, Freebird Records/MeteorCity)
- Further (2000, MeteorCity) / Vinyl re-issue (2008 Heavy birtH records)
- 13 (2003, MeteorCity/Listenable Records)
- Black Market/Hammerhead split with Greatdayforup (2004, Underdogma Records)
- Hammerhead 10-inch EP (2006, Land o' Smiles Records)
- The Black Black EP (2007, Underdogma Records/Land o' Smiles Records)
- A.D. (2010)
- Bird of Ill Omen Cassette Single (2017, Black Black Records)
- The Brink (2019, Blues Funeral Recordings)

=== Compilations ===
- A Fist Full of Freebird (1998, Freebird Records)
- Stone Deaf Forever (1999, Red Sun Records)
- Judge Not (2000, Underdogma Records)
- Doomed (2000, The Dark Reign Records)
- Where the Bad Boys Rock (2001, People Like You Records)
- The Mighty Desert Rock Avengers (2002, People Like You Records)
- MeteorCity Hellacious 2002 Sampler (2002, MeteorCity)
- Rebirth of the Heavy, Volume 2 (2004, The Music Cartel)
- Burn the Street (2005, Daredevil Records)

=== Tribute albums ===
- Graven Images: A Tribute to The Misfits (1999, Freebird Records)
- Right in the Nuts: A Tribute to Aerosmith (2000, Small Stone Records)
- Slave to the Power: A Tribute to Iron Maiden (2000, MeteorCity)
- Destroysall: A Tribute to Godzilla (2003, Shifty Records)
- Sweet Leaf: A Stoner Rock Salute to Black Sabbath (2015, Deadline Music)

== Videography ==
- "Die Drunk" (2006, Ambrosia Path Productions)
- "Cement Stitches" (2006, Ambrosia Path Productions)
- "Hungry Mother" (2006, Ambrosia Path Productions)
- Solace: The Videos – Volume 1 (2006, Ambrosia Path Productions)
- Solace: Roadburn (2006, Ambrosia Path Productions)

== Other media ==
- "Indolence" (from 13) was used on the soundtrack of Tony Hawk's Underground (2003, Activision)
- "Cement Stitches" and "Rumble" (from Black Market/Hammerhead) were used on the soundtrack of American Skier (DVD) (2004, X Ski Films)
- Various tracks used on the soundtrack of MTV's show Homewrecker
