= Ode to Io =

Studio album by Lowrider
- Released: 19 September 2000
- Recorded: November 1999
- Studio: KM Studios, Karlskoga, Sweden
- Genre: Stoner rock
- Length: 52:36
- Label: Meteor City

Lowrider chronology
Nebula/Lowrider (1999)	Ode to Io (2000)	Refractions (2020)

Reissue cover
- 2020 re-release, Ode to Io Deluxe Edition (Remastered) Blues Funeral version

Professional ratings
Review scores
Source	Rating
AllMusic	4.0/5 stars

Ode to Io is the first full-length album from the Swedish rock band Lowrider, released on Meteor City.

Early reviews noted a similarity to musical elements used by influential rock bands such as Kyuss and Fu Manchu. It developed an increased following after the band went on hiatus in 2003. Lowrider reformed to play Desertfest in 2013 and based upon the positive response of the albums performance led to further concert appearances and a subsequent resuming of writing and recording new music.

Allmusic reviewer Eduardo Rivadavia noted it's "unusually focused songwriting" utilizing "crushing riffs, spacey interludes" and an "understanding for heavy/light dynamics." In contrast, the songs "Riding Shotgun", "Caravan" and "Saguaro" were groove based pieces more akin to the style of the down-tuned guitar riff driven bands like Fu Manchu.

Peder Bergstrand (bass & vocals), in a 2021 interview shared more details on the previously unknown, continual and increasing interest in the album. When resuming live performance in 2013 at DesertFest Berlin and London the band realized that, "Ode to Io had sort of its own life and grown and become a classic, without us doing gigs." He later stated that they did not "do anything to promote it for 13 years" and at the 2013 DesertFest Berlin performance in particular, "there were like 2,000 people there, and people knew the songs".

In 2020 a remastered and expanded version was released that included additional tracks from the Ode to lo recording era.

== Track listing ==
=== Original release ===
No.	Title	Music	Length
1.	"Caravan"	Bergstrand	3:30
2.	"Flat Earth"	Bergstrand	5:35
3.	"Convoy V"	Bergstrand	5:14
4.	"Dust Settlin"	Bergstrand	5:04
5.	"Sun Devil"	Hellquist	1:15
6.	"Anchor"	Bergstrand; Hellquist	1:15
7.	"Texas Pt I & II"	Bergstrand; Hellquist	7:34
8.	"Riding Shotgun"	Bergstrand	6:06
9.	"Saguaro"	Bergstrand; Hellquist	5:20
10.	"Ode to Io"	Bergstrand	7:15

Deluxe edition (Remastered) 2020
No.	Title	Music	Length
11.	"The Gnome, The Serpent, The Sun"	Bergstrand	4:57
12.	"David Williams Hughes"	Bergstrand	5:24
13.	"Lameneshma"	Bergstrand	5:46
14.	"Shivaree"	Bergstrand	4:38
15.	"Ol' Mule Pepe"	Bergstrand	5:55
16.	"Upon The Dune"	Bergstrand	3:57
Total length:			01:23:03

== Personnel ==
- Andreas Eriksson - Drums
- Peder Bergstrand - Basses, Vocals
- Niclas Stalfors - Guitars
- Ola Hellquist - Lead Guitars, Vocals

== Credits ==
Recorded at KM Studios Karlskoga Sweden

The 1st & 3rd week of November 1999

Mixed & Mastered at KM Studios by Andreas Eriksson 2000

Album Photos by Daniel Onnerlov

Cutout Illustrations by Anatol Bolanowski

Cover Concept & Layout by Karate Kommando

Lyrics: Bergstrand/Stalfors/Hellquist/Eriksson

Opening Riff on Track 2 by Felix Daneken Jr.

== Remastered credits ==
Additional track credits are from the album's sleeve notes.

- All tracks remastered by Thomas Eberger at Stockholm Mastering in March of 2017.
- Tracks 11 & 13–16 were previously released as the Nebula/Lowrider split EP.
- Recorded and produced by Lowrider at KM Studios, Karlskoga, Sweden in May of 1998 (tracks 13–16) and August 1998 (track 11).
- Track 12 recorded in 2000 and released as part of the "I Am Vengeance" Soundtrack in 2001.
