= The Black Black =

Studio album by Solace
- Released: 2007
- Genre: Stoner metal
- Label: Underdogma Records, Land o' Smiles
- Producer: Solace, Eric Rachel

Solace chronology
Hammerhead (2006)	The Black Black (2007)	A.D. (2010)

Vinyl Cover

The Black Black is Solace's fifth studio recording. Referred to as "the distillation of thirty years of metal" and "the best material Solace has written", "The Black Black" was recorded at New Jersey's Trax East Studios over the course of a year. The album was compiled from tracks originally recorded for Solace's forthcoming album A.D. When the band realized that they simply had too much material for a single album, they removed four tracks for this EP.

Released on both CD and limited edition vinyl, both versions sport front cover art by Solace friend and repeat cover-artist Paul Vismara, while the CD version features interior and back cover photography by Penelope Pappas.

== Track listing ==
1. "Khan (World of Fire)"
2. "Destroy the Gift"
3. "The Devil's Clock"
4. "World War" (The Cure cover)

== Lineup ==
- Tommy Southard: Guitars
- Justin Daniels: Guitars
- Jason: Vocals, Lyrics
- Rob Hultz: Bass
- Kenny Lund: Drums
