= A Thin Shell =

Studio album by October Tide
- Released: 28 September 2010
- Recorded: March 2009 – March 2010
- Studio: Black Lounge and Abyss Studios
- Genre: Death-doom
- Length: 42:14
- Label: Candlelight
- Producer: Jonas Kjellgren

October Tide chronology
Grey Dawn (1999)	A Thin Shell (2010)	Tunnel of No Light (2013)

Professional ratings
Review scores
Source	Rating
AllMusic	4/5 stars

A Thin Shell is the third studio album by Swedish death-doom band October Tide. This was the first album the band released in 11 years. This is the only October Tide release with vocalist Tobias Netzell.

== Track listing ==
All lyrics are written by Tobias Netzell and Pierre Stam; all music is composed by Fredrik Norrman and October Tide

No.	Title	Length
1.	"The Custodian of Science"	7:33
2.	"Deplorable Request"	6:03
3.	"A Nighttime Project" (instrumental)	4:32
4.	"Blackness Devours"	5:15
5.	"The Dividing Line"	5:43
6.	"Fragile"	6:35
7.	"Scorned"	6:33
Total length:		42:14

== Personnel ==
October Tide

- Tobias Netzell – vocals
- Fredrik Norrman – guitar
- Robin Bergh – drums

Additional personnel

- Jonas Kjellgren – session bass, mixing, production
- Jeramie Kling – engineering
- Plec – mastering (at Panic-Room)
- Mattias Norrman – photography
- Andreas Kalén – photo editing
- Travis Smith – artwork, layout
