= Coping with the Urban Coyote =

Studio album by Unida
- Released: August 25, 1999 (LP); November 16, 1999 (CD)
- Recorded: January 4–14, 1999
- Genres: Stoner rock, hard rock
- Length: 36:57 (LP); 41:03 (CD); 67:56 (2014 reissue with bonus live album)
- Labels: Man's Ruin Records (CD); Cargo Records (vinyl)
- Producers: Unida & Steve Feldman

Unida chronology
Unida/Dozer (1999)	Coping with the Urban Coyote (1999)	The Great Divide (2001)

Professional ratings
Review scores
Source	Rating
AllMusic	4/5 stars

Coping with the Urban Coyote is the first full release by American rock band Unida on Man's Ruin Records.

== Track listing ==
LP version Side A
No.	Title	Length
1.	"Thorn"	3:14
2.	"Black Woman"	5:14
3.	"You Wish"	9:16

Side B
No.	Title	Length
4.	"Human Tornado"	4:22
5.	"If Only Two"	5:17
6.	"Nervous"	6:41
7.	"Dwarf It"	2:33

CD version
No.	Title	Length
1.	"Thorn"	3:14
2.	"Black Woman"	5:14
3.	"Plastic"	4:03
4.	"Human Tornado"	4:22
5.	"If Only Two"	5:17
6.	"Nervous"	6:41
7.	"Dwarf It"	2:33
8.	"You Wish"	9:16

=== Re-release with bonus live album ===
Disc 1 follows the track listing of the original 1999 LP. On the CD, these tracks appear as tracks 7 through 14.

Side A
No.	Title	Length
1.	"Red"	4:46
2.	"Human Tornado"	4:40
3.	"Nervous"	6:30

Side B
No.	Title	Length
4.	"Puppet Man"	2:57
5.	"MFNO"	2:52
6.	"Dwarf It"	3:20
7.	"Black Woman"	6:11
Total length:		30:56

The bonus live album was recorded at the Desertfest in London, England on April 27, 2013.

Track 1 is from the Unida/Dozer double EP. Tracks 4 and 5 are from the unreleased second album of the band, intended for release in 2001 on American Recordings. The rest of the songs are from Coping with the Urban Coyote.

== Personnel ==
- John Garcia – vocals
- Dave Dinsmore – bass
- Arthur Seay – guitars
- Miguel Cancino – drums
- Produced by Steve Feldman & Unida

== Notes ==
The song "Black Woman" was featured on the soundtrack of the 2003 video game Tony Hawk's Underground.
