= Rain Without End =

Studio album by October Tide
- Released: 1997
- Recorded: 1995
- Studio: Unisound
- Genre: Death-doom
- Length: 39:12
- Label: Vic
- Producer: Dan Swanö

October Tide chronology
Rain Without End (1997)	Grey Dawn (1999)

Alternate cover
- 2008 Reissue Cover

Rain Without End is the debut studio album by Swedish death-doom band October Tide. This is the only October Tide release with Jonas Renkse on vocals. The album was reissued on 10 November 2008.

== Track listing ==
No.	Title	Length
1.	"12 Days of Rain"	6:43
2.	"Ephemeral"	6:22
3.	"All Painted Cold"	5:45
4.	"Sightless"	6:28
5.	"Losing Tomorrow"	2:35
6.	"Blue Gallery"	5:43
7.	"Infinite Submission"	5:36
Total length:		39:12

== Personnel ==
=== October Tide ===
- Jonas Renkse – vocals, drums, guitar
- Fred Norrman – guitar, bass

=== Additional personnel ===
- Morion – keyboards, various effects
- Christer Åberg – violin
