= Astrosoniq =

Dutch rock band

- Origin: Oss, Netherlands
- Genres: Stoner rock, space rock, psychedelic rock, sludge metal
- Years active: 1999–present
- Labels: Freebird, Suburban, Spacejam
- Members: Marcel van de Vondervoort; Ron van Herpen; Robert-Jan Gruijthuijzen; Fred van Bergen; Teun van der Velden
- Website: www.astrosoniq.com

Astrosoniq (sometimes styled as A5tro5oniq) is a band from Oss, Netherlands.

Each of its album covers features hair growing out of skin. Sometimes a woman, sometimes a man, or sometimes a circle of flesh surrounded by hair.

== Musical style ==
Astrosoniq's musical style is characterized by extremely psychedelic guitar riffs. The result is stoner rock with a space flavor. It integrates sound clips from old movies, Wonder Woman episodes and other sources. Most continue the themes of fantasy and space.

The band cites classic heavy rock artists as their influences, which can be seen in the heavy guitar riffs and drums.

== Personnel ==
- Fred van Bergen: Vocals
- Teun van der Velden: Rhythm guitar, keyboards
- Ron van Herpen: Lead guitar
- Robert-Jan Gruijthuijzen: Bass, vocals
- Marcel van de Vondervoort: Drums, percussion
  - Note that van de Vondervoort is sees as responsible for the production and mixing of Astrosoniq's music.

== Discography ==
- 2000 - Son of A.P. Lady (full album CD on Freebird Records).
- 2002 - Soundgrenade (full album CD on Freebird Records).
- 2005 - Made in Oss (6-song EP, both on 10" vinyl and CD on Spacejam Records).
- 2006 - Speeder People (full album CD on Suburban Records).
- 2007 - "Astrosuper" / "Superastro" (7" single, split with the Liszt on Spacejam Records)
- 2009 - Quadrant (full album CD on Spacejam Records)
- 2018 - Big Ideas Dare Imagination
