= Unida/Dozer =

The Best of Wayne-Gro/Coming Down the Mountain

EP (split) by Dozer / Unida
- Released: April 20, 1999; February 28, 2006 (reissue)
- Studio: Monkey Studios, Palm Springs; Rockhouse Studios, Borlänge
- Genre: Stoner metal
- Length: 36:16
- Label: MeteorCity
- Producer: Bengt Bäcke, Chris Goss, Dozer, Unida

Unida chronology
The Best of Wayne-Gro/Coming Down the Mountain (1999)	Coping with the Urban Coyote (1999)

Dozer chronology
Coming Down The Mountain (1999)	In the Tail of a Comet (2000)

Professional ratings
Review scores
Source	Rating
AllMusic	4/5 stars

Unida/Dozer (The Best of Wayne-Gro/Coming Down the Mountain) is a split EP featuring the stoner rock bands Dozer and Unida. It is one of the first releases for both bands and was released in 1999 by MeteorCity and re-issued in 2006.

The first press of the vinyl version is limited to 1,000 copies on red vinyl. The second press is also only 1,000 copies but on marbled white and black vinyl. Both vinyl versions come with a poster advertising the Unida/Dozer split EP and Nebula/Lowrider split EP as well as the Unida/Nebula 1999 Tour.

== Track listing ==
Unida – The Best of Wayne-Gro
No.	Title	Length
1.	"Flower Girl"	4:43
2.	"Red"	4:28
3.	"Delta Alba Plex"	4:35
4.	"Wet Pussycat (Original Version)"	6:09

Dozer – Coming Down the Mountain
No.	Title	Length
1.	"Headed for the Sun"	4:04
2.	"Calamari Sidetrip"	5:04
3.	"From Mars"	3:01
4.	"Overheated"	4:08

== Personnel ==
Unida

- John Garcia – vocals
- Dave Dinsmore – bass
- Arthur Seay – guitars
- Miguel Cancino – drums

Dozer

- Fredrik Nordin – vocals, guitars
- Tommi Holappa – guitars
- Johan Rockner – bass
- Erik Bäckwall – drums
