= Unida =

American rock band

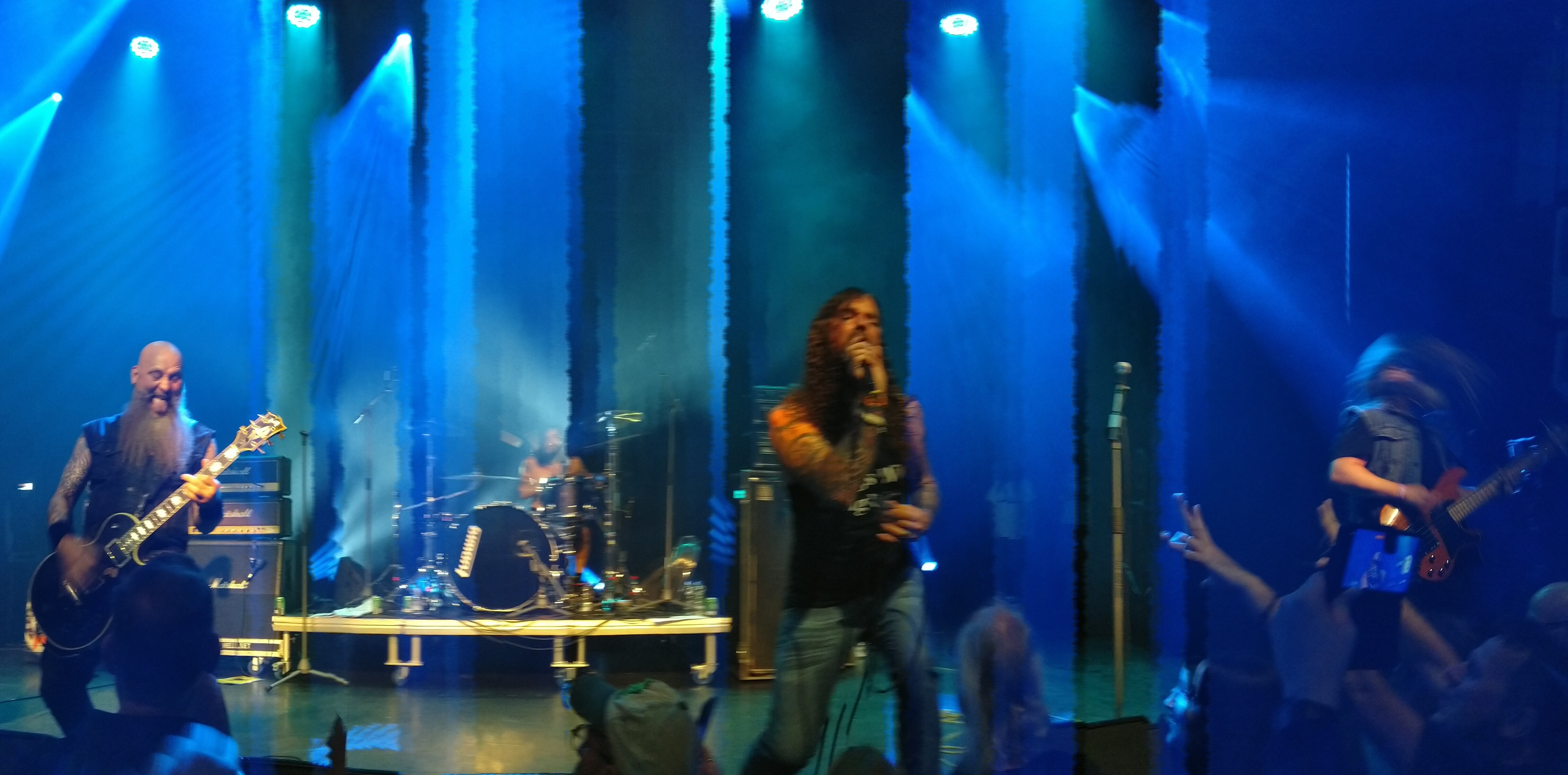
- Unida in 2022

Background information
- Origin: United States
- Genres: Heavy metal; hard rock; stoner rock
- Years active: 1998–2004; 2008; 2012–2014; 2022–present
- Labels: Man's Ruin; MeteorCity; American; High Times
- Spinoff of: Kyuss; Slo Burn
- Members: Mark Sunshine; Arthur Seay; Collyn McCoy; Miguel Cancino
- Past members: John Garcia; Dave Dinsmore; Scott Reeder; Eddie Plascencia; Owen Seay

Unida (/juːˈniːdə/) is an American stoner rock band formed in 1998. The band's current line-up consists of Mark Sunshine, Arthur Seay, Miguel Cancino and Collyn McCoy. Their debut album, Coping with the Urban Coyote, was released in 1999. A follow-up album, initially titled The Great Divide and later titled For the Working Man, was recorded in the early 2000s, but has remained unreleased.

== History ==
=== Formation, Dozer split, and Coping with the Urban Coyote (1998–1999) ===
Following the dissolution of Kyuss in 1995, former vocalist John Garcia became part of Slo Burn. Garcia already knew future Unida members Arthur Seay and Miguel (Mike) Cancino, considering them "exceptional" musicians and songwriters; therefore, after the end of Slo Burn in 1998, he reached out to them to start a band. Garcia later reflected that "I really wanted to jam with them and I knew that they could play and it was basically as simple as that." The band's original lineup consisted of Garcia (vocals), Seay (guitar), Cancino (drums) and Dave Dinsmore (bass).

The band's name of Unida (/juːˈniːdə/), which is Spanish for "united" was chosen to reflect the band member's surroundings. Garcia explained, "being that half of the band is Hispanic and we’re from Southern California, it was very fitting – there’s a camaraderie in the desert amongst musicians that continues still to this day."

One of the band's earliest known live shows was in February 1999, at Spaceland in California, supporting Nebula; however, according to an interview with Sergio Chotsourian from the band Los Natas, their first-ever performance was at a 1998 New Year’s Eve party at Scott Reeder's house in Palm Springs.

In 1999, Unida appeared on a MeteorCity split EP release with the Swedish band Dozer, the Unida portion of which was titled The Best of Wayne-Gro. Later that year, they released their debut full-length album, entitled Coping with the Urban Coyote, on Man's Ruin Records.

=== Second studio album (2000–2004) ===
Based on the quality of The Best of Wayne-Gro and Coping with the Urban Coyote, Unida (now joined by Scott Reeder as their new bass player) were signed to Rick Rubin's American Recordings and began working on their next album (reportedly titled The Great Divide). The album was produced by George Drakoulias (who had previously worked with Tom Petty and The Black Crowes) and executive produced by Rubin. According to Garcia (who praised Drakoulias for providing a "religious experience"), the album cost US$350,000 (equivalent to $636,394 in 2025) to create, and was completed in May 2001; however, before it was delivered, the label was acquired by Island / DefJam. Later reflecting on the situation, in 2017, Seay said to Coachella Valley Independent that "Sony was the machine doing all the work at the time. Sony/Columbia loved us at the time and thought we did great shit ... but when we were done with our record, Rick Rubin’s deal was up ... He was pissed off at Sony about something. He made a deal to go back to Island/Def Jam".

Ultimately, Island/Def Jam decided not to release the album, and the band were able to (in Seay's words) "get out" of their contract, because "[the label] weren't meeting deadlines;" however, Unida "didn’t get the record." Speaking to Blabbermouth in June 2002, Reeder stated that:

"The artwork was done, everything was looking really good, and then ... after months of being just strung along—'Oh, yeah, the release date got bumped back a little bit'—finally we found out that somebody at the label didn't like the record, so they didn't want to deal with it. The lawyers had to go back and forth for months and months and months—a chess game where every move takes two months... 'You have sixty days to reply to this letter'...and...so we just got out of the deal, a month ago."

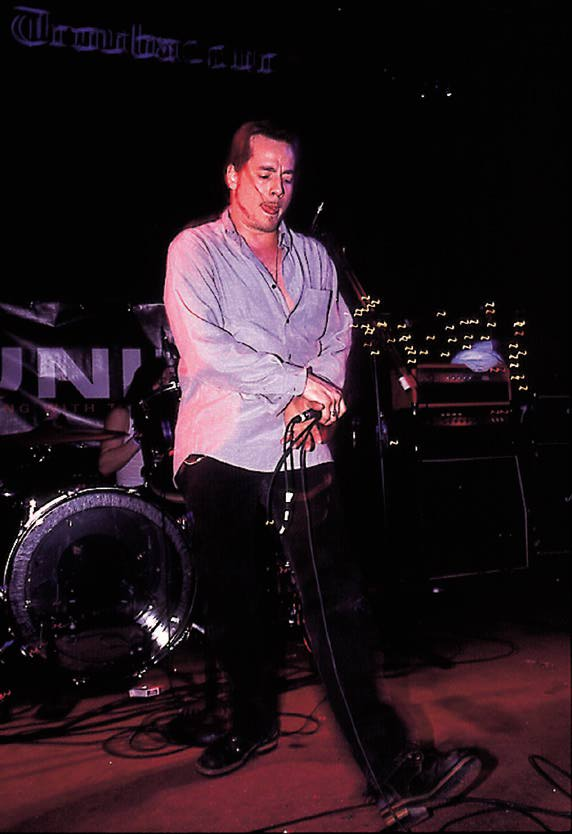
Garcia live with Unida in Los Angeles in 2000

Speaking to the same publication a month later, Garcia described the actions they were taking to acquire a new label for the release, stating that American Recordings were offering to sell them the record back for US$150,000 (equivalent to $272,740 in 2025):

"[We] shopped the record, we released the CDs to just about every single major label in the world that would sign a band like Unida ... there is one label who wants it, and that's Sony over in Europe. So the immediate plan is that Sony Europe is going to take the record and have it for Europe, and I think the rest of the world, so what we're going to do here in the States is hopefully find a smaller label, an indie, if you will, that has a little bit of money, and that will take it just for North America and we're going to do it that way.

The track listing for the album (featuring 13 tracks) was first published by the band in April 2002. In the years following, the album was supposedly sold on CD-Rs by the band during some touring shows, with a "rough-cut" version also accidentally sent out by the band's management. In March 2003, it was reported that Reeder had left the band, with the original replacement simply known as "Jerry". Reeder released a statement shortly after, confirming that his decision to leave was not related to his audition attempt to join Metallica:

"Just tired of stopping and starting for other stuff. And after all the bullshit that we'd gone through, I certainly wouldn't ask or expect anyone to give up any of their other projects. I wish my brothers the best in everything they do ... when I accepted the invitation with Metallica, I figured that was the end for me in Unida either way - it would've been pretty hippocritical [sic] of me to go on after that."

Following Reeder's departure, Slipknot's Paul Gray joined the band as a touring bassist for their west-coast US tour later in 2003. Subsequently, the role transitioned to Eddie Plascencia, but Unida ultimately went into hiatus later that year. The band's members went on to release further material with other projects, including Hermano (Garcia) and House of Broken Promises (Seay, Cancino, and Plascencia).

Unida's song "Black Woman" was featured on the soundtrack to the 2003 skateboarding video game Tony Hawk's Underground, and in 2004, they contributed a previously unreleased song, "Left Us to Mold", to High Volume: The Stoner Rock Collection, from High Times (which featured tracks from bands such as Clutch, Corrosion of Conformity, Monster Magnet, Nebula, Sea of Green, and High on Fire).

=== Reunions (2008; 2012–2014; 2022–present) ===
In February 2008, Unida performed a reunion show, alongside Mondo Generator. The band then band reformed again in 2012, playing their first new live show in August of that year, before headlining the Desertfest Festival in London, and the Cherry Rock Festival in Melbourne (co-headlining with Sweden's Truckfighters) in 2013.

2012's reformed lineup featured returns from Garcia, Seay, and Cancino, but now included Arthur Seay's 20-year-old nephew, Owen Seay on bass. Speaking to Coachella Valley Weekly, Arthur Seay explained that "we wanted a young hungry dude with no baggage. We've been through a lot with different bass players and we have a super positive family vibe so we just wanted someone who fits ... It's a really cool start over… a new beginning kind of deal ... everything feels great again and part of that is having a new fresh bass player."

Speaking to HEAVY Magazine in 2013, Garcia indicated that, despite the reunion, the band was in what he called a "a permanent idling position", stating that "every once in a while we’re going to put some gasoline in the gas tank, we’re going to rev up, and we’re going to take it for a ride because it feels good to ride in that car again."

At the time of Garcia's 2013 interview, the band's long-delayed album from 2001 had become known as For the Working Man. Speaking with the Coachella Valley Independent in 2017, Arthur Shaey stated that he hoped the album would eventually see a "proper release," (instead of unofficial mixes present on sites such as YouTube) possibly within the same year:

"It was actually supposed to come out last year, but due to our schedules, we pushed it back to this year ... All the other guys want to do it, and I’ve had meetings with the label. They went in the vault and found the record after a period in time where they couldn’t find it. It’s all there ... I definitely want to get that Unida record out. It’s been a thorn in our sides forever. It’ll be a mainstream, major-label push, which will help all our other projects. It’s going to be new to a lot of people, and it stands up today as it did then."

To coincide with the anniversary of their first two releases, Unida reformed again in 2022, for a European tour, including Desertfest in Antwerp. This new lineup would be the first not to feature Garcia on vocals (with the role instead going to Mark Sunshine from Riotgod) and the first to feature Collyn McCoy (from the Ultra Electric Mega Galactic) on bass. An official statement by the band stated that "John will not be singing but gives us his blessing, he is not out of the band either."

== Band members ==
Current members

- Mark Sunshine (singer) – vocals (2022–Present)
- Arthur Seay – guitars (1997-Present)
- Collyn McCoy – bass (2022–Present)
- Miguel Cancino – drums (1997-Present)

Past Members

- John Garcia - vocals (1997–2014)
- Dave Dinsmore – bass (1998–2000)
- Scott Reeder – bass (1999–2003)
- Eddie Plascencia – bass (2000–2004, 2008)(House of Broken Promises)
- Jerry Montano (Danzig, DeadLights) – bass (2003)

Past live members

- Paul Gray – bass (2003)

== Discography ==
=== Studio albums ===
- Coping with the Urban Coyote (1999)

=== EPs ===
- Unida/Dozer (1999)
