= Lowrider (Swedish band) =

Swedish stoner rock band

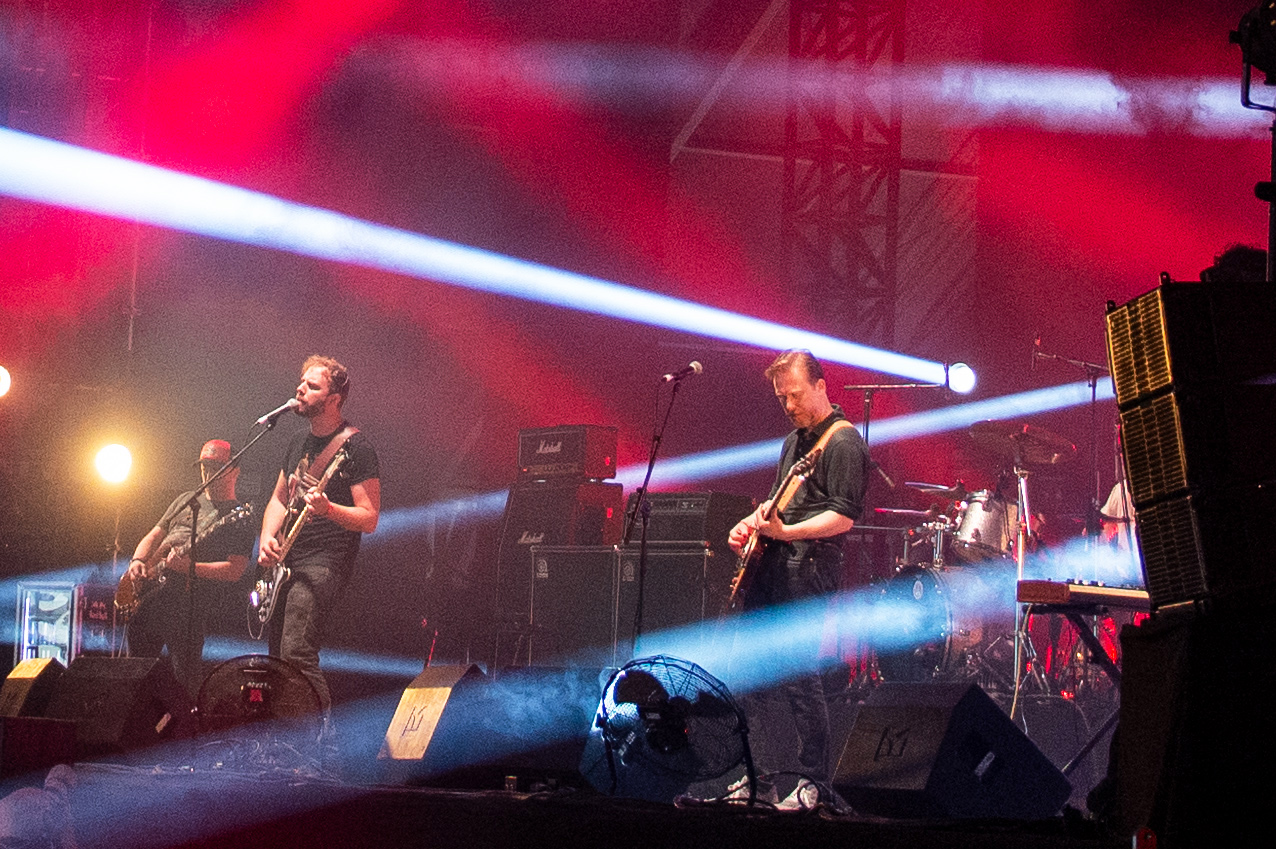
- Lowrider at Hellfest, 2022.

Background information
- Origin: Sweden
- Genres: Stoner rock
- Years active: Mid-1990s–2003, 2013, 2017–present
- Labels: MeteorCity; Blues Funeral
- Members: Peder Bergstrand; Ole Hellquist; Niclas Stalfors; Andreas Eriksson

Lowrider is a Swedish stoner rock band formed in Karlstad in the mid-1990s by bassist/singer Peder Bergstrand and lead guitarist/singer Ole Hellquist, along with guitarist Niclas Stalfors and drummer Andreas Eriksson.

== History ==
After releasing the Nebula/Lowrider Double EP in 1999 (split with psychedelic stoner rock band Nebula), the band embarked upon a European tour in 2000, when they played fourteen venues in eight countries, co-headlining with Dozer and once with Spiritual Beggars.

Their debut album Ode to Io was released in 2000. The release was hailed as "Sweden's answer to all that is rocky, funky, gritty and downright rock n' roll" by Critical Metal in 2001. Metal Hammer in a 2022 article listing the album among the most influential stoner rock albums stated, "If any band can casually encapsulate their entire subgenre, Sweden's Lowrider are probably it." In 2001 MeteorCity Records released the album, I Am Vengeance: Original Soundtrack featuring songs by fellow stoner rock artists including Eternal Elysium, Sheavy and The Quill with the Lowrider track described as a "feedback-filled dirge" entitled "David William Hughes". Released on 22 October 2002, the band contributed a cowbell featured version of Leaf Hound's track "Freelance Fiend" from the 1971 album, Growers of Mushroom to the album Sucking the 70's released by Small Stone Records which was composed of modern rock bands covering hard rock songs of the 1970's. It received a "Bell Score" of 4.0262 out of 5 at the Ultimate Cowbell Database.

The band unofficially broke up in 2003 with Bergstrand stating in a 2020 interview about the reasons about why they broke up when he said "we never really split up, we just stopped rehearsing as much and then even less." They were invited to reform for performances at DesertFest Berlin and London in 2013.

=== Refractions (2020–2023) ===
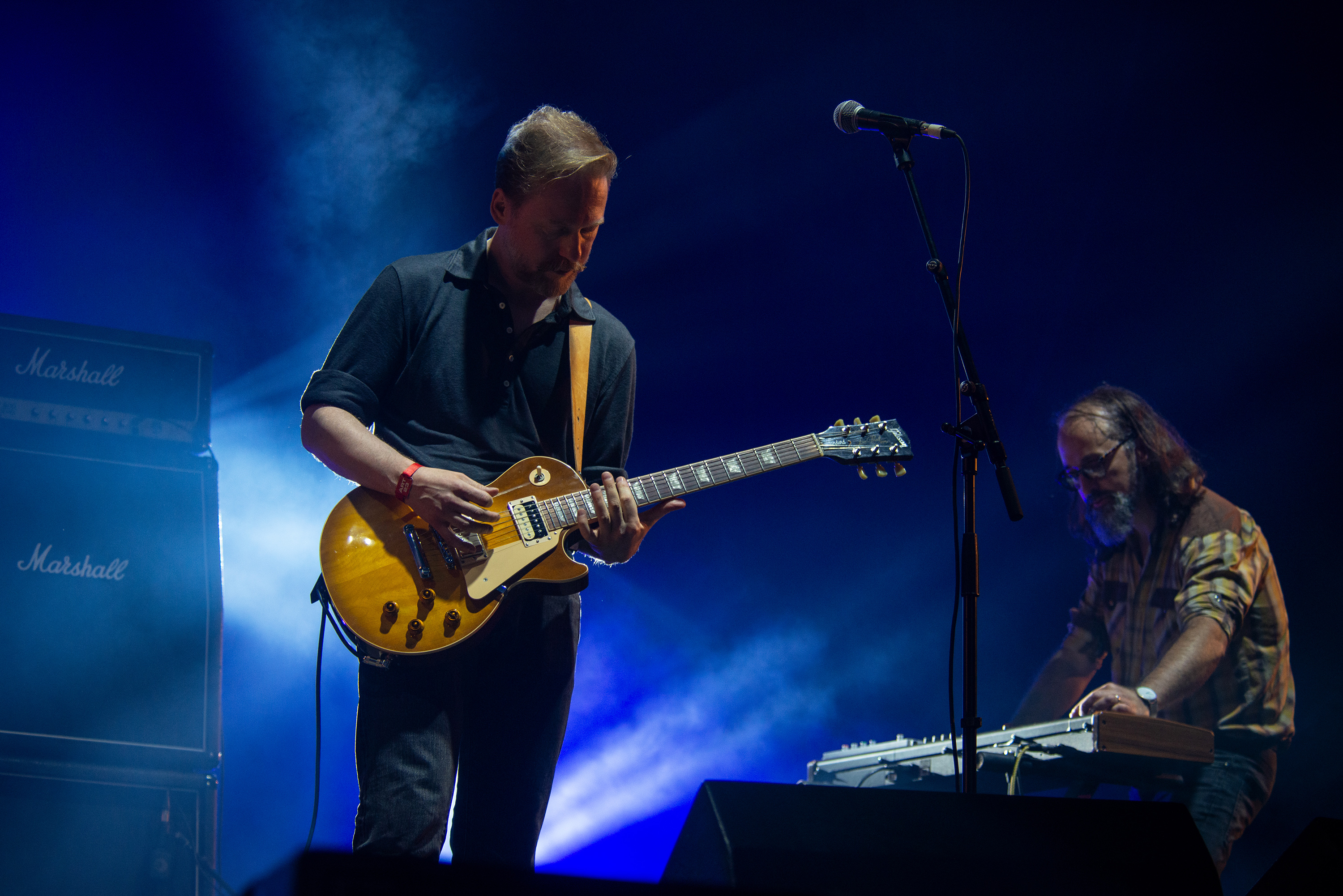
Guitarist Ole Hellquist and keyboardist Pelle Andersson performing at the 2022 version of Hellfest.

With the original lineup intact they released the album Refractions on 21 February 2020 through Blues Funeral Recordings. The first single released was "Ode To Ganymede" with Metal Injection noting the progression of the band in that "so many of the classic Lowrider tropes are there. You get the sense though that the band has tapped into something more." Their performance with songs from Refractions, which was held at the Electric Ballroom for the 2022 version of DesertFest in London was observed as a being "a momentous psych celebration for the stoner world." During this year the band began to be joined by keyboardist/Hammond organ player Pelle Andersson for appearances ranging from some songs of the set to entire performances.

=== The Long Forever and collaborations with Elephant Tree (2024-present) ===
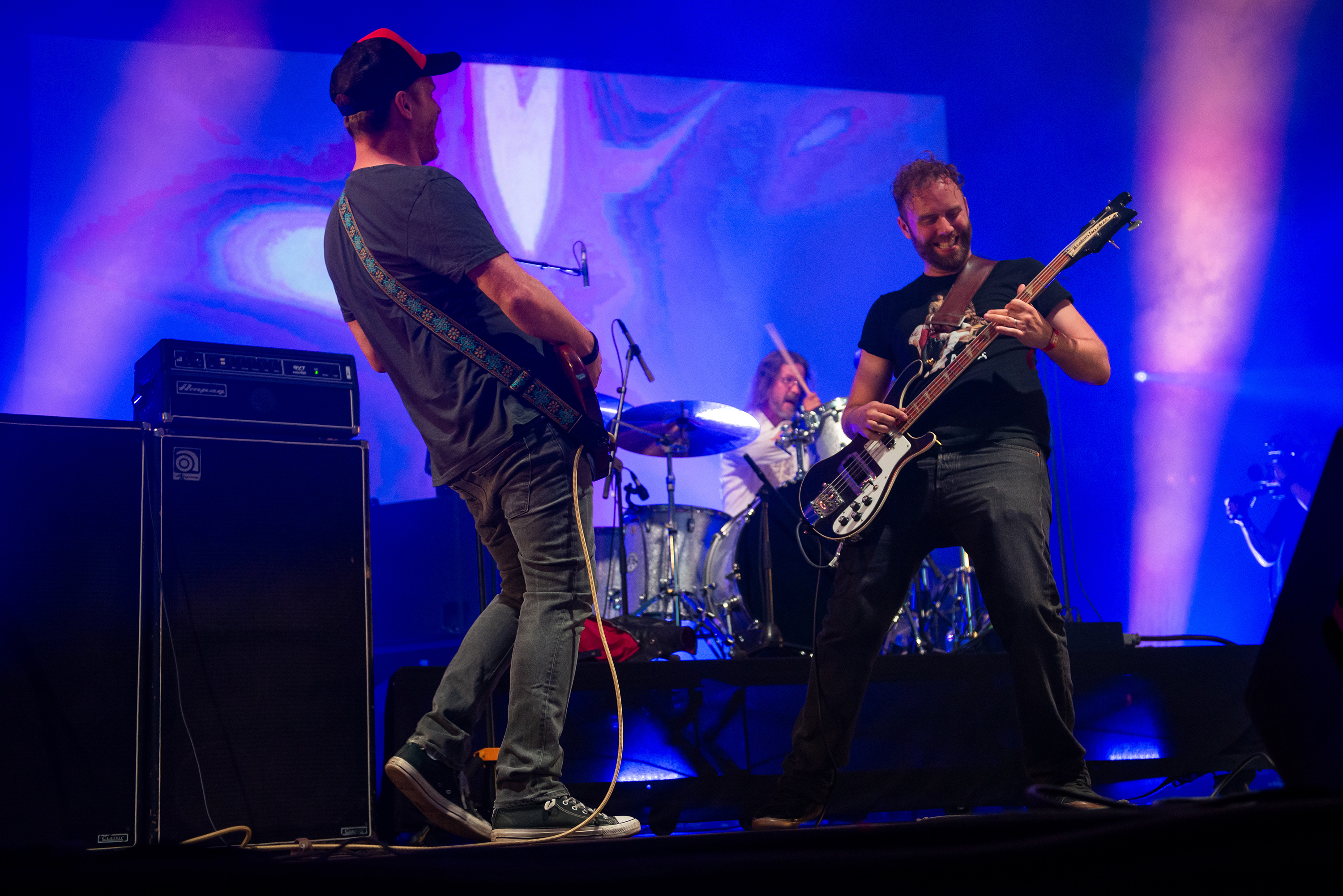
Guitarist Niclas Stalfors, drummer Andreas Eriksson and bassist Peder Bergstrand performing in Clisson, France in 2022.

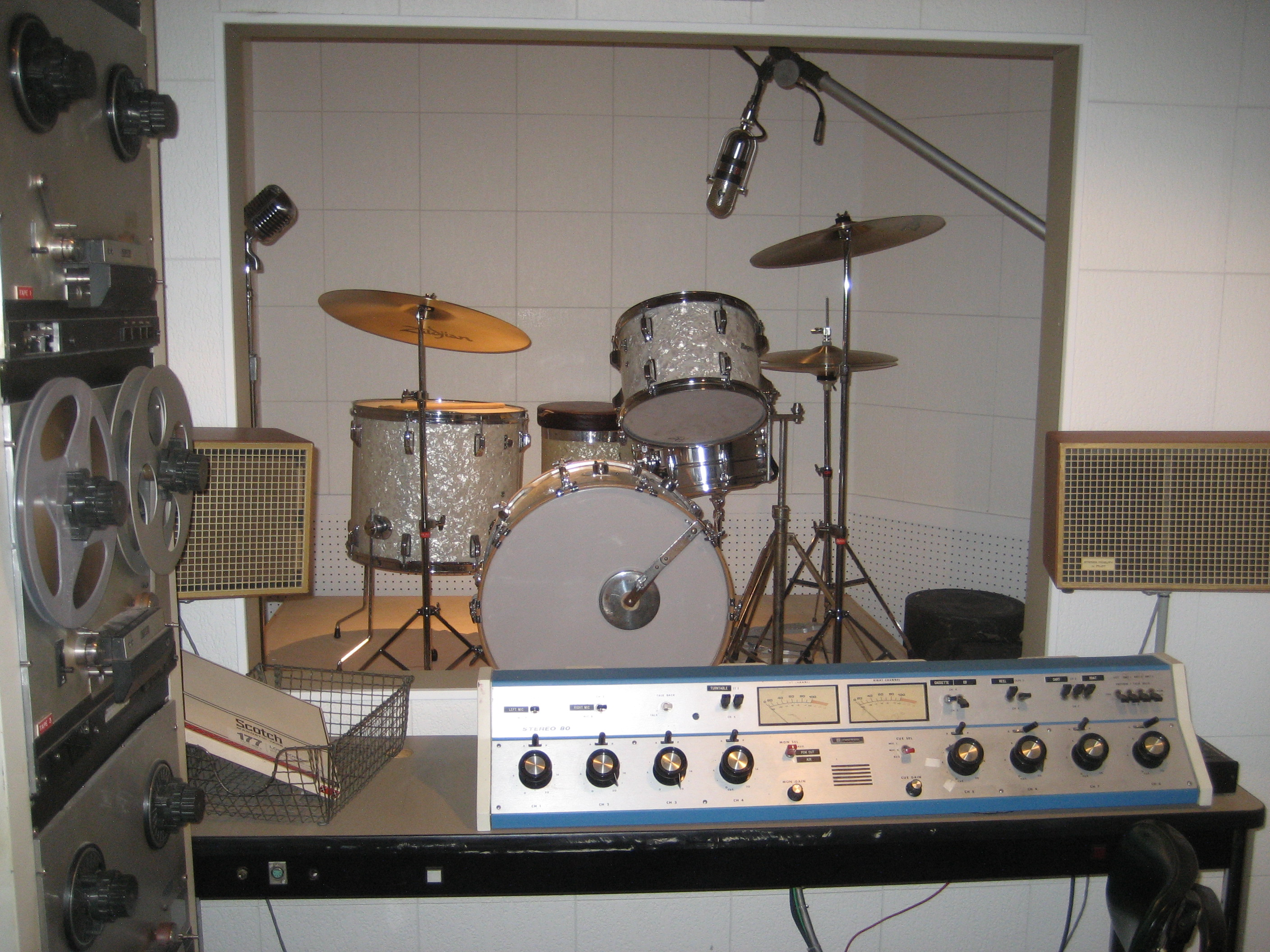
An example of a minimal microphone drum recording setup.

A split/collaboration album titled The Long Forever with the band Elephant Tree was announced to be released on 25 October 2024 through the record label Blues Funeral Recordings. Each side ended with a song where members of the other band play as guests on it. These were Lowrider's "Through The Rift (feat. Elephant Tree)" and Elephant Tree's "Long Forever (feat. Lowrider)". The combined effort songs were described as being produced by a "stoner/heavy psych supergroup for the ages" by Distorted Sound Magazine. The album was the first collaborative release from Lowrider and Elephant Tree to chart in the UK peaking at number 80 on the UK Album Downloads Chart. They released their first official Bergstrand produced video for the track "And The Horse You Rode In On" featuring a T-shirt worn by Stalfors with imagery promoting the band endorsed message "to take care of your pets and not eat them."

The groups continued the collaboration contributing the Jethro Tull song "Nothing to Say" from the 1970 studio album Benefit to the album The Very Best of Jethro Tull Redux which was released on 6 December 2024 through Magnetic Eye Records. Lyrically "Nothing to Say" deals with addressing "those who use social causes for their own ends". It also featured a dual guitar, and bass guitar riff played between vocals sung over a 5-bar Aeolian chord progression. One guitar being played fingerstyle and the other guitar using a plectrum. In a statement about the album released through Magnetic Eye Records, the lineup for the track consisted of Lowrider guitarist Niclas Stalfors, bassist/vocalist Peder Bergstrand and Elephant Tree drummer Sam Hart. The drums were recorded at his countryside rehearsal studio using a two microphone setup similar to the Glyn Johns approach to recording method which used few microphones to record drums to create a natural sound of the drum set. In review of the album Blabbermouth.net noted it as "crushing, clever and resolutely out-there" with the Elephant Tree/Lowrider song as being a "disorientating, woozy marvel."

== Equipment and Influence ==
A constant feature of the bands overall sound has been rhythm guitarist Niclas Stalfors "1974 Gibson SG Standard and a 1977 Gibson RD Artist. The RD is all original parts intact with the Moog circuit still working." In an interview about bass gear with Keepers Of The Low End, Bergtrand's main bass played live and on studio recordings is a 1971 Rickenbacker 4001 bass played through a Ampeg SVT bass amplifier. Tunings used include Drop C tuning where the strings are tuned down one full step with "the E string tuned down one more full step." Beginning with Refractions the band began to implement electronic instruments beyond just guitars, bass guitars and drums by using electronic instruments including the Moog synthesizer. Rock bands cited as influencing them included Led Zeppelin, The Rolling Stones, Cream, Black Sabbath and Soundgarden.

== Discography ==
=== Albums ===
- Ode to Io (2000) (re-release 2002)
- Refractions (2020)

=== EP ===
- Nebula/Lowrider (1998) – split with Nebula
- The Long Forever (2024) – split with Elephant Tree

=== Compilation appearances ===
- "David Williams Hughes" (2001) – I am Vengeance: Original Soundtrack CD (MCY-016 MeteorCity)
- "Freelance Fiend" (2002) – Sucking the 70's (SS-032/2002 Small Stone Records)
- "Nothing to Say" (2024) – The Very Best of Jethro Tull (Redux) (2023 Magnetic Eye Records)
