= Further (Solace album) =

Studio album by Solace
- Released: 2000 (re-released 2005)
- Genre: Stoner metal, doom metal
- Label: MeteorCity Records, People Like You Records
- Producer: Eric Rachel, Solace

Solace chronology
Distanced from Reality (1999)	Further (2000)	13 (2003)

Professional ratings
Review scores
Source	Rating
AllMusic	3/5 stars

Further is the first full-length album by American heavy metal band Solace. This album's cover art was done by heavy metal art veteran Wes Benscoter and is entitled "Midnight Mass 2".

Recorded by Eric Rachel at Trax East Studios (birthplace of albums from such New Jersey bands as Skid Row and The Misfits), Further was quickly hailed as an important addition to the independent doom and stoner metal movements. Though comparisons were made to such genre bands as Goatsnake, The Obsessed and Cathedral, Further was considered by some darker than most works of the stoner style, and was even compared to the likes of Black Sabbath, Tool, Soundgarden and Alice in Chains.

Originally released in 2000, the US version featured 8 tracks, while the European version contained an additional 2 cover songs. A revamped version featuring these two additional songs was re-released in the US in 2005.

== Track listing ==
=== German/2000 vinyl release ===
1. A1 "Man Dog" – 7:11
2. A2 "Black Unholy Ground" – 7:30
3. A3 "Whistle Pig" – 4:14
4. B1 "Followed" – 8:29
5. B2 "Suspicious Tower" – 4:40
6. B3 "Another Life" – 4:32 (Iron Maiden cover)
7. C1 "Hungry Mother" – 2:26
8. C2 "Angels Dreaming" – 9:01
9. C3 "We Bite" – 2:12 (The Misfits cover)
10. D1 "Heavy Birth/2-Fisted" – 11:28
11. D2 "Hungry Mother/Reprise" – 1:30

This version has a different running order of the tracks, the instrumental "Hungry Mother/Reprise" is only released here. It was pressed as a double LP in colored vinyl by the German Label "People like you Records" and released under the following catalogue number: PRISON 991–1. "Heavy Birth/2-Fisted" was cut before the silence began.

=== US/2000 release ===
1. "Man Dog" – 7:11
2. "Black Unholy Ground" – 7:30
3. "Followed" – 8:29
4. "Whistle Pig" – 4:14
5. "Hungry Mother" – 2:26
6. "Angels Dreaming" – 9:01
7. "Suspicious Tower" – 4:40
8. "Heavy Birth/2-Fisted" – 16:23

=== European/2005 release ===
1. "Man Dog" – 7:11
2. "Black Unholy Ground" – 7:30
3. "Followed" – 8:29
4. "Whistle Pig" – 4:14
5. "Hungry Mother" – 2:26
6. "Angels Dreaming" – 9:01
7. "Suspicious Tower" – 4:40
8. "Heavy Birth/2-Fisted" – 16:23
9. "Another Life" (Iron Maiden cover)
10. "We Bite" (The Misfits cover)
- The title Further is an indirect reference to Solace's debut EP Distanced from Reality, the idea being that the band is "distanced even further from reality".
- Lyrics to only four of the songs on this album have ever been officially released. It is commonly believed that the intensely personal nature of vocalist Jason's lyrics prevent him from allowing their publication.

== Personnel ==
- Tommy Southard: Guitars
- Jason: Vocals, Lyrics
- Rob Hultz: Bass
- Bill "Bixby" Belford: Drums
- Eric Rachel: Recording, Production
- Alan Douches: Mastering
