= Greenleaf (band) =

Swedish rock band

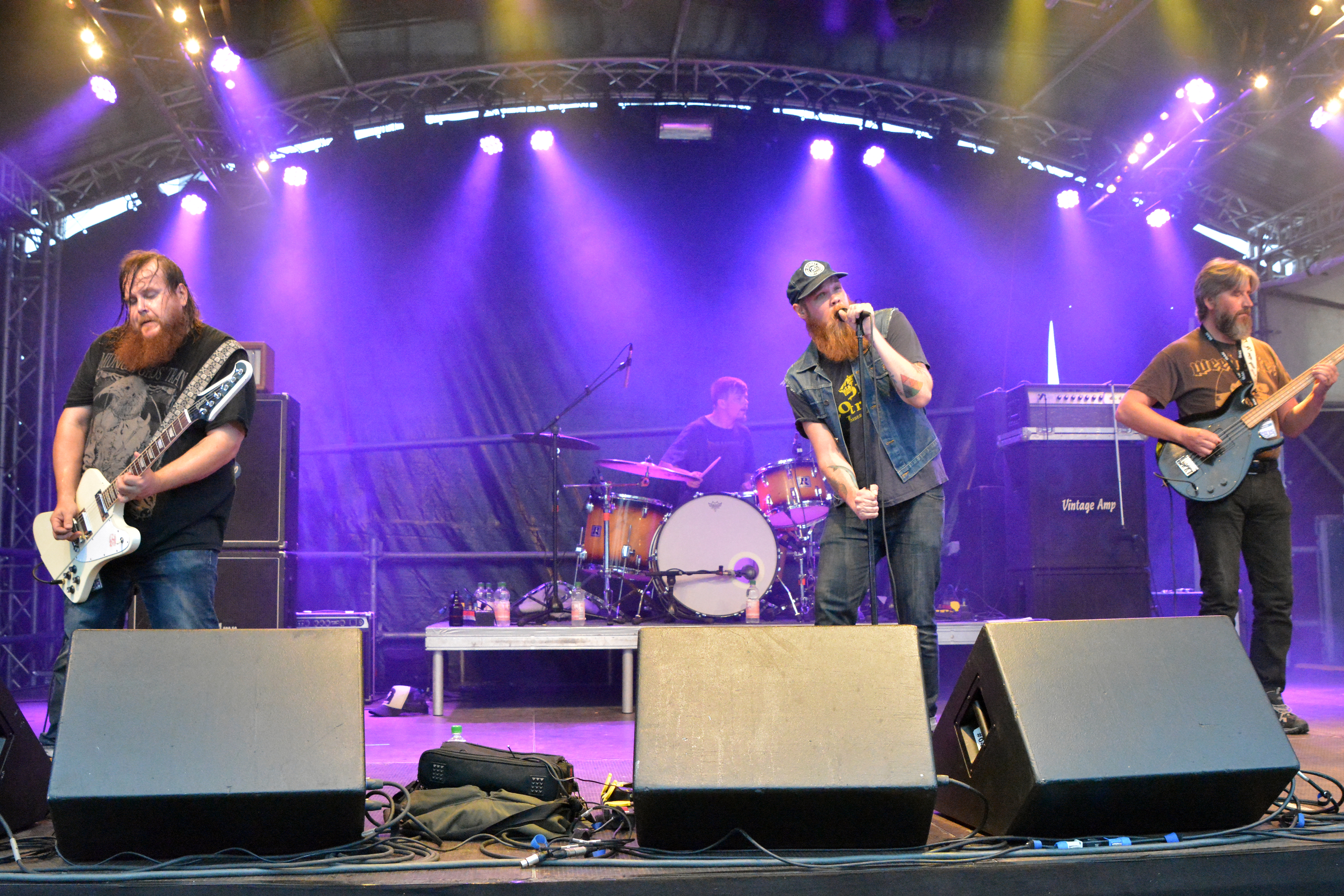
- Greenleaf performing in 2015

Background information
- Origin: Borlänge, Sweden
- Genres: Stoner rock; hard rock
- Years active: 1999–present
- Labels: Molten Universe; Small Stone; Napalm; Magnetic Eye Records
- Members: Tommi Holappa; Hans Fröhlich; Sebastian Olsson; Arvid Hällagård
- Past members: Daniel Lidén; Peder Bergstrand; Fredrik Nordin; Daniel Jansson; Singe; Bengt Bäcke; Johan Rockner; Jocke Ahslund; Oskar Cedermalm; Erik Bäckwall; Olle Mårthans
- Website: Greenleaf on Facebook

Greenleaf is a Swedish rock band created as a side project in late 1999 by Tommi Holappa (Dozer), Daniel Lidén (Demon Cleaner) and Bengt Bäcke (record producer/studio engineer; Dozer, Demon Cleaner, Lowrider). In 2003, Lidén joined Dozer, making three of the four Dozers members also members of Greenleaf, so the band took a back seat until 2007.

In 2018 Magnetic Eye Records released The Wall [Redux] album which was a recreation of Pink Floyd's 1979 double album The Wall recorded with different musicians on each track. Greenleaf contributed the single track, "Another Brick in the Wall, Pt. 3 / Goodbye Cruel World" which combined the final two tracks from side two of the original album. In a statement shared with Ultimate Classic Rock, Magnetic Eye Records said, "The Wall [Redux] isn't a tribute album, but a powerful musical statement that's certainly appropriate at a cultural moment when the themes of separatism, alienation and divisiveness set forth by Roger Waters and company are more relevant than ever."

== The Head & The Habit (2024–present) ==
The album The Head & The Habit was released June 21, 2024. The first single released for the album was "Breathe, Breathe Out". Vocalist Arvid Hällagård commented on the theme of the song and album saying it "encourages embracing one’s current state, appreciating what you have, and navigating through life with a sense of control and acceptance." It was released on LP, CD, and digital formats.

Providing the lead in the production of the album was Karl Daniel Liden whom guitarist Tommi Holappa referred to as an honorary "fifth member" of the band. They also broke the album into two parts stating that the "tracklist for this album was decided with the idea of vinyl in mind, because we wanted two sides, both of which ended with a softer song".

== Discography ==
Note: lineup changes in bold.

=== Albums ===
Greenleaf EP (2000) – Molten Universe

- **Peder Bergstrand** (Lowrider) – vocals
- **Tommi Holappa** – guitar
- **Bengt Bäcke** – bass
- **Daniel Lidén** – drums

(Review: Stonerrock.com)

Revolution Rock (2001) – Molten Universe

- **Fredrik Nordin** (Dozer) – vocals
- Tommi Holappa – guitar
- Bengt Bäcke – bass
- Daniel Lidén – drums

(Review: Stonerrock.com)

Secret Alphabets (2003) – Small Stone Records

- Fredrik Nordin – vocals
- Tommi Holappa – guitar
- **Daniel Jansson** (Demon Cleaner) – guitars
- Bengt Bäcke – bass
- Daniel Lidén – drums

(Reviews: Stonerrock.com Hellride Music Musiq Eduardo Rivadavia, Allmusic)

Agents of Ahriman (2007) – Small Stone Records

- **Oskar Cedermalm** (Truckfighters) – vocals
- Tommi Holappa – guitar
- **Jocke Ahslund** – keyboards
- Bengt Bäcke – bass
- **Erik Bäckwall** (ex-Dozer) – drums

(Reviews: Aural Innovations Metal Rules Eduardo Rivadavia, Allmusic)

Nest of Vipers (2012) – Small Stone Records

- Oskar Cedermalm – vocals
- Tommi Holappa – guitar
- **Johan Rockner** – guitar
- Bengt Bäcke – bass
- **Olle Mårthans** – drums

Trails & Passes (2014) – Small Stone Records

- **Arvid Hällagård** – vocals
- Tommi Holappa – guitar
- Bengt Bäcke – bass
- **Sebastian Olsson** – drums

(Reviews: The Evil Engineer)

Rise Above the Meadow (2016) – Napalm Records

- Arvid Hällagård – vocals
- Tommi Holappa – guitar
- **Johan Rockner** – bass
- Sebastian "Kongo" Olsson – drums

Hear the Rivers (2018) – Napalm Records

- Arvid Hällagård – vocals
- Tommi Holappa – guitar
- **Hans Fröhlich** – bass
- Sebastian Olsson – drums

Echoes from a Mass (2021) – Napalm Records

- Arvid Hällagård – vocals
- Tommi Holappa – guitar
- Hans Fröhlich – bass
- Sebastian Olsson – drums

(Reviews: Last Rites)

The Head & The Habit (2024) – Magnetic Eye Records

- Arvid Hällagård – vocals
- Tommi Holappa – guitar
- Hans Fröhlich – bass
- Sebastian Olsson – drums

=== Singles ===
- "Another Brick in the Wall, Pt. 3" / "Goodbye Cruel World" on The Wall [Redux] by Various Artists LP/CD (2018)
