= Call It Conspiracy =

Studio album by Dozer
- Released: 16 September 2003
- Recorded: Music-A-Matic Studio, Gothenburg; Polar Studios, Stockholm; Nord Studios Stockholm
- Genres: Stoner rock, stoner metal
- Length: 53:52
- Labels: Molten Universe; Heavy Psych Sounds Records (2020 reissue)
- Producer: Chips Kiesbye

Dozer chronology
Madre de Dios (2001)	Call It Conspiracy (2003)	Through the Eyes of Heathens (2005)

Singles from Call It Conspiracy
- 1. "Rising B/W the Wreck" Released: 2003

Reissue cover
- Heavy Psych Sounds 2020 reissue

Call It Conspiracy is the third studio album by the Swedish stoner rock band Dozer, released on 16 September 2003 through Molten Universe. The album was produced by Chips Kiesbye, known for his work with bands such as the Hellacopters and their album High Visibility, which was noted by Dozer as reason for wanting to work with him. The band released the 7" vinyl single "Rising B/W the Wreck" on November 24, 2003. In support of the album, Dozer toured with Clutch and Spiritual Beggars on the European leg of their Monstergroove 2003 tour. The album was reissued on March 20, 2020, through the label Heavy Psych Sounds Records.

== Background ==
In addition to adding piano played by Chips Kiesbye and organist Stefan Boman the band decided to use less fuzz distortion and experiment with different songwriting techniques and guitar tones. The result was noted in reviews of a more distinct heavy metal and punk rock style sound. In a 2020 interview lead guitarist Tommi Holappa shared a technical aspect which changed the bands sound stating "we decided to tune up our guitars half a step to make everything sound a little bit clearer." This made their previous compositional techniques of "slower moodier songs" and faster "punk" passages more pronounced by using the higher pitched guitar tuning range.

== Reception ==
Professional ratings
Review scores
Source	Rating
Ever Metal	9.5/10
Hellride Music	(Favourable) link
Metal Temple	8.5/10
Roadburn Reviews	(Unfavourable) link
Rock Hard	9.5/10
Visions	9.5/10

Reviews brought out a discernibly heavier sound which Ever Metal stated "This album is the heaviest, most “metal” work" of the band compared to the bands previous releases noting different styles incorporated in different tracks describing "The Hills Have Eyes" as "full throttle rock'n'roll" and "Man Made Mountain" being a "groove laden head-nodder". Visions also noted “Rising” as a driving, punk rocker" with an emphasis on the vocal lines and lyrics. Metal Temple made the observation that the song "The Exit" brings the punk power.

== Track listing ==
All tracks are written by Dozer

No.	Title	Length
1.	"The Hills Have Eyes"	4:04
2.	"Rising"	3:38
3.	"Feelgood Formula"	5:18
4.	"The Exit"	2:10
5.	"Spirit Fury Fire"	5:06
6.	"A Matter of Time"	3:25
7.	"Man Made Mountain"	4:50
8.	"Way to Redemption"	4:24
9.	"Crimson Highway"	3:01
10.	"Black Light Revolution"	5:28
11.	"Glorified"	3:46
12.	"Lightning Stalker"	5:47
Total length:		50:58

== Personnel ==
Dozer

- Fredrik Nordin (vocals, rhythm guitar)
- Tommi Holappa (lead guitar)
- Johan Rockner (bass)
- Erik Bäckwall (drums)

Additional musicians

- Chips Kiesbye (piano, percussion, noise)
- Stefan Boman (organ)

Production

- Dozer – Composer
- Stefan Boman – Engineer, Mixing
- Henrik Jonsson – Mastering
- Martin Jonsson – Photography
- Chips Kiesbye – Producer, Mixing
- Henryk Lipp – Assistant Engineer
- Martin Stangefelt – Cover Design
