= Daniel Lidén =

Swedish drummer and music producer

- Birth name: Karl Daniel Lidén
- Also known as: Jack Frank
- Born: December 1, 1980 (age 44); Sweden
- Genres: Rock; psychedelic; metal; punk
- Occupations: Musician; producer; engineer
- Instruments: Keyboards; percussion
- Years active: 1998–present
- Labels: Molten Universe; Small Stone; Magnetic Eye; Napalm; Blues Funeral; Heavy Psych Sounds
- Member of: Vaka; The Old Wind; A Swarm Of The Sun
- Formerly of: Demon Cleaner; Dozer; Greenleaf
- Website: karldanielliden.com

Karl Daniel Lidén is a Swedish drummer and music producer. He was the drummer for rock bands Dozer, Demon Cleaner and Greenleaf. He currently has a solo project called Vaka.

== Career ==
=== Demon Cleaner ===
Lidén was a founding member of Demon Cleaner, a stoner rock band from Borlange. They released two full-length albums and disbanded in 2002 soon after Lidén left the band.

=== Greenleaf ===
While a member of Demon Cleaner Lidén started a side project with Tommi Holappa (Dozer guitar player) and Bengt Bäcke (producer for Dozer and Demon Cleaner) called Greenleaf. They released two albums and an ep with Lidén.

=== Dozer ===
Soon after leaving Demon Cleaner, Lidén joined Dozer. He joined after the recording of their third album, Call It Conspiracy. He toured with the band in support of that album and then appeared on their next album Through the Eyes of Heathens before leaving.

=== Vaka ===
Originally called And Machine Said.. Behold:, Vaka is Lidén's solo project. Vaka has released one album, Kappa Delta Phi (2008). The album was produced by Lidén and features appearances by Johan Rockner (Dozer), Tommi Holappa (Dozer) and Peder Bergstrand (Lowrider, I Are Droid).

== Discography ==
=== Demon Cleaner ===
Split singles with Dozer

- Demon Cleaner vs Dozer (1998) – Molten Universe
- Hawaiian Cottage (1999) – Molten Universe
- Domestic Dudes (1999) – Molten Universe

Albums

- The Freeflight (2000) – Molten Universe
- Demon Cleaner (2002) – Molten Universe

=== Greenleaf ===
- Greenleaf ep (2000) – Molten Universe
- Revolution Rock (2001) – Molten Universe
- Secret Alphabets (2003) – Small Stone Records

=== Dozer ===
- Through the Eyes of Heathens (2006) – Small Stone Records

=== Vaka ===
- Kappa Delta Phi (2008) – Murkhouse Recordings

=== Other appearances ===
- Dozer – Exoskeleton Pt. I & II CD EP (2007) – Molten Universe Recordings – co-producer, engineer, mixer, mastering
- Dozer – Beyond Colossal (2008) – Small Stone Records – co-producer, engineer, mixer
- Switchblade – S/T [2009] (2009) – Trust No One Recordings – co-producer, engineer, mixer
- Kausal – In Dead Cities (2009) – Version Studio Records – engineer, mixer, mastering
- A Swarm of the Sun – Zenith (2010) – Version Studio Records – drums
- Digression Assassins – Alpha (2011) – Ampire Records – engineer, mixer
- Mr. Death – Descending Through Ashes (2011) – Agonia Records – producer, engineer, mixer
- Greenleaf – Nest of Vipers (2012) – Small Stone Records – engineer, mixer
- Propane Propane – Indigo (2012) – Planet Fuzz – mixer
- Doomina – Elsewhere (2012) – self-released – mastering
- Pig Eyes – Total Destruction of the Present Moment (2012) – De:Nihil Records – mastering
- Switchblade – S/T [2012] (2012) – Denovali Records / Trust No One Recordings – engineer, mixer
- Greenleaf – Trails & Passes (2014) – Small Stone Records – recording, mixer, mastering
- Draconian – Sovran (2015) – Napalm Records – vocals engineer
- Katatonia – The Fall of Hearts (2016) – Peaceville Records – recording, mixing for bonus tracks "Vakaren" and "Wide Awake In Quietus"
- Greenleaf – Rise Above The Meadow (2016) – Napalm Records – recording, mixer, mastering
- Bloodbath – The Arrow of Satan Is Drawn (2018) – Peaceville Records – mixer, mastering, recording (drums, vocals)
- Greenleaf – Hear The Rivers (2018) – Napalm Records – recording, mixer, mastering
- Katatonia – City Burials (2020) – Peaceville Records – recording
- Draconian – Under a Godless Veil (2020) – Napalm Records – mixing, mastering, drums recording
- Lowrider – Refractions (2020) – Blues Funeral Recordings – mixer, mastering
- Crippled Black Phoenix – Ellengæst (2020) – Season of Mist – co-producer, mixer, mastering
- Greenleaf – Echoes from a Mass (2021) – Napalm Records – engineer, mixer, mastering
- Dozer – Drifting in the Endless Void (2023) – Blues Funeral Recordings – co-producer, engineer, mixer and mastering
- Domkraft – Sonic Moons (2023) – Magnetic Eye Records – mixing, mastering
- The Ocean – Holocene (2023) – Pelagic Records – mixer, mastering
- A Swarm Of The Sun – An Empire (2024) – Pelagic Records – drums, mixer, mastering
- Greenleaf – The Head & The Habit (2024) – Magnetic Eye Records – producer, engineer, mixer, mastering
- Sandveiss – Standing in the Fire (2024) – Folivora Records – mixer, mastering
