= Freebird Records =

Dutch independent record label

Freebird Records is an independent record label, established in Eindhoven, Netherlands, in 1998. The label has specialized in stoner rock, but tries to release music by acts and artists that are on the edge of that genre. The label has signed with bands from the United States, Chile, Brazil, Sweden, Finland, Germany and Italy.

Freebird launched the acts of Dozer, Astrosoniq, Wallrus, Elephantum and Solace. The sub-label Under Her Black Wings was launched in 2005. It specializes in black metal and death metal.

Freebird has offices in Leiden, Netherlands, and Mönsterås, Sweden.
