= Dozer (band) =

Swedish stoner rock band

- Origin: Borlänge, Sweden
- Genres: Stoner rock; stoner metal
- Years active: 1995–present
- Labels: MeteorCity; Man's Ruin; Molten Universe; Small Stone; Heavy Psych Sounds
- Members: Fredrik Nordin; Tommi Holappa; Johan Rockner; Sebastian Olsson
- Past members: Magnus Larsson; Erik Bäckwall; Daniel Lidén; Olle Mårthans
- Website: dozermusic.com

Dozer is a Swedish stoner rock band, formed in Borlänge in 1995. The band's current line-up consists of vocalist and rhythm guitarist Fredrik Nordin, lead guitarist Tommi Holappa, bassist Johan Rockner and drummer Sebastian Olsson. Dozer has released six studio albums since their formation.

Dozer frequently tours and has played more than 300 live shows spanning several countries. They have toured and played with bands such as Mastodon, Rollins Band, Hellacopters, Spiritual Beggars, Clutch, Unida, Zeke, Nebula, Entombed.

== History ==
=== Early years ===
Dozer was formed in the great north in 1995 by Tommi Holappa, Fredrik Nordin, Erik Bäckwall and Magnus Larsson, playing local youth centres and supporting any bands that came to their hometown. In 1996 Magnus Larsson left and Johan Rockner joined the band. In 1998 the band recorded a split EP with the American band Unida. The EP was originally released by MeteorCity and re-issued in 2005.

=== Breakthrough and rise to success ===
While trying to secure a record deal they sent a demo tape to Man's Ruin Records, a highly influential label in the stoner rock scene at the time. Frank Kozik, the owner of Man's Ruin, was thoroughly impressed and the band quickly recorded an album. In 2000 Dozer released their first album In the Tail of a Comet, which was recorded for only $500. The band's second album Madre de Dios was released via Man's Ruin in 2001 along with a vinyl version on Molten Universe. Man's Ruin Records closed down shortly after the release.

For their third album they worked with top Swedish producer Chips Kiesbye, known for his work with bands such as The Hellacopters. Call It Conspiracy was released in 2003 on the local Molten Universe record label and was well received by the media. At this time the band also recorded a video for the single "Rising". Soon after the release of the album Erik Bäckwall left the band and was replaced by Daniel Lidén from Demon Cleaner.

=== Recent times ===
In 2005, Dozer recorded their fourth album Through the Eyes of Heathens at the Seawolf Studios in Helsinki. The album was released on Small Stone Records with whom they had signed on to earlier that year. The album includes the track "Until Man Exists No More" featuring guest vocals by Troy Sanders of Mastodon. Early in 2006 Lidén left the band and was replaced by Olle Mårthans.

Dozer released their fifth album, Beyond Colossal in late 2008, recorded and mixed by Daniel Lidén, and guest vocals by Neil Fallon of Clutch. The band followed it up with a short European tour.

In November 2009, Dozer played what, according to their guitarist Tommi Holappa, could very well be their last show. They went on an indefinite hiatus due to vocalist Fredrik Nordin going back to school, with the other members continuing with different side projects.

On 21 November 2012, the band announced on its website that it was active again, having booked several shows.

In 2022, Olle Mårthans left the band's drummer position and was replaced by Sebastian Olsson who also performed on Dozer's 2023 album, Drifting in the Endless Void.

On July 14 2023, Magnetic Eye Records released the album Superunknown (Redux) which featured all tracks in running order from Soundgarden's 1994 album Superunknown with Dozer performing the track "Half".

== Side projects ==
Fredrik Nordin, Tommi Holappa, Daniel Lidén, Erik Bäckwall and Johan Rockner formed the side project Greenleaf in 1999. Rockner and Bäckwall were part of another band called The Sick. They have released two albums, ...and the Hell With It! in 2001 on Molten Universe and Fast from the Past in 2014. The pair are also are members of heavy doom rock band Besvärjelsen, releasing their second album 2022 on Magnetic Eye Records. Lidén had a newer band called Vaka, formerly called And Machine Said.. Behold:. They released one album, Kappa Delta Phi, in 2008 on Murkhouse Recordings.

== Members ==
- Fredrik Nordin – vocals, rhythm guitar
- Tommi Holappa – lead guitar
- Johan Rockner – bass
- Sebastian Olsson – drums

=== Previous members ===
- Magnus Larsson – bass
- Erik Bäckwall – drums
- Daniel Lidén – drums
- Olle Mårthans – drums

== Discography ==
=== Studio albums ===
- In the Tail of a Comet (2000)
- Madre de Dios (2001)
- Call It Conspiracy (2003)
- Through the Eyes of Heathens (2006)
- Beyond Colossal (2008)
- Drifting in the Endless Void (2023)

=== EPs ===
- Dozer "Supersoul" on Man's Ruin Records, 10" EP (May/2000). 1,500 copies pressed on green vinyl.
- Coming Down The Mountain (1999, Split EP with Unida)
- Dozer vs. Demon Cleaner (1998)
- Demon Cleaner vs. Dozer: Domestic Dudes E.P. (1999)
- Dozer vs. Demon Cleaner: Hawaiian Cottage E.P. (1999)
- Vultures (2013)

=== Compilation albums ===
- Rewind to Return: Rarities, Singles and B-Sides (2025)

=== Singles ===
- "The Phantom" (2000)
- "Sonic Reducer" (split with Los Natas) (2002)
- "Day of the Rope" (2002)
- "Rising" (2003)
- "Star by Star" (split with Giants of Science) (2004)
- "Exoskeleton" (split with Brain Police) (2007)

=== Compilation appearances ===
- "Supersoul" Welcome to MeteorCity (MeteorCity, 1998)
- "Mammoth Mountain" A Fist Full of Freebird (Freebird Records, 1998)
- "She" on Graven Images, A Tribute to the Misfits (Freebird Records, 1999)
- "Cupola" on Molten Universe Volume one
- "Mammoth Mountain" and "Typhoon" on NERVE!
- "Man Made Mountain" on The Ultimate Fuzzcollection Volume One CD (2004 Fuzzorama Records)
- A cover of Devo's "Mongoloid" on Sucking the 70's - Back in the Saddle Again (2006 Small Stone Records)
- "Drawing Dead" on NHL 2K7 video game
- "Half" on Superunknown (Redux) by Various Artists LP/CD (2023 Magnetic Eye Records)

== Videography ==
- "Rising" from Call It Conspiracy, edited by Johan Rockner
- "From Fire Fell" from Through the Eyes of Heathens, produced and edited by Johan Rockner
- "Empire's End" from Beyond Colossal, produced and edited by Johan Rockner
- "Ex-Human, Now Beast" from Drifting In The Endless Void
