= Emissions from the Monolith =

- Genre: Doom metal Sludge metal
- Dates: Late May
- Locations: Youngstown, Ohio, United States
- Years active: 1999–2007
- Founders: Greg Barratt
- Website: emissionsfromthemonolith.com

Emissions from the Monolith was an annual heavy metal festival that primarily featured stoner rock, doom metal and sludge metal bands, and was widely considered to be the premier heavy/doom/stoner/sludge metal festival in the US. The festival was entirely organized by Greg Barratt at the nyabinghi in Youngstown, Ohio. The festival completed its ninth year in 2007, at Emo's, in Austin, Texas. The festival was resurrected by Greg Barratt and scheduled for return in 2026 to westside bowl in Youngstown, Ohio.

== Bands featured by year ==
=== 1: April 14–15, 2000 ===
Rebreather, Spirit Caravan, Karma to Burn, Boulder, Red Giant, Mustache, Wicker Man, Penance, Six Sigma, Honeymaid, Throttlerod, Bottom, Bongzilla, Cuda, Tummler, Kung Pao, Nice Cat

=== 2: May 25–27, 2001 ===
Spirit Caravan, Bongzilla, Raging Slab, Earthride, Boulder, Warhorse, Disengage, Slow Horse, Red Giant, Oversoul, Tummler, Throttlerod, Penance, Cuda, Gonzalez, Kung Pao, Five Horse Johnson, Unorthodox, Halfway to Gone, Sunnshine, Rebreather, Plaster, Witch Mountain, Weedeater, Soulpreacher, Dragon Green, Burnout, Sea of Green, Pale Divine, Positraction, Shuteye, Rockcatcher, The Want, Raging Slab, Clock Eating Planet

=== 3: September 8–9, 2001 ===
(Festival held in Chicago, IL at the Double Door)

Weedeater, Boulder, Rebreather, Bongzilla, Sea of Green, Kung Pao, Men of Porn, Penance, Burnout, Warhorse, Place of Skulls, Cuda, Operator Generator, Red Giant, Dragon Green, Lung Brush, Suplecs, Dixie Witch, Wickerman, Nova Driver, Drunkenmaster, Kneel Drill

=== 4: May 24–26, 2002 ===
Spirit Caravan, Disengage, Stinking Lizaveta, Red Giant, Men of Porn (2 sets), Wooly Mammoth, Black Mantra, The Atomic Bitchwax, Weedeater, Penance, Boulder, Rammer, Rebreather, Dragon Green, Jumbo's Killcrane, Fistula, Sofa King Killer, Bruahaha, Orange Goblin, Alabama Thunderpussy, Bottom, JJ Paradise Player's Club, Milligram, Kung Pao, Tummler, Lost Goat, Dixie Witch, The Brought Low, Burnout, Lamont, The Rubes

=== 5: May 23–25, 2003 ===
Halfway to Gone, Tummler, Penance, Throttlerod, Erik Larson Band, All Night, RPG, Floor, The Atomic Bitchwax, Mastodon, Weedeater, Boulder, Scissorfight, Bongzilla, Acid Ape, Keelhaul, Meatjack, Gil Mantera's Party Dream, Rwake, Fistula, Abdullah, Burnout, The Hidden Hand, Solace, Acid King, Disengage, JJ Paradise Player's Club, Stinking Lizaveta, Dixie Witch, Lo Freq, Volume, Pelican, The Rubes, Red Giant, Sofa King Killer, The Formula

=== 6: May 28–30, 2004 ===
Five Horse Johnson, A Thousand Knives of Fire, Beaten Back to Pure, Puddy, Zebulon Pike, Swarm of the Lotus, Delicious, Unsane, Meatjack, Tummler, Red Giant, Solace, Bongzilla, RPG, Kylesa, Starchild, Alabama Thunderpussy, Poobah, Dixie Witch, Kung Pao, Stinking Lizaveta, Rebreather, The Brought Low, Rwake, Buried at Sea, The Mighty Nimbus, Orange Goblin, Mastodon, Weedeater, Keelhaul, Pelican, Dozer, Dove, Lamont, Yob, Fistula, Cudamantra, Trephine; Place of Skulls and The Hidden Hand played back-to-back resulting in a brief Saint Vitus reunion jam.

=== 7: May 26–29, 2005 ===
Bible of the Devil, Electro Quarterstaff, Test-Site, King Valley, Amplified Heat, GreatDayForUp, Dixie Witch, Darediablo, Torche, Fistula, Mouth of the Architect, Beaten Back to Pure, Pale Divine, Devil to Pay, Raging Slab, Weedeater, Alabama Thunderpussy, Honky, Sons of Otis, Rebreather, Rwake, Roadsaw, Lamont, Delicious, Hope and Suicide, Minsk, Eyehategod, Today Is the Day, Pig Destroyer, Keelhaul, Meatjack, Stinking Lizaveta, Yob, Solace, Player's Club, Debris Inc., Disengage, Lair of the Minotaur, Witchcraft. SuperHeavyGoatAss.

=== 8: May 25–28, 2006 ===
Stinking Lizaveta, Kylesa, Graves at Sea, Conifer, Rosetta, Ultralord, Orange Goblin, Scissorfight, Electro Quarterstaff, Facedowninshit, Burnout, Rue, Colour Haze, Dixie Witch, Grief, Brought Low, Lamont, Low Divide, Baroness, Village of Dead Roads, Boris, Sunn O))), The Atomic Bitchwax, Weedeater, Rwake, Tummler, A Thousand Knives of Fire, Minsk, Trephine, Hyatari, Unfortunaut, Grey, We're All Gonna Die, Year Long Disaster

=== 9: May 25–27, 2007 ===
(Festival moves to Austin, TX at Emo's)

Kylesa, Amplified Heat, The Makai, Damnweevil, SuperHeavyGoatAss, Samothrace, Throttlerod, Mess with the Bull, Bible of the Devil, Test-Site, Valkyrie, Beast, Lord, Lord by Fire, Imperial Battlesnake, Dixie Witch, Middian, RPG, Minsk, Indian, Unfortunaut, Collapsar, Giant Squid, Blue Cheer, Weedeater, Rwake, Black Cobra, Delicious, Skeletonwitch, Deadbird, Suzukiton, Hognose

=== 10: October 8–11, 2026 ===
(Festival moves to Westside Bowl, Youngstown, OH)

Axioma, Bat, Bongzilla, Cavity, Deadbird, Disengage, Edhochuli, Faerie Ring, Fistula, Generation of Vipers, Great Falls, Horseburner, Howling Giant, Kowloon Walled City, Lake Lake, Lo-Pan, Minsk, O.I.L., Rebreather, Rwake, Shun, Solace, Stinking Lizaveta, Sunrot, Telekinetic Yeti, The Brought Low, Thunderchief, Today Is the Day, Torche, Voivod, Weedeater, Winds of Neptune.
