= Sofa King Killer =

American sludge metal band

- Origin: Akron, Ohio, U.S.
- Genres: Sludge metal, stoner metal
- Years active: 1999–2009
- Labels: At A Loss Recordings; Tee Pee Records; Retribute Records; Shifty Records
- Members: Brad Thorla; Chris Chiera; Paul Bartholet; Ryan Burgy
- Past members: Matt Bremkamp; Mike Burns

Sofa King Killer was an American sludge metal band from Akron, Ohio.

== Biography ==
Sofa King Killer's (abbreviated as SKK) vision was to create a hybrid band of different genres including doom metal, sludge metal, rock and roll and punk rock. The band was known for guitar riffs inspired by Black Sabbath, drums of the Melvins and the vocals of Eyehategod.

Forming in 1999, Sofa King Killer was part of the Akron and Cleveland heavy metal scene. They played in Greater Cleveland, Ohio with the likes of Abdullah, Boulder, Fistula, Keelhaul, Rebreather, and Rue. They were associated to bands such as Alabama Thunderpussy, Beaten Back To Pure, Mugwart and Weedeater mainly for their sludge metal sound inspired by southern rock.

In 2000, Sofa King Killer released Stout-Soaked Songs independently. Shifty Records (USA) discovered them and set up plans to release a Mini CD with the sludge metal band Fistula. Around the same time of this release Gary, owner of Shifty Records (USA) sent a demo of Stout-Soaked songs to Tony Presedo of Tee Pee Records to be released as a split EP with Leechmilk from Atlanta, Georgia in 2001.

After the release of Leechmilk/Sofa King Killer split EP they went on several short tours along the east coast with sludge metal band Fistula. They played with bands such as Beaten Back To Pure, Slow Horse, Molehill, Mugwart and Weedeater. At the time, members of Sofa King Killer and Gary from Shifty Records (USA) booked the first set of tours before their next release.

In 2002, Sofa King Killer released Lust Crimes And Holiness with record label At A Loss Recordings. Shortly after this release Sofa King Killer signed with UK label Retribute Records and toured the west coast booked by Thunderdome Booking Agency in support of their Midnight Magic album release. They set out on a lengthy tour with sludge metal pioneers 16 as an opening act which would be their last tour of the West Coast only to play local and regional shows until the band broke up in 2009.

== Discography ==
=== Albums ===
- Stout-Soaked Songs (CD) - DIY, 2000
- Midnight Magic (CD) - Retribute Records, 2004

=== Split CDs & EPs ===
- Sofa King Killer/Fistula (CD) - Shifty Records (USA), 2000
- Leechmilk/Sofa King Killer (CD) - Tee Pee Records, 2001
- Lust Crimes And Holiness (CD) - At A Loss Recordings, 2003
