= Stay Awake (Mike Scheidt album) =

Studio album by Mike Scheidt
- Released: June 19, 2012
- Genre: Alt-rock
- Length: 42:47
- Label: Thrill Jockey

Professional ratings
Aggregate scores
Source	Rating
Metacritic	36/100
Review scores
Source	Rating
Blurt Magazine	7/10
PopMatters	3/10

Stay Awake is the debut album from Middian and Yob lead-vocalist Mike Scheidt. It was released in June 2012 under Thrill Jockey records.

== Track listing ==
All tracks are written by Mike Scheidt

No.	Title	Length
1.	"When Time Forgets Time"	6:59
2.	"Until the End of Everything"	4:49
3.	"In Your Light"	4:36
4.	"The Price"	8:54
5.	"Breathe"	12:26
6.	"Stay Awake"	5:03
