= Gretzky (disambiguation) =

Wayne Gretzky is a retired National Hockey League player.

Gretzky may also refer to:

- Gretzky (surname) (Russian Грецкий), a Belarusian and Russian surname of Polish aristocratic origin
- Gretzky (album), an album by Electro Quarterstaff
- Wayne Gretzky Drive, a freeway in Edmonton, Canada
- Hlinka Gretzky Cup, an ice hockey tournament
