= Our Raw Heart =

Studio album by YOB
- Released: June 8, 2018
- Recorded: 2017–2018
- Genre: Doom metal; stoner metal; post-metal
- Length: 73:16
- Label: Relapse Records

YOB chronology
Clearing the Path to Ascend (2014)	Our Raw Heart (2018)

Professional ratings
Aggregate scores
Source	Rating
Metacritic	82/100
Review scores
Source	Rating
AllMusic	4.5/5 stars
Exclaim!	(8/10)
Metal Injection	(9/10)
Metal Storm	(8.0/10)
Pitchfork	(8/10)
Rolling Stone	(3.5/5)

Our Raw Heart is the eighth studio album by American doom metal band YOB. It was released June 8, 2018, by Relapse Records.

== Production ==
The album was produced by Billy Barnett. The album was inspired by a serious health issue suffered by singer and guitarist Mike Scheidt in early 2017, and most of the music was written while he was in a hospital bed. The album has been described as a cross between the band's two previous studio albums, mixing the aggression of Atma (2011) with the psychedelic experimentation of Clearing the Path to Ascend (2014). AllMusic classified it as a doom metal album "possessed of hope", with elements of sludge metal, stoner metal and post-metal psychedelia.

== Critical reception ==
Our Raw Heart was well received by critics. At Metacritic, which assigns a weighted average rating out of 100 to reviews from mainstream publications, this release received an average score of 82 based on 10 reviews. Aggregator Album of the Year gave the release a 83 out of 100 based on a critical consensus of 9 reviews.

Metal Injection called the album "engaging and revealing, immediately appealing but with subtle nuances and layers that only become apparent after subsequent listens. It's a powerful and cathartic release," while Rolling Stone praised the band for "subvert[ing] doom's bleak conventions, painting the genre's slowpoke churn with uplifting melodies, cosmic textures and Scheidt's existential howl like a dreampop Dio." NPR Music said about the album: "the lightness is devastating."

== Accolades ==
Publication	Accolade	Rank	Ref.
Decibel	Decibel's Top 40 Albums of 2018	1	
Consequence of Sound	Top 25 Metal + Hard Rock Albums of 2018	1	
Metal Injection	Top 20 Albums of 2018	5	
Vulture.com	15 Best Albums of 2018	12	

== Track list ==
No.	Title	Length
1.	"Ablaze"	10:13
2.	"The Screen"	9:49
3.	"In Reverie"	9:43
4.	"Lungs Reach"	5:39
5.	"Beauty in Falling Leaves"	16:27
6.	"Original Face"	7:03
7.	"Our Raw Heart"	14:22
Total length:		73:16

== Personnel ==
- Mike Scheidt – vocal, guitars
- Aaron Rieseberg – bass
- Travis Foster – drums

Additional musicians

- Billy Barnett – piano

== Charts ==
Chart performance for Our Raw Heart
Chart (2018)	Peak position
US Top Hard Rock Albums (Billboard)	20
US Top Album Sales (Billboard)	37
US Independent Albums (Billboard)	9
US Vinyl Albums (Billboard)	3
