= Out of a Center Which Is Neither Dead nor Alive =

Out of a Center Which Is Neither Dead Nor Alive

Studio album by Minsk
- Released: 2005
- Recorded: 2005
- Genres: Doom metal, post-metal
- Length: 64:58
- Label: At a Loss Recordings
- Producer: Sanford Parker

Minsk chronology
| Out of a Center Which Is Neither Dead Nor Alive (2005) | With Echoes in the Movement of Stone (2007) |

Out of a Center Which Is Neither Dead Nor Alive is the debut full-length album by Chicago-based post-metal band Minsk. Produced by Sanford Parker, the album was released in 2005 on At a Loss Recordings.

== Critical reaction ==
In a review of the album, AllMusic's Greg Prato wrote: "Although the group has obvious roots in metal (as evidenced by tracks like 'Narcotics and Dissecting Knives'), Minsk has plenty of tricks up its sleeve, such as the sonic hodgepodge 'Holy Flower of the North Star' (a track custom-made for listening to on headphones)." Phil Freeman of The Wire remarked: "What's most striking about this music is how adeptly it subverts or sidesteps metal's traditional insistence on catharsis. It's New Age music of a sort: it fills the room, and it's often quite beautiful, but its ebb and flow are so regular and smooth that it acts as a sedative rather than a stimulant." It was ranked the 17th best metal album of 2005 by PopMatters, whose Adrien Begrand called the album a "mind-blowing, richly textured debut" and "the cream of this year’s avant crop." Jeff Pizek of Daily Herald said that the album's songs have "no catchy harmonies or sing-along choruses, but plenty of blissful textures are woven among the downtrodden loping."

== Track listing ==
| No. | Title | Length |
|---|---|---|
| 1. | "Waging War on the Forevers" | 10:40 |
| 2. | "Narcotics and Dissecting Knives" | 10:57 |
| 3. | "Holy Flower of the North Star" | 14:18 |
| 4. | "Three Hours" | 11:10 |
| 5. | "Bloodletting and Forgetting" | 8:25 |
| 6. | "Wisp of Tow" | 9:28 |
| Total length: | | 64:58 |
