= If You Walk Before You Crawl, You Crawl Before You Die =

Studio album by Rwake
- Released: July 10, 2004
- Studio: Volume Studios
- Genre: Sludge metal
- Length: 40:59
- Label: At A Loss Records
- Producer: Sanford Parker

Rwake chronology
Hell Is a Door to the Sun (2002)	If You Walk Before You Crawl, You Crawl Before You Die (2004)	Voices of Omens (2007)

If You Walk Before You Crawl, You Crawl Before You Die is the third full-length album release by American sludge band Rwake. It was released on July 10, 2004, through At a Loss Records. This album marks the debut of Kiffin on guitars, replacing Chuck Schaaf, who left to form Deadbird.

== Reception ==
AllMusic noted, "With their inventive and unpredictable 2004 album, If You Walk Before You Crawl, You Crawl Before You Die, Arkansas natives Rwake do a fair job of putting their oft-overlooked state on the heavy metal map."

Stereogum remarked about the album, stating it "finds the band venturing even further off the beaten path. Its songs feel diseased, somehow — mired in darkness and choked out by briar thorns and hissing ambient noise."

== Track listing ==
No.	Title	Length
1.	"Dying Spiral Galaxies"	7:08
2.	"Forge"	6:02
3.	"Embedded"	5:18
4.	"Intro"	0:43
5.	"Sleep and Forget Forever"	4:50
6.	"Woodson Lateral"	4:32
7.	"If You Walk Before You Crawl, You Crawl Before You Die"	12:21

== Personnel ==
- Recorded by Sanford Parker at Volume Studios in Chicago
- C.T.: (Vocals)
- Gravy: (Guitar)
- Kiffin: Guitar
- Reid: (Bass)
- Jeff Morgan (Drums)
- Brittany: (Moog, Vocals, Samples)
