= Amerijuanican =

Studio album by Bongzilla
- Released: September 27, 2005
- Recorded: 2005
- Genre: Stoner metal
- Length: 43:05
- Label: Relapse
- Producer: Bongzilla, Wendy Schneider

Bongzilla chronology
Gateway (2002)	Amerijuanican (2005)	Weedsconsin (2021)

Professional ratings
Review scores
Source	Rating
AllMusic	3.5/5 stars
Blabbermouth	7/10 stars
Rock Hard	8/10 stars
MetalReviews	(60/100)

Amerijuanican is the fourth full-length album by stoner metal band Bongzilla. It was released in September 2005 by Relapse Records. The album title is a portmanteau of the words "American" and "marijuana". It is the band's only album to feature "Dixie" Dave Collins on bass. The song "Champagne & Reefer" is a cover of blues musician Muddy Waters.

== Track listing ==
- All songs written by Bongzilla, except where noted.

No.	Title	Music	Length
1.	"Amerijuanican"		6:46
2.	"Kash Under Glass"		4:22
3.	"Tri-Pack Master"		3:05
4.	"Cutdown"		6:59
5.	"Weedy Woman"		4:24
6.	"Stonesphere"		12:26
7.	"Champagne & Reefer" (McKinley Morganfield cover)	McKinley Morganfield	4:46
Total length:			43:05

== Production ==
- Produced by Bongzilla & Wendy Schneider
- Recorded, engineered & mixed by Wendy Schneider
- Mastered by Daniel Stout

== Personnel ==
- Mike "Muleboy" Makela - guitars, vocals
- Jeff "Spanky" Schultz - guitars
- "Dixie" Dave Collins - bass
- Mike "Magma" Henry - drums, percussion
