= The Unreal Never Lived =

Studio album by YOB
- Released: August 23, 2005
- Recorded: March–April 2005
- Genre: Doom metal, stoner metal
- Length: 51:48
- Label: Metal Blade

YOB chronology
The Illusion of Motion (2004)	The Unreal Never Lived (2005)	The Great Cessation (2009)

Professional ratings
Review scores
Source	Rating
Pitchfork Media	8/10 stars
AllMusic	4/5 stars
Blabbermouth	8/10 stars
Rock Hard	8/10 stars
Lambgoat	8/10 stars
Sea of Tranquility	4/5 stars

The Unreal Never Lived is the fourth full-length album by American band YOB. It was released in August 2005 under Metal Blade.

== Track listing ==
No.	Title	Length
1.	"Quantum Mystic"	10:58
2.	"Grasping Air"	9:02
3.	"Kosmos"	10:25
4.	"The Mental Tyrant"	21:23
Total length:		51:48

== Personnel ==
Music

- Mike Scheidt - vocals, guitars
- Isamu Sato - bass, vocals (track 4)
- Travis Foster - drums

Production

- Billy Barnett - mastering, mixing
- Mike Schiedt - mixing, mastering
