= Midnight (band) =

American metal band

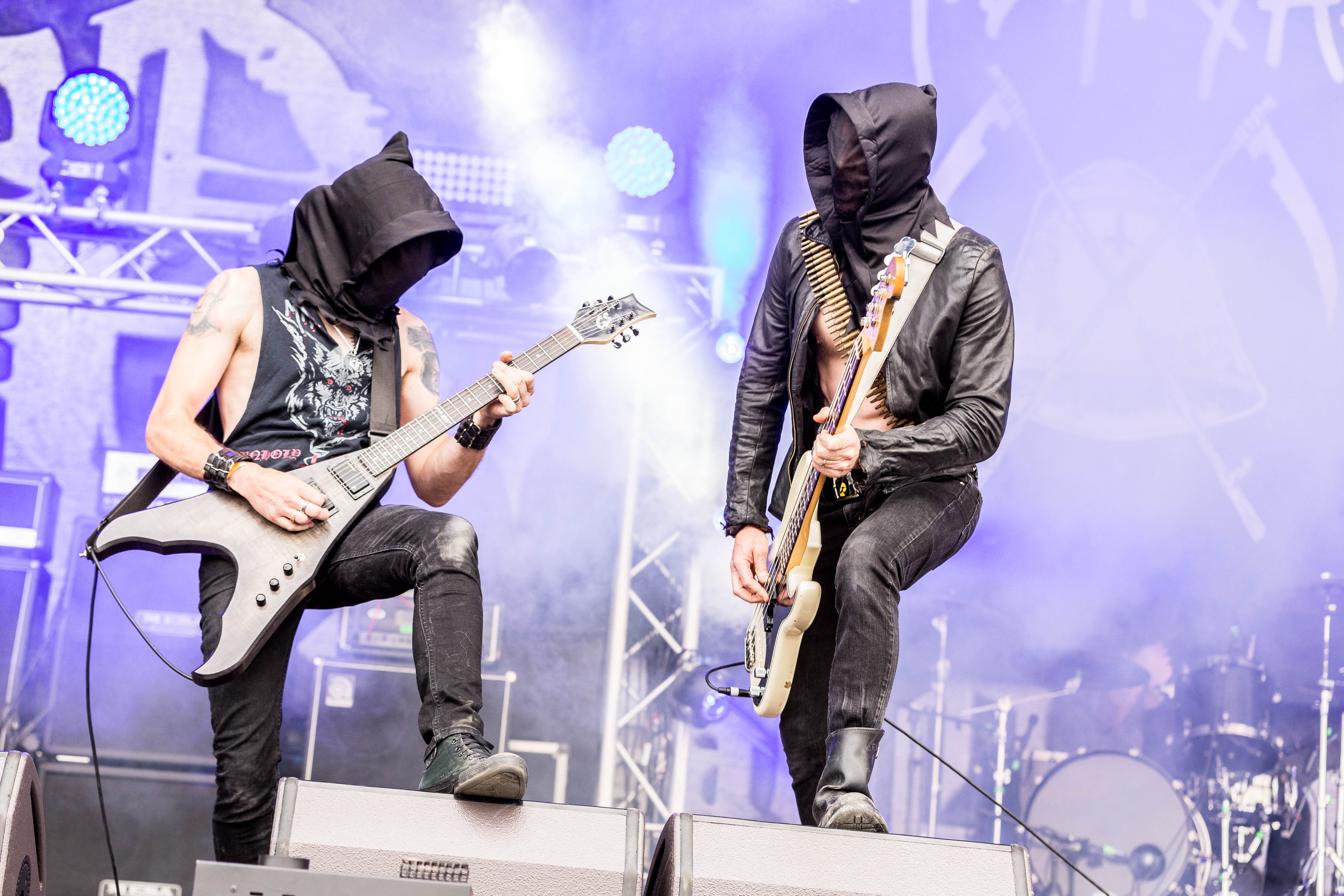
- Midnight playing at Party.San Open Air 2019

Background information
- Origin: Cleveland, Ohio, U.S.
- Genre: Black n' roll
- Years active: 2003–present
- Labels: Hells Headbangers, Metal Blade
- Website: midnightviolators.com

Midnight is an American band that plays a mixture of black metal, speed metal and punk, a style referred to as black n' roll. It was formed as a solo project by Jamie Walters in 2003 in Cleveland, Ohio. Walters, under the pseudonym Athenar, is the only constant member of the band. While he performs vocals and all instruments in studio recordings, he is accompanied by different musicians during live performances. During their live performances, musicians cover their faces with hoods.

== History ==
After the breakup of the punk band Boulder, Jamie Walters founded Midnight as a solo project in Cleveland, Ohio in 2003. Shortly afterwards, the band's first demo was released, followed by numerous self-produced singles and EPs. In 2011, Midnight's debut album Satanic Royalty was released on Hells Headbangers Records. After two more studio albums, Midnight was signed to Metal Blade Records in 2019. The band went on to release their fourth studio album Rebirth by Blasphemy in the same year. Their fifth studio album Let There Be Witchery was released in 2022, also on Metal Blade. In 2020, the music magazine Rock Hard named Midnight one of the "20 hottest bands" of the 2020s.

On May 23, 2025, Midnight released “Steel, Rust and Disgust.” It was a cover album which included ten cover songs and two brand new songs.

Midnight has been noted for their live performances; Walters himself describes them as "unfiltered wildness". During his performances, he is accompanied by various live musicians who appear under constantly changing pseudonyms. Some early live musicians included Shaun Filley (ex-NunSlaughter) and Bob Zeiger.

== Discography ==
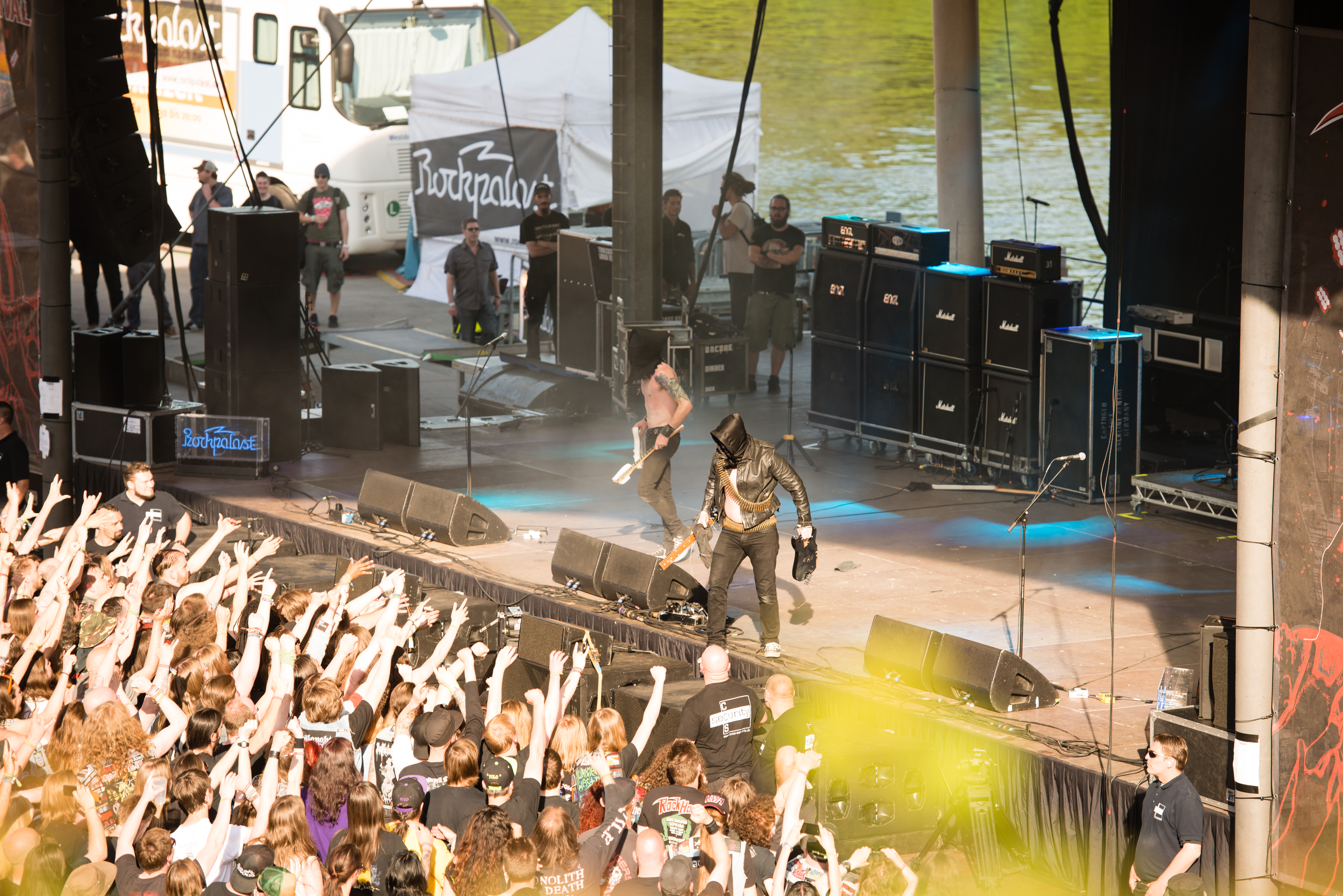
Midnight at Rock Hard Open Air in Germany, 2014

=== Studio albums ===
- 2011: Satanic Royalty (Hells Headbangers)
- 2014: No Mercy for Mayhem (Hells Headbangers)
- 2017: Sweet Death and Ecstasy (Hells Headbangers)
- 2019: Rebirth by Blasphemy (Metal Blade Records)
- 2022: Let There Be Witchery (Metal Blade Records)
- 2024: Hellish Expectations (Metal Blade Records)
- 2025: Steel, Rust and Disgust (Metal Blade Records)

=== Compilations ===
- 2006: Complete and Total Fucking Midnight (Nuclear War Now! Productions)
- 2009: Berlin is Burning (Nuclear War Now! Productions)
- 2012: Complete and Total Hell (Hells Headbangers)
- 2017: Shox of Violence (Hells Headbangers)

=== Demos ===
- 2003: Midnight (self-released)
- 2004: Leather Sleeve Demo (self-released)
- 2012: Satanic Royalty Demos (Say Hello to Mr Fist Records)
- 2015: No Mercy for Mayhem Demos (Home Taping Cruelties)

=== Extended plays ===
- 2003: Funeral Bell (Outlaw Recordings)
- 2007: Midnight Violates You Live! (live EP, self-released)
- 2013: Alive on the Streets of Cleveland! (live EP, Outlaw Recordings)
- 2021: Rehearsal Vomits (Chained Records)
- 2023: Haunting the Masonic (live EP, self-released)
