= Clearing the Path to Ascend =

Studio album by YOB
- Released: September 4, 2014
- Genre: Doom metal, sludge metal
- Length: 62:30
- Label: Neurot

YOB chronology
Atma (2011)	Clearing the Path to Ascend (2014)	Our Raw Heart (2018)

Professional ratings
Aggregate scores
Source	Rating
Metacritic	85/100
Review scores
Source	Rating
AllMusic	4/5 stars
The A.V. Club	B+
Blabbermouth	9/10
Exclaim!	8/10
Kerrang!	4/5 stars
Metal Hammer	3.5/5 stars
MetalSucks	4.5/5 stars
musicOMH	4/5 stars
Pitchfork	8.2/10
Sputnikmusic	2.8/5

Clearing the Path to Ascend is the seventh studio album by American doom metal band YOB. It was released in September 2014 under Neurot Recordings. Rolling Stone named it the best metal album and the 50th best album overall of the year.

== Track listing ==
No.	Title	Length
1.	"In Our Blood"	16:56
2.	"Nothing to Win"	11:21
3.	"Unmask the Spectre"	15:25
4.	"Marrow"	18:48
Total length:		62:30

== Personnel ==
YOB

- Mike Scheidt – vocal, guitars
- Aaron Rieseberg – bass
- Travis Foster – drums

Additional musicians

- Billy Barnett – hammond organ

Production

- Billy Barnett – engineer
- Brad Boatright – mastering

Design

- Orion Landau – artwork
