= Methods for Attaining Extreme Altitudes =

EP by Bongzilla
- Released: January 27, 1998
- Recorded: 1997
- Genre: Stoner metal
- Length: 25:50
- Label: Relapse
- Producer: Ralph Alberts, Bongzilla

Bongzilla chronology
Methods for Attaining Extreme Altitudes (1998)	Stash (1999)

Methods for Attaining Extreme Altitudes is the debut EP by stoner metal band Bongzilla. It was released on 12" vinyl only in January 1998 by Relapse Records. In 2007, it was re-released by Modus Operandi on green vinyl. This same year Relapse released it on CD for the first time and packaged it with Stash.

== Track listing ==
1. "Melovespot" – 6:58
2. "High Like a Dog" – 5:10
3. "Smoke/I Love Maryjane" – 13:42
