= Mike Scheidt =

Musician

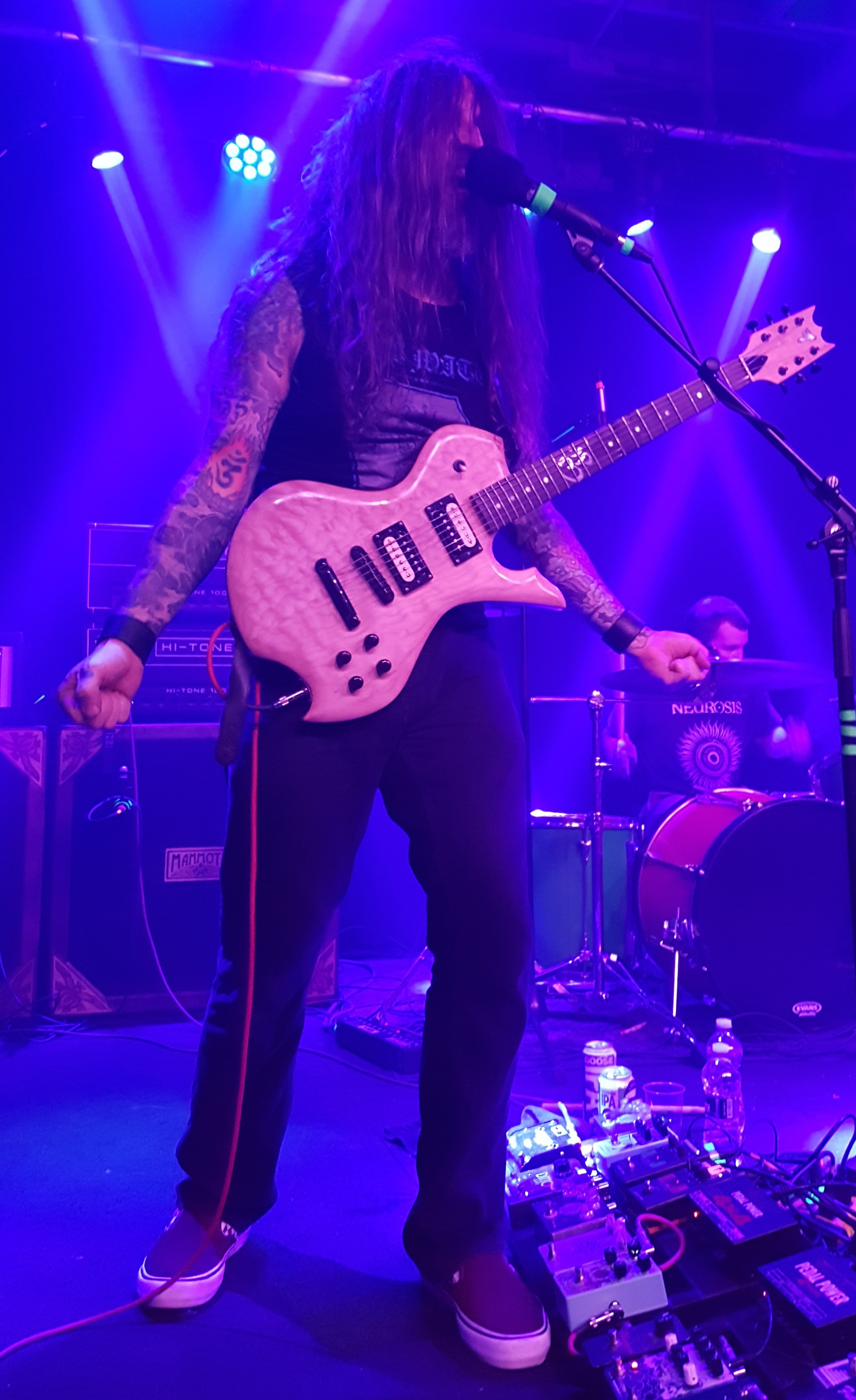
- Mike Scheidt Performing with YOB at El Club, Detroit, 2018.

Background information
- Born: September 1, 1970 (age 56); Eugene, Oregon, U.S.
- Genres: Doom metal
- Occupation: Musician
- Instruments: Vocals; Guitar
- Years active: 1996–present
- Labels: Metal Blade; Phat Sausage Farm; Global Ambition

Michael Scheidt (born September 1, 1970) is the guitarist and lead vocalist of doom metal band YOB.

== Biography ==
Mike Scheidt helped create YOB in 2000, which disbanded in 2006 and then reformed in 2008. Before they disbanded, YOB released a demo and four albums. YOB has shared the stage with other important underground acts like Electric Wizard, High on Fire, Isis, and The Locust as well. He was also in the side project of YOB, which was named H.C. Minds. H.C. Minds have released one full-length album, one EP, and a split album with the band dot(.). Scheidt went on to form the band Middian with Will Lindsay bass and vocals, Scott Headrick on drums, and himself on guitar after YOB split up. When asked about the new sound compared to YOB, Mike replied, "[It] isn't YOB 2.0... Middian is more mid-paced and meaner on average, though there are definite slow doom parts for sure. My singing is as varied as ever, but somehow seems different from YOB. Plus, my bandmates bring their own influences into the mix." Middian released one album, titled Age Eternal. Scheidt then reformed YOB after Middian broke up following a legal dispute over the band name. YOB have since released four further albums.

Scheidt's first solo album, Stay Awake, was released in 2012 and features acoustic guitar, a departure from Scheidt's usual instrument. The inspiration for going acoustic came when he saw Scott Kelly of Neurosis play acoustic.

In 2012, Scheidt formed VHÖL with John Cobbett, Sigrid Sheie, and Aesop Dekker. The band's eponymous debut was released by Profound Lore Records on 9 April 2013.

== Influences ==
Scheidt has said his main influences have been Neurosis, Tool, Black Sabbath, Saint Vitus, Immolation, Soundgarden, Deep Purple, The Obsessed, Trouble and Pentagram. His vocal style is inspired by Lee Dorrian's work in Cathedral and the lower pitched vocals of Solstice.

== Discography ==
=== With H.C. Minds ===
- Superficial Worlds (full-length, 1999)
- dot(.)/H.C. Minds split (split, 2003)
- Who Can Survive (EP, 2003)

=== With YOB ===
- YOB Demo, 2000
- Elaborations of Carbon (full-length, 2002)
- Catharsis (full-length, 2003)
- The Illusion of Motion (full-length, 2004)
- The Unreal Never Lived (full-length, 2005)
- The Great Cessation (full-length, 2009)
- Atma (full-length, 2011)
- Clearing the Path to Ascend (full-length, 2014)
- Our Raw Heart (full-length, 2018)

=== With Middian ===
- Age Eternal (full-length, 2007)

=== With VHÖL ===
- VHÖL (full-length, 2013)
- Deeper Than Sky (full-length, 2015)

=== With James Romig ===
- James Romig: The Complexity of Distance (full-length, 2023)

=== Solo ===
- Stay Awake (full-length, 2012)

=== Lumbar ===
- The First and Last Days of Unwelcome (full-length, 2013)
