= Apogee (Bongzilla album) =

Studio album / live album by Bongzilla
- Released: May 16, 2000
- Venue: Live tracks 4–5 recorded at Weedstock; tracks 6–7 recorded at Great Midwest Marijuana Harvest Festival
- Studio: Coney Island Studio, Madison, Wisconsin (tracks 1–3)
- Genre: Stoner metal
- Length: 48:38
- Label: Ritual, Howling Bull America
- Producer: Wendy Schneider, Bongzilla

Bongzilla chronology
Stash (1999)	Apogee (2000)	Gateway (2002)

Professional ratings
Review scores
Source	Rating
AllMusic	3.5/5 stars

Apogee is the second full-length album by stoner metal band Bongzilla. The album was released in May 2000 by Ritual Records, and re-released in 2004 by Relapse Records. It contains three songs recorded in the studio and four recorded at a live concert.

== Track listing ==
No.	Title	Length
1.	"H.P. Keefmaker"	10:26
2.	"Salvation"	5:42
3.	"Grim Reefer"	10:43
4.	"Witch Weed" (live)	6:37
5.	"Dealer McDope" (live)	6:07
6.	"Sacred Smoke" (live)	5:03
7.	"American" (live)	4:00
Total length:		48:38
