= Shifty Records (United States) =

Shifty Records is an independent record label in the United States specializing in metal. It produces music by bands such as Boulder.

== See also ==
- List of record labels
