= Bongzilla =

American stoner metal band

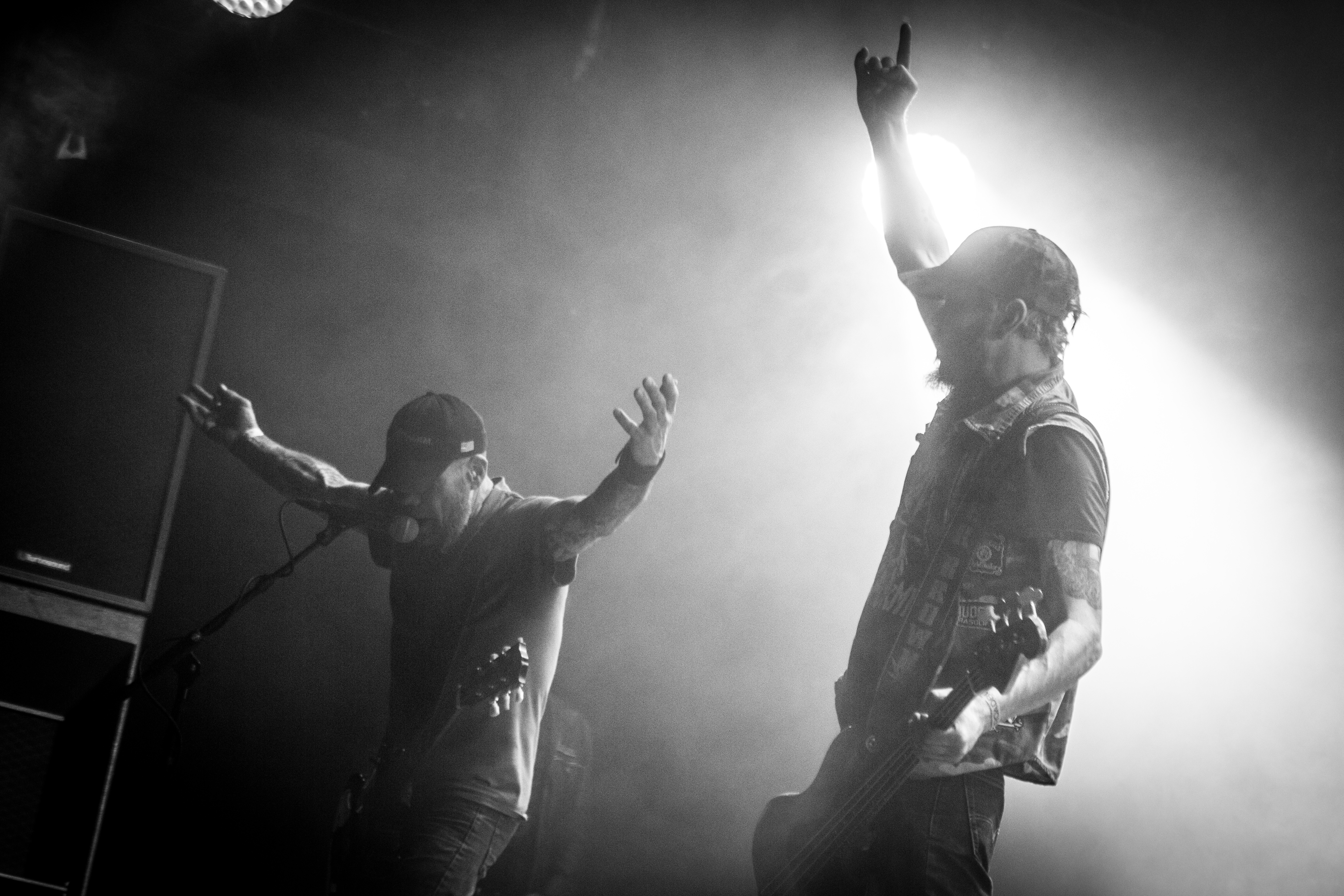
- Bongzilla at Roadburn Festival 2017

Background information
- Origin: Madison, Wisconsin, U.S.
- Genres: Stoner metal, sludge metal
- Years active: 1995–2009, 2015–present
- Labels: Relapse, Ritual, Barbarian
- Members: Mike "Muleboy" Makela; Jeff "Spanky" Schultz; Dirty Mike "Magma" Henry
- Past members: Dave "Dixie" Collins; Cooter "Black Bong" Brown; Nate "Weed Dragon" Dethlefsen; Nate Bush

Bongzilla is an American stoner metal band that formed in Madison, Wisconsin in 1995. They released their debut extended play, Mixed Bag, the following year through Rhetoric Records. Much of Bongzilla's lyrics are centered around cannabis use and similar themes. Following a six-year hiatus, the band reformed in 2015 and embarked upon a North American tour. The band's most recent album, Dab City, was released in 2023 through the label Heavy Psych Sounds.

== Members ==
Current

- Mike "Muleboy" Makela – vocals (1995–2009, 2015–present), bass (2020–present), guitar (1995–2009, 2015–2020)
- Jeff "Spanky" Schultz – guitar (1995–2009, 2015–present)
- Mike "Magma" Henry – drums (1995–2009, 2015–present)

Former

- Nate Bush – bass (1995)
- Nate "Weed Dragon" Dethlefsen (a.k.a. Meanstreak) – bass (1995–2001)
- Cooter "Black Bong" Brown – bass (2001–2005, 2015–2020)
- Dave "Dixie" Collins (of Weedeater) – bass (2005–2006)

Timeline

== Discography ==
Studio albums

Year	Title	Label
1999	Stash	Relapse Records
2000	Apogee	Relapse Records
2002	Gateway	Relapse Records
2005	Amerijuanican	Relapse Records
2021	Weedsconsin	Heavy Psych Sounds
2023	Dab City	Heavy Psych Sounds

EPs and splits

Year	Title	Label	Notes
1996	Mixed Bag	Rhetoric Records	
1997	"Budgun/THC"	Pinecone Records	Released as a split with Meatjack
1998	"Brownie/Gungeon"	Rhetoric Records	Released as a split with Cavity
1998	"Witch Weed"	HG Fact Records	Released as a split with Hellchild
1998	"Hemp for Victory"	Thunder Lizard Records	
1998	Methods for Attaining Extreme Altitudes	Relapse Records	Re-released in 2007 by Modus Operandi
2021	"Nectar Collector"	Gungeon Records	

Compilation albums

Year	Title	Label
2001	Shake: The Singles	Barbarian Records
2007	Nuggets	Barbarian Records
2007	Stash/Methods for Attaining Extreme Altitudes	Relapse Records
2018	Thank You, Marijuana	Gungeon Records

Live albums

Year	Title	Label
2004	Live from the Relapse Contamination Festival	Relapse Records
