= Voices of Omens =

Studio album by Rwake
- Released: February 20, 2007
- Studios: October 2006-Vocals, Guitars, Synths/Samples, Bass recorded at Volume Studios (Chicago); Drums recorded at Electrical Audio.
- Genre: Sludge metal
- Length: 59:06
- Label: Relapse Records
- Producer: Sanford Parker

Rwake chronology
If You Walk Before You Crawl, You Crawl Before You Die (2004)	Voices of Omens (2007)

Professional ratings
Review scores
Source	Rating
Pitchfork Media	8.0/10
Revolver	4/5 stars

Voices of Omens is the fourth full-length album release by Rwake. It is their first album released through Relapse Records. It has a total playing time of 59 minutes and 6 seconds.

== Musical style ==
The vocals are of a varied Death Metal style, varying from high shrieks to low growls and roars. The music is monolithic, but is more fast-paced and up-tempo than Doom Metal. The bass intertwines with the guitar, but is neither inaudible or emphasized.

== Track listing ==
No.	Title	Length
1.	"Intro"	1:23
2.	"The Finality"	9:09
3.	"Crooked Rivers"	7:10
4.	"Fire and Flight"	7:06
5.	"Leviticus"	7:17
6.	"Of Grievous Abominations"	9:40
7.	"Bridge"	1:21
8.	"Inverted Overtures"	6:45
9.	"The Lure of Light"	9:15

== Personnel ==
- Gravy (Guitar)
- Jeff - (Drums)
- C.T. - (Vocals)
- Reid - (Bass)
- B. - (Moog/Samples/Vocals)
- Kiffin - (Guitar)

== Critical reception ==
Pitchfork described it as "ingenious, forward-thinking metal." AllMusic called it "one of 2004's best and most intriguing heavy metal records".
