= The Illusion of Motion =

Studio album by Yob
- Released: October 19, 2004
- Recorded: April 2004
- Venue: Eugene, Oregon
- Studio: Dogwood Studios
- Genre: Doom metal, stoner metal
- Length: 56:28
- Label: Metal Blade

Yob chronology
Catharsis (2003)	The Illusion of Motion (2004)	The Unreal Never Lived (2005)

Professional ratings
Review scores
Source	Rating
AllMusic	3.5/5 stars
BW&BK	7.5/10 stars
Rock Hard	8.5/10 stars
Metal.de	9/10 stars

The Illusion of Motion is the third full-length album by the band YOB.

== Critical reception ==
Exclaim! wrote that YOB "have outdone themselves on The Illusion of Motion, and despite the album title, [they] will finally gain loads of well-deserved momentum to make them the most talked-about doom band since Sleep." CMJ New Music Report praised the album's "sprawling heaviness."

== Track listing ==
No.	Title	Length
1.	"Ball of Molten Lead"	11:09
2.	"Exorcism of the Host"	12:58
3.	"Doom #2"	6:11
4.	"The Illusion of Motion"	26:10
Total length:		56:28

== Personnel ==
Music

- Mike Scheidt - vocal, guitars
- Isamu Sato - bass
- Travis Foster - drums

Production

- Billy Barnett - mastering, mixing
- Mike Schiedt - mixing, mastering
- Jeff Olsen - audio engineer
- Isamu Sato - artwork, graphic design
- Jim Thompson - photography
