= The Great Cessation =

Studio album by YOB
- Released: July 14, 2009
- Recorded: March–April 2009
- Genre: Doom metal, stoner metal
- Length: 61:53
- Label: Profound Lore

YOB chronology
The Unreal Never Lived (2005)	The Great Cessation (2009)	Atma (2011)

Professional ratings
Review scores
Source	Rating
Pitchfork Media	(7.0/10)
AllMusic	3.5/5 stars

The Great Cessation is the fifth full-length album by American band YOB. It was released in July 2009 under Profound Lore and it the first release after reuniting.

The album was reissued on December 8, 2017, with remastered audio by Heba Kadry and new artwork, as well as two extra tracks.

== Track listing ==
No.	Title	Length
1.	"Burning the Altar"	12:37
2.	"The Lie That Is Sin"	11:19
3.	"Silence of Heaven"	9:48
4.	"Breathing from the Shallows"	7:35
5.	"The Great Cessation"	20:34
Total length:		61:53

2017 reissue bonus tracks
No.	Title	Length
6.	"Blessed by Nothing"	8:33
7.	"Pain Like Sugar"	5:48
Total length:		76:13

== Personnel ==
Music

- Mike Scheidt - vocal, guitars
- Aaron Rieseberg - bass
- Travis Foster - drums
- Sanford Parker - synthesizer

Production

- Billy Barnett - mastering
- Sanford Parker - engineer, mixing, producer
- Mike Schiedt - producer

Design

- Aaron Edge - construction, design, logo
