= Emo's =

Nightclub in Austin, Texas

- Interactive map of Emo's
- Former names: The Back Room; Emo's East
- Address: 2015 E Riverside Dr; Austin, TX 78741-1338
- Location: East Riverside-Oltorf
- Coordinates: 30°15′9″N 97°44′33″W
- Owner: C3 Presents
- Capacity: 1,700
- Type: Nightclub

Construction
- Opened: 1992

Website
- www.emosaustin.com

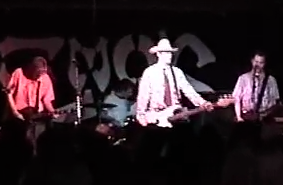
The Get Up Kids performing at Emo's in 1997.

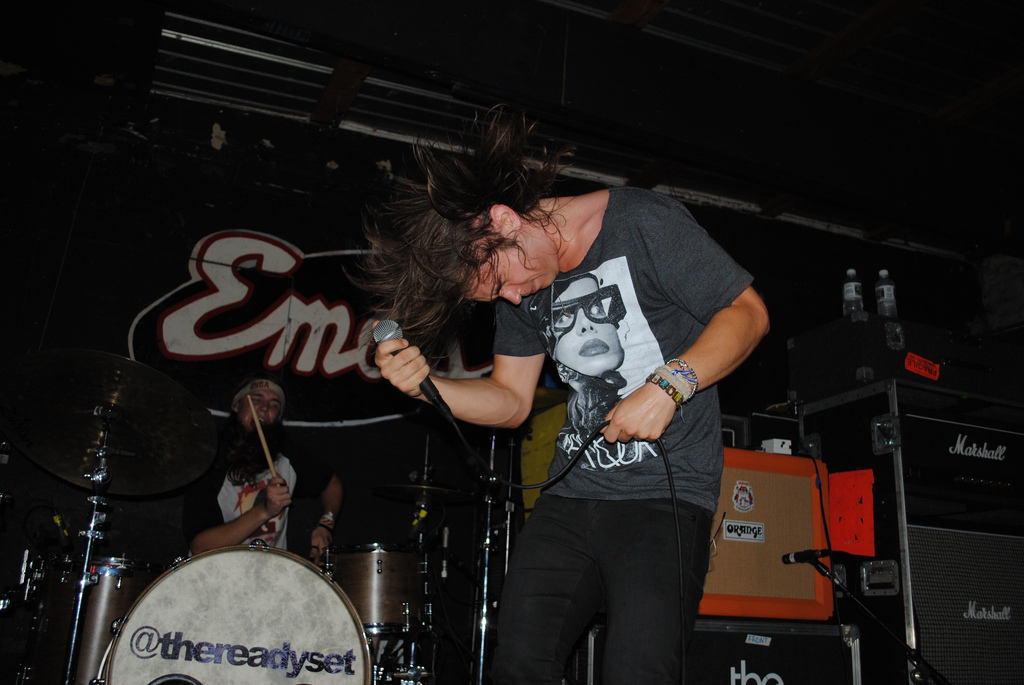
The Ready Set performing at Emo's in July 2010.

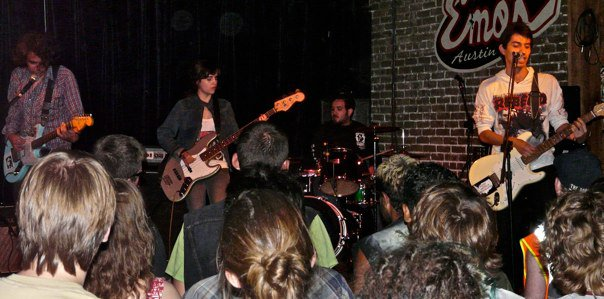
The Ratas Del Vaticano performing at Emo's in 2011.

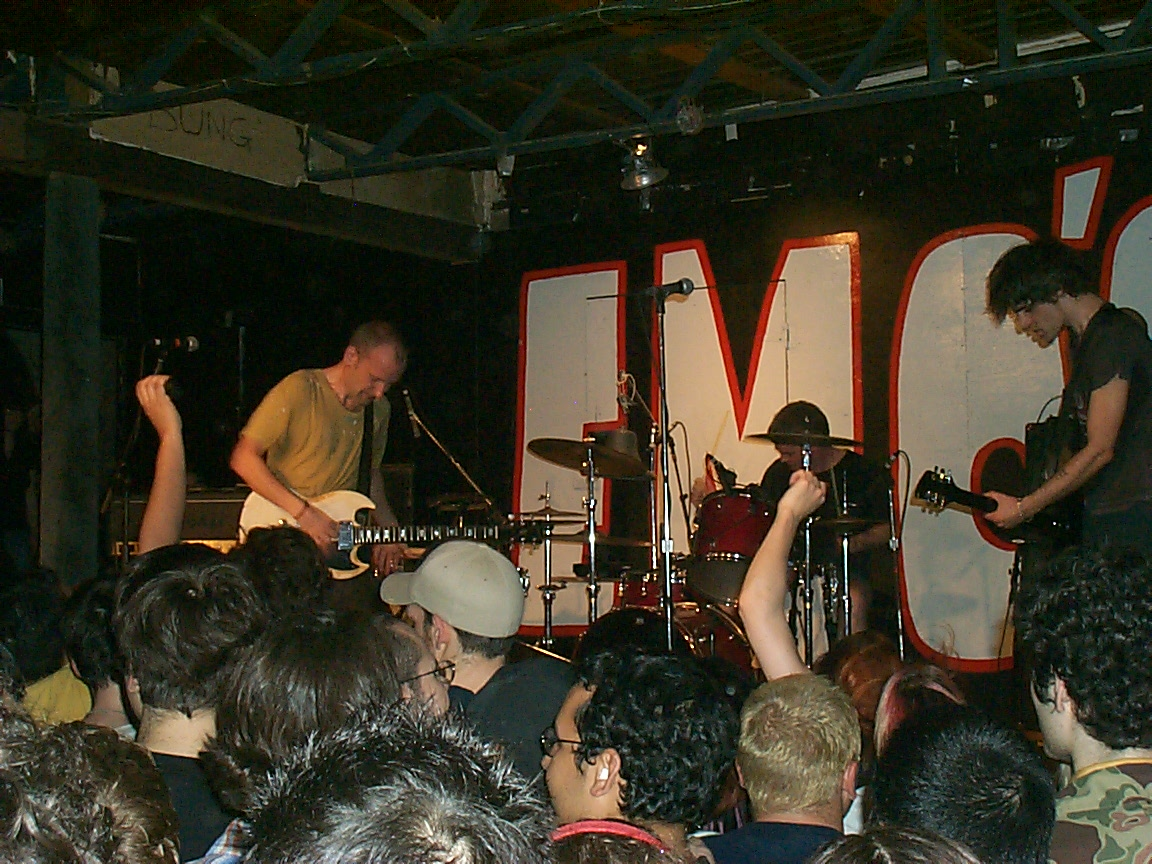
Fugazi performing at Emo's in March 2002

Emo's is a music and event venue located in Austin, Texas. Emo's got its start as a Houston punk club in 1989, with the Austin location opening in 1992. The Houston location closed its doors in September 2001.

The nightclub is an official South by Southwest Music Festival venue, during which it consists of four stages. The annual Emissions from the Monolith festival relocated to Emo's in 2007. The club closed in December 2011 for undisclosed reasons. In September 2011, a new venue opened on East Riverside, on the site of the old Back Room venue.

On February 11, 2013, Emo's announced they were being sold to C3 Presents, the booking agent/production company behind Austin City Limits Festival and Lollapalooza, among other endeavors.

In June 2026, the venue had announced their closure, after a Los Angeles company announced they would be taking over operations in 2027.

== Notable performers ==
- AJR (2018-02-17)
- New Bohemians (1988-12-17)
- Devo (1988-12-02)
- Johnny Cash (1994-03-14)

== See also ==
- Music of Austin, Texas
