= Catharsis (Yob album) =

Studio album by YOB
- Released: October 14, 2003
- Recorded: February 2003
- Genre: Doom metal, stoner metal
- Length: 49:04
- Label: Abstract Sounds

YOB chronology
Elaborations of Carbon (2002)	Catharsis (2003)	The Illusion of Motion (2004)

Catharsis is the second studio album by the heavy metal band YOB. It was released in 2003 on Abstract Sounds, and was reissued in 2014 by Relapse Records via vinyl.

== Critical reception ==
Professional ratings
Review scores
Source	Rating
AllMusic	3/5 stars
Punknews	4/5 stars
Sea of Tranquility	3/5 stars

Reception to Catharsis was fairly positive. Alex Henderson for AllMusic called the album "enjoyably solid, especially if one has a taste for dark, ominous doom metal." Jim for Punknews.org was another who spoke highly of the album, who in particular praised the guitarwork stating that it "ranges from heavy-as-fuck doom metal to spacey, psychedelic sounding riffs." Chris Ayers for Exclaim! stated that "Yob add a much needed variety to a tired genre, and Catharsis is hopefully just the beginning."

== Track listing ==
No.	Title	Length
1.	"Aeons"	18:10
2.	"Ether"	7:16
3.	"Catharsis"	23:38
Total length:		49:04

== Personnel ==
Music

- Mike Scheidt - vocals, guitars
- Isamu Sato - bass
- Gabe Morley - drums

Production

- Mike Schiedt - mixing
- Laura Jones - photography
- Ed Archer - unknown contribution
