= Mutha's Day Out =

American rock and heavy metal band

- Mutha's Day Out

Background information
- Origin: Batesville, Arkansas
- Genres: Alternative metal; funk metal; rap metal; hardcore punk; garage rock; thrashcore; alternative rock
- Years active: 1991–1994
- Label: Chrysalis
- Past members: Mikal Moore; Brice Stephens; Randy Cross; Chuck Schaaf; Lance Branstetter; Jeff Morgan; Rodney Moffitt; Matt Baker; BJ Rogers

Mutha's Day Out was an American rock & heavy metal band formed in November 1991 from the town of Batesville, Arkansas. The band consisted of: Mikal Moore (vocals), Brice Stephens (vocals), Chuck Schaaf (guitar), Jeff Morgan (bass), and Rodney Moffitt (drums). They released one album, My Soul is Wet, in 1993 for Chrysalis Records before breaking up.

== Biography ==
=== Early days (1991–1992) ===
Mikal Moore (born Michael Morehead) and his cousin Randy Cross conceived Mutha's Day Out one night in November 1991 while listening to Luke Skyywalker as a way to “get chicks.” The name was thought up by Brice Stephens (initially a mutual friend) and came from a daycare center in Batesville that kids could go to for pre-school in Methodist churches. Jeff Morgan had just been kicked out of a band he and Chuck Schaaf were in when Mikal asked him to be in a band that would sound like "Faith No More, Beastie Boys, and Ozzy Osbourne." The band was rounded out by Matt Baker, who played drums, and Lance Branstetter, who played guitar, with Chuck serving as his guitar tech. When the band first came together, Lance was 21 years old, Mikal was 20, Brice was 18, Chuck was 17, and Jeff was 15.

In late January 1992, the band traveled to Memphis, Tennessee, in search of an inexpensive recording studio, and found Easley McCain Recording owned and run by recording engineers Doug Easley and Davis McCain. After producing Mutha's Day Out's first demo tape on January 28, which consisted of 3 tracks ("Dry Water", "Love is a Hate Situation", and "What U See/We All Bleed Red"), Doug booked the band to play in the Crossroads Music Festival that week. In the same performance, Mutha's Day Out's first, a representative from Chrysalis Records, Karen DuMont (who, to this day, still works with Mikal), was present to see and sign another band. After seeing MDO's performance, she offered them a chance to go to the studio the next day, while receiving a record contract as well. Soon after the band signed a songwriting agreement with leading independent music publisher, Hit & Run Music Publishing, being championed by Joey Gmerek and Dave Massey in the New York and London offices.

=== My Soul is Wet (1993) ===
The day after Mutha's Day Out received their record contract, Randy Cross left the band due to their sudden rise in the music industry as well as the increased responsibilities he would now be faced with. Matt soon followed as well and the band was later forced by Chrysalis to fire Lance. However, they had already recorded 15 tracks with Lance for Chrysalis, which is the reason he receives a writing credit on many of the finished album's tracks. The band replaced Lance with Chuck and Matt briefly with BJ Rogers before going forward with Rodney Moffitt, who was also 17 years old.

Halfway through the production of the album, Greenforth Pham, a Vietnamese boy who was a close friend of Mikal and Brice's, committed suicide. Afterwards, Mikal decided to dedicate the album in his memory. They also commissioned a tribute song entitled "Green". In January 2024, it was voted “Best Song” on the Mutha’s Day Out Facebook page.

The album was later finished and released on cassette, CD, and, in certain markets, limited-edition/numbered vinyl on October 19, 1993. Chrysalis released four singles from the album: "Locked", "My Soul is Wet", "Green" and "We All Bleed Red". The first three singles were accompanied by music videos, with "Locked" being used on a segment of Beavis and Butt-Head in the episode "Crisis Line". In addition, on March 5, 1994, Mikal and Brice appeared on an episode of Headbangers Ball with Riki Rachtman to promote the album and the "Locked" music video was shown.

=== Tour (1993–1994) ===
Mutha's Day Out toured the United States and Europe from Fall 1993 to September 1994. They opened for such acts as I Mother Earth, Sir Mix-a-Lot, Prong, Jackyl, Rollins Band, Terrorvision, Sugartooth, and BulletBoys. Jeff, at one point during the tour, was in a leg brace having dislocated his knee the night before at a club gig in Birmingham, Alabama, but was still insistent on playing. During their tour in the United States, they stayed in cheap hotels to lower the cost of the record company's tour bill.

Notable shows from the American leg of their tour include their performance on October 9, 1993, in front of 600 fans in their hometown of Batesville, which was recorded and used in the music videos for “Locked” and “Green”. Their show in Boise, Idaho, at Bogie’s is also notable for being the only video available for viewing on YouTube that shows a full live performance. Their final live performance occurred on September 17, 1994, in Nyack, New York, at an unknown venue.

In the European leg of their tour, however, the band gained great notoriety, especially in France. There are many diehard fans to this day that are concentrated around Paris. Their only live record (EP) was recorded on May 12, 1994, at the L’Arapaho inside the (now-defunct) Virgin Megastore in Paris to a strong audience of loyal fans and contains 5 tracks. The band also performed at major rock festivals such as Winterthur in Switzerland and the Roskilde Festival in Denmark.

=== Breakup (1994) ===
After the final show of their tour, Mikal left the band, but this had been discussed and dealt with already with Chrysalis before the album even came out. He was obligated to do the tour, however, and couldn't leave until that part of the deal was fulfilled. After Mikal left, the band decided to call it quits rather than continue forward with a new singer. The main reason the band broke up is that they were all going in different directions musically and it ripped apart the band. Had the band stayed together, Chuck and Jeff would have done most of the writing and gone in a much darker direction (with a sound similar to Kreator). In the aftermath, Mikal obtained the rights to Mutha's Day Out and still owns the rights to this day.

=== Mortal Kombat (1995) ===
Mutha's Day Out appeared in the 1995 movie Mortal Kombat. The band received a call while on tour and were asked to take a few days to go to an old bomb shelter in Hollywood and film their scene. According to legend, Christopher Lambert, who is French, liked the band and recommended them. They appear in one of the opening scenes where Sonya is searching for Kano at a nightclub in Hong Kong amongst a large crowd moshing to them.

Their song, "What U See", is featured on the movie's soundtrack (listed as "What U See/We All Bleed Red") and is looped three times to form a four-minute song. It also features a short cowbell intro and the removal of the foul language the song originally contained, although some copies of the soundtrack still have the profanity. The movie grossed over 100 million dollars and the soundtrack was certified platinum within 6 months of its release. Due to having 50% songwriting credits alongside Mikal, Lance received a RIAA platinum certification plaque; Mikal never received his.

=== Today ===
Mikal is married with three daughters and is the lead vocalist for the Christian rock band Circa 71. Brice owned a restaurant and coffee shop in Batesville called “The Pinto Coffee and Comida” with his wife; he has two daughters. Jeff lives in Little Rock and plays for two bands: bass guitar for Deadbird and drums for Rwake; he is married with a son and daughter. Chuck played in Rwake until 2002 and was one of two founding members of Deadbird along with his brother, Phillip; Chuck is married with two kids and works in accounting. Rod lives in Batesville and worked for the city mowing yards, and now works for a contractor hanging dry wall and is married. Lance died in June 2021 at the age of 51 but previously was a chicken farmer and owned a recording studio. Randy is currently a loan officer at a bank in Batesville and teaching banking and accounting classes at a local college.

=== Reunion ===
In January 2012, Mikal announced via his Facebook account that a Mutha's Day Out reunion was in the works, with Chuck and Jeff returning to the band, as well as adding a new drummer and removing the back-up singer. However, further details never emerged.

In November 2019, it was announced that a special Mutha's Day Out encore featuring Mikal, Brice, Chuck and Jeff would be taking place following Deadbird's performance at the Mutants of the Monster Festival in Little Rock, Arkansas in June 2020. This marks the first time all four have been on stage together in over 25 years. Due to the COVID-19 pandemic, the reunion event is postponed indefinitely.

== Members ==
=== Former ===
- Mikal Moore - lead vocals (1991-1994)
- Brice Stephens - vocals (1991-1994)
- Randy Cross - vocals (1991-1992)
- Chuck Schaaf - guitar (1992-1994)
- Lance Branstetter - guitar (1991-1992; died in 2021)
- Jeff Morgan - bass (1991-1994)
- Rodney Moffitt - drums (1992-1994)
- Matt Baker - drums (1991-1992)
- BJ Rogers - drums (1992)

== Discography ==
=== My Soul is Wet (1993) ===
- Produced by Eli Ball at The Warehouse Studio in Memphis, Tennessee
- Released October 19, 1993

==== CD ====
| No. | Title | Writer(s) | Length |
|---|---|---|---|
| 1. | "Locked" | Mikal Moore; Rodney Moffitt | 3:54 |
| 2. | "My Soul is Wet" | Moore; Moffitt; Chuck Schaaf; Jeff Morgan; Brice Stephens | 2:48 |
| 3. | "Green" | Moore; Schaaf | 4:46 |
| 4. | "What U See/We All Bleed Red" | Moore; Lance Branstetter | 5:54 |
| 5. | "Dry Water" | Moore; Branstetter | 3:41 |
| 6. | "Ding Ding Man" | Stephens | 0:43 |
| 7. | "Get A Clue" | Moore; Moffitt; Morgan | 2:45 |
| 8. | "Blank Page" | Moore; Stephens; Morgan; Branstetter | 4:21 |
| 9. | "Memories Fade" | Moore; Schaaf; Morgan | 6:46 |
| 10. | "Breakfast First Please" | Moore; Branstetter | 2:55 |
| 11. | "Wait for Me" | Moore; Schaaf | 3:56 |
| 12. | "Ugly" | Moore; Morgan | 3:40 |
| Total length: | | | 46:09 |
