= Age Eternal =

Studio album by Middian
- Released: March 20, 2007
- Recorded: November 2006
- Genres: Doom metal, sludge metal
- Length: 57:08
- Label: Metal Blade Records

Professional ratings
Review scores
Source	Rating
About.com	3.5/5 stars
AllMusic	3.5/5 stars

Age Eternal is the debut and sole album of American doom metal band Middian, released on March 20, 2007.

== Track listing ==
- All songs written by Mike Scheidt.
1. "Dreamless Eye" – 9:35
2. "The Blood of Icons" – 11:30
3. "Age Eternal" – 14:04
4. "The Celebrant" – 6:11
5. "Sink to the Center" – 15:48

== Personnel ==
Middian

- Mike Scheidt – guitar, vocals
- Will Lindsay – bass guitar, vocals
- Scott Headrick – drums, percussion

Additional personnel

- Ben Ward (from Orange Goblin) – indecipherable rant on "Sink to the Center".

Production

- Arranged & Produced By Middian
- Engineered By Jeff Olsen
- Mixed By Middian & Josh Alderson
- Mastered By John Golden
