= James Romig =

American composer

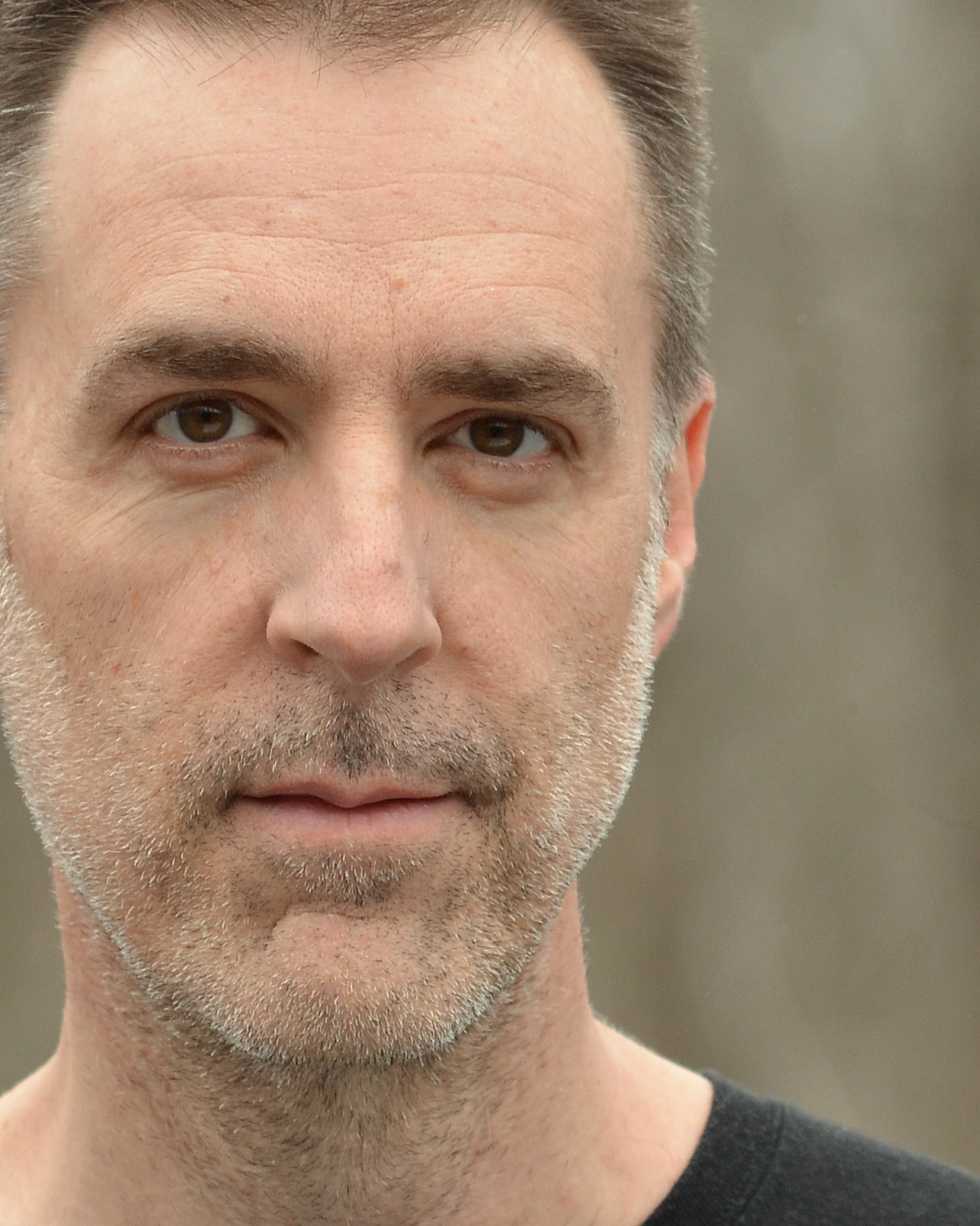
- Born: August 5, 1971
- Education: Rutgers University (PhD); University of Iowa (MM, BM)
- Website: www.jamesromig.com

James Romig (born August 5, 1971) is an American composer. He was a finalist for the 2019 Pulitzer Prize in Music.

== Biography ==
James Romig was born August 5, 1971, in Long Beach, California. He earned BM and MA degrees in from the University of Iowa in percussion performance, and a PhD in composition from Rutgers University, where he studied with Charles Wuorinen. He studied additionally with Milton Babbitt, and both Babbitt and Wuorinen served on his dissertation committee. In 2001, after one-year visiting positions at Pittsburg State University and Bucknell University, Romig joined the faculty at Western Illinois University, where he heads the composition/theory area. He lives in Macomb, Illinois, with his wife Ashlee Mack (coordinator of piano instruction at Knox College).

== Career ==
- 2019 Pulitzer Prize in Music, finalist (Still, for solo piano)
- 2019 Copland House Award and Residency
- 2019 Petrified Forest National Park, Artist in Residence
- 2018 Guest Co-Editor of Perspectives of New Music issue celebrating Charles Wuorinen's 80th year
- 2017 Everglades National Park, Artist in Residence
- 2012 Grand Canyon National Park, Artist in Residence
- 2011 Copland House Award and Residency
- 2009 Petrified Forest National Park, Artist in Residence

== Discography ==
- The Complexity of Distance. Mike Scheidt, electric guitar. New World Records: NW 80837. 2022.
- Still. Ashlee Mack, piano. New World Records: NW 80802-2. 2018.
- Time Seems To Pass. New Muse Piano Duo. Blue Griffin Records: BGR 407. 2017.
- Leaves from Modern Trees: Chamber Music 1999–2016. Various artists. Parallax Music Press: PMP 172. 2017.
- Time Seems To Pass (extended version). Khasma Piano Duo. Parallax Music Press: PMP 171. 2017.
- Dorsia 2a. Duo Harpverk: “Offshoots.” Greenhouse Studios. 2014.
- Out of Frame. Millikin Percussion Ensemble: “Premieres.” First Step Records: FSR 5012. 2012.
- Ferocious Alphabets. Perspectives of New Music Vol. 49/2. PNM/OS CD3. 2012.
- Transparencies. SCI CD Series: “Mosaic.” Navona Records: NV 5825. 2010.

== Articles, Interviews, and References ==
- James Romig Official website that contains biographical information, a works list, score samples, recordings, and writings (including his PhD dissertation, liner notes for a Charles Wuorinen cd, and an interview with Milton Babbitt)
- Veil of Sound Interview. May 2022.
- Ashlee Mack Preview/Review of STILL. The New Yorker. December 2019.
- Pulitzer Prize Finalist. April 2019.
- Review of STILL. San Francisco Chronicle. April 2018.
- 3x5 Interview with James Romig. James Romig interviewed by George Hufnagl. January 2010.
- James Romig at Western Illinois University
- 'Ep. 51 with James Romig, composer' Interview by Tigran Arakelyan
