= Gateway (Bongzilla album) =

Studio album by Bongzilla
- Released: September 3, 2002
- Studio: Coney Island Studios
- Genre: Stoner metal; sludge metal
- Length: 47:06
- Label: Relapse
- Producer: Wendy Schneider

Bongzilla chronology
| Apogee (2000) | Gateway (2002) | Amerijuanican (2005) |

Professional ratings
Review scores
| Source | Rating |
|---|---|
| AllMusic | 4/5 stars |
| The Austin Chronicle | 2.5/5 stars |
| Rock Hard | 4/10 stars |

Gateway is the third full-length album by stoner metal band Bongzilla. It was released in September 2002 by Relapse Records. The title of the album is a reference to the term "gateway drug", used to describe an apparently more-benign drug that can lead to the use of more dangerous drugs.

== Track listing ==
| No. | Title | Length |
|---|---|---|
| 1. | "Greenthumb" | 4:07 |
| 2. | "Stone a Pig" | 9:47 |
| 3. | "Sunnshine Green" | 4:20 |
| 4. | "666lb. Bongsession" (switched on the back cover) | 7:55 |
| 5. | "Trinity [Gigglebush]" (switched on the back cover) | 4:40 |
| 6. | "Gateway" | 7:18 |
| 7. | "Keefmaster" | 4:27 |
| 8. | "Hashdealer" | 4:32 |
| Total length: | | 47:06 |

== Personnel ==
- Muleboy - guitar, vocals
- Spanky - guitar
- Cooter Brown - bass
- Magma - drums
