= Dixie Witch =

Stoner rock music group from Texas, US

- Origin: Texas, US
- Genres: Stoner rock
- Years active: 1999 - present
- Members: Trinidad Leal; Curt Christensen; J.T. Smith
- Past members: Clayton Mills

Dixie Witch is a Texas-based stoner rock trio formed by guitarist Clayton Mills, drummer/vocalist Trinidad Leal, and bassist/vocalist Curt Christensen in 1999. The band released their self-produced album Into the Sun on Brainticket Records in 2001. That summer, the band embarked on the "Southern Domination" US Tour with Alabama Thunderpussy and Suplecs. Following that tour, the band signed with Detroit-based Small Stone Records in 2003. One Bird, Two Stones, produced by Jeff Pinkus, was released that spring and Smoke and Mirrors, produced by Joel Hamilton, was released in 2006.

The band was a regular act at the Emissions from the Monolith festival, performed at the Roadburn Festival in 2008 and appeared at the South by Southwest Music Conference every year since 2001.

Dixie Witch's songs have appeared on soundtracks to the video games NHL 2005 and Major League Baseball 2K7 as well as TV shows Viva La Bam and The Mentalist, among others.

In 2009, Clayton Mills left the band and was replaced by J.T. Smith. The band currently resides in Austin, Texas.
