= Minsk (band) =

American extreme metal band

- Origin: Peoria, Illinois, U.S.
- Genres: Sludge metal, post-metal, doom metal
- Years active: 2002–present
- Labels: At a Loss, Relapse
- Members: Christopher Bennett; Timothy Mead; Aaron Austin; Zac Livingston; Ryan Thomas; Sanford Parker
- Past members: Anthony Couri; Drew McDowell; Brian Barth; Jared Madigan; Dustin Addis; Jeff Hyde; Kevin Rendleman
- Website: www.thesoundofminsk.com

Minsk is an extreme metal band from Peoria, Illinois founded in 2002. Self-described as "psychedelic metal", their songs tend to start out as slow and simple, and become heavy and complex towards the end. Their sound draws from doom metal, hardcore punk, ambient and noise music, with a highly psychedelic attitude achieved through tribal drum patterns, thick layers of synthesizers and keyboards, and echoing vocals. They are named after the capital of Belarus. The idea of survival through suffering is a recurring theme in the lyrics and musical style. In fact, regarding the origin of their name, their official biography states: "Drawing its nominal inspiration from a remote Belarusian city nestled deep amidst the in-betweens of the East and the West, a city that has been burned to the ground on several occasions only to be rebuilt like a Phoenix rising from its ashes." The sounds and atmospheres they evoke in their songs are complex and psychedelic.

== History ==
Minsk was formed in 2002 between the cities of Peoria and Chicago. They soon produced a demo CD entitled Burning, released by Lisa Falzone Recordings around the time of a United States tour and appearance at the Templars of Doom Festival in 2004. In late 2004, Minsk was featured on the compilation If It Plays…, which consisted solely of artists in the Peoria region (hence the title).

The band's first full-length album, Out of a Center Which Is Neither Dead nor Alive, was recorded in late 2004 and released in 2005 on At a Loss Recordings, following appearances at the South by Southwest and Emissions from the Monolith festivals. During the recording of the album, Drew McDowell left the band leaving them without a bassist. Sanford Parker, a big fan of Minsk and the guitarist for doom metal band Buried at Sea, who was producing the album at the time, decided to join Minsk as a full-time bassist to replace McDowell and also resumed his production work. Soon after Parker joined, founding member and guitarist Dustin Addis left, leaving the band to record Out of a Center Which Is Neither Dead nor Alive as a four piece, with Cristopher Bennett solely in charge of guitar duties. To support the album's release, the band embarked on a nationwide tour supporting many popular metal artists, notably Brutal Truth, High on Fire, Boris, Sunn O))), and Pig Destroyer.

Following the tour, Minsk prepared to record their second album, The Ritual Fires of Abandonment, which was released February 2007 through Relapse Records who signed them immediately because of their growth in popularity and positive reception of their debut. After its release, Minsk went on another United States tour in support, reappearing at the South by Southwest and Emissions from the Monolith festivals in addition to several east coast stops. The band released their 3rd LP, With Echoes in the Movement of Stone, on Relapse Records in 2009.

After 6 years of silence, Minsk finished recording their upcoming fourth album, The Crash and the Draw which was released via Relapse Records in North America on April 7, 2015, April 3, 2015, in Germany, Benelux and Finland and April 6, 2015, in the UK and rest of the world. This album was captured by the band alongside Sanford Parker at Earth Analog in Tolono, mixed by Parker and Minsk at Hypercube in Chicago, and mastered by Collin Jordan at The Boiler Room in Chicago with additional vocal tracking by Scott Evans at Antisleep Audio in Oakland, California and further tracking, editing, and mixing by Kevin Rendleman at Trash Rocket Audio and Aaron Austin at We Know Who You Are, both in Peoria. The record includes cover artwork by Orion Landau.

== Members ==
=== Current members ===
- Christopher Bennett (2002–present)
- Timothy Mead (2002–present)
- Aaron Austin (2010–present)
- Zachary Livingston (2012–present)
- Ryan Thomas (2018–present)

=== Previous members ===
- Ryan Thomas - drums (2012–2014)
- Jeff Hyde – bass guitar
- Dustin Addis – guitar
- Anthony Couri (A.K.A. Tony Wyoming) – drums
- Drew McDowell – bass guitar
- Joel Madigan – bass guitar (live)
- Brian Barth – drums (live and on Burning demo)
- Jared Madigan – bass (live and on "Burning" demo)
- Kevin Rendleman – drums (2014–2018)
- Sanford Parker - bass, vocals (2005-2012)

== Discography ==
=== Studio albums ===
- Burning demo (Lisa Falzone Recordings)
- Out of a Center Which Is Neither Dead nor Alive (2005, At a Loss Recordings)
- The Ritual Fires of Abandonment (2007, Relapse Records)
- With Echoes in the Movement of Stone (2009, Relapse Records)
- The Crash and the Draw (2015, Relapse Records)

=== Splits ===
- Split with Unearthly Trance 7" (2009, Parasitic Records)
- Bigod, split with Zatokrev, (2018, Czar of Crickets / Consouling Sounds)

=== Compilation appearances ===
- If It Plays… (2004, Thinker Thought Records) (contributed "White Wings of Death Scatter Our Days")
- For the Sick tribute compilation (2007, Emetic Records) (contributed "Ruptured Heart Theory")
- Hawkwind Triad tribute to Hawkwind (2010, Neurot Recordings) (with U.S. Christmas and Harvestman)
