= Gretzky (surname) =

Gretzky (Belarusian: Грэцкі; Russian: Грецкий)is a Belarusian and Russian family name of Polish origin having Jewish roots. In Poland the surname is Grecki.

The name is best known in English speaking countries as the surname of Canada's most famous hockey player, Wayne Gretzky. His father Walter Gretzky reports that his own father, an immigrant to Canada, was of consciously Belarusian landowner stock.

The origin of the name is the Polish aristocratic surname Grecki, or specifically Grecki h. Prawdzic – Grecki of the Prawdzic coat of arms. The Russian form of the name, following the Polish, is an old variant spelling of the Russian adjective for "Greek", although in modern Russian this spelling of the adjective is mainly used for "Greek nut", meaning the walnut (also in Belarusian; Грэцкі арэх, Greek nut, walnut).

The Russian name is the name of two notable soldiers on the Eastern Front in World War II; Piotr Gretzky (ru:Грецкий, Пётр Петрович) (1904–1972) a Soviet army colonel, and Vladimir Gretzky (ru:Грецкий, Владимир Иванович) (1912–2000) a tank commander. Both were awarded Hero of the Soviet Union.

In Poland the name is not common, but found for example with the pianist Maksymilian Grecki (1841–1870) and the rock guitarist pl:Jacek Grecki (born 1977).

Notable people with the surname include:

- Wayne Gretzky (born 1961), Canadian professional ice hockey player
- Walter Gretzky (1938–2021), member of the Order of Canada, and father to Wayne
- Keith Gretzky (born 1967), professional ice hockey player and brother to Wayne
- Brent Gretzky (born 1972), professional ice hockey player and brother to Wayne
- Janet Jones-Gretzky (born 1961), American actress and wife to Wayne
- Lisa Gretzky (born 1971), Canadian politician and cousin-in-law to Wayne
