= Electro Quarterstaff =

- Origin: Winnipeg, Manitoba, Canada
- Genres: Instrumental music Progressive metal Technical metal Thrash metal
- Years active: 2001–present
- Label: Willowtip Records
- Members: Josh Bedry; Drew Johnston; Andrew Dickens; Dan Ryckman; Marty Thiessen

Electro Quarterstaff is an instrumental metal band hailing from Winnipeg, Manitoba, Canada. They play a form of progressive/technical heavy metal and employ three lead guitarists. Initially consisting of three guitarists, a vocalist and a drummer, they added a bassist to their line-up in winter 2006 and played their first show with him in autumn 2007. The band is named for a weapon in the Canadian cartoon Rocket Robin Hood.

The band self-released the Swayze EP in 2004. They later signed with Willowtip Records for their debut full-length album in 2006, Gretzky, which included rerecorded and reworked versions of their earlier tracks. Also in 2006 they toured the United States and Canada for the first time, which included a performance at the Maryland Deathfest.

== Members ==
- Josh Bedry – guitar
- Drew Johnston – guitar
- Andrew Dickens – guitar
- Dan Ryckman – drums
- Marty Thiessen – bass guitar

== Discography ==
- Swayze (EP - 2004)
- Gretzky (LP/CD - 2006)
- Aykroyd (LP/CD - 2011)

== See also ==
- Electro quarterstaff, weapon of Rocket Robin Hood and his merry men.
