= With Echoes in the Movement of Stone =

Studio album by Minsk
- Released: May 26, 2009
- Recorded: January – February 2009 at Volume Studios in Chicago
- Genre: Post-metal, doom metal
- Length: 63:03
- Label: Relapse
- Producer: Sanford Parker

Minsk chronology
The Ritual Fires of Abandonment (2007)	With Echoes in the Movement of Stone (2009)

With Echoes in the Movement of Stone is the third studio album by American doom metal band Minsk, released on May 26, 2009, through Relapse Records.

== Reception ==
Professional ratings
Review scores
Source	Rating
About.com	4/5 stars
Allmusic	4/5 stars
Rock Sound	8/10 stars

The album received moderately good reviews, receiving praise or the stylistic range of the music, with Allmusic's Phil Freeman noting that "The band's music surges and ebbs like a massive tide, with the guitar lines moving in a linear and horizontal", and being called "a dynamic, shape-shifting beast that takes the form of a swaying ghost-like figure one minute before swelling into some sort of stone-crushing giant the next" by Ryan Ogle of About.com. Both reviewers also noted similarities between the album and Neurosis's Through Silver in Blood. Both reviewers also agreed that the album was within the style that Minsk was known for, with Ogle claiming that "the end result is unmistakably Minsk", though they disagreed about how much experimentation occurred within that sound. Freeman stated that "while this album doesn't move Minsk's music forward in any significant way–they do what they do–it's a superb example of a band achieving total stylistic maturity", while Ogle stated that the band was "chart[ing] the previously unexplored territory that is With Echoes In The Movement Of Stone".

== Track listing ==
- All Songs Written & Arranged By Minsk.
1. "Three Moons" – 6:08
2. "The Shore of Transcendence" – 9:59
3. "Almitra's Premonition" – 10:06
4. "Means to an End" – 5:59
5. "Crescent Mirror" – 8:58
6. "Pisgah" – 4:07
7. "Consumed by Horizons of Fire" – 6:31
8. "Requiem: From Substance to Silence" – 11:18

== Personnel ==
- Christopher Bennett – guitar, vocals
- Timothy Mead – synthesizer
- Sanford Parker – bass guitar, vocals, keyboards
- Tony Wyioming – drums
- Produced, Engineered and Mixed by Sanford Parker
- Artwork and Layout by Orion Landau
