= Samothrace (band) =

American metal band

Samothrace was an American sludge and doom metal band. They released two studio album and one live album.

== Discography ==
- Life's Trade (2008)
- Reverence to Stone (2012)
- Live at Roadburn (live album, 2015)
