= Maksymilian Grecki =

Polish pianist

Maksymilian Grecki (Poznań, 1841 – Poznań, 1870) was a Polish pianist and composer who lived in the Kingdom of Prussia. He was the son of a church organist, who studied in Leipzig with Franz Brendel and Ignaz Moscheles. He died of tuberculosis at the age of 30. His small number of works consist mainly of songs.
