= Atma (album) =

Studio album by YOB
- Released: August 16, 2011
- Genre: Doom metal, stoner metal
- Length: 55:06
- Label: Profound Lore

YOB chronology
The Great Cessation (2009)	Atma (2011)	Clearing the Path to Ascend (2014)

Professional ratings
Review scores
Source	Rating
AllMusic	3/5 stars
Pitchfork	(8.3/10)

Atma is the sixth studio album by American band YOB. It was released in August 2011 under Profound Lore Records.

== Track listing ==
No.	Title	Length
1.	"Prepare the Ground"	9:05
2.	"Atma"	8:56
3.	"Before We Dreamed of Two"	15:59
4.	"Upon the Sight of the Other Shore"	7:33
5.	"Adrift in the Ocean"	13:33
Total length:		55:06

== Personnel ==
Adapted from AllMusic.

YOB

- Mike Scheidt – vocal, guitars, noise, samples
- Aaron Rieseberg – bass, noise, samples
- Travis Foster – drums, noise, samples

Additional musicians

- Scott Kelly – vocals, percussion
- Jeff Olsen – noise, samples
- Dustin Rieseberg – noise, samples

Production

- Billy Barnett – mastering
- Mike Schiedt – mixing, mastering
- Jeff Olsen – mixing, mastering

Design

- Stevie Floyd – artwork
- Aaron Edge – design, logo, layout
