= Warhorse (American band) =

American doom metal band

- Origin: Worcester, Massachusetts, United States
- Genres: Doom metal Stoner metal Sludge metal
- Years active: 1996–2005, 2019-present
- Label: Southern Lord
- Past members: Jerry Orne; Mike Hubbard; Krista Van Guilder; Matt Smith; Todd Laskowski (Date of Death - 05/19/2018); Terry Savastano

WarHorse is a doom metal band that formed in Worcester, Massachusetts, United States, in 1996, and released their debut album, As Heaven Turns to Ash on Southern Lord Records in 2001. They officially disbanded in 2005 after releasing the single "I Am Dying".

In 2019, after the passing of former guitarist Todd Laskowski, WarHorse reemerged for what was planned as a one-off tribute set at Maryland Doom Fest. The band was then offered a spot at Psycho Las Vegas, which led to a handful of additional shows before the pandemic shut down the live music world. Not to be discouraged, WarHorse returned in September 2021 to play the Decibel Magazine Metal & Beer Fest.

== Members ==
- Jerry Orne - bass, vocals (1996-current)
- Mike Hubbard - drums (1996-current)
- Terry Savastano - guitar (1998-current)
- Krista Van Guilder - vocals, guitar (1996–1998)
- Matt Smith - vocals, guitar (1998–1999)
- Todd Laskowski - guitar (1998; died 2018)

Released	Title	Label
1997	Warhorse (Demo)	Self-released
1998	Winter (Demo)	Self-released
1999	Lysergic Communion EP	Self-released
2000	The Priestess EP	Ellington Records
2001	As Heaven Turns to Ash	Southern Lord Records
2002	I Am Dying EP	Southern Lord Records
