= Gretzky (album) =

Studio album by Electro Quarterstaff
- Released: October 24, 2006
- Recorded: April 29 – May 3, 2006
- Genre: Progressive metal Thrash metal
- Length: 51:32
- Label: Willowtip Records
- Producer: Craig Boychuk

Electro Quarterstaff chronology
Swayze (2004)	Gretzky (2006)	Aykroyd (2011)

Gretzky is the debut full-length album by Canadian instrumental progressive metal band Electro Quarterstaff. It is named after hockey legend Wayne Gretzky and follows the trend of the band naming their releases as the last name of a male celebrity – a trend that had begun on their first EP, Swayze (named for Patrick Swayze); it continued with the release of their second LP, Aykroyd.

== Track listing ==
1. "Neckwrecker" – 6:56
2. "Twisted Squid" – 5:24
3. "Charmony" – 6:38
4. "The Right to Arm Bears" – 6:24
5. "Get Sick" – 7:10
6. "Titanium Overlords" – 5:24
7. "Eyepatch Romance" – 2:41
8. "Something's Awry in the Hetfield of Dreams" – 10:53

== Personnel ==
- Andrew Dickens – guitar
- Josh Bedry – guitar, OC-3 on "Charmony"
- Drew Johnston – guitar, OC-3 on all songs except "Charmony"
- Dan Ryckman – drums
