= Rwake =

American sludge metal band

- Origin: North Little Rock, Arkansas, United States
- Genres: Sludge metal
- Years active: 1996–present
- Label: Relapse Records
- Members: Brittany Fugate; John Judkins; Jeff Morgan; Chris Terry; Reid Raley; Austin Sublett
- Past members: Rob Eaton; Aaron Mills; Chuck Schaaf; Kris Graves; Chris Newman; Kiffin Rogers

Rwake is an American sludge metal band from North Little Rock, Arkansas, United States.

== History ==
Rwake began as a four-piece in 1996. The band was originally called Wake. The first Wake show was on March 15, 1997, in Batesville, Arkansas at the Landers Theater.

They began touring in October 2001, and self-released two recordings, Xenoglossalgia: The Last Stage of Awareness, and Absence Due to Projection. Since then, five more albums were released: Hell is a Door to the Sun; If You Walk Before You Crawl, You Crawl Before You Die; Voices of Omens; Rest; and The Return of Magik.

The band signed with Relapse Records in January 2006 and released Voices of Omens in February 2007. After their Relapse debut, Rwake maintained a busy touring schedule in support of Voices of Omens. Since then, the band has laid low playing a few road stints here and there and going overseas two different times to Hellfest in France, and back for Roadburn in the Netherlands and further dates in Europe and finally the UK. The band finished up work for their second album on Relapse titled Rest, which was released on September 27, 2011.

In 2025, the band returned with lineup changes, bringing new lead guitarist Austin Sublett and releasing two new singles, “The Return of Magik”, released on January 28, 2025, and “You Swore We'd Always Be Together”, released on February 26, 2025. These singles led up to their studio album The Return of Magik, which was released on March 14, 2025.

== Members ==
Current

- Jeff Morgan – drums, acoustic guitar (1996–present)
- Chris "CT" Terry – vocals (1996–present)
- Brittany "The B" Fugate – moog, vocals, samples (1999–present)
- Reid Raley – bass (1999–2011, 2015–present)
- John Judkins – guitar (2011–present)
- Austin Sublett – guitar (2023–present)

Former

- Aaron Mills – bass (1996–1999)
- Rob Eaton – keyboards, vocals (1997–1999)
- Chuck Schaaf – guitar (2002), tour drums (2008)
- Kiffin Rogers – guitar (2003–2018)
- Kris "Gravy" Graves – guitar (1996–2020)
- Chris Newman – guitar (1998–2001, 2013)

== Discography ==
=== Studio albums ===
- Absence Due to Projection (1999)
- Hell is a Door to the Sun (2002)
- If You Walk Before You Crawl, You Crawl Before You Die (2004)
- Voices of Omens (2007)
- Rest (2011) Relapse Records
- The Return of Magik (2025) Relapse Records

=== Demos, EP, Splits and Compilations ===
- Suicide: The Quest For Oblivion (1997)
- Frozen Dawn IV Compilation (1998)
- Xenoglossalgia: The Last Stage of Awareness (1998)
- South of Hell Compilation (2001)
- Destroys All:A Tribute to Godzilla Compilation (2003)
- split 7inch w/Sloth (song-hell is a door live) (2004)
- Forge 7inch (songs Forge and Imbedded live) (2012)

=== Live album ===
- Swallowed by the Void Forever: Live at Maryland Deathfest (2013)
