= Yob (band) =

American doom metal band

YOB
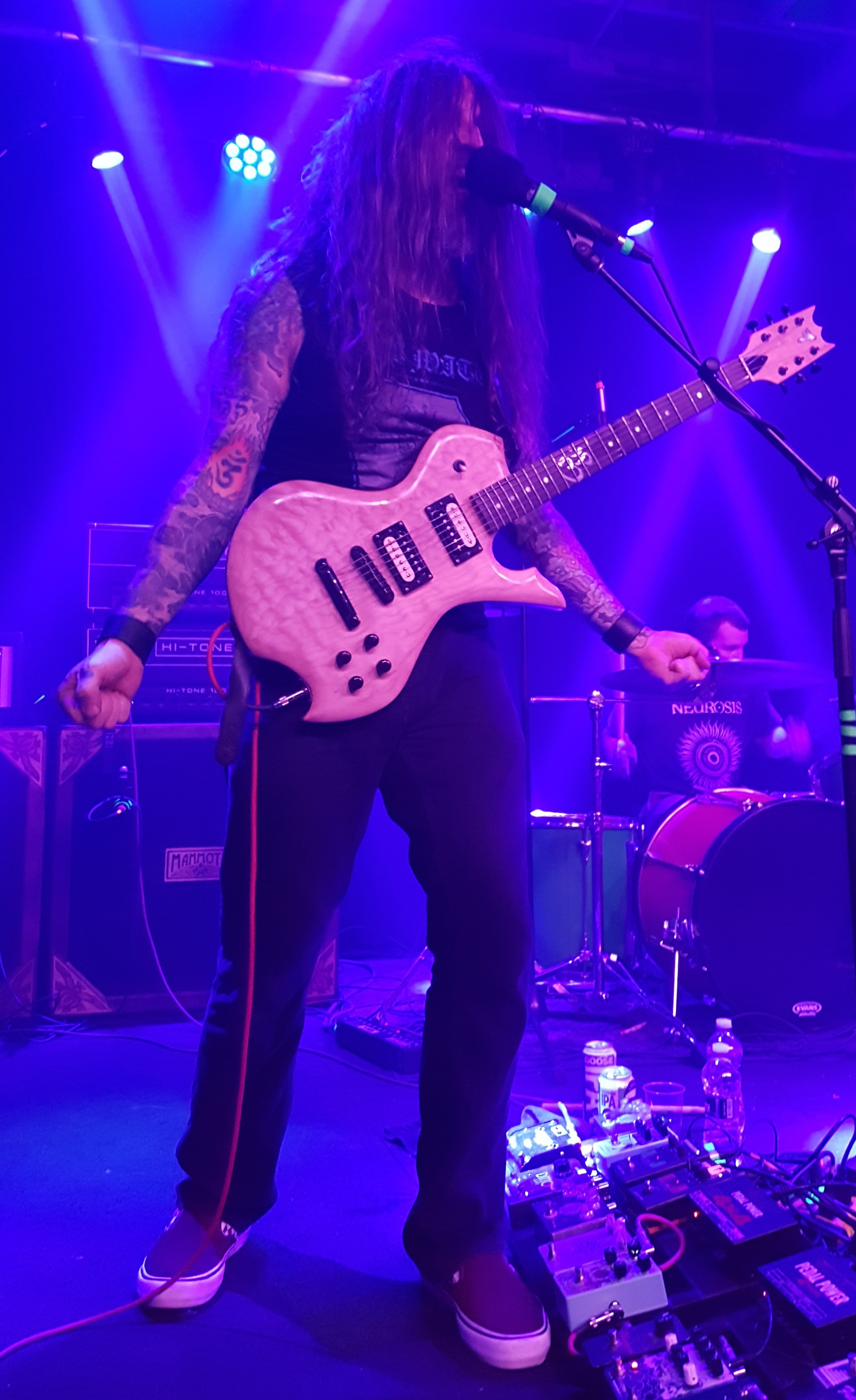
- Michael Scheidt Performing with YOB in 2018

Background information
- Origin: Eugene, Oregon, U.S.
- Genres: Doom metal; stoner metal; post-metal
- Years active: 1996–2006, 2008–present
- Labels: Abstract Sounds, Metal Blade, Neurot, Profound Lore, Relapse
- Members: Mike Scheidt; Aaron Rieseberg; Dave French
- Past members: Lowell Iles; Greg Ocon; Gabe Morley; Isamu Sato; Travis Foster
- Website: yobislove.com

Yob (stylized as YOB) is an American doom metal band from Eugene, Oregon, composed of singer/guitarist Michael Scheidt, bassist Aaron Rieseberg and drummer Dave French. Their most recent studio album Our Raw Heart was released in June 2018.

== History ==
=== Beginnings (1996–2006) ===
Before founding YOB, Scheidt had been a bass guitarist with the hardcore bands Chemikill, Dirty Sanchez, and H.C. Minds. Scheidt switched to guitar and vocals and founded YOB in 1996 with bassist Lowell Iles and drummer Greg Ocon. The band's self-titled demo was submitted to Stonerrock.com in 1999. In 2001, YOB recorded its first full-length record for 12th Records in Spokane, Washington, entitled Elaborations of Carbon. By this time, Isamu Sato (of the bands H.C. Minds and Thrombus) had joined on bass and drummer Gabe Morley (of the bands Fingertrap and Lightweight) had joined on drums.

In 2002, YOB secured a recording contract with Abstract Sounds. Their first album for this label, Catharsis, had stronger production and three songs lasting 50 minutes. After its release, drummer Morley was replaced by Travis Foster. YOB's third full-length release, The Illusion of Motion, was released on Metal Blade Records in 2004, and their fourth album The Unreal Never Lived was released by Metal Blade in 2005.

Scheidt announced in a press release on January 10, 2006, that YOB was disbanding after almost ten years. Foster and Sato had departed six months previously and then Scheidt decided to end the band. At the same time, he also announced that he had been working with a new band called Middian.

=== Reformation and recent activities (2008–present) ===
In 2008, Scheidt and Foster reformed YOB with the intention of performing a few live shows and releasing a new album. Bassist Aaron Rieseberg joined the band in 2009, having previously played in the band Norska with his older brother Dustin. The Great Cessation was released by Profound Lore Records in 2009. The band also appeared in Europe at the 2010 Roadburn Festival in the Netherlands. YOB has since toured the United States extensively, alongside bands including Graves at Sea, Lamont, Tummler, Dove, Orange Goblin, Origin, Exhumed, The Locust, The Accüsed, Botch, Isis, Soilent Green, Uphill Battle, Playing Enemy, Will Haven, Dark Castle, Tool, and Ghostride.

The album Atma was released in 2011. In February 2014, YOB signed with Neurosis's record label Neurot Recordings. The album Clearing the Path to Ascend was released in September 2014 and attracted widespread acclaim, particularly from Rolling Stone. In early 2017, Scheidt suffered a serious health scare, which inspired the next YOB album. Our Raw Heart was released by Relapse Records in June 2018. In early 2023 Foster quit the band and Dave French took over on drums.

== Musical style and influences ==
Scheidt cites a varied range of artists as inspiration for Yob's sound, including Neurosis, Tool, Immolation, Saint Vitus, Cathedral, Soundgarden, Deep Purple, The Obsessed, Candlemass, Judas Priest, Pentagram, Trouble, Led Zeppelin, Black Sabbath, King Crimson, and Pink Floyd. His vocal style is inspired by Lee Dorrian's work in Cathedral and the lower pitched vocals of Solstice.

== Band members ==
Current

- Mike Scheidt – vocals, guitar (1996–present)
- Aaron Rieseberg – bass guitar (2009–present)
- Dave French – drums (2023–present)

Former

- Lowell Iles – bass guitar (1996–2001)
- Greg Ocon – drums (1996–2001)
- Gabe Morley – drums (2001–2003)
- Isamu Sato – bass guitar (2001–2005)
- Travis Foster – drums (2003–2005, 2008–2023)

== Discography ==
Albums

- Elaborations of Carbon (12th Records, 2002)
- Catharsis (Abstract Sounds, 2003)
- The Illusion of Motion (Metal Blade, 2004)
- The Unreal Never Lived (Metal Blade, 2005)
- The Great Cessation (Profound Lore, 2009)
- Atma (Profound Lore, 2011)
- Clearing the Path to Ascend (Neurot Recordings, 2014)
- Our Raw Heart (Relapse, 2018)

Demos

- YOB (2000)

Splits

- Label Showcase - Profound Lore Records (Scion Audio Visual, 2012)

Live albums

- Live at Roadburn 2010 (Roadburn records, 2011)
- The Unreal Never Lived: Live at Roadburn 2012 (Roadburn records, 2014)
- Pickathon 2019 - Live from the Galaxy Barn (2020)

Official videos

- "Original Face" (2018)
