= Middian =

American band

- Origin: Portland, Oregon, United States
- Genres: Doom metal, sludge metal
- Years active: 2005–2008
- Labels: Metal Blade Records
- Members: Mike Scheidt; Will Lindsay; Scott Headrick

Middian was a doom metal band from Portland, Oregon, United States. The band comprised guitarist Mike Scheidt (founder of YOB), bass guitarist/vocalist Will Lindsay, and drummer Scott Headrick. They released one album, titled Age Eternal.

== Biography ==
=== Formation ===
Guitarist Mike Scheidt formed Middian after his previous band, YOB, disbanded in 2006. He recruited Will Lindsay and Scott Headrick, who played bass guitar and drums, respectively, and formed the band Middian.

=== Music ===
The group's debut album, Age Eternal, was released on Metal Blade Records in 2007. The album was also released on 12-inch vinyl. Middian toured throughout the United States in support of this album.

=== Lawsuit ===
In October 2007, the band received a "cease and desist order" from a Wisconsin-based group "Midian" demanding that Middian stop using their name completely. Included were orders to cease all sales and existence of physical recordings by Middian. Says Mike Scheidt:

"They refused to accept our settlement, demanding we pay them tens of thousands of dollars. By right of actual usage worldwide, the name Middian is ours. Regardless, we have no choice but to fight and to defend ourselves in court. We intend to strip them of their trademark and deny them their unfair demands of money and of our music."

=== Split ===
In August 2008, Middian posted on their Myspace page that they had officially split up. The band stated that their lawsuit was coming to a close, but it had come with a high cost to the band, personally and interpersonally. Also, Mike Scheidt felt like he needed to back off from touring due to family and work issues. Scott Headrick quit the band and is moving, and Mike Scheidt and Will Lindsay will continue to make music together under a different moniker. As a result of this disbanding, Mike Scheidt also announced that his previous band, YOB, will be reforming.

== Discography ==
- Age Eternal, (full-length, 2007)
