= Boulder (band) =

American rock band

- Origin: Cleveland, Ohio, United States
- Genres: Heavy metal, hard rock
- Label: Tee Pee Records
- Past members: Jamie Walters; Patrick Munn; Terrance Hachins; Mark Gibbs

Boulder was an American rock band, formed in Cleveland, Ohio, in 1992. Members of the group had previously played in hardcore punk bands and were heavily influenced by the new wave of British heavy metal. Before releasing their debut album, The Rage of It All, they had toured in several clubs in Ohio. The group's bassist, Jamie Walters, would later play for Destructor and Midnight.

Heavy metal journalist, Ian Christe, described the group as follows:

Ohio's Boulder took nearly the same approach, cramming Melvins and Motörhead riffs into a package adorned by Flying V guitars, tributes to Michael Schenker, and artwork sampled from old Riot albums. Boulder and Cranium both demonstrated a metal paradox: They gave their all without taking themselves too seriously.

== Discography ==
- The Rage of It All (1999)
- Ravage and Savage (2000)
- Ripping Christ (2001)
- Reaped in Half (2002)
