= Weedeater (band) =

American stoner/sludge metal band

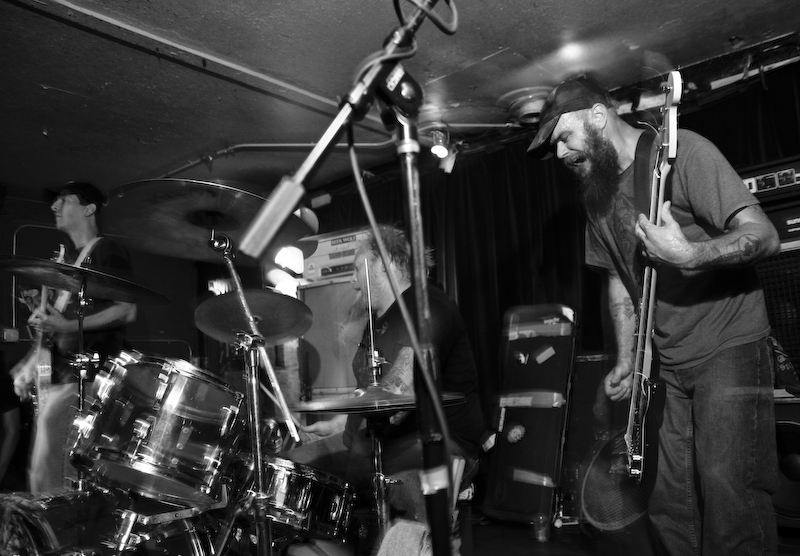
- Weedeater live at "thefunhouse" in 2008

Background information
- Origin: Wilmington, North Carolina, U.S.
- Genres: Stoner metal, sludge metal
- Years active: 1998–present
- Labels: Berserker, Crucial Blast, Southern Lord, Season of Mist
- Members: Dave "Dixie" Collins; Dave "Shep" Shepherd; Ramzi Ateyeh
- Website: weedmetal.com

Weedeater is an American doom metal band formed in Wilmington, North Carolina in 1998. The group's most recent album, Goliathan, was released in 2015.

== History ==
=== 1998–2003: Formation, ... And Justice for Y'all and Sixteen Tons ===
The band formed in 1998 and was initially planned to be the side-project of Dave "Dixie" Collins, the band's vocalist and bassist who was occupied with his primary project Buzzoven; however, the band disbanded the same year so he decided to concentrate his efforts on Weedeater and made it his new primary project, recruiting members Dave "Shep" Shepherd on guitar and Keith "Keko" Kirkum on drums.

The band released their debut album titled ... And Justice for Y'all in 2001 and their second, Sixteen Tons, in 2003; both albums were released via their first record label Berserker Records.

=== 2004–2011: God Luck and Good Speed, Jason... The Dragon, and injuries ===
After the release of Sixteen Tons in 2003, the band decided to leave Berserker Records and joined American metal record label Southern Lord Records and released their third album God Luck and Good Speed. In 2009 a deluxe double LP version on the album was also released. The band was also announced as a support act for the American heavy metal supergroup Down. The band was later announced as one of the acts to play at 2010's Hellfest among the likes of Arch Enemy, Architects and Gwar.

The band entered the studio for their fourth album with producer Steve Albini in early January 2010 (he also produced their last album God Luck and Good Speed), and Arik Roper designed the album cover as he did for the band's previous albums. Not long after they entered the studio, Dave "Dixie" Collins accidentally shot himself in the foot, blasting off one of his big toes while he was cleaning a shotgun. The band postponed their recording session with Albini.

Despite the setback, Jason...The Dragon was set for a release later that year; they also announced that their March/April tour will now be called the "Nine Toe" tour in reference to Collins losing his big toe in the accident. The band headlined again in September 2010 after a few other injuries to the band members were reported: Keko had torn his meniscus and Dave Shepherd had broken his pinkie finger; however, did not prevent the group from returning to Albini to record the album.

The album was finally released on March 15, 2011. The band went on tour in the US to support the release of the album but had to cancel the last few shows because Dave Shepherd broke his hand.

=== 2011–present: Record deal, new drummers, and Goliathan ===
In November 2013 French record label Season of Mist listed Weedeater as part of their roster, and the label re-released all of the band's previous albums digitally in December. The band also announced that they would enter the studio soon with either Albini or Billy Anderson. Travis Owen joined the band as drummer and they recorded 2015's Goliathan album with Steve Albini at his studio in Chicago. Owen left the band in 2017 due to health issues and was replaced by Carlos Denogean. However, Denogean died on August 24, 2018, after only one year in the band. The next Weedeater drummer was Ramzi Ateya, formerly of Betrayer, CWIC, Notch, and Buzzoven. Ramzi grew up with Dixie and Shep and was bandmates with Dixie in Buzzoven for the recording of the At a Loss album and subsequent tour.

== Musical style ==
Weedeater is often categorized by critics as stoner, doom and sludge metal. They have also been called "weed metal" due to their lyrics, which pertain to cannabis.

== Band members ==
Current

- Dave "Dixie" Collins – vocals, bass (1998–present)
- Dave "Shep" Shepherd – guitar (1998–present)
- Ramzi Ateyeh – drums (2019–present)

Former

- Keith "Keko" Kirkum – drums (1998–2013)
- Carlos Denogean – drums (2017–2018; his death)
- Travis Owen – drums (2013–2017, 2018–2019)

Timeline

== Discography ==
Studio albums

Title	Album details	Charts
Title	Album details	US Heat.
... And Justice for Y'all	Release: April 3, 2001; Label: Berserker; Formats: CD	—
Sixteen Tons	Release: January 24, 2003; Label: Berserker, Crucial Blast; Formats: CD	—
God Luck and Good Speed	Release: July 31, 2007; Label: Southern Lord; Formats: CD, LP	—
Jason... The Dragon	Release: March 15, 2011; Label: Southern Lord; Formats: CD, LP, digital download	45
Goliathan	Release: May 18, 2015; Label: Season of Mist; Formats: CD, LP	—
