= Queens of the Stone Age discography =

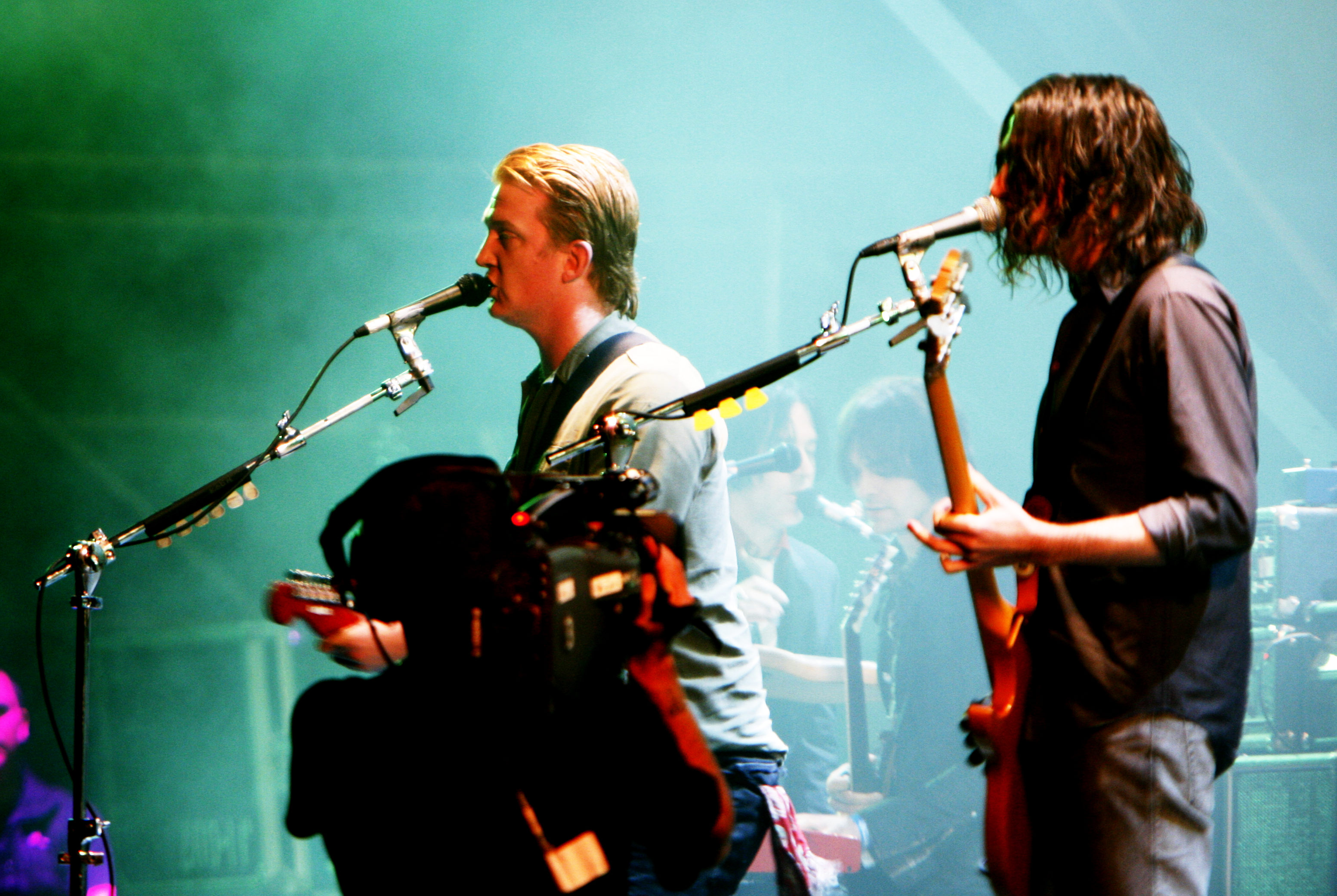
- Queens of the Stone Age performing at the Eurockéennes festival near Belfort, France, July 1, 2007. From left to right: Josh Homme, Troy Van Leeuwen, Dean Fertita, Michael Shuman.
- Studio albums: 9
- Extended plays: 5
- Live albums: 3
- Singles: 14
- Video albums: 1
- Music videos: 20
- Promotional singles: 7

The discography of Queens of the Stone Age, an American rock band, consists of nine studio albums, one live album, three extended plays, fourteen singles, three promotional singles and twenty music videos.

Queens of the Stone Age (also known as QOTSA) was formed in 1996 by guitarist and vocalist Josh Homme (formerly of Kyuss) under the name Gamma Ray. The band signed with the independent label Loosegroove Records and released the Kyuss/Queens of the Stone Age extended play in 1997. In 1998, the band released its full-length debut, Queens of the Stone Age. The band subsequently signed with Interscope Records and released its first album for a major label, Rated R, which became the first Queens of the Stone Age album to chart.

In 2001, the band was joined by vocalist Mark Lanegan, and released their third album, Songs for the Deaf in 2002. The album brought the band to a new level of commercial success, and a full-fledged tour followed in support of the album. Queens of the Stone Age released a follow-up album, Lullabies to Paralyze, in 2005. The album peaked at number five on the Billboard 200, selling 97,000 copies during its first week. Two years later, the band released its fifth studio album, Era Vulgaris, which debuted and peaked at number fourteen on the Billboard 200.

After a four-year hiatus, Queens of the Stone Age released ...Like Clockwork on June 4, 2013, their only number-one album to date on the Billboard 200, and four more years later saw the release of Villains on August 25, 2017.

On June 16, 2023, the band released the album In Times New Roman..., its eighth record, to generally favorable reviews. The release was followed by a tour in the United States and Europe in the summer.

== Albums ==
=== Studio albums ===
List of studio albums, with selected chart positions and certifications
Title	Album details	Peak chart positions										Sales	Certifications
Title	Album details	US	AUS	CAN	FRA	GER	IRL	NLD	NZ	SWI	UK	Sales	Certifications
Queens of the Stone Age	Released: September 22, 1998; Label: Loosegroove; Formats: CD, CS, LP, DI	90 (Note: Chart position for the 2022 re-release)	22 (Note: Chart position for the 2022 re-release)	—	138 (Note: Chart position for the 2011 re-release)	18 (Note: Chart position for the 2022 re-release)	99 (Note: Chart position for the 2011 re-release)	32 (Note: Chart position for the 2011 re-release)	25	25 (Note: Chart position for the 2022 re-release)	42 (Note: Chart position for the 2022 re-release)		BPI: Gold
Rated R	Released: June 6, 2000; Label: Interscope; Formats: CD, CS, LP, DI	— (Note: Rated R did not enter the US Billboard 200, but peaked at number 16 on the US Heatseekers Albums Chart.)	63	—	143 (Note: Chart position for the 2010 deluxe edition re-release.)	72	89 (Note: Chart position for the 2010 Deluxe Edition re-release.)	—	—	—	54	UK: 284,346	ARIA: Gold; BPI: Gold
Songs for the Deaf	Released: August 27, 2002; Label: Interscope; Formats: CD, CS, LP, DI	17	7	31	12	9	32	12	13	20	4	UK: 718,364	RIAA: Gold; ARIA: Platinum; BEA: Platinum; BPI: 2× Platinum; BVMI: Gold; IFPI NOR: Platinum; MC: Platinum; RMNZ: Gold
Lullabies to Paralyze	Released: March 22, 2005; Label: Interscope; Formats: CD, CS, LP, DI	5	2	5	10	8	1	4	6	4	4	UK: 274,923	ARIA: Gold; BPI: Gold; BVMI: Gold; MC: Gold; RMNZ: Gold
Era Vulgaris	Released: June 12, 2007; Label: Interscope; Formats: CD, LP, DI	14	4	5	22	5	2	7	4	4	7		BPI: Gold; MC: Gold
...Like Clockwork	Released: June 4, 2013; Label: Matador; Formats: CD, LP, USB, DI	1	1	2	8	7	1	3	2	2	2		ARIA: Platinum; BPI: Gold; MC: Gold
Villains	Released: August 25, 2017; Label: Matador; Formats: CD, LP, DI	3	1	1	4	2	2	1	1	1	1		ARIA: Gold; BPI: Gold; MC: Gold; RMNZ: Gold
In Times New Roman...	Released: June 16, 2023; Label: Matador; Formats: CD, LP, DI	9	2	30	7	2	3	1	1	2	2		
Perfecth	Released: October 30, 2026; Label: Matador; Formats: CD, LP, DI	10	1	34	11	3	9	1	2	3	1	US: 25,000	
"—" denotes a recording that did not chart or was not released in that territory.

=== Live albums ===
List of live albums, with selected chart positions
Title	Album details	Peak chart positions		
Title	Album details	US	CAN	GER
Over the Years and Through the Woods	Released: November 22, 2005; Label: Interscope; Formats: CD, DVD	186	64	100

== Extended plays ==
List of extended plays
Title	EP details
Gamma Ray	Released: 1996; Label: Man's Ruin; Formats: LP
Kyuss / Queens of the Stone Age (split with Kyuss)	Released: December 5, 1997; Label: Man's Ruin; Formats: CD
The Split CD (split with Beaver)	Released: September 18, 1998; Label: Man's Ruin; Formats: CD, LP
Stone Age Complication	Released: October 4, 2004; Label: Interscope Records; Formats: CD

=== Live extended plays ===
Title	EP details	Peak chart positions
Title	EP details	AUS
iTunes Festival: London 2013 – EP	Released: October 9, 2013; Label: Matador; Formats: DI	—
...Like Cologne	Released: November 19, 2013; Label: Self-released; Formats: DI	—
Alive in the Catacombs	Released June 5, 2025; Label: Matador; Formats: CD, LP, DI	77

== Singles ==
List of singles, with selected chart positions, showing year released and album name
Title	Year	Peak chart positions										Certifications	Album
Title	Year	US	US Rock	AUS	BEL (FL)	CAN	GER	IRL	ITA	NLD	UK	Certifications	Album
"The Lost Art of Keeping a Secret"	2000	—	— (Note: "The Lost Art of Keeping a Secret" did not enter the Billboard Hot Rock & Alternative Songs chart, but peaked at number 36 on the Alternative Airplay chart.)	75	— (Note: "The Lost Art of Keeping a Secret" did not enter the Ultratop 50, but peaked at number 30 on the Flemish Back Catalogue Singles chart.)	—	—	—	—	—	31	BPI: Silver	Rated R
"Feel Good Hit of the Summer"	2000	—	—	75	—	—	—	—	—	—	— (Note: "Feel Good Hit of the Summer" did not enter the UK Singles Chart, but peaked at number 39 on the UK Physical Singles Chart Top 100.)		Rated R
"No One Knows"	2002	51	— (Note: "No One Knows" did not enter the Billboard Hot Rock & Alternative Songs chart, but peaked at number 1 on the Alternative Airplay chart.)	—	— (Note: "No One Knows" did not enter the Ultratop 50, but peaked at number 17 on the Flemish Back Catalogue Singles chart.)	—	—	26	27	39	15	BPI: 2× Platinum; FIMI: Gold; RMNZ: 2× Platinum	Songs for the Deaf
"Go with the Flow"	2003	— (Note: "Go with the Flow" did not enter the Billboard Hot 100, but peaked at number 16 on the Bubbling Under Hot 100 Singles chart.)	— (Note: "Go with the Flow" did not enter the Billboard Hot Rock & Alternative Songs chart, but peaked at number 7 on the Alternative Airplay chart.)	39	— (Note: "Go with the Flow" did not enter the Ultratop 50, but peaked at number six on the Flemish Back Catalogue Singles chart.)	48	—	43	—	50	21	BPI: Platinum; RMNZ: Platinum	Songs for the Deaf
"First It Giveth"	2003	—	—	83	—	—	—	—	—	—	33		Songs for the Deaf
"Little Sister"	2005	88	— (Note: "Little Sister" did not enter the Billboard Hot Rock & Alternative Songs chart, but peaked at number 2 on the Alternative Airplay chart.)	40	— (Note: "Little Sister" did not enter the Ultratop 50, but peaked at number 31 on the Flemish Back Catalogue Singles chart.)	—	65	34	40	55	18	BPI: Silver; RMNZ: Gold	Lullabies to Paralyze
"In My Head"	2005	—	— (Note: "In My Head" did not enter the Billboard Hot Rock & Alternative Songs chart, but peaked at number 32 on the Alternative Airplay chart.)	—	—	—	—	—	—	—	44		Lullabies to Paralyze
"Burn the Witch"	2006	—	— (Note: "Burn the Witch" did not enter the Billboard Hot Rock & Alternative Songs chart, but peaked at number 40 on the Alternative Airplay chart.)	—	—	—	—	36	—	—	—		Lullabies to Paralyze
"Sick, Sick, Sick"	2007	—	— (Note: "Sick, Sick, Sick" did not enter the Billboard Hot Rock & Alternative Songs chart, but peaked at number 23 on the Alternative Airplay chart.)	—	—	—	77	—	—	91	165		Era Vulgaris
"3's & 7's"	2007	—	— (Note: "3's & 7's" did not enter the Billboard Hot Rock & Alternative Songs chart, but peaked at number 25 on the Alternative Airplay chart.)	—	—	—	—	36	—	—	19		Era Vulgaris
"Make It wit Chu"	2007	—	—	—	— (Note: "Make It wit Chu" did not enter the Flanders Ultratop 50, but peaked at number 8 on the Ultratip chart.)	43	90	—	—	—	101	BPI: Silver; RMNZ: Platinum	Era Vulgaris
"My God Is the Sun"	2013	—	45	—	37	—	—	92	—	77	118		...Like Clockwork
"I Sat by the Ocean"	2013	—	— (Note: "I Sat by the Ocean" did not enter the Billboard Hot Rock & Alternative Songs chart, but peaked at number 23 on the Rock & Alternative Airplay chart.)	—	— (Note: "I Sat by the Ocean" did not enter the Flanders Ultratop 50, but peaked at number 9 on the Ultratip chart.)	—	—	—	—	— (Note: "I Sat by the Ocean" did not enter the Netherlands Singles Chart but peaked on the Dutch Tipparade Chart at number nine.)	— (Note: "I Sat by the Ocean" did not enter the UK Singles Chart, but peaked at number 96 on the UK Streaming Chart.)	BPI: Silver; MC: Gold; RMNZ: Gold	...Like Clockwork
"The Way You Used to Do"	2017	—	15	—	— (Note: "The Way You Used to Do" did not enter the Flanders Ultratop 50, but peaked at number 11 on the Ultratip chart.)	— (Note: "The Way You Used to Do" did not enter the Billboard Canadian Hot 100, but peaked at number 44 on the Canadian All-format Airplay chart.)	—	—	—	—	— (Note: "The Way You Used to Do" did not enter the UK Singles Chart, but peaked at number 92 on the UK Singles Downloads Chart.)	BPI: Silver; MC: Platinum; RMNZ: Gold	Villains
"The Evil Has Landed"	2017	—	44	—	— (Note: "The Evil Has Landed" did not enter the Flanders Ultratop 50, but charted as an "extra tip" on the Ultratip chart.)	—	—	—	—	—	—		Villains
"Emotion Sickness"	2023	—	— (Note: "Emotion Sickness" did not enter the Billboard Hot Rock & Alternative Songs chart, but peaked at number 31 on the Alternative Airplay chart.)	—	—	—	—	—	—	—	—		In Times New Roman...
"Carnavoyeur"	2023	—	—	—	—	—	—	—	—	—	—		In Times New Roman...
"Paper Machete"	2023	—	— (Note: "Paper Machete" did not enter the Billboard Hot Rock & Alternative Songs chart, but peaked at number 21 on the Alternative Airplay chart.)	—	—	—	—	—	—	—	—		In Times New Roman...
"Easy Street"	2026	—	—	—	—	—	—	—	—	—	—		Perfecth
"Insignificant Other"	2026	—	—	—	—	—	—	—	—	—	—		Perfecth
"Where the Goth Girls At?"	2026	—	—	—	—	—	—	—	—	—	—		Perfecth
"Run Away from the Mob"	2026	—	—	—	—	—	—	—	—	—	—		Perfecth
"—" denotes a recording that did not chart or was not released in that territory.

=== Promotional singles ===
List of promotional singles, with selected chart positions, showing year released and album name
Title	Year	Peak chart positions						Album
Title	Year	US Main. Rock	BEL (FL) (Tip)	CAN Rock	MEX Air.	POL	UK Sales	Album
"If Only"	1998	—	—	—	—	—	—	Queens of the Stone Age
"I Was a Teenage Hand Model"	1998	—	—	—	—	—	—	Queens of the Stone Age
"Never Say Never"	2000	—	—	—	—	—	—	Non-album single
"Monsters in the Parasol"	2001	—	—	—	—	—	—	Rated R
"Everybody Knows That You're Insane"	2005	—	—	—	—	—	—	Lullabies to Paralyze
"How to Handle a Rope (A Lesson in the Lariat)"	2011	—	—	—	—	—	13	Queens of the Stone Age
"If I Had a Tail"	2013	—	5	—	—	28	—	...Like Clockwork
"The Vampyre of Time and Memory"	2013	—	—	—	49	—	—	...Like Clockwork
"Smooth Sailing"	2014	32	69	50	35	—	—	...Like Clockwork

=== Other singles ===
Title	Year	Album	Comments
"Era Vulgaris"	2007	Non-album singles	"Era Vulgaris" was released as part of a promotional contest for fans to win "a special package" from the band. On April 13, packages were sent to selected winners containing a CD entitled You Know What You Did with the sole track "Era Vulgaris".
"The Fun Machine Took a Shit & Died"	2007	Non-album singles	"The Fun Machine Took a Shit & Died" was released as a CD single with pre-ordered copies of Era Vulgaris.

== Other charted songs ==
List of songs, showing year released and album name
Title	Year	Peak chart positions						Album
Title	Year	US Rock	BEL (FL) (Tip)	CAN Rock	MEX Air.	NZ Hot	POL	Album
"Feet Don't Fail Me"	2017	41	10	11	43	— (Note: "Feet Don't Fail Me" did not enter the NZ Top 40 Singles Chart, but peaked at number eight on the NZ Heatseeker Singles Chart.)	—	Villains
"Domesticated Animals"	2017	—	22	—	—	—	—	Villains
"Head Like a Haunted House"	2017	—	—	—	—	—	63	Villains
"Hideaway"	2017	—	41	—	—	—	—	Villains
"Obscenery"	2023	—	—	—	—	17	—	In Times New Roman...
"Negative Space"	2023	—	—	—	—	20	—	In Times New Roman...
"Time & Place"	2023	—	—	—	—	22	—	In Times New Roman...
"It's Only Love"	2026	—	—	—	—	8	—	Perfecth
"Mono"	2026	—	—	—	—	11	—	Perfecth
"Sunday"	2026	—	—	—	—	10	—	Perfecth

== Other appearances ==
List of non-single guest appearances, showing year released and album name
Title	Year	Album
"18 A.D."	1997	Burn One Up! Music for Stoners
"Infinity"	2000	Heavy Metal 2000 soundtrack
"Back to Dungaree High"	2001	Alpha Motherfuckers: A Tribute to Turbonegro
"You Think I Ain't Worth a Dollar, But I Feel Like a Millionaire" (title shortened to "Millionaire")	2002	WWF: Tough Enough, Vol. 2
"Who'll Be the Next in Line"	2002	This Is Where I Belong: The Songs of Ray Davies and The Kinks
"Outlaw Blues"	2012	Chimes of Freedom: Songs of Bob Dylan Honoring 50 Years of Amnesty International
"Goodbye Yellow Brick Road"	2018	Revamp: Reimagining the Songs of Elton John & Bernie Taupin

== Music videos ==
List of music videos, showing year released and director
Title	Year	Director(s)
"The Lost Art of Keeping a Secret"	2000	John Pirozzi
"Monsters in the Parasol"	2000	Bob Stevenson
"Feel Good Hit of the Summer"	2000	Fullerene
"No One Knows"	2002	Dean Karr
"Go with the Flow"	2003	Shynola
"First It Giveth"	2003	—N/a
"Little Sister"	2005	Nathan Cox, Josh Homme
"Someone's in the Wolf"	2005	Chapman Baehler
"Everybody Knows That You're Insane"	2005	Terry Richardson
"In My Head"	2005	Associates in Science
"Burn the Witch" (version 1)	2005	Chapman Baehler
"Burn the Witch" (version 2)	2005	Liam Lynch
"Sick, Sick, Sick"	2007	Brett Simon
"3's & 7's"	2007	Paul Minor
"Make It wit Chu"	2007	Rio Hackford, Raub Shapiro
"I'm Designer"	2008	Liam Lynch
"I Appear Missing"	2013	Boneface, Liam Brazier
"Kalopsia"	2013	Boneface, Liam Brazier
"Keep Your Eyes Peeled"	2013	Boneface, Liam Brazier
"If I Had a Tail"	2013	Boneface, Liam Brazier
"My God Is the Sun"	2013	Boneface, Liam Brazier
"The Vampyre of Time and Memory"	2013	Kii Arens, Jason Trucco
"Smooth Sailing"	2014	Hiro Murai
"The Way You Used to Do"	2017	Jonas Åkerlund
"Head Like a Haunted House"	2018	Liam Lynch
"Emotion Sickness"	2023	Liam Lynch
"Carnavoyeur"	2023	Liam Lynch
"Negative Space"	2023	Liam Lynch
"Easy Street"	2026	Christopher Gruse, Tony Wolski
"Where the Goth Girls At?"	2026	Christopher Gruse, Tony Wolski
"From the Cliff"	2026	Nathalia Pizarro
