= Easy Street (Queens of the Stone Age song) =

2026 single by Queens of the Stone Age featuring Nikki Lane

Single by Queens of the Stone Age

from the album Perfecth
- Released: July 14, 2026
- Studio: Shangri-La, (Malibu); Sweetzerland (Los Angeles); Sound City (Van Nuys)
- Genre: Folk rock
- Length: 3:51
- Label: Matador
- Songwriters: Josh Homme; Dean Fertita; Michael Shuman; Jon Theodore; Troy Van Leeuwen
- Producers: Josh Homme; Michael Shuman

Queens of the Stone Age singles chronology
"Paper Machete" (2023)	"Easy Street" (2026)	"Insignificant Other" (2026)

"Easy Street" is a song by American rock band Queens of the Stone Age, marking the first release from the band in three years. It was released on July 14, 2026. Nikki Lane appears on the song.

== Background ==
Homme and Lane have been frequent collaborators, with Homme previously producing Lane's fourth studio album Denim & Diamonds (2022).

== Composition and lyrics ==
Homme and Lane sing about relationship dynamics with lines like, "You drive me crazy for sure, but I can do that myself", and mellowing out from your younger days' wildest tendencies with lines like, "I’m not like that anymore, been dead a long time". The song is about striving to finding a calmer path.

== Reception ==
Rock Sound called the song "acoustic-led, sun-stained, and beautifully peaceful", also describing it as "a blend of lovely melodies, shimmering atmospheres and poetic refrains". Stereogum described the track as "surprisingly gorgeous" before stating "Perhaps Homme has more range than we realized".

== Music video ==
The song was accompanied by a music video directed by Tony Wolski and Christopher Gruse, based on ideas by Homme. The film opens with a bruised and battered Homme attempting to outrun a fancy cowboy leading a tiny horse, a Juggalo, a mall Santa, a leather enthusiast, and people that resemble the other Queens of the Stone Age members, all of whom are pursuing him. Billboard described the video as "weird and wonderful"..

== Personnel ==
- Josh Homme – vocals, acoustic guitar, hand claps
- Troy Van Leeuwen – E-Bow guitar, hand claps
- Dean Fertita – synthesizer, piano, hand claps
- Jon Theodore – hand claps

Additional personnel

- Nikki Lane – backing vocals, hand claps
- Gregg White – recording (at Shangri-La)
- Robert Adam Stevenson – recording (at Sweetzerland)
- Mark Rankin – recording (at Sound City)
- Alan Moulder – mixing
- Finn Howells – mix assistant

== Live performances ==
The song was played throughout The Catacombs Tour as an unreleased track and later became a regular fixture on their set list during the tour.

== Charts ==
Chart performance for "Easy Street"
Chart (2026)	Peak position
Canada Modern Rock (Billboard Canada)	29
New Zealand Hot Singles (RMNZ)	29
