= Perfecth =

Studio album by Queens of the Stone Age
- Released: October 30, 2026
- Recorded: 2013; 2021; 2024–2026
- Studios: Sound City (Van Nuys); Pink Duck (Burbank); Joshua Homme's Guest House (Malibu); Sweetzerland (Los Angeles); Marigny (New Orleans); Shangri-La (Los Angeles)
- Length: 36:24
- Label: Matador
- Producers: Joshua Homme; Michael Shuman

Queens of the Stone Age chronology
Alive in the Catacombs (2025)	Perfecth (2026)

Singles from Perfecth
- 1. "Easy Street" Released: July 14, 2026; 2. "Insignificant Other" Released: August 25, 2026; 3. "Where the Goth Girls At?" Released: September 23, 2026; 4. "Run Away from the Mob" Released: October 28, 2026

Professional ratings
Aggregate scores
Source	Rating
Metacritic	80/100
Review scores
Source	Rating
AllMusic	4.5/5 stars
Consequence	B+
Exclaim!	8/10
Mojo	4/5 stars
NME	4/5 stars
Paste	C+
PopMatters	7/10
Record Collector	5/5 stars
Rolling Stone	3/5 stars
Uncut	8/10

Perfecth is the ninth studio album by the American rock band Queens of the Stone Age, released on October 30, 2026 on Matador Records. Produced by frontman Josh Homme and bass guitarist Michael Shuman, the album was preceded by the singles "Easy Street", "Insignificant Other", "Where the Goth Girls At?", and "Run Away from the Mob".

Inspired by kintsugi, the Japanese art of repairing pottery by letting cracks show, the album's material and recording sessions span several years across the band's recent lifetime, with the majority of the album being recorded between 2024 and 2026.

The album features a softer musical aesthetic, directly influenced by the band's recent extended play and concert film, Alive in the Catacombs (2025), and its accompanying Catacombs Tour, where the band explored stripped-back and theatrical song arrangements. Homme stated upon Perfecth's release: "I think the Catacombs have changed us forever, and so there is no going back – there's only forward."

== Background ==
In 2023, Queens of the Stone Age released their eighth album In Times New Roman..., after a long period of six years of inactivity for the band due to frontman Josh Homme's personal struggles. This was followed by extensive touring throughout the next few years, during which time Homme said that the band had no intention of waiting another six years for the next release. He also stated that he viewed the band's catalogue in cycles of three, and as such, whatever followed In Times New Roman... would be the start of a new era for the band.

In an interview at Download Festival in 2024, the band confirmed that they planned to finish touring later that year in order to spend more time with their families and recording new music. Touring was cut short however, due to Homme becoming ill and having to cancel several dates in the band's European summer leg. On July 8, 2024, the day before heading home, the band made a stop in Paris to record an acoustic set in the Paris Catacombs, which was released the following year as an extended play and concert film; Alive in the Catacombs (2025). At the end of the Catacombs film, Homme could be heard singing a new tune listed as "Insignificant Other", hinting at upcoming music.

Throughout late 2025 and early 2026, the band toured in support of the EP, with the sets focusing on acoustic arrangements of their older tracks. At the first show of the tour on October 2, 2025, the band debuted a new track "Easy Street", which became a staple in the setlists. The track drew comparisons to David Bowie as a distinct departure from the band's traditional sound. "Easy Street" got an official audio and music video release on July 14, 2026, featuring previous Homme collaborator Nikki Lane and marking the band's first collaborative single. On August 25, they released "Insignificant Other" as the second single. Later on September 23, they released "Where the Goth Girls At" as the third single.

== Recording ==
Perfecth was produced by frontman Josh Homme and bass guitarist Michael Shuman, with Shuman noting that he and Homme had struck up a production-related bond while recording their previous studio album, In Times New Roman... (2023): "It was just me and him for the last month or two every day, just doing the vocals and mixing the record. We really had this new bond that I didn’t think we would have, and it bled into not just the friendship, but the working relationship and what kind of vocabulary and glossary we built up with each other." Reflecting on the subsequent recording of Perfecth, Shuman stated: "On this record in particular, Josh is the wild one and loose and sometimes erratic, but in the best way possible. My job is to be more of the logical one, more linear."

Perfecth was recorded at several different studios, with specific sessions at Marigny Studios in New Orleans becoming influential to the overall sound of the album. The band opted to record in the city during its Mardi Gras festival, with drummer Jon Theodore noting, "The route for most of the parades went around the studio, so we could hear it through the walls, and we’d run outside and dance to the bands and stuff. There’s a friendly bar across the street, so if we were in some sort of rut, we’d run across the road and grab a drink, high-five our friends in the neighbourhood and get back to it." Theodore praised the sessions, stating: "The city of New Orleans ended up becoming the sixth member of the band." Homme elaborated, "It's also a dirty, magical, beautiful, dangerous, elegant place where you can leave the studio and walk the fifteen blocks to your hotel and sort of be seasoned by your journey."

"Insignificant Other" was recorded during the final sessions for the band's previous studio album, In Times New Roman... (2023). Bass guitarist and producer Michael Shuman described the song as "the foundation of Perfecth and the song that we based the whole record off of." Theodore noted, "The take you hear on the record is one we recorded at 2am, after a whole day of beating our heads against the wall and trying to crack another song. [...] In that tune, everyone is just listening to each other and improvising, doing what they wanna do."

The track, "Sunday", was previously recorded by Homme and multi-instrumentalist Dean Fertita ten years previously, while working with Iggy Pop on his album, Post Pop Depression (2016). Homme resurrected the song for Perfecth, noting: "When I wrote the main parts of "Sunday" [ten years ago], I almost kept it for myself, but then the next morning in Joshua Tree, I said to Iggy, I love you and I want you to know you have everything I have to give, and the only way I can prove that is to say I was going to keep this for myself. If I ever need it, I'll cover it." The re-recording of "Sunday" was the first track that Queens of the Stone Age worked on during its recording sessions in New Orleans, with guitarist Troy Van Leeuwen noting: "We needed a song that would kick us into gear and get rid of the dust and rust after not recording together for some time."

The album's penultimate track, "Phantom Limb", was the final song recorded for the album. It was recorded in the immediate aftermath of a guided drug trip taken by Homme.

The album's closing track, "Run Away from the Mob", dates back to the recording sessions for the band's sixth studio album, ...Like Clockwork (2013), and features Dave Grohl on drums. Frontman Josh Homme returned to the song while working on Perfecth, noting: "All the recording was done. It was just the lyric and figuring out how the vocal went."

== Release ==
In early August, they established a complaint hotline for "gripes and grievances" where fans could call and leave a message. On August 15, the band officially announced the new album with a YouTube video featuring Josh Homme and Dean Fertita playing a knife game. In the video, the two briefly discuss new music, in which Homme announces new music for a September 30 release before accidentally stabbing himself with the knife and dying. The video ends announcing the album's release on September 30, before changing to "soon ... sometime". Consequence speculated that this may indicate the album will be released on a different date, as September 30 falls on a Wednesday—and albums are typically released on Fridays. On August 25, the band fully announced the album's artwork, tracklist, and a release date of October 30. The announcement was coincided with a second single, "Insignificant Other".

== Track listing ==
All tracks are written by Joshua Homme, Dean Fertita, Jon Theodore, Michael Shuman, and Troy Van Leeuwen, except where noted.

Perfecth track listing
No.	Title	Writer(s)	Length
1.	"It's Only Love"		3:07
2.	"Insignificant Other"		5:54
3.	"Where the Goth Girls At?"		3:28
4.	"Mono"	Homme	3:19
5.	"From the Cliff"	Homme; Shuman	2:58
6.	"Sunday"	James Osterberg; Homme; Fertita	4:55
7.	"Easy Street"		3:51
8.	"Phantom Limb"		4:55
9.	"Run Away from the Mob"		3:58
Total length:			36:24

== Personnel ==
Credits are adapted from the album's liner notes.

=== Queens of the Stone Age ===
- Joshua Homme – vocals, production (all tracks); electric guitar (tracks 1–4, 6, 9), acoustic guitar (1, 5, 7, 9), marimba (1), mixing (4, 6, 8); bass guitar, keyboards, Fun Machine, recording (4); piano, Mellotron (5); Clavinet (6), claps (7)
- Michael Shuman – production (all tracks), keyboard bass (1), bass guitar (2, 3, 6, 8, 9), backing vocals (2, 9); vocals, acoustic guitar (5); Mellotron, mixing (8)
- Troy Van Leeuwen – electric guitar (1–3, 6, 8, 9), piano (6), EBow guitar (7), handclaps (7), acoustic guitar (8)
- Dean Fertita – piano (1, 2, 4, 6, 7–9), Wurlitzer (2), synthesizers (2, 3, 7–9), electric guitar (3), slide guitar (5), handclaps (6, 7); Mellotron, Marxophone (9)
- Jon Theodore – drums (1–6, 8), claps (6, 7), backing vocals (6)

=== Additional contributors ===
- Dale Becker – mastering
- Katie Harvey – mastering assistance
- Noah McCorkle – mastering assistance
- Adam Burt – mastering assistance
- Mark Rankin – recording (1–3, 5–7, 9), mixing (1–3, 9), drums and strings recording (4)
- Gregg White – recording assistance (1, 3–5), recording (7)
- Richard Dodd – cello (1, 3, 4, 6)
- Eric Gorfain – violin (1, 3, 4, 6)
- Daphne Chen – violin (1, 3, 4, 6)
- Leah Katz – viola (1, 3, 4, 6)
- Robert Adam Stevenson – recording (2, 7–9), recording assistance (6), piano, mixing (8)
- Danielle Ondarza – French horn (3)
- Garrett Smith – trombone (3)
- Devon Tayor – tuba (3)
- Javier Gonzalez – trumpet (3)
- Justin Smith – mixing (5), recording assistance (6)
- Bridgett Barkan – backing vocals (6)
- Amber Martin – backing vocals (6)
- Jake Shears – backing vocals (6)
- Nikki Lane – backing vocals, claps (7)
- Alan Moulder – mixing (7)
- Finn Howells – mixing assistance (7)
- Dave Grohl – drums (9)
- Morning Breath Inc. – art direction, design
- Andreas Neumann – photography

== Charts ==
=== Weekly charts ===
Weekly chart performance
Chart (2026)	Peak position
Australian Albums (ARIA)	1
Austrian Albums (Ö3 Austria)	1
Belgian Albums (Ultratop Flanders)	2
Belgian Albums (Ultratop Wallonia)	4
Canadian Albums (Billboard)	34
Croatian International Albums (HDU)	1
Danish Albums (Hitlisten)	10
Dutch Albums (Album Top 100)	1
Finnish Albums (Suomen virallinen lista)	4
French Albums (SNEP)	11
French Rock & Metal Albums (SNEP)	1
German Albums (Offizielle Top 100)	3
German Rock & Metal Albums (Offizielle Top 100)	1
Hungarian Physical Albums (MAHASZ)	8
Irish Albums (Official Charts)	9
Irish Independent Albums (IRMA)	2
Italian Albums (FIMI)	12
Japanese Albums (Oricon)	45
Japanese Digital Albums (Oricon)	91
Japanese Rock Albums (Oricon)	10
New Zealand Albums (RMNZ)	2
Norwegian Albums (IFPI Norge)	17
Polish Albums (ZPAV)	10
Portuguese Albums (AFP)	8
Scottish Albums (Official Charts)	2
Spanish Albums (Promusicae)	10
Swedish Albums (Sverigetopplistan)	10
Swiss Albums (Schweizer Hitparade)	3
UK Albums (Official Charts)	1
UK Independent Albums (Official Charts)	1
US Billboard 200	10

=== Monthly charts ===
Monthly chart performance
Chart (2026)	Position
Croatian International Vinyl Albums (HDU)	2
