= Where the Goth Girls At? =

2026 single by Queens of the Stone Age

Single by Queens of the Stone Age

from the album Perfecth
- Released: September 23, 2026
- Studio: Sound City (Van Nuys)
- Genre: Rock
- Length: 3:28
- Label: Matador
- Songwriters: Josh Homme; Dean Fertita; Michael Shuman; Jon Theodore; Troy Van Leeuwen
- Producers: Josh Homme; Michael Shuman

Queens of the Stone Age singles chronology
"Insignificant Other" (2026)	"Where the Goth Girls At?" (2026)	"Run Away from the Mob" (2026)

Music video
- "Where the Goth Girls At?" on YouTube

"Where the Goth Girls At?" is a song by American rock band Queens of the Stone Age. It was released as the third single to Perfecth on September 23, 2026. The song centers on themes of teenage love and the desire to impress others.

== Composition and lyrics ==
In an interview with Consequence of Sound, Homme revealed that the lyric "Never felt so alive as the day I almost died" was related to the time that he almost drowned at age 12 during a boating accident in Idaho. The title is about Homme's teenage infatuation with the "goth girls" who worked at his local JCPenney.

NME described the song as pairing "minimalist riffs with an explosive chorus, amplified by some rich string and horn arrangements".

== Reception ==
The song title was described as leaving "the mind reeled with possibilities" by Stereogum, "lean, sexy" by Revolver, and "dirty" by Kerrang!. Blabbermouth.net said the song was "provocative in the most essential sense. Unafraid to explore the dark, the sexual, the surreal, the absurd. It's art that snarls and seduces in equal measure, and never more so".

== Music video ==
Christopher Gruse and Tony Wolski directed the video where Homme plays a scientist in a world where a goth girl played by Lou Lou Safran causes a zombie plague where goth girls rule supreme. The video also includes a cameo from comedian Steve Agee and dancer Scarlett Kapella.

== Personnel ==
Credits are adapted from the album's liner notes.

Queens of the Stone Age

- Joshua Homme – vocals, electric guitar, production
- Michael Shuman – bass guitar, production
- Troy Van Leeuwen – electric guitar
- Dean Fertita – synthesizers, electric guitar
- Jon Theodore – drums

Additional personnel

- Richard Dodd – cello
- Eric Gorfain – violin
- Daphne Chen – violin
- Leah Katz – viola
- Danielle Ondarza – French horn
- Garrett Smith – trombone
- Devon Tayor – tuba
- Javier Gonzalez – trumpet
- Mark Rankin – recording, mixing
- Gregg White – recording assistance

== Charts ==
Chart performance for "Where the Goth Girls At?"
Chart (2026)	Peak position
Canada Modern Rock (Billboard Canada)	28
New Zealand Hot Singles (RMNZ)	38
