= The End Is Nero World Tour =

2023–25 concert tour by Queens of the Stone Age

- Tour by Queens of the Stone Age
- Location: Europe; North America; Oceania; Asia
- Associated album: In Times New Roman...
- Start date: August 3, 2023
- End date: August 28, 2025
- Legs: 10
- No. of shows: 133

Queens of the Stone Age concert chronology
- Villains World Tour (2017–2018); The End is Nero World Tour (2023–2025); The Catacombs Tour (2025)

The End Is Nero World Tour was a concert tour by American rock band Queens of the Stone Age to support the band's eighth studio album, In Times New Roman..., which was released in June 2023. The tour began in Sterling Heights, Michigan on August 3, 2023, and ended in Sheffield on August 28, 2025. Various artists appeared as the opening act: Phantogram, The Armed, Viagra Boys and Jehnny Beth on the first leg, The Chats and Deep Tan on the first European leg, Spiritualized on the third leg, Spiderbait, Pond, Gut Heatlh, Lola Scott and Earth Tongue on the Oceanian leg.

Several European shows were cancelled in mid-2024 due to Josh Homme's health. Around this time, the band played in the Catacombs of Paris and recorded the live album/film Alive in the Catacombs.

== Tour dates ==
Date	City	Country	Venue	Opening act
Leg 1: North America
3 August 2023	Sterling Heights	United States	Michigan Lottery Amphitheatre	Phantogram; The Armed
4 August 2023	Toronto	Canada	Budweiser Stage	Phantogram; The Armed
5 August 2023	Pittsburgh	United States	Stage AE	Phantogram; The Armed
7 August 2023	Bridgeport	United States	Hartford HealtCare Amphitheater	Phantogram; The Armed
8 August 2023	Philadelphia	United States	TD Pavilion	Phantogram; The Armed
9 August 2023	Washington	United States	The Anthem	Phantogram; The Armed
11 August 2023	Portland	United States	Cross Insurance Arena	Phantogram; The Armed
12 August 2023	Queens	United States	Forest Hills Stadium	Phantogram; The Armed
14 August 2023	Washington	United States	The Anthem	Phantogram; The Armed
16 August 2023	Asheville	United States	Rabbit Rabbit	Phantogram; The Armed
18 August 2023	Atlanta	United States	Fox Theatre	Phantogram; The Armed
19 August 2023	Nashville	United States	Ascend Amphitheater	Phantogram; The Armed
16 September 2023 (Note: Part of Riot Fest.)	Chicago	United States	Douglass Park	—N/a
17 September 2023	Minneapolis	United States	Minneapolis Armory	Viagra Boys; Jehnny Beth
19 September 2023	Omaha	United States	Steelhouse Omaha	Viagra Boys; Jehnny Beth
20 September 2023	Kansas City	United States	Starlight Theatre	Viagra Boys; Jehnny Beth
22 September 2023	Indianapolis	United States	TCU Amphitheater	Viagra Boys; Jehnny Beth
23 September 2023	Maryland Heights	United States	Saint Louis Music Park	Viagra Boys; Jehnny Beth
24 September 2023 (Note: Part of Louder Than Life festival.)	Louisville	United States	Kentucky Exposition Center	—N/a
26 September 2023	Rogers	United States	Walmart Amphitheatre	Viagra Boys; Jehnny Beth
27 September 2023	Oklahoma City	United States	The Criterion	Viagra Boys; Jehnny Beth
29 September 2023	Greenwood Village	United States	Fiddler's Green Amphitheatre	Viagra Boys; Jehnny Beth
2 October 2023	Portland	United States	Veterans Memorial Coliseum	Viagra Boys; Jehnny Beth
3 October 2023	Vancouver	Canada	Pacific Coliseum	Viagra Boys; Jehnny Beth
4 October 2023	Seattle	United States	Climate Pledge Arena	Viagra Boys; Jehnny Beth
6 October 2023	San Francisco	United States	Bill Graham Civic Auditorium	Viagra Boys; Jehnny Beth
8 October 2023 (Note: Part of Aftershock Festival.)	Sacramento	United States	Discovery Park	—N/a
14 October 2023 (Note: Part of Tecate Coordenada festival.)	Guadalajara	Mexico	Valle VFG	—N/a
Leg 2: Europe
4 November 2023	Amsterdam	Netherlands	Ziggo Dome	The Chats; Deep Tan
5 November 2023	Esch-sur-Alzette	Luxembourg	Rockhal	The Chats; Deep Tan
7 November 2023	Paris	France	Accor Arena	The Chats; Deep Tan
8 November 2023	Frankfurt	Germany	Jahrhunderthalle	The Chats; Deep Tan
9 November 2023	Berlin	Germany	Max-Schmeling-Halle	The Chats; Deep Tan
11 November 2023	Düsseldorf	Germany	Mitsubishi Electric Halle	The Chats; Deep Tan
12 November 2023	Merksem	Belgium	Sportpaleis	The Chats; Deep Tan
14 November 2023	Manchester	England	Manchester Arena	The Chats; Deep Tan
15 November 2023	London	England	The O2 Arena	The Chats; Deep Tan
16 November 2023	Bournemouth	England	Bournemouth International Centre	The Chats; Deep Tan
18 November 2023	Glasgow	Scotland	OVO Hydro	The Chats; Deep Tan
19 November 2023	Birmingham	England	Resorts World Arena	The Chats; Deep Tan
20 November 2023	Stockton-on-Tees	England	Globe Theatre	The Chats; Deep Tan
22 November 2023	Dublin	Ireland	3Arena	The Chats; Deep Tan
Leg 3: North America
5 December 2023	Phoenix	United States	Arizona Financial Theatre	Spiritualized
6 December 2023	El Paso	United States	Abraham Chavez Theatre	Spiritualized
8 December 2023	Austin	United States	Moody Center	Spiritualized
9 December 2023	Houston	United States	713 Music Hall	Spiritualized
10 December 2023	Irving	United States	Toyota Music Factory	Spiritualized
12 December 2023	Albuquerque	United States	Revel Entertainment Center	Spiritualized
15 December 2023	San Diego	United States	Viejas Arena	Spiritualized
16 December 2023	Inglewood	United States	Kia Forum	Spiritualized
Leg 4: Japan
5 February 2024	Osaka	Japan	Zepp Namba	—N/a
7 February 2024	Tokyo	Japan	Tokyo Dome City Hall	—N/a
Leg 5: Oceania
10 February 2024	Perth	Australia	Red Hill Auditorium	Pond; Gut Heatlh
13 February 2024	Adelaide	Australia	The Drive	Pond; Gut Heatlh
16 February 2024	Hobart	Australia	Mona Lawns	Pond; Gut Heatlh
18 February 2024	Torquay	Australia	Torquay Common	The Chats; Spiderbait; Pond; Gut Heatlh; Lola Scott
19 February 2024	Melbourne	Australia	Sidney Myer Music Bowl	Pond; Gut Heatlh
21 February 2024	Sydney	Australia	Hordern Pavilion	Pond; Gut Heatlh
22 February 2024	Sydney	Australia	Hordern Pavilion	Pond; Gut Heatlh
24 February 2024	Gold Coast	Australia	Broadwater Parklands	The Chats; Spiderbait; Pond; Gut Heatlh; Lola Scott
25 February 2024	Brisbane	Australia	Fortitude Music Hall	Pond; Gut Heatlh
26 February 2024	Brisbane	Australia	Fortitude Music Hall	Pond; Gut Heatlh
29 February 2024	Auckland	New Zealand	Spark Arena	Pond; Earth Tongue
1 March 2024	Wellington	New Zealand	TSB Arena	Pond; Earth Tongue
3 March 2024	Christchurch	New Zealand	Wolfbrook Arena	Pond; Earth Tongue
Leg 6: Canada
1 April 2024	Calgary	Canada	Scotiabank Saddledome	The Struts
3 April 2024	Saskatoon	Canada	SaskTel Centre	The Struts
5 April 2024	Winnipeg	Canada	Canada Life Centre	The Struts
8 April 2024	Oshawa	Canada	Tribute Communities Centre	The Struts
9 April 2024	Kingston	Canada	Leon's Centre	The Struts
10 April 2024	London	Canada	Budweiser Gardens	The Struts
12 April 2024	Ottawa	Canada	Canadian Tire Centre	The Struts
13 April 2024	Laval	Canada	Place Bell	The Struts
14 April 2024	Quebec City	Canada	Videotron Centre	The Struts
16 April 2024	Moncton	Canada	Avenir Centre	The Struts
17 April 2024	Halifax	Canada	Scotiabank Centre	The Struts
Leg 7: United States
2 May 2024 (Note: Originally scheduled for August 16.)	Raleigh	United States	Red Hat Amphitheater	Royal Blood
4 May 2024 (Note: Part of Shaky Knees Music Festival.)	Atlanta	United States	Central Park	—N/a
6 May 2024	Portsmouth	United States	Atlantic Union Bank Pavilion	Royal Blood
7 May 2024	Wilmington	United States	Live Oak Bank Pavilion	Royal Blood
8 May 2024	North Charleston	United States	Firefly Distillery	Royal Blood
10 May 2024	Hollywood	United States	Hard Rock Live	Royal Blood
11 May 2024 (Note: Part of Welcome to Rockville.)	Daytona Beach	United States	Daytona International Speedway	—N/a
24 May 2024	Santa Barbara	United States	Santa Barbara Bowl	Bully
26 May 2024 (Note: Part of BottleRock Napa Valley.)	Napa	United States	Napa Valley Expo	—N/a
Leg 8: Europe
7 June 2024 (Note: Part of Rock am Ring.)	Nürburg	Germany	Nürburgring	—N/a
9 June 2024 (Note: Part of Rock im Park.)	Nuremberg	Germany	Zeppelinfeld	—N/a
11 June 2024	Hamburg	Germany	Alsterdorfer Sporthalle	Bones UK
14 June 2024 (Note: Part of Download Festival.)	Leicestershire	England	Donington Park	—N/a
18 June 2024	A Coruña	Spain	Coliseum da Coruña	Bala
20 June 2024 (Note: Part of Noches del Botánico.)	Madrid	Spain	Real Jardín Botánico de Madrid	Ade Martín
21 June 2024 (Note: Part of Azkena Rock Festival.)	Vitoria-Gasteiz	Spain	Mendizabala	—N/a
23 June 2024 (Note: Part of the Marenostrum Fuengirola festival.)	Fuengirola	Spain	Marenostrum Castle Park	Bala
26 June 2024 (Note: Part of the ALMA Barcelona festival.)	Barcelona	Spain	Poble Espanyol	—N/a
28 June 2024 (Note: Part of the Open Air St. Gallen festival.)	St. Gallen	Switzerland	St. Gallen	—N/a
30 June 2024 (Note: Part of the Hellfest.)	Clisson	France	Val de Moine	—N/a
4 July 2024 (Note: Part of the Roma Summer Fest.)	Rome	Italy	Auditorium Parco della Musica	—N/a
6 July 2024 (Note: Part of the I-Days festival.)	Milan	Italy	Ippodromo SNAI San Siro	Royal Blood (band)
Leg 9: North America
10 June 2025	Boston	United States	MGM Music Hall at Fenway	The Kills
11 June 2025	Boston	United States	MGM Music Hall at Fenway	The Kills
13 June 2025	Atlantic City	United States	Hard Rock Live at Etess Arena	The Kills
17 June 2025	Columbus	United States	KEMBA Live!	The Kills
18 June 2025	Cincinnati	United States	Andrew J. Brady Music Center	The Kills
20 June 2025	Madison	United States	Breese Stevens Field	The Kills
21 June 2025	Chicago	United States	Huntington Bank Pavilion	The Kills
Leg 10: Europe
12 July 2025 (Note: Part of Pohoda.)	Trenčín	Slovakia	Trenčín Airport	—N/a
13 July 2025	Vienna	Austria	Wiener Stadthalle	Blondshell
15 July 2025 (Note: Part of Pistoia Blues Festival.)	Pistoia	Italy	Piazza del Duomo	The Amazons
16 July 2025 (Note: Part of AMA Music Festival.)	Romano d'Ezzelino	Italy	Villa Negri	The Kills; The Amazons
19 July 2025 (Note: Part of Electric Castle.)	Cluj	Romania	Bonțida Bánffy Castle	—N/a
19 July 2025	Budapest	Hungary	Budapest Park	So Good
22 July 2025	Zagreb	Croatia	ŠRC Šalata	So Good
23 July 2025	Zagreb	Croatia	ŠRC Šalata	So Good
25 July 2025	Munich	Germany	Zenith	So Good
26 July 2025 (Note: Part of Paléo Festival.)	Nyon	Switzerland	Plaine de l'Asse	—N/a
27 July 2025	Stuttgart	Germany	Hanns-Martin-Schleyer-Halle	So Good
30 July 2025	Warsaw	Poland	COS Torwar	So Good
1 August 2025	Riga	Latvia	Xiaomi Arena	So Good
2 August 2025	Tallinn	Estonia	Unibet Arena Black Box	So Good
4 August 2025	Helsinki	Finland	Ice Hall	So Good
7 August 2025 (Note: Part of Way Out West.)	Gothenburg	Sweden	Slottsskogen	—N/a
8 August 2025 (Note: Part of Øyafestivalen.)	Oslo	Norway	Tøyen Park	—N/a
9 August 2025 (Note: Part of Part of Syd for Solen festival.)	Copenhagen	Denmark	Valbyparken	—N/a
12 August 2025 (Note: Part of Citadel Music Festival.)	Berlin	Germany	Spandau Citadel	So Good
13 August 2025 (Note: Part of KUNST!Rasen festival.)	Bonn	Germany	Kunstrasen Bonn	So Good
15 August 2025 (Note: Part of Lowlands.)	Biddinghuizen	Netherlands	Spijk en Bremerberg	—N/a
16 August 2025 (Note: Part of the Cabaret Vert festival.)	Charleville-Mézières	France	Square Bayard	—N/a
17 August 2025 (Note: Part of the Pukkelpop festival.)	Hasselt	Belgium	Kiewit	—N/a
20 August 2025	Kilmainham	Ireland	Royal Hospital Kilmainham	Amyl and the Sniffers; So Good
22 August 2025 (Note: Part of Victorious Festival.)	Portsmouth	England	Southsea Seafront	—N/a
24 August 2025 (Note: Part of Rock en Seine.)	Paris	France	Parc de Saint-Cloud	—N/a
27 August 2025 (Note: Part of Rock N Roll Circus.)	Sheffield	England	Don Valley Bowl	—N/a
28 August 2025 (Note: Part of Rock N Roll Circus.)	Sheffield	England	Don Valley Bowl	—N/a

=== Cancelled dates ===
Date	City	Country	Venue	Reason
9 September 2023 (Note: Part of The Town festival.)	São Paulo	Brazil	Interlagos Circuit	Doctor's advice
30 September 2023	Salt Lake City	United States	The Great Saltair	Severe Weather
2 April 2024	Edmonton	Canada	Rogers Place	Illness
5 July 2024 (Note: Part of the AMA Music Festival.)	Bassano del Grappa	Italy	Villa Ca' Cornaro	Josh Homme's health
10 July 2024 (Note: Part of the Jardin Sonore festival.)	Vitrolles	France	Domaine de Fontblanche	Josh Homme's health
13 July 2024 (Note: Part of the Pohoda festival.)	Trenčín	Slovakia	Trenčín Airport	Josh Homme's health
16 July 2024	Berlin	Germany	Spandau Citadel	Josh Homme's health
17 July 2024 (Note: Part of the Colours of Ostrava festival.)	Ostrava	Czech Republic	Vitkovice	Josh Homme's health
18 July 2024 (Note: Part of the METAStadt Open Air festival.)	Vienna	Austria	METAStadt	Josh Homme's health
20 July 2024 (Note: Part of the Electric Castle festival.)	Bonțida	Romania	Bonțida Bánffy Castle	Josh Homme's health
23 July 2024	Zagreb	Croatia	ŠRC Šalata	Josh Homme's health
24 July 2024	Zagreb	Croatia	ŠRC Šalata	Josh Homme's health
27 July 2024 (Note: Part of the Athens Rock festival.)	Athens	Greece	Athens Olympic Sports Complex	Josh Homme's health
8 August 2024 (Note: Part of the Way Out West festival.)	Gothenburg	Sweden	Slottsskogen	Josh Homme's health
9 August 2024 (Note: Part of the Oya festival.)	Oslo	Norway	Tøyen Park	Josh Homme's health
10 August 2024 (Note: Part of the Syd For Solen festival.)	Copenhagen	Denmark	Valbyparken	Josh Homme's health
15 August 2024 (Note: Part of the Cabaret Vert festival.)	Charleville-Mézières	France	Square Bayard	Josh Homme's health
16 August 2024 (Note: Part of Lowlands.)	Biddinghuizen	Netherlands	Spijk en Bremerberg	Josh Homme's health
18 August 2024 (Note: Part of the Pukkelpop festival.)	Hasselt	Belgium	Kiewit	Josh Homme's health
21 August 2024 (Note: Part of the Vilar de Mouros Festival.)	Vilar de Mouros	Portugal	Vilar de Mouros	Josh Homme's health
29 September 2024	Bridgeport	United States	Seaside Park	Josh Homme's health
6 October 2024	Memphis	United States	Mempho Music Festival	Josh Homme's health
17 November 2024	Mexico City	Mexico	Corona Capital Festival	Josh Homme's health
15 June 2025 (Note: Part of Bonnaroo.)	Manchester	United States	Great Stage Park	Severe weather
