= Malibu =

Malibu may refer to:

== Places ==
- Malibu, California, a United States city
  - Malibu High School
  - Malibu Lake
  - Malibu Creek
- Malibu, British Columbia, a locality in Canada
- Baja Malibu, a beach in Rosarito Beach Municipality, Baja California, Mexico

== Arts, entertainment, and media ==
=== Music ===
- Malibu (album), 2016, by Anderson Paak
- "Malibu" (Hole song), 1998
- "Malibu" (Miley Cyrus song), 2017
- "Malibu" (Kim Petras song), 2020
- "Malibu" (Sangiovanni song), 2021
- "Malibu" (The Driver Era song), 2022
- "Malibu", a jazz standard written by Benny Carter, included in Benny Carter Songbook Volume II
- "Malibú", a 1999 song by Jagúar
- "Malibu", a 2021 song by Migos and Polo G from Culture III
- "Malibu", a 1995 song by Chick from Someone's Ugly Daughter
- "Malibu", a 1978 song by Patricia Paay
- "Malibu", a 1964 song by The Tymes
- "Malibu", a 2020 song by Trixie Mattel from the album Barbara
- Malibu, a French ambient musician

=== Other arts, entertainment, and media ===
- Malibu, one of the American Gladiators, portrayed by Deron McBee
- Malibu (film), a 1983 television miniseries
- Malibu, a character played by Sharon Tate in the film Don't Make Waves
- Malibu, CA (TV series), an American sitcom that aired between 1998 and 2000
- Malibu Comics, a comic book publisher
- Malibu Beach (film)
- Malibu Barbie, a variant of Barbie doll launched in 1971
- Malibu Stacy, a fictional plastic doll in the "Lisa vs. Malibu Stacy" episode of the television series The Simpsons

== Transportation and sports ==
- Malibu, a type of surfboard
- Chevrolet Malibu, an automobile
- Malibu Boats, a boat manufacturer
- Moyes Malibu, an Australian hang glider design
- Piper PA-46, a single engine aircraft
- M/V Malibu, a yacht

== Other uses ==
- Roger Joseph Manning Jr. (born 1966), American electronic music artist known as Malibu
- Malibu (rum), a coconut-flavored liqueur
- Malibu languages, a group of extinct languages once spoken in Colombia

== See also ==
- 2000 Malibu Road, a 1992 American sitcom
- Malibu Country, a 2012 American sitcom
