= The Catacombs Tour =

2025 concert tour by Queens of the Stone Age

- Tour by Queens of the Stone Age
- Location: Europe; North America
- Associated album: Alive in the Catacombs
- Start date: October 2, 2025
- End date: May 1, 2026
- Legs: 2
- No. of shows: 24

Queens of the Stone Age concert chronology
- The End Is Nero World Tour (2023–2025); The Catacombs Tour (2025 - 2026)

The Catacombs Tour was a concert tour by the American rock band Queens of the Stone Age to support the band's extended play, Alive in the Catacombs, which was released in June 2025. The tour was set to occur across multiple historic North American theaters (Note: With the exception of two outdoor festival shows in Mexico, part of Corona Capital festival.), beginning at the Chicago Theatre in Chicago on October 2, 2025, and ending at the Thunder Valley Casino in Lincoln on May 1, 2026. The band indicated that the tour is inspired from their experience recording Alive in the Catacombs from within the Paris Catacombs. On 29 October 2025 Matt Berry made a guest appearance on "Long Slow Goodbye" playing the cover halls organ.

The first leg was in 2025, while the second leg consisting of 6 shows took place late April / early May 2026. On the first show of the second leg in Joshua Tree, former member Nick Oliveri provided guest vocals on "Auto Pilot". This was his first performance with the band in 12 years.

Their KEXP broadcast show was uploaded to Youtube on June 15 2026.

== Tour dates ==
Date	City	Country	Venue
2 October 2025	Chicago	United States	Chicago Theatre
3 October 2025	Detroit	United States	Fox Theatre
5 October 2025	Toronto	Canada	Massey Hall
7 October 2025	Philadelphia	United States	The Met
8 October 2025	Boston	United States	Boch Center
10 October 2025	New York City	United States	Beacon Theatre
18 October 2025	Milan	Italy	Teatro Lirico Giorgio Gaber
20 October 2025	Paris	France	Le Grand Rex
23 October 2025	Berlin (cancelled)	Germany	Theater des Westens
24 October 2025	Copenhagen	Denmark	Koncerthuset
26 October 2025	Amsterdam	Netherlands	Royal Theater Carré
27 October 2025	Antwerp	Belgium	Queen Elisabeth Hall
29 October 2025	London	England	Royal Albert Hall
8 November 2025	Santa Barbara	United States	Arlington Theatre
10 November 2025	San Francisco	United States	Davies Symphony Hall
11 November 2025	Los Angeles	United States	Dolby Theatre
12 November 2025 (Note: Part of "Corona Capital Sessions" in support of Foo Fighters.)	Monterrey	Mexico	Estadio Borregos
14 November 2025 (Note: Part of Corona Capital festival.)	Mexico City	Mexico	Autódromo Hermanos Rodríguez
19 November 2025	Austin	United States	Bass Concert Hall
21 November 2025	New Orleans	United States	Saenger Theatre
24 April 2026	Joshua Tree	United States	Joshua Tree Retreat Center
25 April 2026	Rancho Mirage	United States	Agua Caliente Casino
27 April 2026	Portland	United States	Arlene Schnitzer Concert Hall
28 April 2026 (Note: Radio broadcast performance)	Seattle	United States	KEXP Studios
29 April 2026	Seattle	United States	Paramount Theater
1 May 2026	Lincoln	United States	Thunder Valley Casino

== Setlist ==
Setlist taken from Royal Albert Hall on 29 October 2025. Same setlist every night other than 28 April 2026 on the KEXP broadcast where only Act II was performed.

Act I
No.	Title	Original album	Length
1.	"Running Joke / Paper Machete"	Era Vulgaris (2007) / In Times New Roman... (2023)
2.	"Kalopsia"	...Like Clockwork (2013)
3.	"Villains of Circumstance"	Villains (2017)
4.	"Suture Up Your Future"	Era Vulgaris (2007)
5.	"I Never Came"	Lullabies to Paralyze (2005)

Act II
No.	Title	Original album	Length
6.	"Someone's in the Wolf / A Song for the Deaf / Straight Jacket Fitting"	Lullabies to Paralyze (2005) / Songs for the Deaf (2002) / In Times New Roman... (2023)
7.	"Mosquito Song"	Songs for the Deaf (2002)
8.	"Keep Your Eyes Peeled"	...Like Clockwork (2013)
9.	"Spinning in Daffodils" (Them Crooked Vultures cover)	Them Crooked Vultures (2009)

Act III
No.	Title	Original album	Length
10.	""You Got a Killer Scene There, Man...""	Lullabies to Paralyze (2005)
11.	"Hideaway"	Villains (2017)
12.	"The Vampyre of Time and Memory"	...Like Clockwork (2013)
13.	"Auto Pilot"	Rated R (2000)
14.	"Easy Street"	Perfecth (2026)
15.	"Fortress"	Villains (2017)
16.	"...Like Clockwork"	...Like Clockwork (2013)

Encore
No.	Title	Original album	Length
17.	"Long Slow Goodbye" (Josh Homme and Michael Shuman duet)	Lullabies to Paralyze (2005)
