= Bala (band) =

Galician stoner rock/grunge band

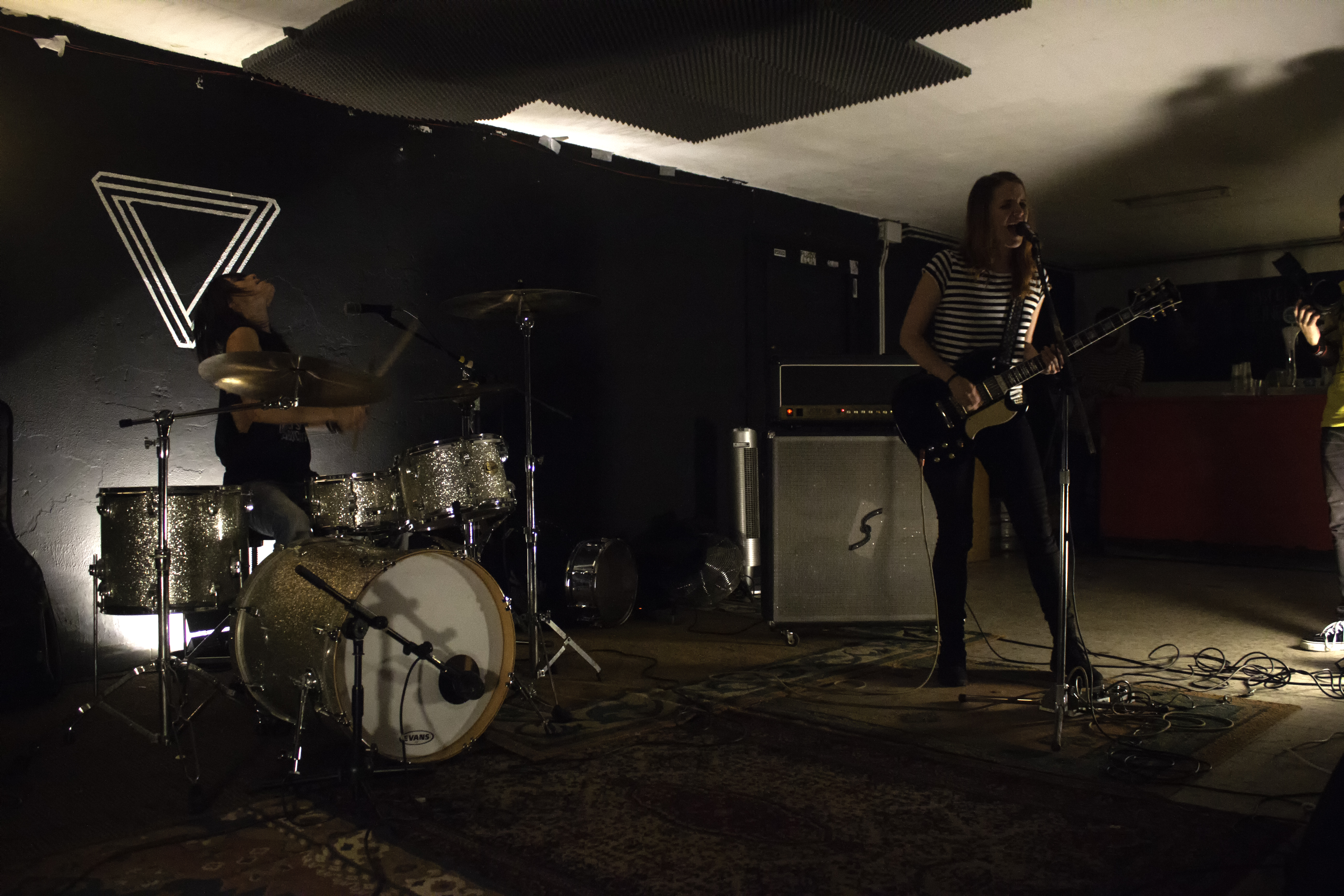
Bala in 2014

Bala is a Galician stoner rock/grunge band that consists of Anxela Baltar from A Coruña (guitar and vocals) and Violeta Mosquera from Pontevedra (drums and vocals). On 14 September 2015, they released their debut work, a seven-song album called Human Flesh, and on 3 March 2017 they released Lume, both on the record label Matapadre from Santiago de Compostela. Maleza followed in 2021 on Century Media.

== Discography ==
Álbum	Year	Record label
Human Flesh	2015	Matapadre
Lume	2017	Matapadre
Maleza	2021	Century Media
Besta	2024	Self Produced
