= Queens of the Stone Age =

American rock band

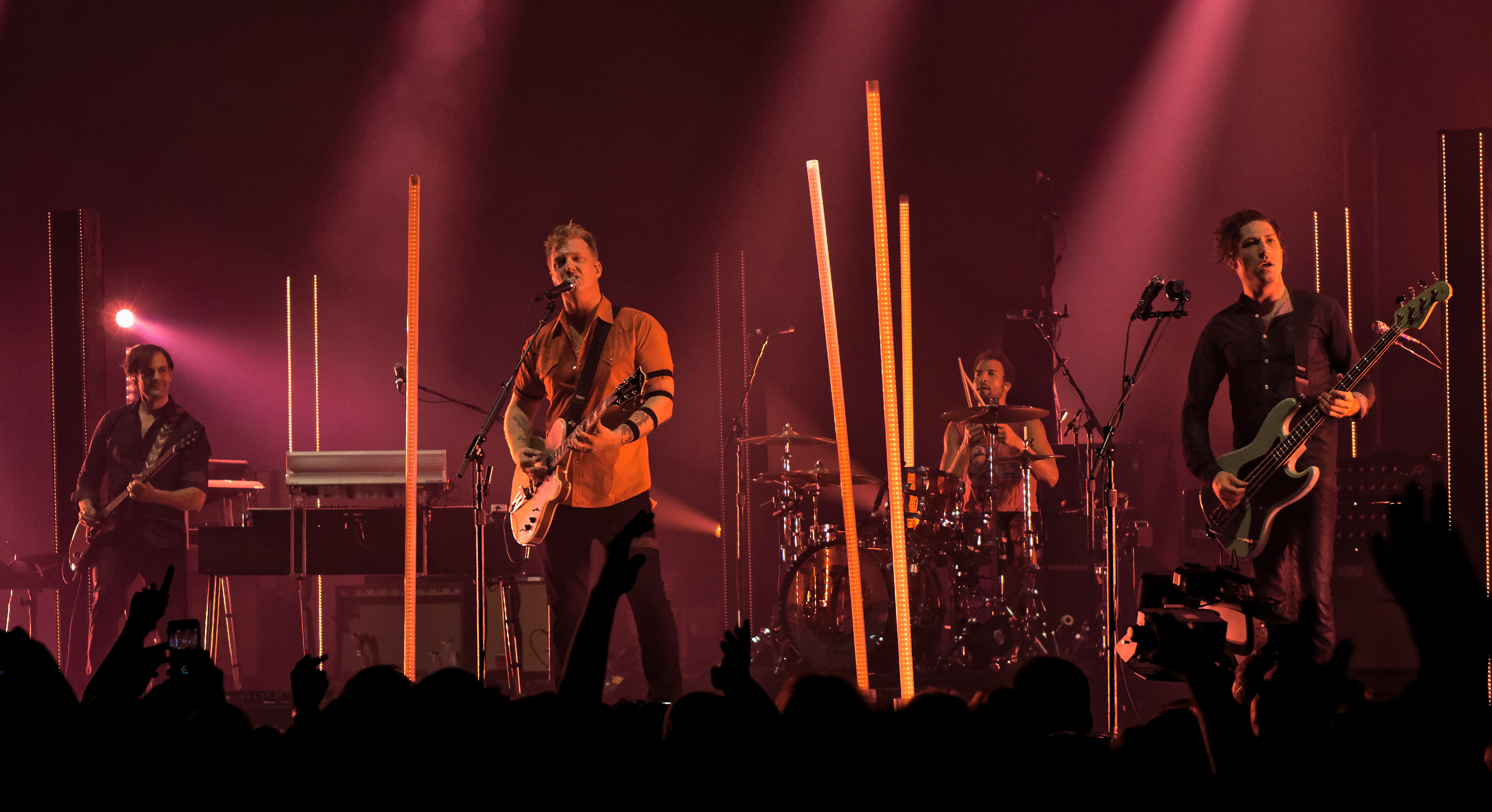
- Queens of the Stone Age in 2017. Left to right: Dean Fertita, Josh Homme, Jon Theodore, and Michael Shuman. Not pictured: Troy Van Leeuwen.

Background information
- Also known as: Gamma Ray (1996)
- Origin: Palm Desert, California, U.S.
- Genres: Alternative rock; stoner rock; desert rock; hard rock; alternative metal
- Works: Discography; songs
- Years active: 1996–present
- Labels: Man's Ruin; Loosegroove; Interscope; Matador
- Spinoffs: Them Crooked Vultures; The Desert Sessions; Eagles of Death Metal; Mondo Generator
- Spinoff of: Kyuss; Screaming Trees
- Members: Josh Homme; Troy Van Leeuwen; Michael Shuman; Dean Fertita; Jon Theodore
- Past members: Alfredo Hernández; Nick Oliveri; Dave Catching; Mark Lanegan; Gene Trautmann; Dave Grohl; Joey Castillo; Alain Johannes; Natasha Shneider
- Website: qotsa.com

Queens of the Stone Age (commonly abbreviated as QOTSA or QotSA) is an American rock band formed in Palm Desert, California, in 1996. The band was founded by vocalist and guitarist Josh Homme shortly before he returned to his native Palm Desert. Homme has been the only constant member throughout multiple line-up changes; since 2013, the line-up has consisted of Homme, Troy Van Leeuwen (guitar, lap steel, keyboards, percussion, backing vocals), Michael Shuman (bass, keyboards, backing vocals), Dean Fertita (keyboards, guitar, percussion, backing vocals), and Jon Theodore (drums, percussion).

Formed after the dissolution of Homme's previous band Kyuss, the band originated from the spread of the Palm Desert music scene. Its self-titled debut album (1998) was recorded with Homme singing and playing all instruments except drums, which were provided by former Kyuss member Alfredo Hernández. Bassist Nick Oliveri joined the band for its accompanying tour and soon became co-lead vocalist, as well as Dave Catching on keyboards, guitar and lap steel alongside Homme. The band's second studio album, Rated R (2000), featured Mark Lanegan as a guest vocalist and was the band's major label debut with Interscope Records. It was critically and commercially successful, and featured the breakout single "The Lost Art of Keeping a Secret". The band's third studio album, Songs for the Deaf (2002), featured Dave Grohl on drums alongside contributions from Alain Johannes and Natasha Shneider.

After Oliveri's and Lanegan's respective departures in 2004 and 2005, Homme once again became the band's sole lead vocalist; Van Leeuwen and drummer Joey Castillo collaborated with him on Lullabies to Paralyze (2005) and Era Vulgaris (2007). After several years of inactivity, the band signed to independent label Matador Records in 2013 and released a loose trilogy of albums over the next decade: ...Like Clockwork (2013), Villains (2017), and In Times New Roman... (2023). The trilogy brought further acclaim and commercial success, with ...Like Clockwork becoming the band's first album to top the Billboard 200 chart. The band's ninth studio album Perfecth was released on October 30, 2026.

The band has been nominated for 9 Grammy Awards: four for Best Hard Rock Performance, three for Best Rock Album, and one each for Best Rock Performance and Best Rock Song. The band also has a large pool of contributors and collaborators and is known for incorporating elements of blues, electronica, and krautrock into its riff-oriented and rhythmic hard rock, coupled with Homme's distinct falsetto vocals and unorthodox guitar scales.

== History ==
=== 1996–1999: Formation and debut album ===
After the breakup of his previous band Kyuss in 1995, Josh Homme moved to Seattle, where he briefly joined Screaming Trees as a touring guitarist. He later formed a new band called Gamma Ray, which released the eponymous Gamma Ray EP (1996), featuring "Born to Hula" and "If Only Everything" (which would later appear on their self-titled debut as "If Only"). The EP featured Van Conner of Screaming Trees, and drummer Victor Indrizzo.

Gamma Ray changed their name in 1997 after the German power metal band Gamma Ray threatened to sue. The name "Queens of the Stone Age" came from a nickname given to Kyuss by their producer Chris Goss. Homme said of the name: "Kings would be too macho. The Kings of the Stone Age wear armor and have axes and wrestle. The Queens of the Stone Age hang out with the Kings of the Stone Age's girlfriends when they wrestle ... Rock should be heavy enough for the boys and sweet enough for the girls. That way everyone's happy and it's more of a party. Kings of the Stone Age is too lopsided."

The first release under the Queens of the Stone Age name was the song "18 A.D.," released on Roadrunner Records' compilation album Burn One Up! Music for Stoners. It featured guitarist Dave Catching as well as the bassist Milo Beenhakker and drummer Eva Nahon of the Dutch stoner rock band Beaver, owing to connections Homme made while living in Amsterdam for a few months following Kyuss' breakup.

While the band's first official, fully-billed headlining performance is traditionally cited as 20 November 1997 at the OK Hotel in Seattle, Washington, their actual live public debut occurred two months prior on 6 September 1997. The band made a fully-billed, proto-lineup festival appearance at the legendary punk venue CBGB in New York City as part of the CMJ '97 Post Embryonic Bash, sharing a seven-band showcase bill with Monster Magnet, Unsane, Barkmarket, Fu Manchu, Zen Guerrilla, and Today Is The Day. The historic performance was commemorated in a limited 450-print silkscreen concert poster designed by underground graphic artist Frank Kozik, which notably featured the band's name spelt as a single word ("Queens of the Stoneage").

[Concert Poster]

In December that year, the band released a split EP, Kyuss/Queens of the Stone Age, which featured three tracks from the Gamma Ray sessions as well as three Kyuss tracks recorded in 1995 prior to their breakup. They later returned to OK Hotel 3 months after the first show with a lineup that featured Van Conner of Screaming Trees, and Jason Albertini of Duster.

Homme returned to Palm Desert, California, where he released Queens of the Stone Age's self-titled debut album in 1998 on Stone Gossard's and Regan Hagar's label Loosegroove Records, and on vinyl by Man's Ruin Records. Homme played guitar and bass on the album (the latter credited to Homme's alter-ego Carlo Von Sexron), Alfredo Hernández on drums, and several other contributions by Chris Goss and Hutch. Homme reportedly asked Screaming Trees vocalist Mark Lanegan to appear on the record, but he was unable due to other commitments.

Soon after the recording sessions were finished for the album, former Kyuss bassist Nick Oliveri joined the group, and touring commenced with a band consisting entirely of ex-Kyuss members. Catching, a former Kyuss guitar tech, joined shortly after. From this point forward, the band's line-up would change frequently; by the time their second album was being recorded, Hernández had left the group to play in other bands.

=== 2000–2001: Rated R ===
Released in 2000, Rated R featured a myriad of musicians familiar with Homme and Oliveri's work and "crew" of sorts: former Screaming Trees vocalist Mark Lanegan, drummers Nick Lucero and Gene Trautmann, guitarists Dave Catching, Brendon McNichol, and Chris Goss contributed, and even Judas Priest frontman Rob Halford, recording next door, stepped in for a guest spot on "Feel Good Hit of the Summer."

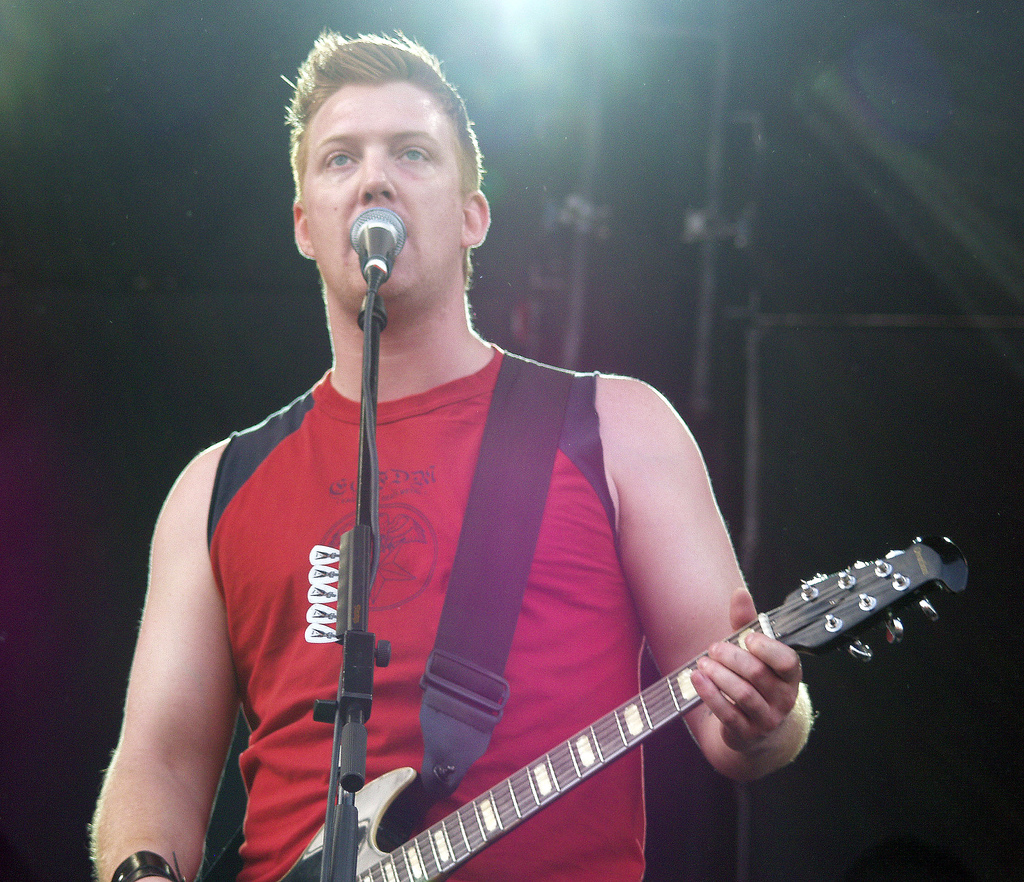
Josh Homme in August 2003

The album garnered positive reviews and received a lot more attention than their debut, despite the fact that the lyrics to "Feel Good Hit of the Summer" were deemed by mega-retailer Walmart to promote drug use, almost causing the record to get pulled from store shelves. The success of the record also earned the band notable opening slots with The Smashing Pumpkins, Foo Fighters, Hole, and a place at Ozzfest 2000. It was during this time that Homme stated:

There's a robotic element to our albums, like the repetition of riffs. We also wanted to do a record that had a lot of dynamic range. We wanted to set it up in this band so we could play anything. We don't want to get roped in by our own music. If anyone has a good song (regardless of style) we should be able to play it.

— Homme, interview with thefade.net

During the 2001 Rock in Rio show, bassist Nick Oliveri was arrested after performing on stage naked, with only his bass guitar covering his genitals. Oliveri apologized to officials, saying that he did not know it was a crime in Brazil.

Following his work on Rated R, Lanegan joined the band as a full-time member, a position he held until early 2005. Towards the end of the Rated R tour, the band's performance at the 2001 Rock am Ring festival in Germany was, according to Homme, "the worst show we've ever played and it was in front of 40,000 people." The band decided to tattoo themselves with the starting time of the performance, "Freitag 4:15." As Oliveri explained:

Me, Mark [Lanegan], Josh [Homme] and Hutch, our soundman, have the same tattoo, it's from Rock am Ring festival. The time we had to play was 4:15 in the afternoon and it was just a terrible show. It sucked, it was horrible. That's why I tattooed it on my ribs, where it would hurt, so I'd never forget.

— Oliveri, interview with Daredevil Magazine (2005)

=== 2001–2004: Songs for the Deaf, mainstream exposure and Oliveri's departure ===
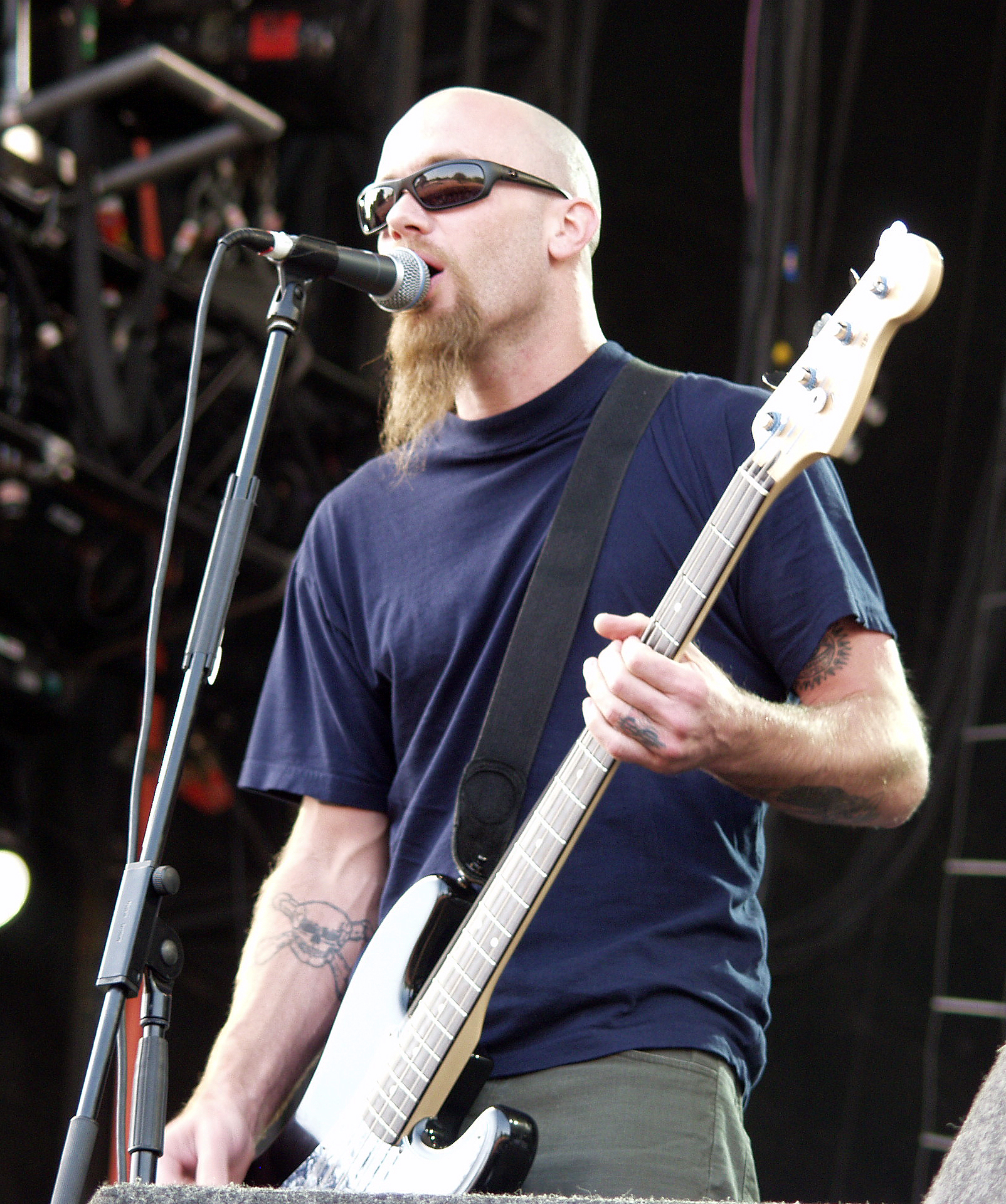
Nick Oliveri, bassist 1998–2004, performing with the band at the 2003 V Festival

Dave Grohl, Foo Fighters frontman and former Nirvana drummer, joined in late 2001 to record drums for the band's third album, Songs for the Deaf. It was released in August 2002 and again featured Lanegan. The final track on the album, "Mosquito Song", featured former A Perfect Circle member Paz Lenchantin on viola and piano along with Dean Ween on guitar. Another former A Perfect Circle member, guitarist Troy Van Leeuwen, joined the touring line-up following the album's release.

This record was supposed to sound bizarre—like lightning in a bottle. We also were extremely fucked up. It even sounds that way to me, like a crazy person. The radio interludes are supposed to be like the drive from L.A. to Joshua Tree, a drive that makes you feel like you're letting go—more David Lynch with every mile.

— Homme, interview with jr.com

Songs for the Deaf was a critical hit and was certified gold in 2003, with sales of over 900,000. The singles "No One Knows" and "Go with the Flow" became hits on radio and MTV, with the former just outside the Billboard Top 40. "No One Knows" and "Go with the Flow" were also featured on the first iterations of the popular video games Guitar Hero and Rock Band (respectively). Furthermore, the latter track was featured in the popular video game Fortnite as a song in Fortnite Festival. The song "You Think I Ain't Worth a Dollar, But I Feel Like a Millionaire" was featured in the video games, Tony Hawk's Underground and IndyCar Series. It was also used as the theme song in Naughty Dog's "Jak X: Combat Racing" in 2005 along with "Song for the Dead". The song was also used in the films xXx, Project X and Skincare.

The Songs for the Deaf tour culminated in a string of headline dates in Australia in January 2004. Grohl returned to his other projects and was replaced on the European leg of the tour by former Danzig drummer Joey Castillo, who joined the band full-time. After the tour, Homme fired Oliveri, as he was convinced that Oliveri had been physically abusive to his girlfriend: "A couple years ago, I spoke to Nick about a rumor I heard. I said, 'If I ever find out that this is true, I can't know you, man.'" Homme considered breaking up the band after firing Oliveri, but found a new determination to continue. Oliveri countered in the press that the band had been "poisoned by hunger for power" and that without him, they were "Queens Lite." He later softened his opinion and said: "My relationship with Josh is good. The new Queens record kicks ass." The two reportedly are still friends and as of October 2006, Oliveri was interested in rejoining the band. Oliveri later contributed to Queens of the Stone Age for the first time in nine years, contributing backing vocals to the band's sixth album, ...Like Clockwork.

=== 2004–2006: Lullabies to Paralyze ===
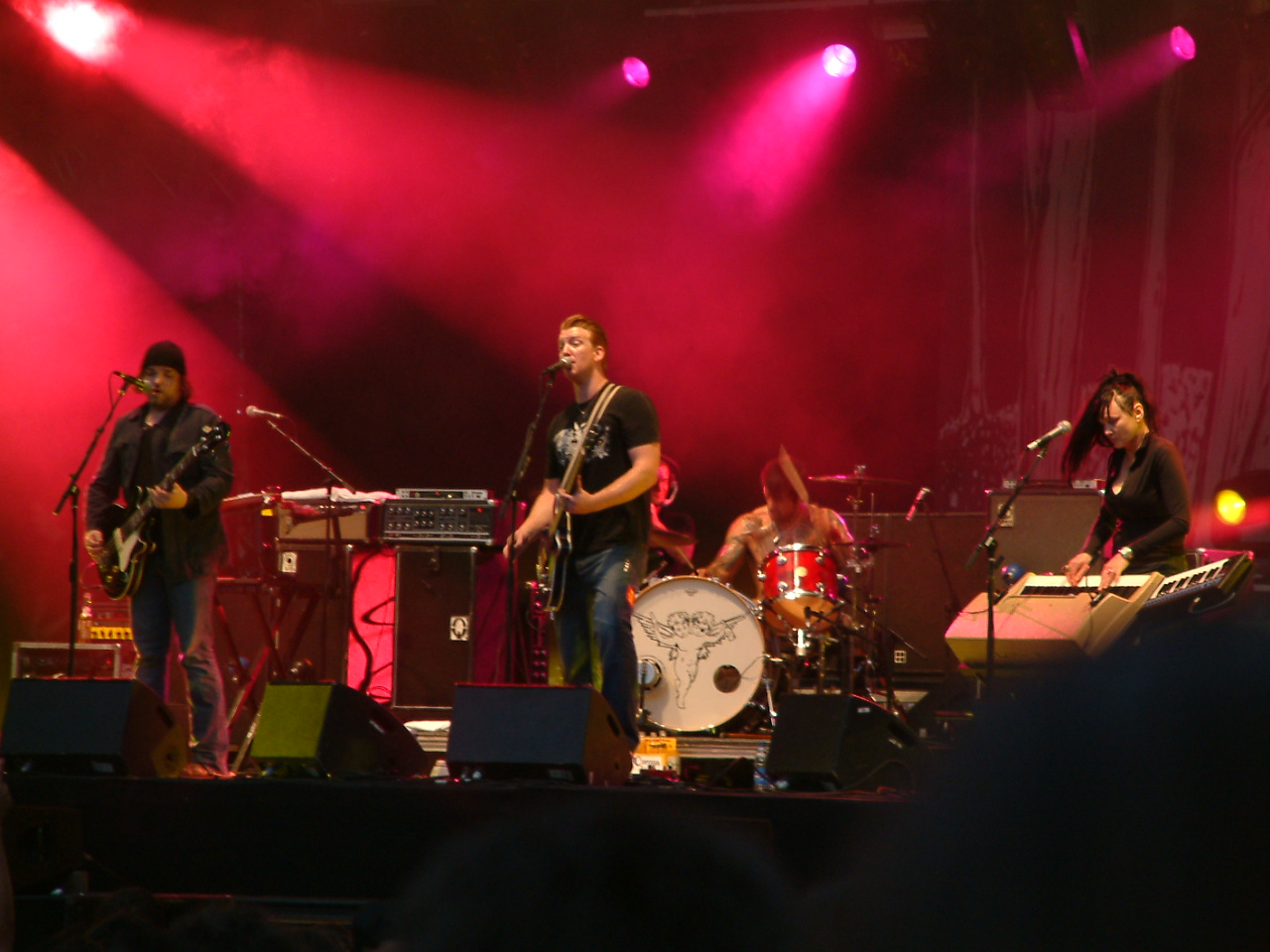
The band performing live, August 25, 2005, in Paris, France. Included in this performance are two bandmates from the band Eleven, Alain Johannes and the late Natasha Shneider, who joined the line-up for Lullabies to Paralyze and the supporting tour.

In late 2004, Homme, along with Eleven multi-instrumentalist Alain Johannes and remaining band members Van Leeuwen and Castillo recorded the Queens' fourth studio album, Lullabies to Paralyze, a title taken from a lyric in "Mosquito Song" from their previous album. The album featured guests including ZZ Top's Billy Gibbons. Despite Lanegan reportedly turning down an invitation to remain with the band, he recorded vocals on new tracks (notably the solo vocalist on the opening track "This Lullaby") and appeared on the supporting tour as scheduling and his health permitted.

Lullabies to Paralyze was leaked onto the internet in February 2005 and was aired by Triple J radio in Australia on March 3, 2005, as an unsubstantiated 'World Premiere'. It was then officially released on Tuesday, March 22, 2005, in the US, debuting in the number 5 slot on the Billboard Music Chart, the greatest debut of any Queens record until ...Like Clockwork debuted at number 1 in June 2013.

On May 14, 2005, the group was the musical guest on Saturday Night Live, hosted by Will Ferrell. One of Ferrell's popular Saturday Night Live characters, fictional Blue Öyster Cult cowbellist Gene Frenkle, made a re-appearance on the show, playing with the Queens on their first song of the night, "Little Sister." Frenkle played the song's wood block part using a cowbell along with the band.

On November 22, 2005, Queens of the Stone Age released a live album/DVD set, Over the Years and Through the Woods, featuring a live concert filmed in London, England, and bonus features that included rare videos of songs from 1998 to 2005. In 2005, the group supported Nine Inch Nails on their North American tour of With Teeth along with Autolux (for the first half of the tour) and Death from Above 1979 (for the second). NIN's guitarist Aaron North appeared as an onstage guest with the Queens for the songs "Born to Hula," "Regular John," "Avon," "Monsters in the Parasol" and "Long, Slow Goodbye" at the Wiltern LG in Los Angeles on December 19 and 20, 2005.

Another onstage guest for the December 20 performance was Homme's former Kyuss bandmate John Garcia, the first time that Homme and Garcia had played together since 1997. As a special encore they performed three Kyuss songs: "Thumb," "Hurricane" and "Supa Scoopa and Mighty Scoop." Homme stated that the band's lowest point was during the Lullabies era, but that the record "took the lead jacket off" the band following the firing of Oliveri in 2004.

=== 2007–2008: Era Vulgaris and death of Shneider ===
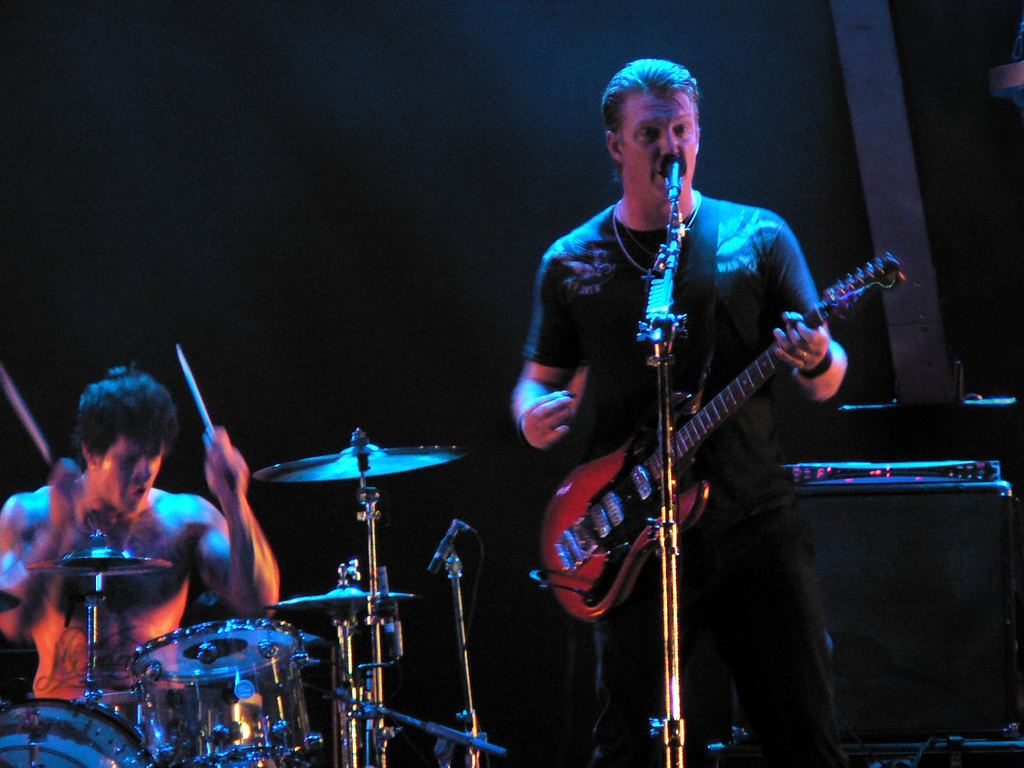
Joey Castillo and Josh Homme when the band performed at the Southside Festival in Germany, June 2007

On Valentine's Day 2007, the band's official website announced the new album would be titled Era Vulgaris, and would be released in June. Later in February, teaser videos surfaced showing Homme, Castillo, Van Leeuwen and Johannes in studio. Several sites reported that the album would include many guest vocalists, including Trent Reznor from Nine Inch Nails, Julian Casablancas from The Strokes, Mark Lanegan, Billy Gibbons of ZZ Top, and deceased humorist Erma Bombeck. Death from Above 1979 bassist Jesse F. Keeler had been expected to play bass on the studio recording of the album, but not to tour; however, due to schedule conflicts, he stated he would not be appearing on the album.

Era Vulgaris was completed in early April 2007 and released June 12, 2007, in the US. The tracks "Sick, Sick, Sick" and "3's & 7's" were released as singles in early June. Homme has described the record as "dark, hard, and electrical, sort of like a construction worker." When asked about the vocals on the record, specifically the different style of singing that Homme used, he replied:

I wanted to try some shit that was downright embarrassing at first. This record is a grower, not about what isn't there, but what is.

— Josh Homme, interview with jr.com, 2007

Bassist Michael Shuman (Wires on Fire, Jubilee, and Mini Mansions) and keyboardist Dean Fertita (The Waxwings, The Dead Weather) took over touring duties from Alain Johannes and Natasha Shneider, respectively. In July 2007, Van Leeuwen stated the band had written new material "still in its infancy", which Homme later suggested might be released as an EP. Following a subsequent interview with Homme, The Globe and Mail reported that the EP "could contain as many as 10 B-sides recorded during the Era Vulgaris sessions." It was later reported that the EP would not be released due to the record label's unwillingness to put out another QOTSA release at that time.

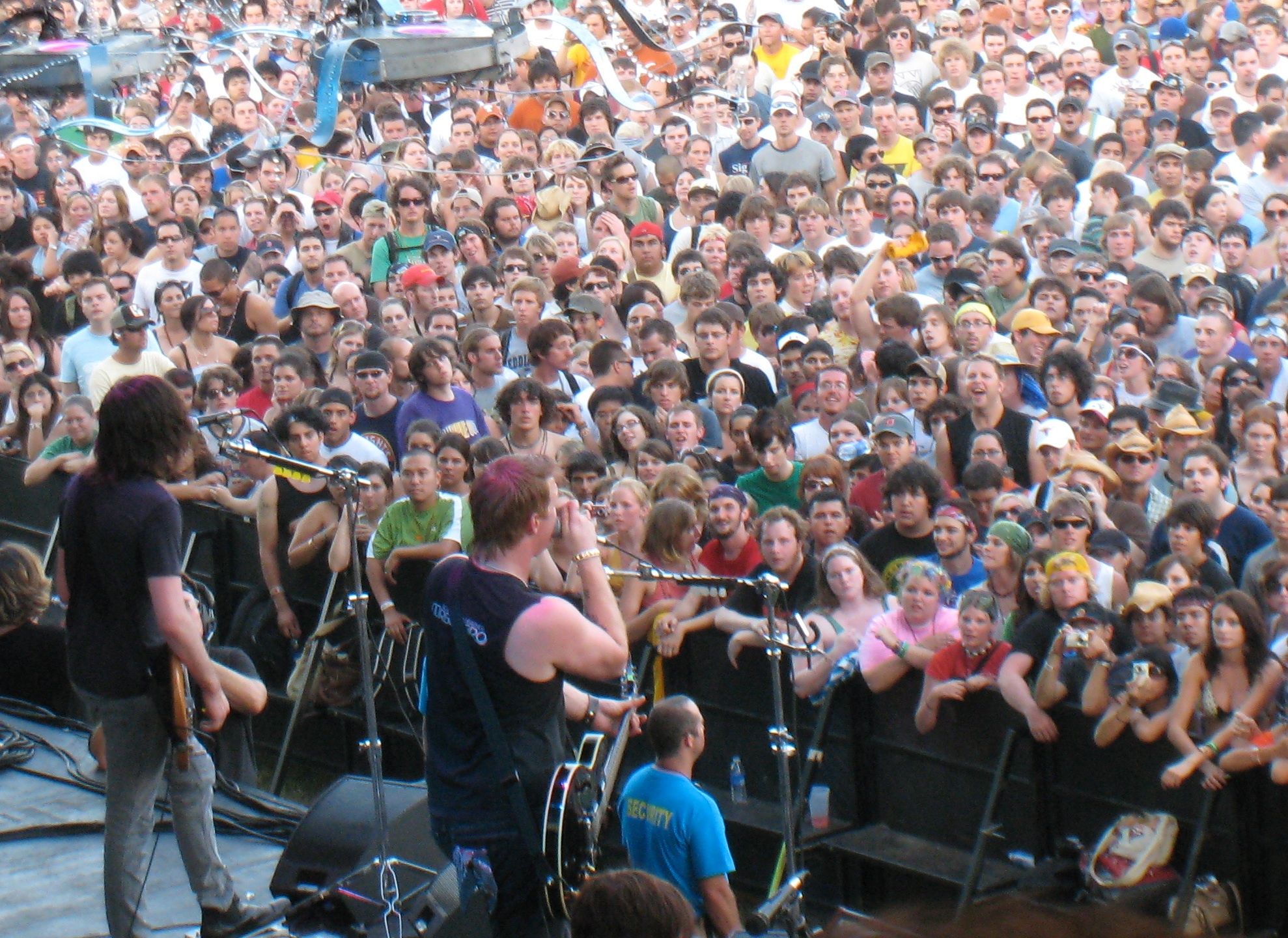
Queens of the Stone Age performing at the Austin City Limits Music Festival in Zilker Park, September 14, 2007

The band began a North American Tour in 2007, which they named the "Duluth Tour" because they were going to many small towns and cities they had never played before, such as Duluth, Minnesota. The tour was extended to other areas, such as the United Kingdom, where the band played more shows than on any of their previous UK tours. The band toured in Australia in late March to early April 2008, on the V festival tour, including a string of side shows. Throughout the beginning of May 2008, the band completed the Canadian leg of its touring.

In November 2007, Queens of the Stone Age performed a semi-acoustic set in an underground salt mine in Germany, performing a selection of hits, rarities, covers and an unreleased song named "Cathedral City." A DVD of the concert was planned but aside from a trailer promoting the DVD and a number of photographs, no footage of the concert has been released.

On July 2, 2008, Queens of the Stone Age's former keyboardist Natasha Shneider died of lung cancer at the age of 52. The news broke with a message posted on the MySpace page of the band Sweethead, of which Natasha's close friend and former bandmate Troy Van Leeuwen is a member. The band's homepage was updated with a memorial message by Homme replacing the normal front page. The band performed a concert in celebration of Natasha Shneider's life at the Henry Fonda Theatre in Los Angeles on August 16, 2008. They were joined on stage by Shneider's husband Alain Johannes, Tenacious D, Matt Cameron, Brody Dalle, Jesse Hughes, Chris Goss, and PJ Harvey, playing a variety of QOTSA and non-QOTSA songs, including covers of songs from bands such as Cream and The Doors. Tenacious D and Harvey also performed acoustic sets at the show. Proceeds from the concert went to defray the costs associated with Shneider's treatment.

On August 22 and 23, 2008, Queens of the Stone Age performed the last shows of their Era Vulgaris tour at the Reading and Leeds Festivals in the UK, and Josh Homme announced in an interview with the BBC and during the show that he would be returning to the studio to work on the next album.

=== 2009–2011: Homme's health issues, debut re-release and tour ===
During 2009 and 2010, band members worked on side projects during the down time. Troy Van Leeuwen started up a new band, Sweethead. Joey Castillo played for Eagles of Death Metal on their Heart On tour. Bassist Michael Shuman continued his work as drummer and vocalist with Mini Mansions, while Dean Fertita became the guitarist/keyboardist for Jack White's newest group, The Dead Weather. Josh Homme formed supergroup Them Crooked Vultures with Dave Grohl and John Paul Jones. After Them Crooked Vultures finished touring in June, the band toured and released a two-CD deluxe edition of Rated R on August 3, 2010. This edition featured the original CD along with six B-sides and live recordings from the band's Reading performance in 2000.

In 2010, Homme suffered from complications during a botched knee surgery, during which his heart stopped for a short time due to asphyxiation; doctors had to use a defibrillator to revive him. Following this, he was bedridden for four months and plunged into a deep depression, during which he considered giving up his music career altogether. He elaborated on this experience further in an interview on Marc Maron's WTF podcast, explaining that he had contracted a methicillin-resistant Staphylococcus aureus (MRSA) infection that his immune system could not fight due to stress. Homme has since said that the experience contributed greatly to the writing and recording of ...Like Clockwork.

After Homme recovered, Queens of the Stone Age released a remastered version of their self-titled debut album in early 2011, and performed the album in its entirety in a promotional tour. The band performed on Conan on April 14, and later played at the Australian music festival Soundwave. Throughout the summer of 2011, the band appeared at various European festivals, including the Glastonbury Festival, in Somerset, UK. They also played at Pearl Jam's 20th Anniversary Festival at Alpine Valley in East Troy, Wisconsin on September 3 and 4, 2011, which would be their last with drummer Joey Castillo.

=== 2011–2024: Boneface trilogy ===
==== 2011–2014: ...Like Clockwork ====
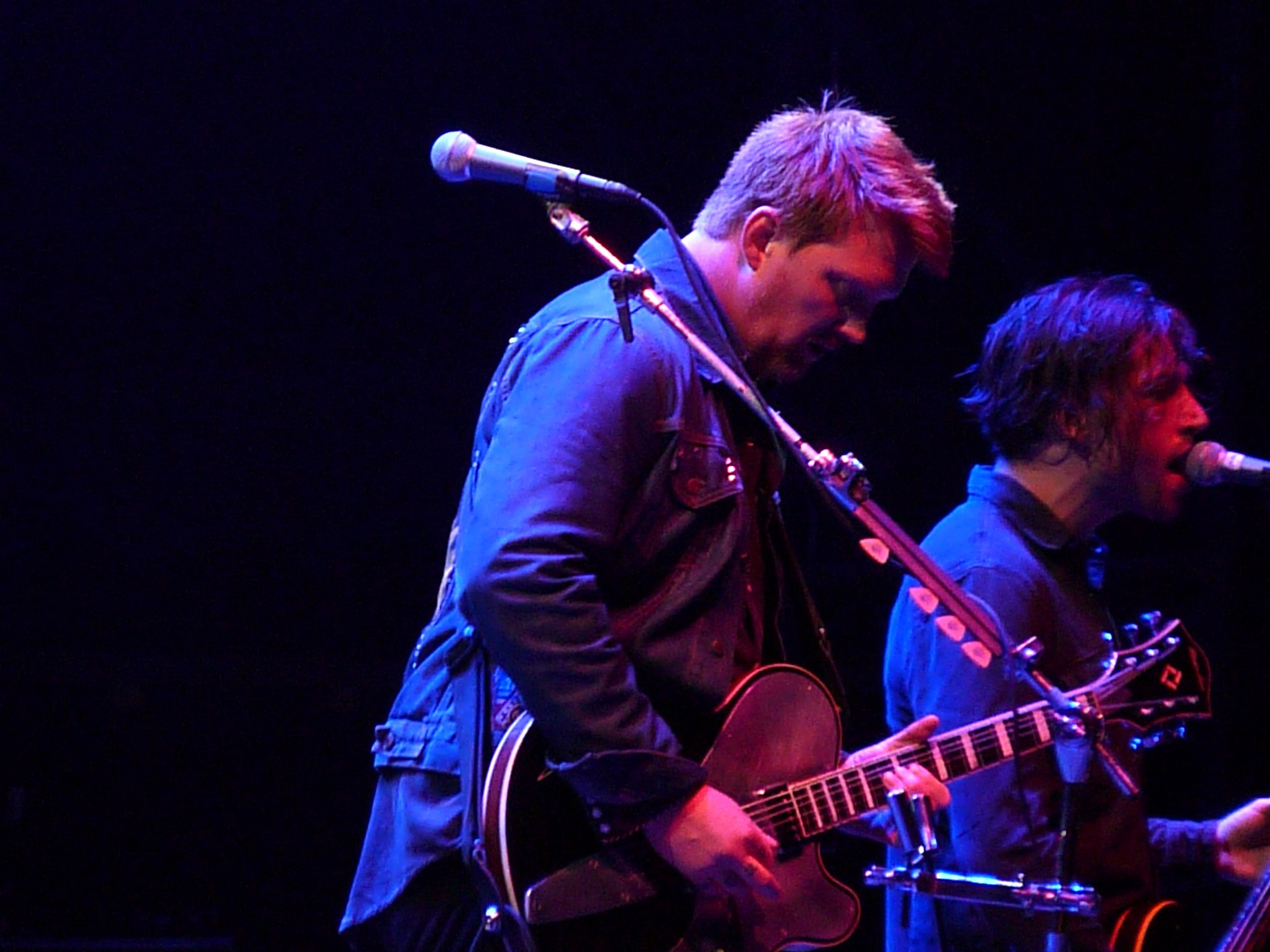
Josh Homme and Michael Shuman performing in 2011

Plans to record a follow-up to Era Vulgaris had been mentioned since 2008, but recording would not begin until August 2012. In March 2011, Homme stated, "Doing the rehearsals for the first record is really defining the new one. It's been turning the new record into something else. What we were doing was bluesy, and now it's turned into this trancey, broken thing. The robots are coming home!" According to Homme, the album would be finished by the end of 2012. He explained to BBC Radio 1, "We're going to take our one last break that we would get for a month, come back and do Glastonbury, then immediately jump in the studio. Our record will be done by the end of the year. We have enough songs."

In November 2011, Alain Johannes stated in regard to his studio work with the band: "We had a late night with Queens of the Stone Age again. [...] Just putting in days, super top secret, but it's going to be amazing. I'm really excited about it. [...] Once we start the process, it goes to completion. So I can't say exactly when, but it's a really good start."

In September 2012, it was revealed that Homme and producer Dave Sardy co-wrote and recorded a song entitled "Nobody To Love," which is featured during the end credits of the film End of Watch.

In November 2012, Homme informed BBC's Zane Lowe that Joey Castillo had left the band and that drums on the new album would be performed by Dave Grohl, who also performed on Songs for the Deaf. Homme also confirmed with Lowe that the album would be released prior to their performance at the Download Festival in June 2013. In addition to Grohl, other former members contributing to the album include former bassists Nick Oliveri and Johannes, and vocalist Mark Lanegan.

A number of collaborations from different musicians were announced for ...Like Clockwork, including Nine Inch Nails frontman Trent Reznor, Scissor Sisters frontman Jake Shears, Brody Dalle, and Elton John.

In early 2013, Homme and fellow Queens contributors including Alain Johannes and Chris Goss recorded for the soundtrack of Dave Grohl's Sound City: Real to Reel. Goss, Johannes and Homme were on three tracks each. Homme's notably included a collaboration with Grohl and Trent Reznor called Mantra, and he was also featured in the film in an interview segment. Goss and Johannes were both featured members in the Sound City Players, playing Masters of Reality, Eleven, and Desert Sessions songs, as well as their penned tunes from the soundtrack. Former Kyuss bassist Scott Reeder also contributed to the soundtrack.

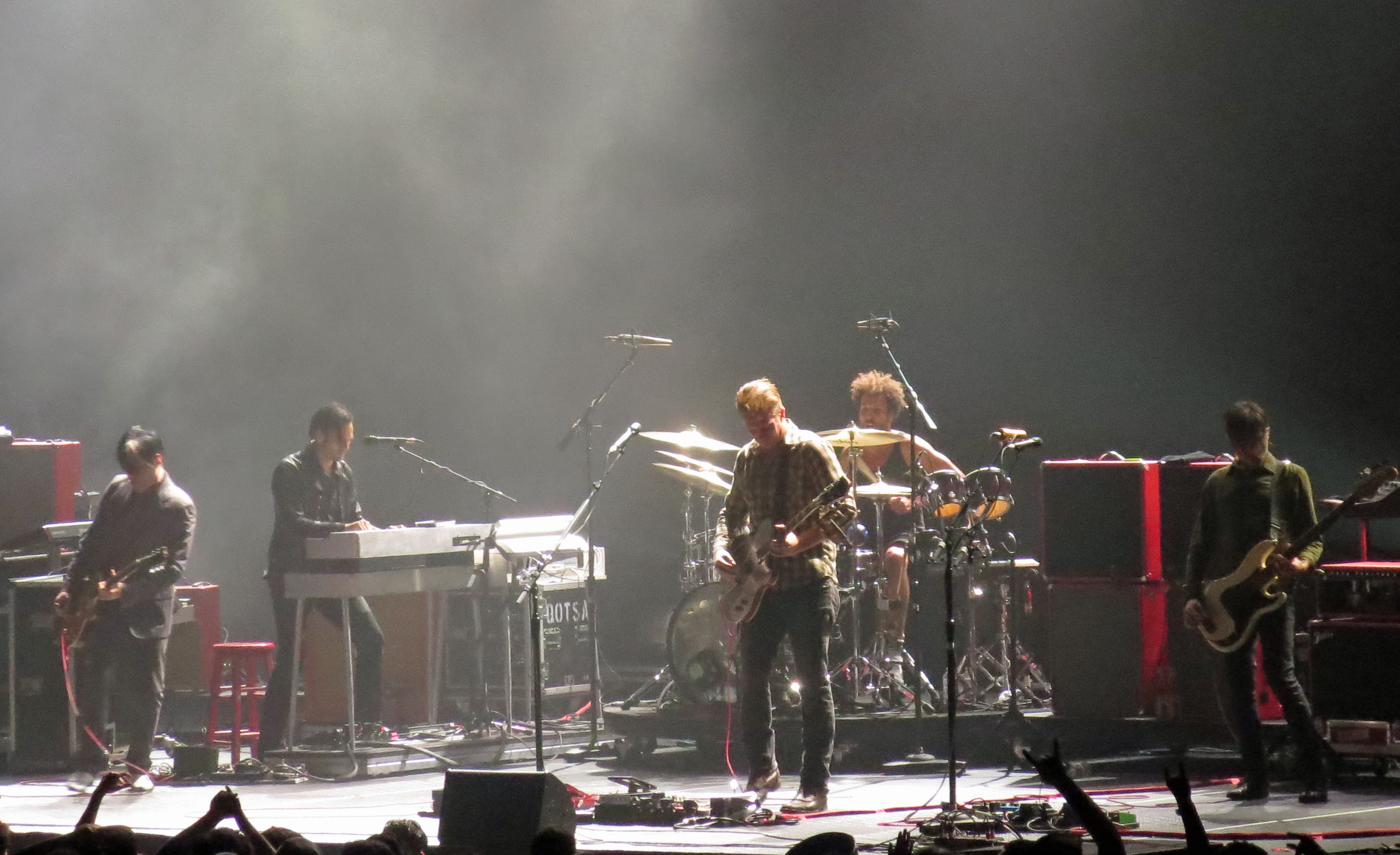
Queens of the Stone Age at the Allstate Arena, December 11, 2013

In March 2013, Queens of the Stone Age announced that the new album, entitled ...Like Clockwork, would be released in June 2013 on Matador Records. A press release, issued by Matador at 9:00am EST on March 26, 2013, revealed further details of the album, including further guest appearances: Alex Turner of Arctic Monkeys and UNKLE's James Lavelle. In addition to Grohl's contribution, the record also features performances by former drummer Castillo, as well as tracks by new drummer Jon Theodore (ex-The Mars Volta, One Day as a Lion). Queens of the Stone Age premiered a new song, "My God Is The Sun", at Lollapalooza Brasil on March 30, 2013, a performance in which Theodore made his live debut. The studio version of the song premiered on Lowe's BBC Radio 1 program on April 8, 2013.

...Like Clockwork was released on June 3, 2013, on Matador Records in the UK and on June 4 in the United States. Self-produced by the band, it is the first Queens of the Stone Age album to feature full contributions from bassist Michael Shuman and keyboardist and guitarist Dean Fertita. The album debuted in the number one position in the US and is the first QOTSA album to achieve this ranking.

Following a performance by QOTSA at the Jay Z-owned Made In America Festival in the summer of 2013, Homme made comments about the rap star during a radio interview with CBC Radio 2's Strombo Show. Homme explained that his band was frisked by the event's security team prior to the performance and referred to Jay Z's personal interaction with the band as a marketing stunt. Homme stated:

He has his security frisking the bands on the way in. I just told them if you open up my bag I'm not playing so I guess it's up to you whether we are playing or not ... The idea they frisked all my guys, means you're in some different place, no-one has ever done that [to me] ... He also gave us some champagne and wanted us to take a photo with it. And I thought, "That's not a gift, that is a marketing tool." So I destroyed it. Because I thought it was rude overall. And you shouldn't frisk my guys, you should fuck off.

The ...Like Clockwork tour culminated with a Halloween party at The Forum in Los Angeles, featuring guests such as The Kills, JD McPherson and Nick Oliveri's band Uncontrollable. Oliveri joined Queens of the Stone Age during the encore set, including songs such as "Auto Pilot" and "Quick and to the Pointless", which had not been performed in a decade.

==== 2015–2018: Villains ====
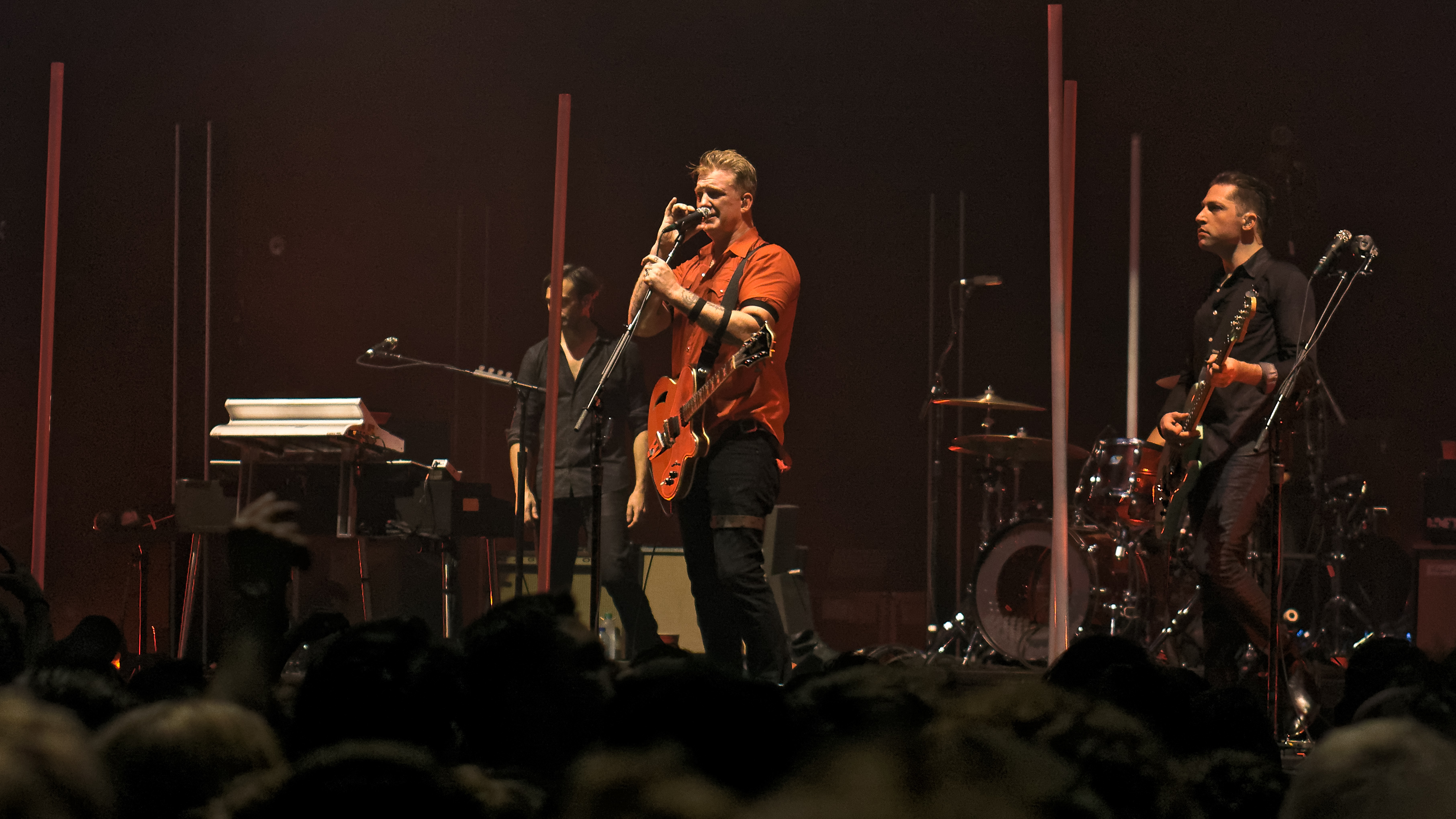
The band performing at Wembley in November 2017

The band performed with Trent Reznor, Lindsey Buckingham and Dave Grohl at the 56th Annual Grammy Awards. The band went on a joint headline tour of Australia with Nine Inch Nails in 2014.

In January 2014, Homme told Rolling Stone magazine the band would start recording a new album when they finished their tour for ...Like Clockwork. In June 2014, Homme performed a solo acoustic show at James Lavelle's Meltdown festival, featuring guest performances from Troy Van Leeuwen and Mark Lanegan. During this gig, Homme played a new song called "Villains of Circumstance," which was performed again at another acoustic set in 2016. The band indicated in February 2015, when it was announced they are to play Rock in Rio 2015 in Rio de Janeiro in September, that they were about to record a new album. Despite this, in March 2016, Michael Shuman revealed that the band were on a break.

During this period, the members of the band worked on various other projects. Josh Homme and Dean Fertita contributed to Iggy Pop's 2016 album Post Pop Depression and subsequent tour, while Troy van Leeuwen joined the rock supergroup Gone Is Gone with plans to release an EP and a studio album. In May 2016, Van Leeuwen announced plans to record Queens of the Stone Age's seventh studio album "sometime this year."

In January 2017, Troy Sanders from Mastodon and Gone Is Gone said Queens of the Stone Age will release a new album later in the year. Following this, the band posted several photos on social media featuring their studio and announced that they would be performing at the Fuji Rock Festival in July, their first performance in Japan since 2003. The band updated their social media accounts with a new logo and the words "Coming Twentyfive" on April 6, 2017, and announced a tour of Australia and New Zealand to begin in July.

On June 14, 2017, Queens of the Stone Age announced their new album Villains, released on August 25, 2017. The teaser trailer took the form of a comedy skit featuring the band performing a polygraph test with Liam Lynch along with an appearance of the album's producer Mark Ronson, and featured a snippet of the song "Feet Don't Fail Me." The first single, "The Way You Used to Do," was released the following day along with the announcement of a world tour. The second advance single from the album, "The Evil Has Landed," was released August 10, 2017.

On October 24, 2017, as part of the Villains tour, the band headlined Madison Square Garden for the first time, having opened for Nine Inch Nails there in 2005, and for Red Hot Chili Peppers in 2003. Homme said he was "stoked". Three sets of free tickets to this show were hidden at three stations along the Q line of the New York City Subway.

On December 9, 2017, while on stage during the KROQ Acoustic Christmas concert in Inglewood, California, Homme kicked a photographer's camera into her face, resulting in injuries for which she later received medical treatment. Homme, who was under the influence of alcohol at the time, later apologized through a video on the band's Instagram page, saying, "I hope you're okay, and I'm truly sorry. And I understand you have to do whatever you have to do. I just want you to know that I'm sorry. Goodnight, godspeed."

==== 2019–2024: In Times New Roman... ====
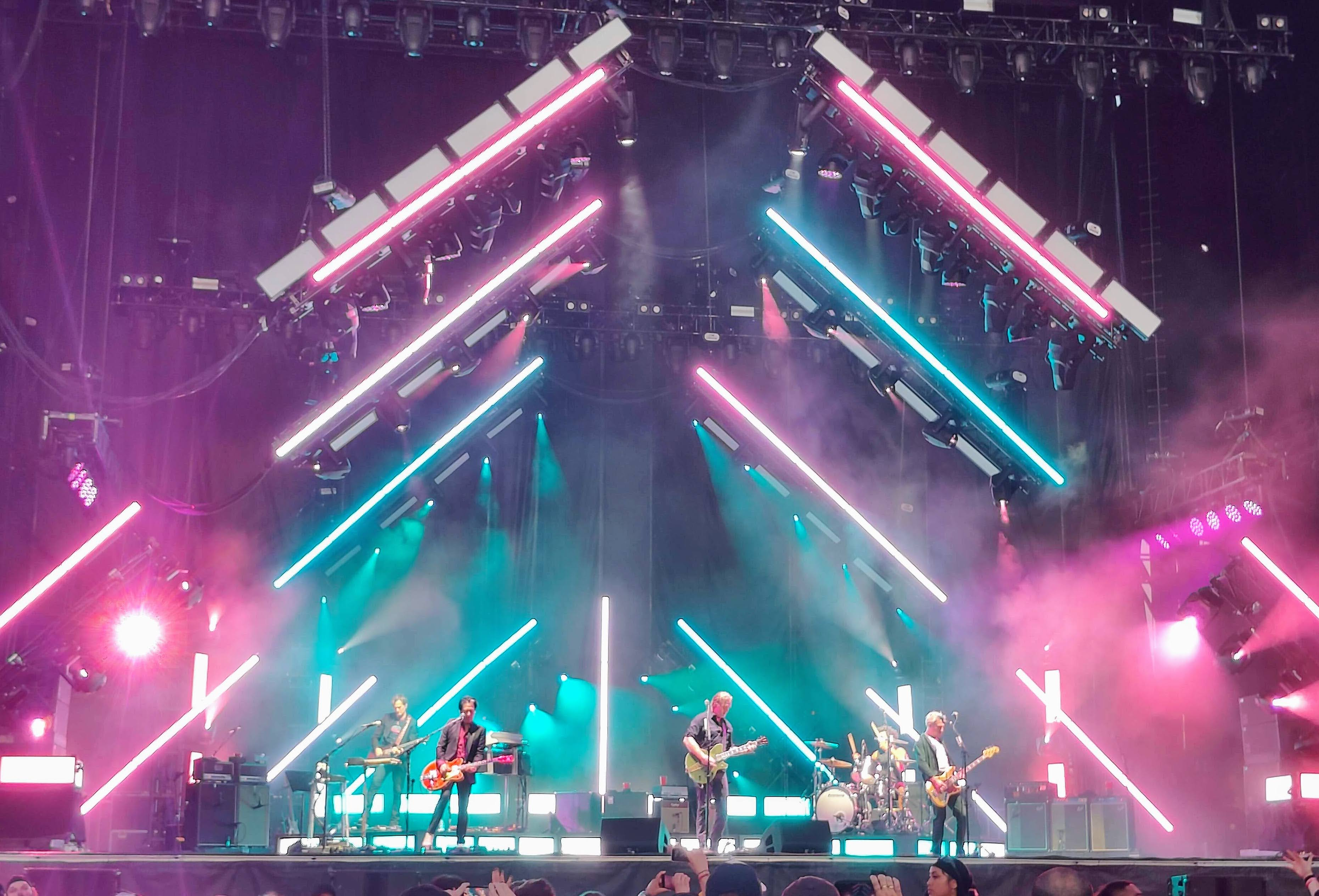
Queens of the Stone Age playing at Aftershock Festival 2023.

In an interview with eonmusic in June 2019, Billy Gibbons announced that he had contributed to a new Queens of the Stone Age album that was set to be further announced by Homme. Gibbons also confirmed that Dave Grohl was involved in the recording sessions. Grohl denied the rumors, however, saying that he and Homme had only spent time together "riding motorcycles and eating waffles."

In early May 2023, rumors began to surface of the album when a product listing appeared on the band's website titled In Times New Roman..., including an album cover and tracklist. The listing was initially removed. On May 11, the album's first single "Emotion Sickness" was released, along with an official announcement of the album. On May 31, the album's second single "Carnavoyeur" was released. On June 14, the third and final single "Paper Machete" was released, immediately followed by the release of the album on June 16. Neither Gibbons nor Grohl ended up appearing on the album; however, it did feature guest vocals from Arctic Monkeys drummer Matt Helders and strings from The Section Quartet.

In early June, Queens of the Stone Age announced an extensive North American tour called "The End Is Nero Tour", immediately followed by a full European leg with dates until late November 2023. This was followed a 2024 tour that included Australia, New Zealand and North America, and Europe. On July 9, the band cancelled several European shows that month so Homme could have emergency surgery, and they cancelled more later that month. Jack White filled in their slot for some festivals. On August 23, the remainder of the band's 2024 shows were cancelled or postponed to 2025 due to Homme needing "essential medical care for the remainder of the year".

=== 2024–present: Alive in the Catacombs and Perfecth ===
On May 13, 2025, the band announced a concert film entitled Alive in the Catacombs for digital release on June 5. The live performance was recorded in July 2024 in the Paris Catacombs, and features a three-piece string section joining the band performing stripped-down acoustic renditions of their songs. This performance marks them as the first band to gain the city's permission to play within the catacombs. The band also announced a brief tour of historic North American theaters for The Catacombs Tour featuring new arrangements of songs in the style of the live album.

After the release of In Times New Roman..., Homme was interviewed, saying he thought there was "too much time in between [Villains] and this one" and that he was going to "roll up [his] sleeves and jump right into this." At the end of Alive in the Catacombs, Homme can be heard singing an unreleased song, listed as "Insignificant Other" in the credits. At the debut performance of the Catacombs Tour, they performed a then unreleased song "Easy Street".

On the 24th of April, 2026, former bassist Nick Oliveri performed with the band for the first time in 12 years, singing Autopilot.

The band extended the Catacombs Tour with Libby Grace as support into the spring of 2026. In the summer they toured with System of a Down and Acid Bath in Europe, and with Foo Fighters and Mannequin Pussy in North America.

On July 14, 2026, the band released the single and music video "Easy Street" featuring backing vocals from Nikki Lane while on their European tour with System of a Down. In early August, they established a complaint hotline for "gripes and grievances" where fans could call and leave a message. On August 15, 2026, they released a teaser trailer announcing their ninth studio album Perfecth for release on September 30, 2026. The trailer however ends with that date crossed out, and the release date was ambiguous. The real release date was eventually revealed to be October 30 along with the release of the album's second single "Insignificant Other".

== Musical style ==
Throughout its career, the band has been described as alternative rock, stoner rock, alternative metal, and hard rock. Homme has called the band's self-titled debut album driving music, angular and recorded dry; its songs feature solid, repetitive riffs. Rolling Stone magazine also noted a "connection between American meat-and-potatoes macho rock of the early 1970s, like Blue Cheer and Grand Funk Railroad, and the precision-timing drones in German rock of the same period." The band's next album, Rated R, has a wider variety of instruments, several recording guests, and lead vocals shared by Homme, Oliveri and Lanegan. Homme has said, "Our first record announced our sound. This one added that we're different and weird." The band continued to experiment on its third album, Songs for the Deaf, which also featured a lineup of three lead vocalists, many guest appearances, and wide range of instrumentation, including horn and string sections. Homme has called Lullabies to Paralyze a "dark" album, which includes imagery inspired by The Brothers Grimm folk and fairy tales. In 2005, Homme said, "Where the poetry seems to be is when you start in the dark and reach for the light—that's what makes it not depressing to me". The album changed gears from the band's previous distinct "driving" sound, in large part due to Oliveri's departure. The band almost exclusively used semi-hollow body guitars on the record. With Era Vulgaris the band continued to develop its signature sound with more dance-oriented elements and electronic influences, while Homme became the only lead vocalist and used more distinct vocal melodies.

Homme has on numerous occasions described the band's music as "rock versions of electronic music", saying he takes inspiration from the repetitive nature of electronic trance music along with various forms of dance music, hip-hop, trip hop and Krautrock. He called this heavy rock style mixed with the structure of electronic music "robot rock" in an interview with KUNO-TV at the 2001 Roskilde Festival.

Homme has described aspects of his distinctive guitar playing style. He demonstrated the "Josh Homme scale", which he said was the result of years playing and altering the blues scale. The scale has the intervals 1, ♭3, 3, ♭5, 5, 6, ♭7. His scale is the half whole scale with the second degree (♭2) omitted. In the same interview, Homme referenced some earlier influences on his playing, citing both polka guitar styles and the techniques of Jimi Hendrix.

== Members ==
Current

- Josh Homme – lead vocals, guitar, keyboards (1996–present), bass (1996–1998, 2004–2007)
- Troy Van Leeuwen – guitar, lap steel, keyboards, percussion, backing vocals (2002–present), bass (2004–2007)
- Michael Shuman – bass, keyboards, backing vocals (2007–present)
- Dean Fertita – keyboards, guitar, percussion, backing vocals (2007–present)
- Jon Theodore – drums, percussion, sampler (2013–present)

Touring musicians

- Davey Latter – percussion (2025-present)

Former

- Alfredo Hernández – drums, percussion (1998–1999)
- Nick Oliveri – bass, co-lead and backing vocals (1998–2004)
- Dave Catching – guitar, keyboards, lap steel, backing vocals (1998–2000)
- Gene Trautmann – drums, percussion (1999–2001)
- Mark Lanegan – co-lead and backing vocals (2000–2005; died 2022), keyboards (2005)
- Dave Grohl – drums, percussion (2001–2002; session musician 2013)
- Joey Castillo – drums, percussion (2002–2012)
- Alain Johannes – bass, guitar, keyboards, backing vocals (2005–2007)
- Natasha Shneider – keyboards, backing vocals (2005–2006; died 2008)

Former touring musicians

- Matt Cameron – drums (1997, 2008)
- John McBain – guitar (1997)
- Mike Johnson – bass, backing vocals (1997-1998)
- Pete Stahl – co-lead and backing vocals (1998–1999)
- Mario Lalli – guitar, keyboards, lap steel, co-lead and backing vocals (1999)
- Brendon McNichol – guitar, keyboards, lap steel (2000–2002)
- Dan Druff – bass, guitar, backing vocals (2004–2005)
- Eric Gorfain - conductor and orchestrator (2025–2026)

== Discography ==
Studio albums

- Queens of the Stone Age (1998)
- Rated R (2000)
- Songs for the Deaf (2002)
- Lullabies to Paralyze (2005)
- Era Vulgaris (2007)
- ...Like Clockwork (2013)
- Villains (2017)
- In Times New Roman... (2023)
- Perfecth (2026)

== Tours ==
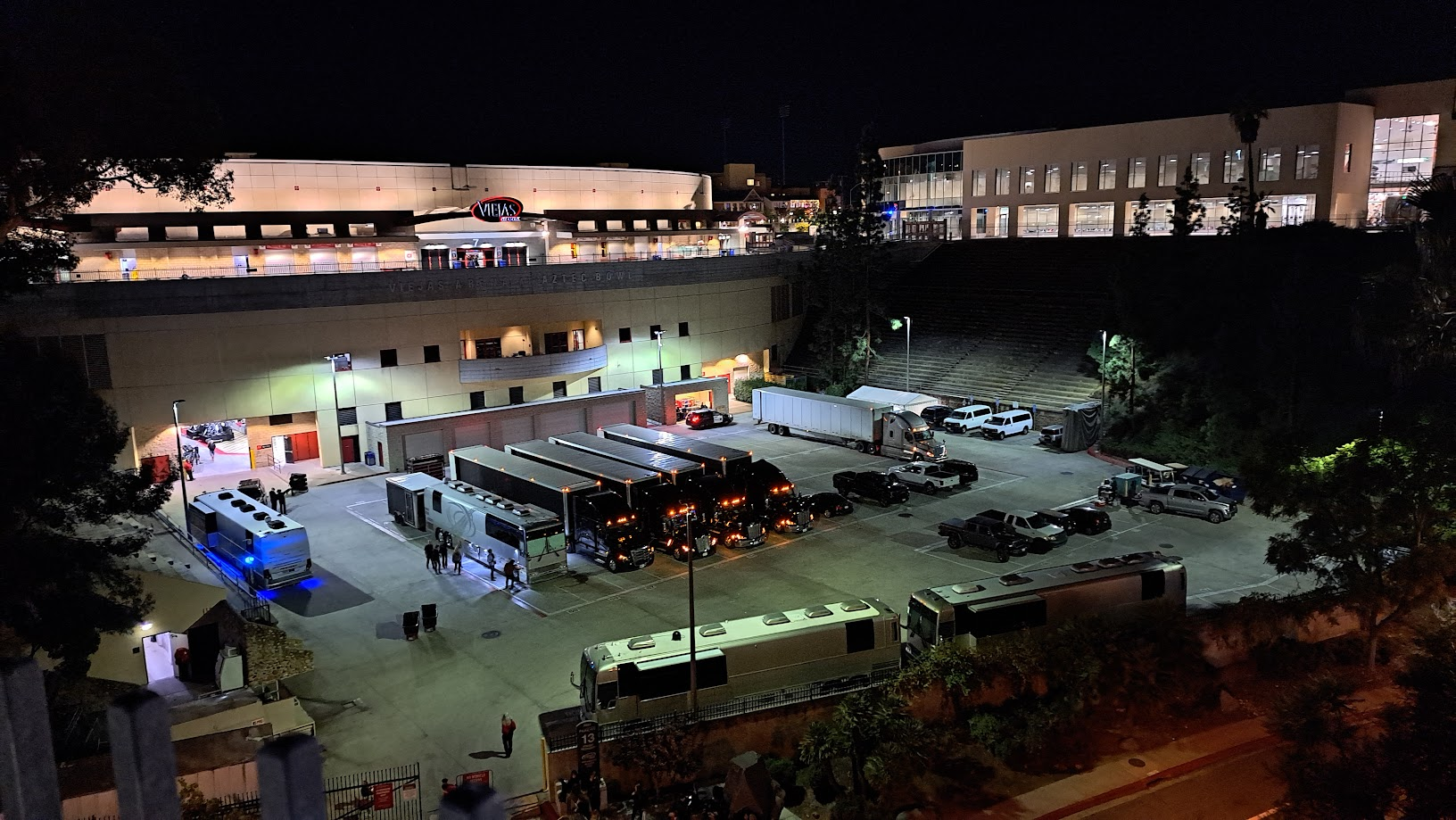
- Queens of the Stone Age Tour Buses at Viejas Arena - December 15, 2023
  Queens of the Stone Age Tour (1998–1999)
- Rated R Tour (2000–2001)
- Songs for the Deaf Tour (2002–2004)
- Lullabies to Paralyze Tour (2005–2006)
- Era Vulgaris Tour (2007–2008)
- Queens of the Stone Age Re-Release Tour (2011)
- ...Like Clockwork Tour (2013–14)
- Villains World Tour (2017–2018)
- The End Is Nero Tour (2023–2025)
- The Catacombs Tour (2025–2026)
- Perfecth World Tour (2027)

== Awards and nominations ==
Award	Year	Nominee(s)	Category	Result	Ref.
BMI London Awards	2004	"Go with the Flow"	Pop Award	Won	

Award	Year	Nominee(s)	Category	Result	Ref.
Kerrang! Awards	2000	Themselves	Best International Newcomer	Won	
NME Awards	2001	Themselves	Best Metal Act	Nominated	
Žebřík Music Awards	2002	Themselves	Best International Surprise	Nominated	
MTV Video Music Awards	2003	"Go with the Flow"	Best Visual Effects	Won	
MTV Video Music Awards	2003	"Go with the Flow"	Breakthrough Video	Nominated	
MTV Video Music Awards	2003	"Go with the Flow"	Best Art Direction	Nominated	
NME Awards	2004	Themselves	Best Live Band	Won	
Grammy Awards	2002	"No One Knows"	Best Hard Rock Performance	Nominated	
Grammy Awards	2003	"Go with the Flow"	Best Hard Rock Performance	Nominated	
Grammy Awards	2005	"Little Sister"	Best Hard Rock Performance	Nominated	
Grammy Awards	2007	"Sick, Sick, Sick"	Best Hard Rock Performance	Nominated	
Grammy Awards	2014	...Like Clockwork	Best Rock Album	Nominated	
Grammy Awards	2014	"My God Is the Sun"	Best Rock Performance	Nominated	
Grammy Awards	2018	Villains	Best Rock Album	Nominated	
Grammy Awards	2024	"Emotion Sickness"	Best Rock Song	Nominated	
Grammy Awards	2024	In Times New Roman...	Best Rock Album	Nominated	

== See also ==
- Palm Desert Scene
