= Alive in the Catacombs =

2025 concert film by Queens of the Stone Age

- EP cover art

Video / live EP by Queens of the Stone Age
- Released: June 5, 2025 (video); June 13, 2025 (EP)
- Recorded: July 8, 2024
- Venue: Catacombs of Paris
- Length: 28:51 (video); 27:02 (EP)
- Label: Matador
- Producer: Mark Rankin

Queens of the Stone Age chronology
In Times New Roman... (2023)	Alive in the Catacombs (2025)	Perfecth (2026)

Film poster

Alive in the Catacombs is a concert film and extended play (EP) by American rock band Queens of the Stone Age, documenting the band's performance in the Catacombs of Paris on July 8, 2024. Performed acoustically, it marked the first time a musical act has legally played in the Catacombs with the city's permission. The film was released on June 5, 2025, with an audio-only extended play of the performance coming out on June 13, 2025.

== Recording and release ==
Frontman Josh Homme said that playing Album of the Week in Paris gave the band some connections who assisted in getting a recording in the city's Catacombs to happen. They asked a few times and were rejected, about which Homme said, "I never thought it would happen, but there's no reason to stop trying." With the help of an insider Paris official, they eventually received permission, marking the first time a musical act has legally played in the Catacombs with the city's permission. The show was filmed a few days after the band announced that some The End is Nero World Tour dates would be canceled due to Homme's health issues; the recording took place on July 8, 2024, and Homme flew back to the U.S. for emergency surgery the following day.

Speaking of the decision to make the concert an acoustic one, Homme discussed the influence of the Catacombs: "We're so stripped down because that place is so stripped down, which makes the music so stripped down, which makes the words so stripped down. It would be ridiculous to try to rock there. All those decisions were made by that space. That space dictates everything, it's in charge. You do what you're told when you're in there."

The film was released digitally on June 5, 2025, along with a documentary by Andreas Neumann called Alive in Paris and Before, featuring the band's process getting ready to record the film. An audio-only version was released in an EP format on June 13, 2025, along with a vinyl edition.

The band embarked on The Catacombs Tour in October 2025 to support the release of the EP, featuring stripped-down and orchestral versions of songs performed at historic theaters.

In December 2025 both Alive in the Catacombs and the Alive in Paris and Before documentary were posted onto the band's official YouTube page.

== Reception ==
Professional ratings
Review scores
Source	Rating
NME	4/5 stars
Spill Magazine	5/5

The concert film received positive reviews. Andrew Trendell of NME said it was "starkly beautiful" and that the music "hits differently" when taking into consideration the mini documentary accompanying the film. Spill Magazine added that it's one of the "strongest creative statements from Queens Of The Stone Age, while also serving as an arresting performance that should be among the greatest of live albums."

== Track listing ==
All tracks are written by Josh Homme, Troy Van Leeuwen, Dean Fertita, Michael Shuman, and Jon Theodore, except where noted.

No.	Title	Writer(s)	Original album	Length
1.	"Running Joke / Paper Machete"		Era Vulgaris (2007) / In Times New Roman... (2023)	5:32
2.	"Kalopsia"		...Like Clockwork (2013)	5:14
3.	"Villains of Circumstance"		Villains (2017)	5:57
4.	"Suture Up Your Future"	Homme, Van Leeuwen, Joey Castillo	Era Vulgaris (2007)	4:36
5.	"I Never Came"	Homme, Van Leeuwen, Castillo	Lullabies to Paralyze (2005)	5:41
Total length:				27:02

In the credits for the video version Homme can be heard singing the then-unreleased song "Insignificant Other".

== Personnel ==
Queens of the Stone Age

- Josh Homme – lead vocals, sound director
- Troy Van Leeuwen – acoustic guitar, synth, backing vocals
- Dean Fertita – synth, glockenspiel
- Michael Shuman – acoustic bass guitar, backing vocals
- Jon Theodore – percussion

Strings

- Christelle Lassort Kiki
- Bella June Bozic
- Cécile Lacharme

Additional personnel

- Thomas Rames – director
- Mark Rankin – production, recording, sound director
- Gavin Lurssen – mastering
- FX Delaby – sound director
- Henri d'Armancourt – sound director
- Théo Fauger – director of photography
- La Blogotheque – production company
- Ondine Benetier & Anousonne Savanchomkeo – executive producer
- Esther – production manager
- Alice Delalle – production assistant
- Paul Pecastaing – production assistant
- Louise Taillan – production assistant
- Yasmina Chambenoit – assistant director
- Clara Griot – camera operator
- Titouan Deniaud – camera operator
- Katia Hamnane – steadicam
- Alban Lejeune – sound engineer
- Alexandre Sellem – editor
- Andreas Neumann – photography and introduction

== Charts ==
Chart performance for Alive in the Catacombs
Chart (2025–2026)	Peak position
Australian Albums (ARIA)	77
Belgian Albums (Ultratop Flanders)	84
Dutch Vinyl Albums (GfK Dutch Charts)	24
Scottish Albums (Official Charts)	18
UK Albums Sales (OCC)	23
UK Independent Albums (Official Charts)	13
UK Rock & Metal Albums (Official Charts)	6
US Top Current Albums (Billboard)	44
