= Sick, Sick, Sick =

Single by Queens of the Stone Age

from the album Era Vulgaris
- Released: May 8, 2007
- Genre: Stoner rock; noise rock; garage rock
- Length: 3:34
- Label: Interscope
- Songwriters: Josh Homme; Troy Van Leeuwen; Joey Castillo; Chris Goss
- Producers: Chris Goss; Josh Homme

Queens of the Stone Age singles chronology
"Burn the Witch" (2005)	"Sick, Sick, Sick" (2007)	"3's & 7's" (2007)

"Sick, Sick, Sick" is a song by American rock band Queens of the Stone Age from their 2007 album Era Vulgaris. It was released as a digital download from the U.S. iTunes Store on May 8, 2007. The song features Julian Casablancas of The Strokes on backing vocals and synth guitar. An EP also called Sick, Sick, Sick was given a limited release, containing the title track and three B-sides: a remix of "I'm Designer" and covers of Tom Waits' "Goin' Out West" and Elliott Smith's "Christian Brothers".

In a May 2007 interview with Dose magazine, frontman Josh Homme stated that the song is "the Fairy God Prince of the Gutter, touching everyone on the head and releasing them from their shackles of guilt".

== Composition ==
The song is played in C Standard in the key of F Major, and is based around a repeating Cm7 chord in the verses, with the choruses consisting of a lick off said chord.

== Track listing ==
1. "Sick, Sick, Sick" (Homme, Van Leeuwen, Castillo, Goss) - 3:35
2. "I'm Designer" (Primal Scream Remix) (Homme, Van Leeuwen, Castillo) - 3:46
3. "Goin' Out West" (Waits, Brennan) - 3:27
4. "Christian Brothers" (Smith) - 4:23

== Personnel ==
Queens of the Stone Age

- Josh Homme – vocals, guitars
- Troy Van Leeuwen – bass, keys, guitar, backing vocals
- Joey Castillo – drums

Additional performers

- Chris Goss – "Twinkley bits"
- Julian Casablancas – Casio guitar, vocals

== Music video ==
Director Brett Simon shot a video for "Sick, Sick, Sick" on April 25, 2007. It features the band performing "at a dinner party, audience of one" at a "remote homemade church-castle in East LA". The video starts with images of food being prepared and human fingers being rubbed with seasoning. A classy, beautiful woman in black is sitting alone at a huge dinner table piled high with food, enjoying her meal and watching the band perform in front of her. It is then revealed that each member of the band is chained to the wall by their ankles. Every time the woman rings a bell, masked men dressed as chefs collect a band member by the chain and lead him away to be butchered, cooked, and served to the woman. This is largely symbolized with footage of the band playing in a red, oven-like environment, with flashes of them having their mouths stuffed with vegetables.

The rest of the band continue to play while the woman consumes fingers and other body parts. Instead of getting full, the woman gets hungrier and more unhinged. By the time frontman Josh Homme is the only one left, she is crawling on the table, stuffing food into her mouth with both hands. Homme watches this while performing and kicking his ankle chain around. The woman looks him right in the eye and rings the bell for him to be cooked. He is led away and joins the rest of the band playing in the "oven" as the woman collapses on the table, exhausted but still eating.

Liam Lynch directed the official alternate video for the song. It was released on queensofthestoneage.de on May 30, and was made by Lynch at his expense (i.e. without being commissioned, outside of the label), but once it was finished the label picked it up and made it the official video for Germany. The video, which stars Lynch, Homme, and Wendy Rae Fowler (in her fourth appearance in a Queens of the Stone Age video, among them "Burn the Witch") was shot at Lynch's house in front of a green screen, without any crew. Later, animation similar to the "Go with the Flow" video was added.

== In the media ==
The song appears in a three-song pack, along with other Queens of the Stone Age songs "Little Sister" and "3's and 7's", as downloadable content for the music video game series Rock Band. It also appears on the soundtrack of the game MotorStorm: Pacific Rift and is playable in Guitar Hero: Van Halen. Along with "Make It wit Chu", it was featured in the Warren Miller documentary Playground. It can also be heard in the opening of the CSI: NY fourth season episode You Only Die Once.

== Charts ==
Chart (2007)	Peak position
Austria (Ö3 Austria Top 40)	65
Czech Republic Modern Rock (IFPI)	15
Netherlands (Single Top 100)	91
Finland (Suomen virallinen lista)	18
Germany (GfK)	77
US Mainstream Rock (Billboard)	40
US Alternative Airplay (Billboard)	23
