= 3's & 7's =

Single by Queens of the Stone Age

from the album Era Vulgaris
- Released: June 4, 2007
- Genre: Hard rock; stoner rock; garage rock; blues rock
- Length: 3:34
- Label: Interscope
- Songwriters: Josh Homme; Troy Van Leeuwen; Joey Castillo
- Producers: Chris Goss; Josh Homme

Queens of the Stone Age singles chronology
"Sick, Sick, Sick" (2007)	"3's & 7's" (2007)	"The Fun Machine Took a Shit & Died" (2007)

Alternative cover
- Cover of the limited edition Vinyl release

"3's & 7's" is the second single by Queens of the Stone Age from their 2007 album Era Vulgaris. It was released on June 4, 2007 and followed the digital download-only "Sick, Sick, Sick". The single debuted at number one on the UK Rock & Metal Chart and number 19 on the UK Singles Chart.

== Music video ==
A video for the song was shot in Joshua Tree and directed by Paul Minor, whose previous music promo work included "Starlight" by Muse. After a number of images were placed on photo-sharing website Flickr, the video in its entirety was added to iFilm on September 26, 2007, a full three months after the single's European release. The video itself is a trailer for a fake movie entitled "3's & 7's" and is shot in a similar style to the exploitation films of the 1960s and the 2007 film Grindhouse. Two versions of the video exist. The first version of the video contained full-frontal nudity. This version was then re-edited to remove all nudity, and the first version was then replaced with version two.

== Track listings ==
CD

1. "3's & 7's" – 3:34
2. "Christian Brothers" – 4:25 (Elliott Smith cover)

7" - 1

A: "3's & 7's" – 3:34
B1: "Sick, Sick, Sick" – 3:34
B2: "I'm Designer – Remix" – 3:49

7" - 2

A: "3's & 7's" – 3:34
B1: "Sick, Sick, Sick" – 3:34
B2: "Goin' Out West" – 3:26 (Tom Waits cover)

== Other versions ==
There are two other versions of this song.

1. "3's & 7's" - 3:37 (Pre-Version)
2. "3's & 7's" - 3:17 (Radio Edit)

The pre-version of the song that was uploaded to the band's Myspace page features different vocal notes during the first half of the bridge, and different lyrics in the second half.

The lyrics that appear in the Era Vulgaris version are:

What'd you do? Say it with a smile, boy
Making us all forget
What'd you do? Say it with a smile, boy
Making us all forget
Making us all forget
Making us all forget

And the pre-version's lyrics are:

The truth has always had three sides:
Mine, yours and how it went
The truth has always been a lie
But I’m never telling it
Making you all forget
Making you all forget
I swear to God

The pre-version appeared in Guitar Hero III: Legends of Rock part of the main setlist and as downloadable content for the Rock Band games.

== Personnel ==
- Josh Homme – vocals, lead guitar, bass, electric piano
- Troy Van Leeuwen – rhythm guitar, lap steel guitar
- Joey Castillo – drums

== Charts ==
Chart (2007)	Peak position
Ireland (IRMA)	36
Scottish Singles Sales (Official Charts)	2
UK Singles (Official Charts)	19
UK Rock & Metal (Official Charts)	1
US Alternative Airplay (Billboard)	25
