= List of songs recorded by Queens of the Stone Age =

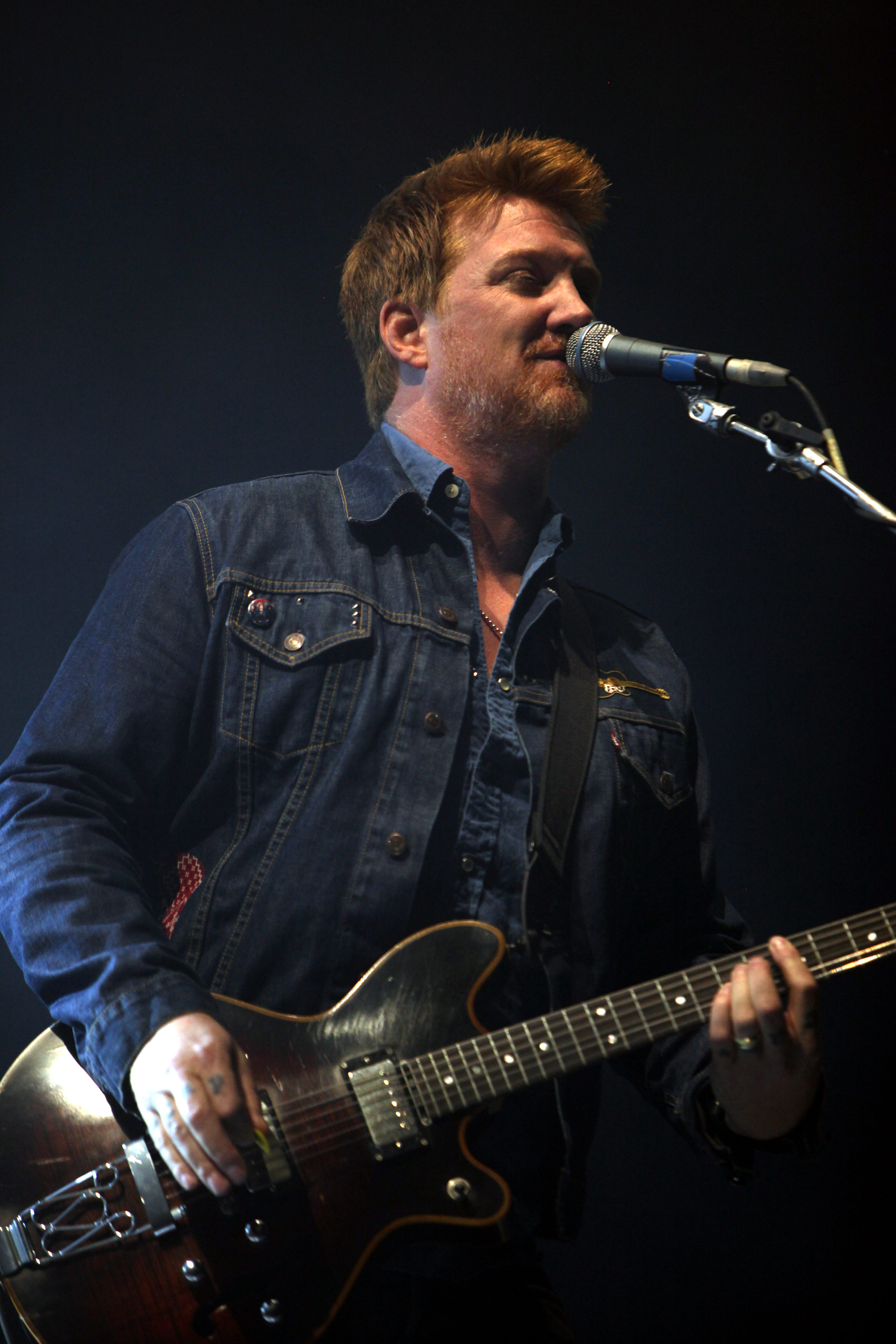
Josh Homme has performed and recorded with the band since its inception in 1996 and has been the only constant member of the band.

Queens of the Stone Age is an American rock band formed in 1996 in Palm Desert, California. The band's line-up includes founder Josh Homme (lead vocals, guitar, piano), alongside longtime members Troy Van Leeuwen (guitar, lap steel, keyboard, percussion, backing vocals), Michael Shuman (bass guitar, keyboard, backing vocals), Dean Fertita (keyboards, guitar, percussion, backing vocals), and recent addition Jon Theodore (drums, percussion). Formed after the dissolution of Homme's previous band, Kyuss, Queens of the Stone Age developed a style of riff-oriented, heavy rock music. Their sound has since evolved to incorporate a variety of different styles and influences, including working with ZZ Top member Billy Gibbons, Nirvana drummer and Foo Fighters frontman Dave Grohl, and steady contributor Mark Lanegan.

== Songs ==
Key
†	Indicates song was not written by Queens of the Stone Age
#	Indicates song was written as part of the Desert Sessions
‡	Indicates single release

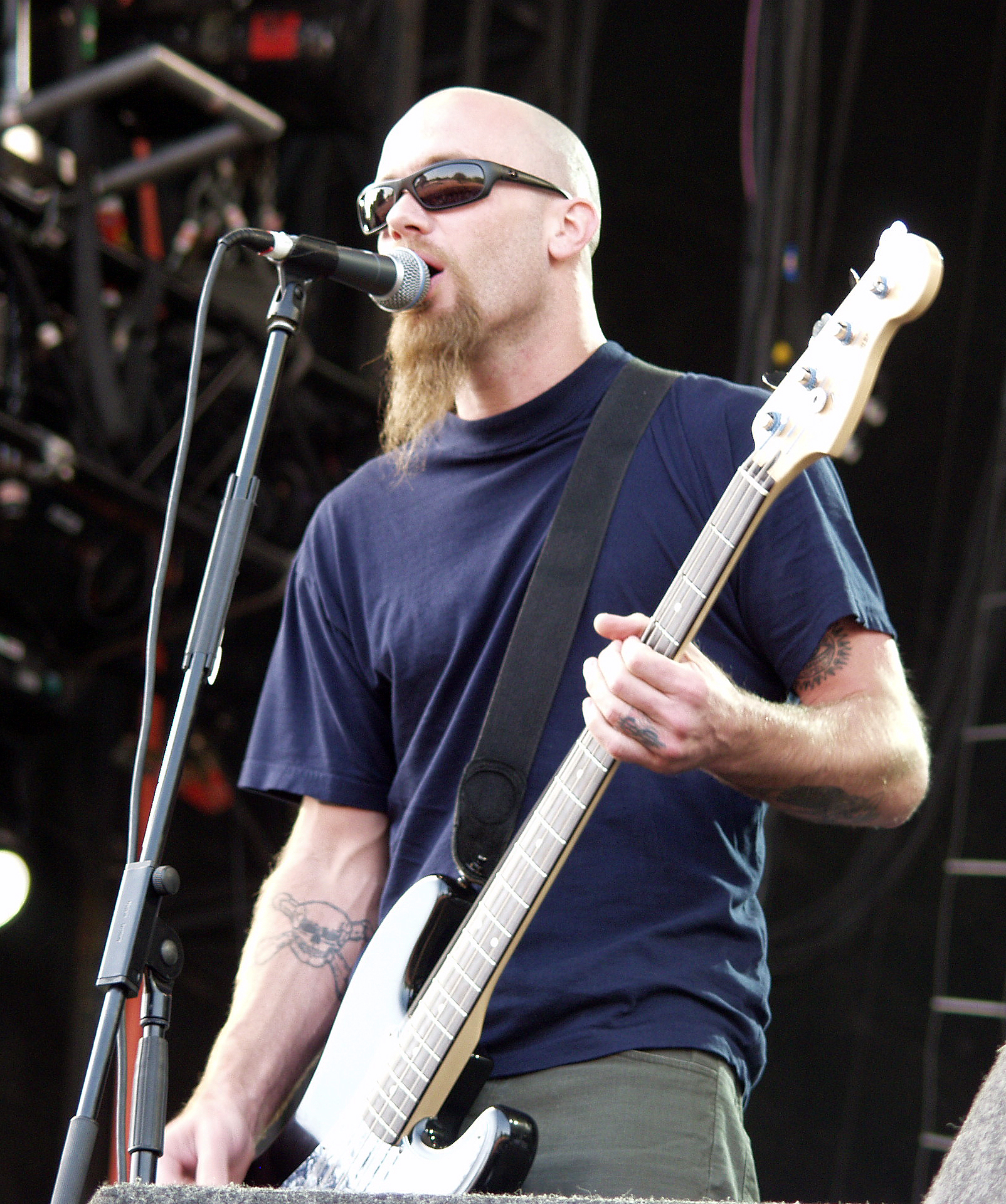
Nick Oliveri was a major contributor to Queens of the Stone Age from 1998 to 2004.

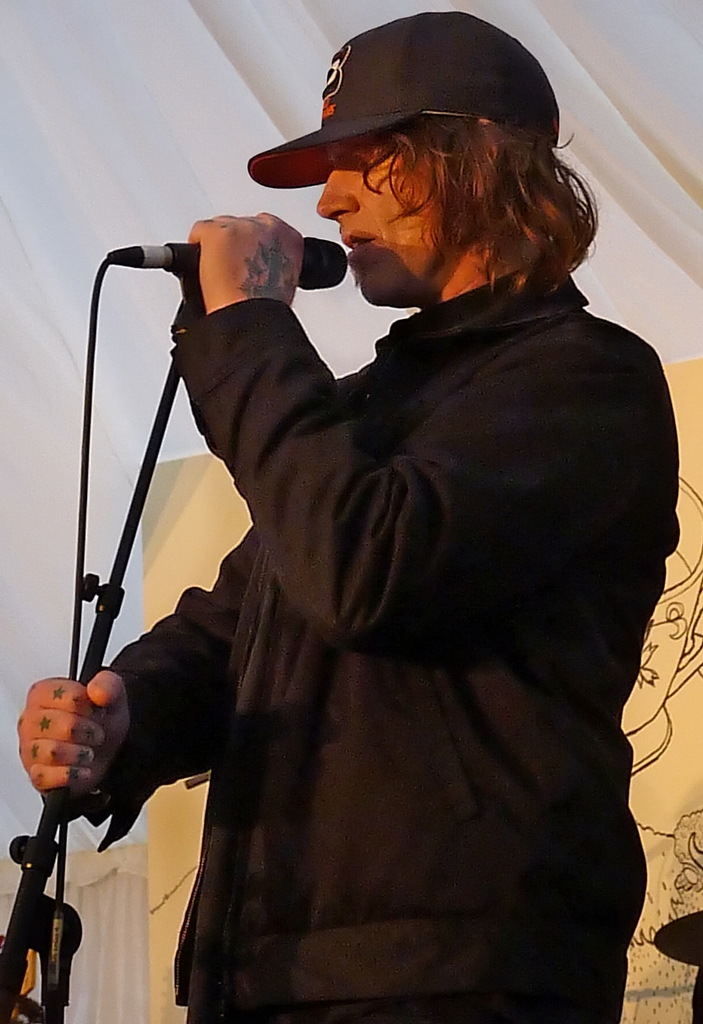
Mark Lanegan had been a steady contributor to the band from 2000 through ...Like Clockwork.

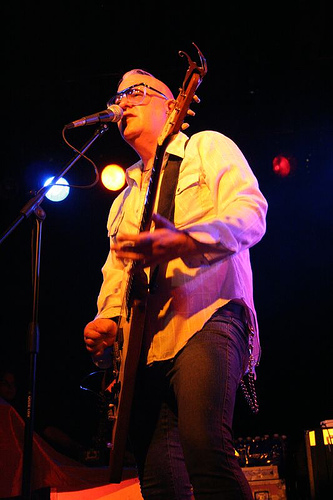
Dave Catching is featured on the first four Queens of the Stone Age albums, providing guitar, lap steel and keyboards.

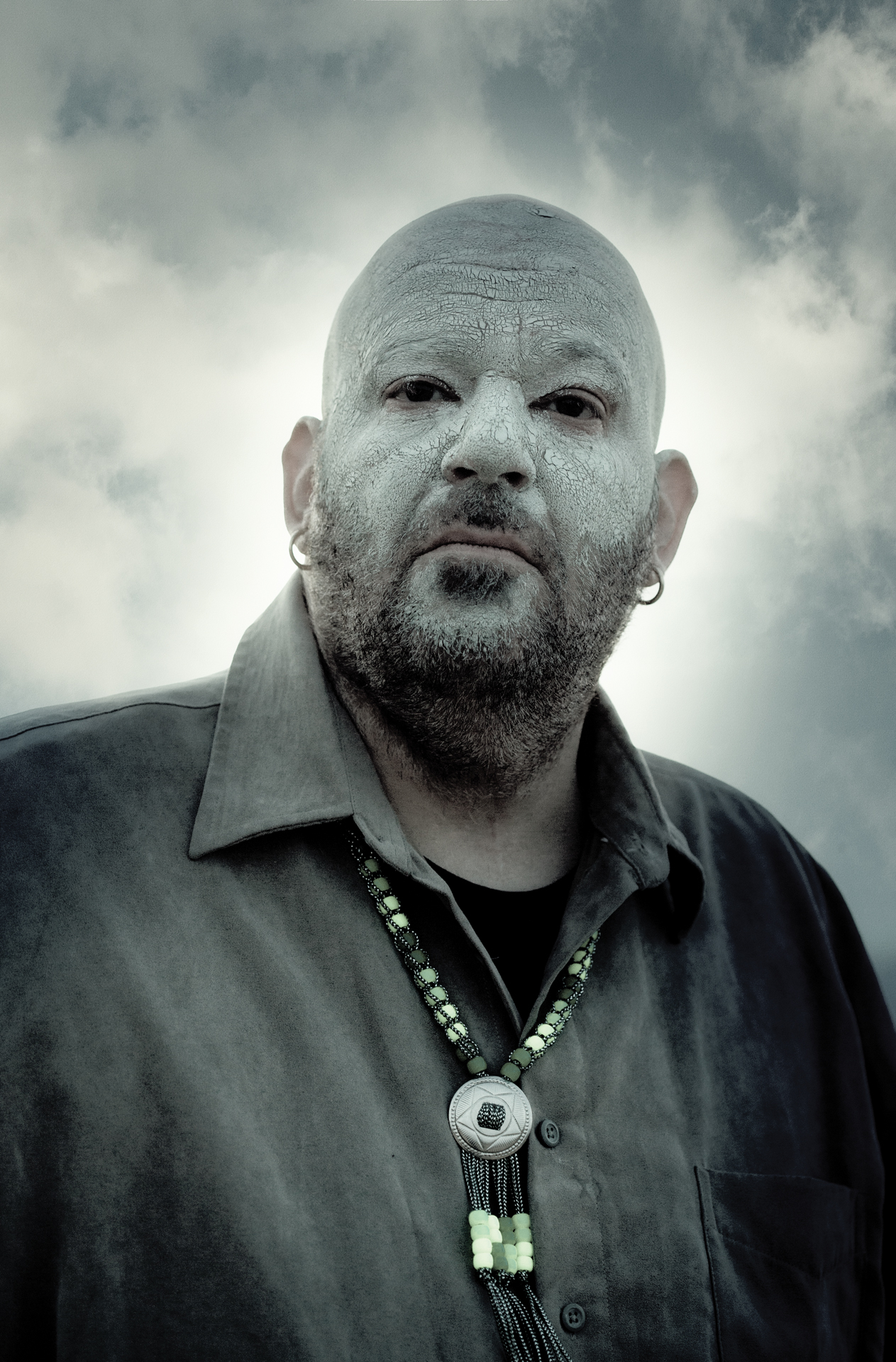
Chris Goss produced the band's 2000 album Rated R and the band's 2007 album Era Vulgaris, Goss has also played on a number of Queens of the Stone Age songs.

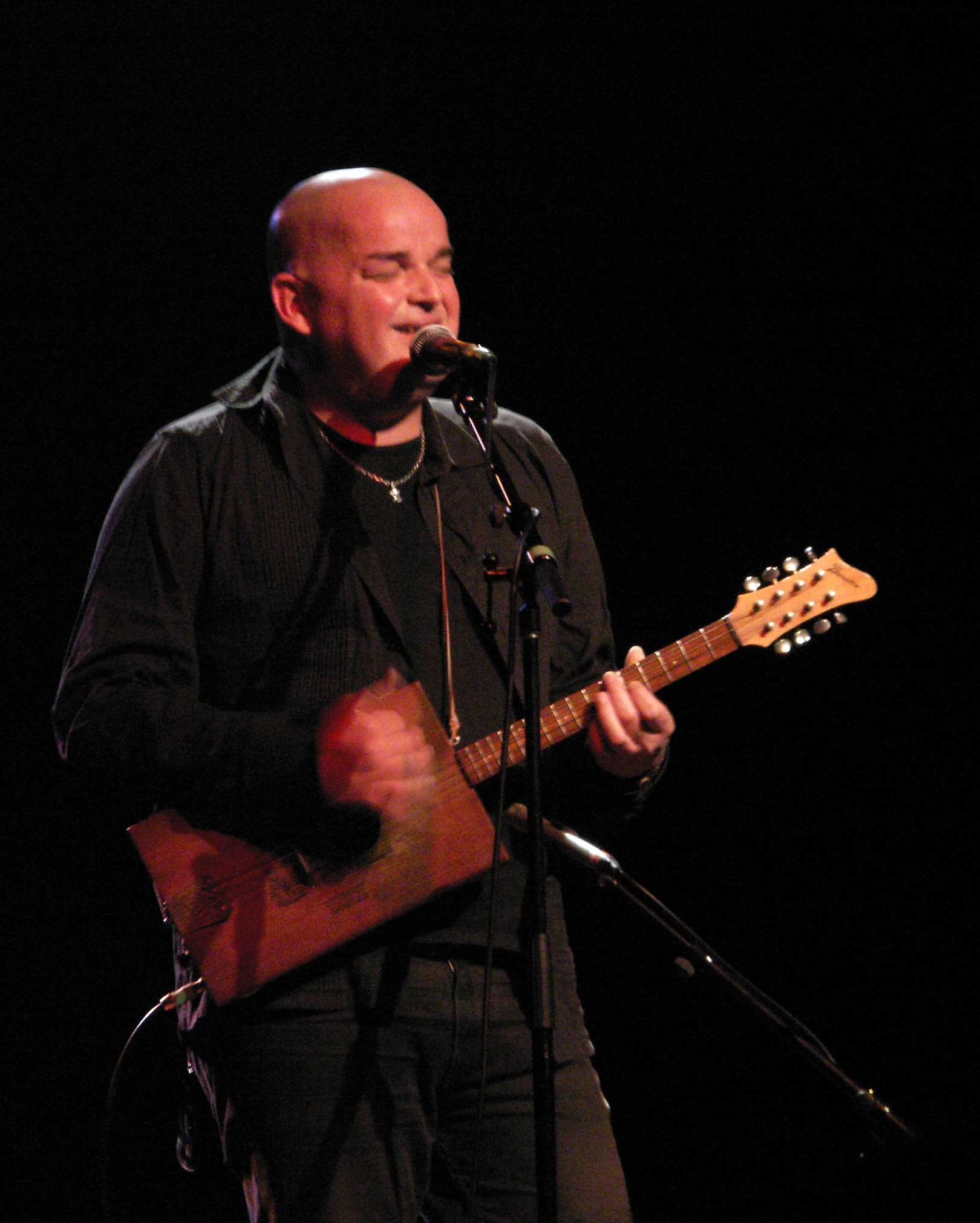
Alain Johannes has been a close collaborator of the band since 2000.

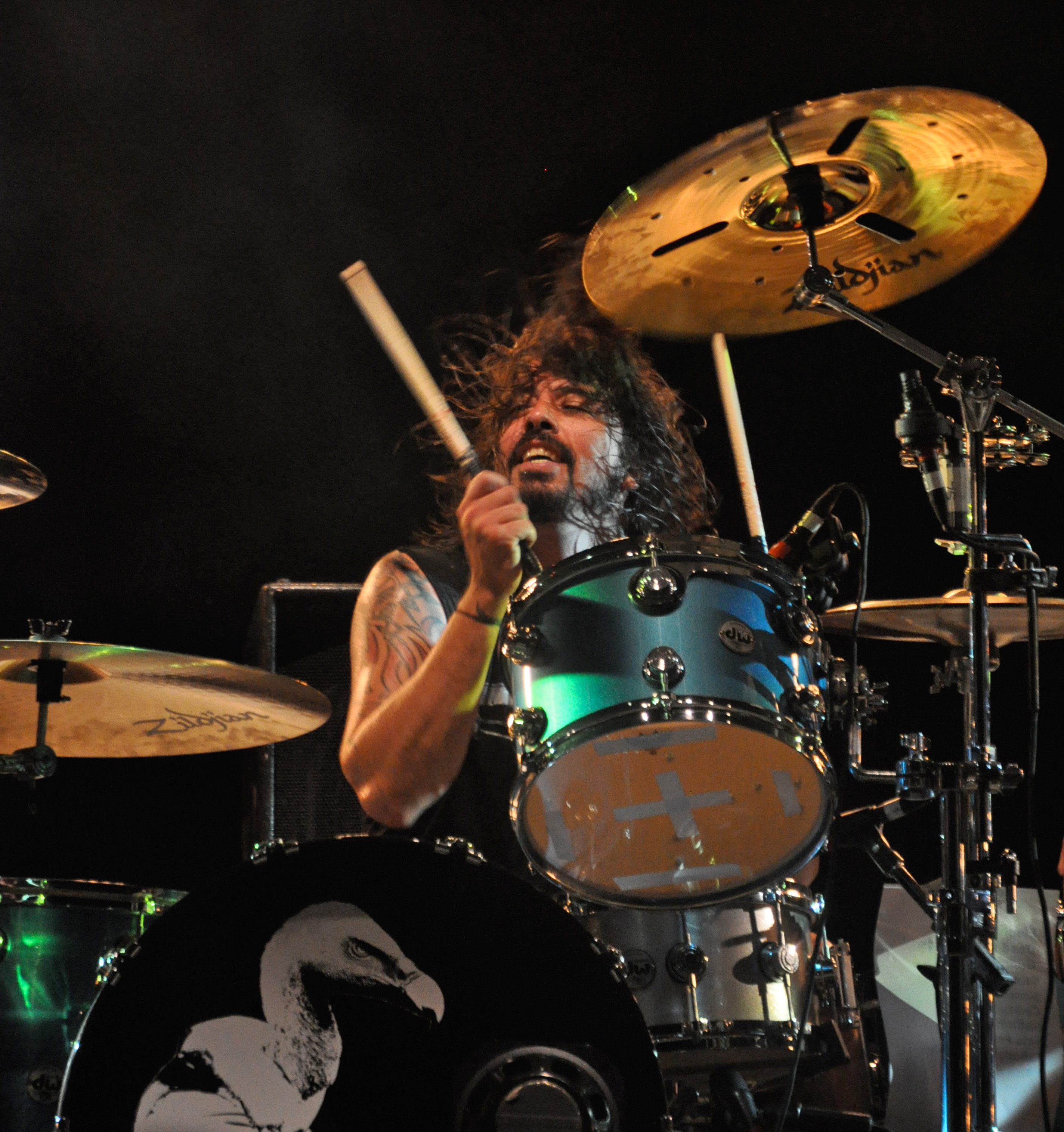
Dave Grohl was a member of the band during their Songs for the Deaf era and also contributed on their 2013 album ...Like Clockwork.

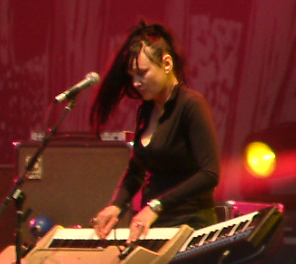
Natasha Shneider recorded with the band, providing keyboards and piano. Schneider subsequently appeared on Songs for the Deaf, performing on three of the album's tracks, and joined the band as a full member in 2005 during the Lullabies to Paralyze tour.

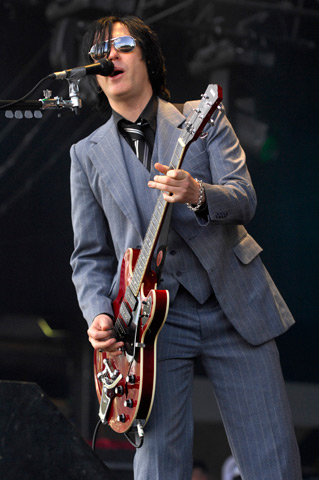
Troy Van Leeuwen has been the band's second guitarist and multi-instrumentalist since 2002, joining the band for the tour preceding the release of Songs for the Deaf.

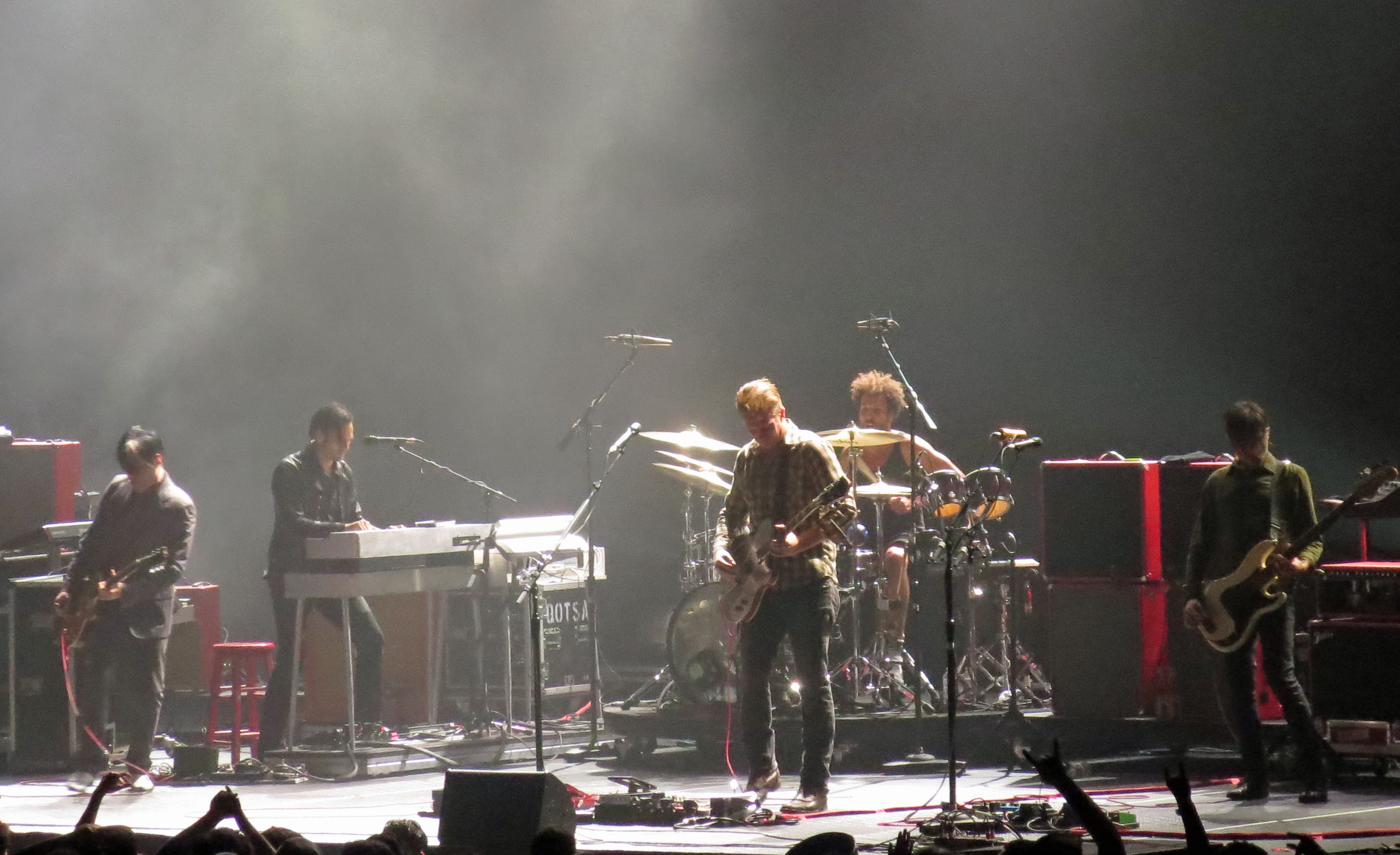
In 2013, Queens of the Stone Age consisted of long-time members Homme, Troy Van Leeuwen, Dean Fertita, Michael Shuman and Jon Theodore.

Name of song, featured performers, writers, producers, originating album, and year released.
Song	Performers (Note: This column lists each musician who performed on a song with the exception of performers who only provided backing vocals. Official members of Queens of the Stone Age will be listed first, then non-member performers will be listed below.)	Songwriter(s)	Producer(s)	Album	Year	Ref(s)
"18 A.D."	Josh Homme Eva Nahon Milo Beenhakker	Josh Homme Dave Catching	Josh Homme Hutch	Burn One Up!	1997	
"3's & 7's" ‡	Josh Homme Troy Van Leeuwen Joey Castillo	Josh Homme Chris Goss Troy Van Leeuwen Joey Castillo	Josh Homme Chris Goss	Era Vulgaris	2007	
"Another Love Song"	Nick Oliveri Josh Homme Dave Grohl Alain Johannes Natasha Shneider	Josh Homme Nick Oliveri	Josh Homme Eric Valentine	Songs for the Deaf	2002	
"Auto Pilot"	Nick Oliveri Josh Homme Chris Goss Dave Catching Nick Lucero	Josh Homme Nick Oliveri	Josh Homme Chris Goss	Rated R	2000	
"Avon"	Josh Homme Alfredo Hernández	Josh Homme #	Josh Homme Joe Barresi	Queens of the Stone Age	1998	
"Back to Dungaree High" (Turbonegro cover)	Nick Olivieri Josh Homme Dave Catching Gene Trautman	†	Alain Johannes	Alpha Motherfuckers: A Tribute to Turbonegro	2001	
"Battery Acid"	Josh Homme Troy Van Leeuwen Joey Castillo Chris Goss	Josh Homme Troy Van Leeuwen Joey Castillo	Josh Homme Chris Goss	Era Vulgaris	2007	
"Better Living Through Chemistry"	Josh Homme Nick Oliveri Nick Lucero Dave Catching Barrett Martin	Josh Homme Nick Oliveri	Josh Homme Chris Goss	Rated R	2000	
"The Blood Is Love"	Josh Homme Troy Van Leeuwen Joey Castillo David Catching Alain Johannes	Josh Homme Troy Van Leeuwen Joey Castillo	Josh Homme Joe Barresi	Lullabies to Paralyze	2005	
"Bloody Hammer" (Roky Erickson cover)	Nick Oliveri	Roky Erickson †		Songs for the Deaf (US vinyl version)	2002	
"Born to Hula"	Josh Homme Vic "The Stick" Indrizzo	Josh Homme	Josh Homme Chris Goss	Gamma Ray	1996	
"Born to Hula"	Josh Homme Nick Oliveri Gene Trautmann Dave Catching	Josh Homme	Josh Homme	Stone Age Complication	2000	
"Broken Box"	Josh Homme Troy Van Leeuwen Joey Castillo	Josh Homme Troy Van Leeuwen Joey Castillo	Josh Homme Joe Barresi	Lullabies to Paralyze	2005	
"The Bronze"			Joe Barresi	The Split CD	1998	
"Burn the Witch" ‡	Josh Homme Mark Lanegan Troy Van Leeuwen Joey Castillo Alain Johannes Billy Gibbons	Josh Homme Troy Van Leeuwen Joey Castillo	Josh Homme Joe Barresi	Lullabies to Paralyze	2005	
"Christian Brothers" (Elliott Smith cover)	Josh Homme Troy Van Leeuwen Joey Castillo Michael Shuman Dean Fertita	Elliott Smith †	Josh Homme	Era Vulgaris (Canadian tour limited edition)	2008	
"Do It Again"	Josh Homme Nick Oliveri Dave Grohl Chris Goss	Josh Homme Nick Oliveri	Josh Homme Adam Kasper	Songs for the Deaf	2002	
"Domesticated Animals"	Josh Homme Troy Van Leeuwen Dean Fertita Michael Shuman Jon Theodore	Josh Homme Troy Van Leeuwen Dean Fertita Michael Shuman Jon Theodore	Mark Ronson Mark Rankin	Villains	2017	
"Easy Street"‡	Josh Homme Troy Van Leeuwen Dean Fertita Jon Theodore Nikki Lane	Josh Homme Troy Van Leeuwen Dean Fertita Micheal Shuman Jon Theodore	Josh Homme Micheal Shuman	Perfecth	2026	
"Era Vulgaris"	Josh Homme Troy Van Leeuwen Joey Castillo Trent Reznor	Josh Homme Troy Van Leeuwen Joey Castillo	Josh Homme Chris Goss	Era Vulgaris (Australia/New Zealand/UK versions)	2007	
"Everybody Knows That You Are Insane"	Josh Homme Troy Van Leeuwen Joey Castillo Alain Johannes	Josh Homme Troy Van Leeuwen Joey Castillo	Josh Homme Joe Barresi	Lullabies to Paralyze	2005	
"Everybody's Gonna Be Happy" (The Kinks cover)	Josh Homme Nick Oliveri Dave Grohl	Ray Davies †	Josh Homme Eric Valentine	Songs for the Deaf (international version)	2002	
"The Evil Has Landed" ‡	Josh Homme Troy Van Leeuwen Dean Fertita Michael Shuman Jon Theodore	Josh Homme Troy Van Leeuwen Dean Fertita Michael Shuman Jon Theodore	Mark Ronson Mark Rankin	Villains	2017	
"Fairweather Friends"	Josh Homme Troy Van Leeuwen Dean Fertita Michael Shuman Dave Grohl Elton John	Josh Homme Troy Van Leeuwen Dean Fertita Michael Shuman Mark Lanegan	Josh Homme Troy Van Leeuwen Dean Fertita Michael Shuman	...Like Clockwork	2013	
"Feet Don't Fail Me"	Josh Homme Troy Van Leeuwen Dean Fertita Michael Shuman Jon Theodore	Josh Homme Troy Van Leeuwen Dean Fertita Michael Shuman Jon Theodore	Mark Ronson Mark Rankin	Villains	2017	
"Feel Good Hit of the Summer" ‡	Josh Homme Nick Oliveri Gene Trautmann Dave Catching Chris Goss	Josh Homme Nick Oliveri	Josh Homme Chris Goss	Rated R	2000	
"Feel Good Hit of the Summer" (Reprise)	Josh Homme Nick Oliveri Gene Trautmann Dave Catching Chris Goss	Josh Homme Nick Oliveri	Josh Homme Chris Goss	Rated R	2000	
"First It Giveth" ‡	Josh Homme Nick Oliveri Dave Grohl Alain Johannes	Josh Homme Nick Oliveri	Josh Homme Eric Valentine	Songs for the Deaf	2002	
"Fortress"	Josh Homme Troy Van Leeuwen Dean Fertita Michael Shuman Jon Theodore	Josh Homme Troy Van Leeuwen Dean Fertita Michael Shuman Jon Theodore	Mark Ronson Mark Rankin	Villains	2017	
"The Fun Machine Took a Shit and Died" ‡		Josh Homme		None (Note: A rough studio version of the song was placed on a series of 7" vinyl records, handed out to those who had tickets to the cancelled London shows.)	2005	
"The Fun Machine Took a Shit and Died" ‡	Josh Homme Troy Van Leeuwen Joey Castillo Alain Johannes	Josh Homme	Josh Homme Chris Goss	Era Vulgaris (Japanese version)	2007	
"Give the Mule What He Wants"	Josh Homme Alfredo Hernández Chris Goss	Josh Homme Alfredo Hernández	Josh Homme Joe Barresi	Queens of the Stone Age	1998	
"Go with the Flow" ‡	Josh Homme Nick Oliveri Gene Trautmann Brendon McNichol	Josh Homme Nick Oliveri	Josh Homme Eric Valentine	Songs for the Deaf	2002	
"God Is in the Radio"	Mark Lanegan Josh Homme Nick Oliveri Dave Grohl	Josh Homme Nick Oliveri	Josh Homme Eric Valentine	Songs for the Deaf	2002	
"Goin' Out West" (Tom Waits cover)	Josh Homme Troy Van Leeuwen Joey Castillo	Tom Waits Kathleen Brennan †	Josh Homme	Era Vulgaris (Russian version)	2007	
"Gonna Leave You"	Nick Oliveri Josh Homme Dave Grohl Dean Ween	Josh Homme Nick Oliveri	Josh Homme Eric Valentine	Songs for the Deaf	2002	
"Gonna Leave You" (Spanish version)	Nick Oliveri Josh Homme Dave Grohl Dean Ween	Josh Homme Nick Oliveri	Josh Homme Eric Valentine	Songs for the Deaf (Japanese version)	2002	
"Hangin' Tree"	Mark Lanegan Josh Homme Nick Oliveri Dave Grohl	Josh Homme Alain Johannes #	Josh Homme Eric Valentine	Songs for the Deaf	2002	
"Head Like a Haunted House"	Josh Homme Troy Van Leeuwen Dean Fertita Michael Shuman Jon Theodore	Josh Homme Troy Van Leeuwen Dean Fertita Michael Shuman Jon Theodore	Mark Ronson Mark Rankin	Villains	2017	
"Hideaway"	Josh Homme Troy Van Leeuwen Dean Fertita Michael Shuman Jon Theodore	Josh Homme Troy Van Leeuwen Dean Fertita Michael Shuman Jon Theodore	Mark Ronson Mark Rankin	Villains	2017	
"Hispanic Impressions"	Josh Homme Alfredo Hernández	Josh Homme Alfredo Hernández	Josh Homme Joe Barresi	Queens of the Stone Age	1998	
"How to Handle a Rope"	Josh Homme Alfredo Hernández	Josh Homme Alfredo Hernández	Josh Homme Joe Barresi	Queens of the Stone Age	1998	
"I Appear Missing"	Josh Homme Troy Van Leeuwen Dean Fertita Michael Shuman Dave Grohl	Josh Homme Troy Van Leeuwen Dean Fertita Michael Shuman	Josh Homme Troy Van Leeuwen Dean Fertita Michael Shuman	...Like Clockwork	2013	
"I Never Came"	Josh Homme Troy Van Leeuwen Joey Castillo	Josh Homme Troy Van Leeuwen Joey Castillo	Josh Homme Joe Barresi	Lullabies to Paralyze	2005	
"I Sat by the Ocean" ‡	Josh Homme Troy Van Leeuwen Dean Fertita Michael Shuman Joey Castillo	Josh Homme Troy Van Leeuwen Dean Fertita Michael Shuman	Josh Homme Troy Van Leeuwen Dean Fertita Michael Shuman	...Like Clockwork	2013	
"I Think I Lost My Headache"	Josh Homme Nick Oliveri Dave Catching Nick Lucero Barrett Martin Fernando Pullum Reggie Young Scott Mayo	Josh Homme Nick Oliveri	Josh Homme Chris Goss	Rated R	2000	
"I Was a Teenage Hand Model"	Josh Homme Fred Drake Patrick "Hutch" Hutchinson Mike Johnson Dave Catching	Josh Homme Alfredo Hernández	Josh Homme Joe Barresi	Queens of the Stone Age	1998	
"If I Had a Tail"	Josh Homme Troy Van Leeuwen Dean Fertita Michael Shuman Dave Grohl	Josh Homme Troy Van Leeuwen Dean Fertita Michael Shuman	Josh Homme Troy Van Leeuwen Dean Fertita Michael Shuman	...Like Clockwork	2013	
"If Only" (a.k.a. "If Only Everything") ‡	Josh Homme Van Conner Vic "The Stick" Indrizzo	Josh Homme	Josh Homme Chris Goss	Gamma Ray	1996	
"If Only" (a.k.a. "If Only Everything") ‡	Josh Homme Alfredo Hernández	Josh Homme	Josh Homme Joe Barresi	Queens of the Stone Age	1998	
"I'm Designer"	Josh Homme Troy Van Leeuwen Joey Castillo Alain Johannes	Josh Homme Troy Van Leeuwen Joey Castillo	Josh Homme Chris Goss	Era Vulgaris	2007	
"In My Head" ‡	Josh Homme Troy Van Leeuwen Joey Castillo Alain Johannes	Josh Homme Troy Van Leeuwen Josh Freese Joey Castillo Alain Johannes #	Josh Homme Joe Barresi	Lullabies to Paralyze	2005	
"In the Fade"	Josh Homme Nick Oliveri Mark Lanegan Nick Lucero Dave Catching	Josh Homme Mark Lanegan	Josh Homme Chris Goss	Rated R	2000	
"Infinity"		Josh Homme	Josh Homme Chris Goss	Heavy Metal 2000 soundtrack	2000	
"Infinity"	Josh Homme Troy Van Leeuwen Joey Castillo Alain Johannes	Josh Homme	Josh Homme Joe Barresi	Lullabies to Paralyze (AntAcidAudio vinyl version)	2005	
"Insignificant Other"‡	Josh Homme Troy Van Leeuwen Dean Fertita Michael Shuman Jon Theodore	Josh Homme Troy Van Leeuwen Dean Fertita Michael Shuman Jon Theodore	Josh Homme Micheal Shuman	Perfecth	2026	
"Into the Hollow"	Josh Homme Troy Van Leeuwen Joey Castillo Chris Goss	Josh Homme Troy Van Leeuwen Joey Castillo	Josh Homme Chris Goss	Era Vulgaris	2007	
"Keep Your Eyes Peeled"	Josh Homme Troy Van Leeuwen Dean Fertita Michael Shuman Joey Castillo	Josh Homme Troy Van Leeuwen Dean Fertita Michael Shuman	Josh Homme Troy Van Leeuwen Dean Fertita Michael Shuman	...Like Clockwork	2013	
"Kalopsia"	Josh Homme Troy Van Leeuwen Dean Fertita Michael Shuman Joey Castillo Trent Reznor	Josh Homme Troy Van Leeuwen Dean Fertita Michael Shuman	Josh Homme Troy Van Leeuwen Dean Fertita Michael Shuman	...Like Clockwork	2013	
"Leg of Lamb"	Josh Homme Nick Oliveri Nick Lucero	Josh Homme Nick Oliveri	Josh Homme Chris Goss	Rated R	2000	
"Lightning Song"	Nick Oliveri Josh Homme Dave Catching Barrett Martin	Dave Catching	Josh Homme Chris Goss	Rated R	2000	
"Like a Drug"	Josh Homme Troy Van Leeuwen Joey Castillo Billy Gibbons Alain Johannes	#	Josh Homme Joe Barresi	Lullabies to Paralyze (deluxe edition)	2005	
"...Like Clockwork"	Josh Homme Troy Van Leeuwen Dean Fertita Michael Shuman Jon Theodore Charlie May	Josh Homme James Lavelle Charlie May	Josh Homme James Lavelle	...Like Clockwork	2013	
"Little Sister" ‡	Josh Homme Troy Van Leeuwen Joey Castillo Alain Johannes	Josh Homme Troy Van Leeuwen Joey Castillo	Josh Homme Joe Barresi	Lullabies to Paralyze	2005	
"Long Slow Goodbye"	Josh Homme Troy Van Leeuwen Joey Castillo Alain Johannes	Josh Homme Troy Van Leeuwen Joey Castillo Mark Lanegan	Josh Homme Joe Barresi	Lullabies to Paralyze	2005	
"The Lost Art of Keeping a Secret" ‡	Josh Homme Nick Oliveri Nick Lucero Dave Catching Barrett Martin Scott Mayo Chris Goss	Josh Homme Nick Oliveri	Josh Homme Chris Goss	Rated R	2000	
"Make It wit Chu" ‡	Josh Homme Troy Van Leeuwen Joey Castillo Alain Johannes	Josh Homme Alain Johannes Michael Melchiondo #	Josh Homme Chris Goss	Era Vulgaris	2007	
"Medication"	Josh Homme Troy Van Leeuwen Joey Castillo	Josh Homme Troy Van Leeuwen Joey Castillo Mark Lanegan	Josh Homme Joe Barresi	Lullabies to Paralyze	2005	
"Mexicola"	Josh Homme Alfredo Hernández	Josh Homme	Josh Homme Joe Barresi	Queens of the Stone Age	1998	
"Misfit Love"	Josh Homme Troy Van Leeuwen Joey Castillo Alain Johannes Chris Goss	Josh Homme Troy Van Leeuwen Joey Castillo	Josh Homme Chris Goss	Era Vulgaris	2007	
"Monsters in the Parasol"	Josh Homme Nick Oliveri Dave Catching Gene Trautmann	Josh Homme Mario Lalli #	Josh Homme Chris Goss	Rated R	2000	
"Mosquito Song"	Josh Homme Nick Oliveri Dave Grohl Dean Ween Alain Johannes Natasha Shneider Molly McGuire Brad Kintscher John Gove Kevin Porter Ana Lenchantin Paz Lenchantin	Josh Homme Nick Oliveri Michael Melchiondo	Josh Homme Eric Valentine	Songs for the Deaf	2002	
"Most Exalted Potentate of Love" (The Cramps cover)	Josh Homme Nick Oliveri Troy Van Leeuwen Joey Castillo	Lux Interior Poison Ivy Rorschach †	Josh Homme Nick Oliveri Troy Van Leeuwen Joey Castillo Alain Johannes	Stone Age Complication	2003	
"My God Is the Sun" ‡	Josh Homme Troy Van Leeuwen Dean Fertita Michael Shuman Dave Grohl	Josh Homme Troy Van Leeuwen Dean Fertita Michael Shuman	Josh Homme Troy Van Leeuwen Dean Fertita Michael Shuman	...Like Clockwork	2013	
"Needles in the Camel's Eye" (Brian Eno cover)	Josh Homme Troy Van Leeuwen Michael Shuman Dean Fertita Bobby Gillespie	Brian Eno Phil Manzanera †	Josh Homme	Era Vulgaris (Canadian tour limited edition)	2008	
"Never Say Never" (Romeo Void cover)	Josh Homme Nick Oliveri Brendon McNichol Gene Trautmann Natasha Schneider	Debora Iyall †	Alain Johannes	Rated R (UK special edition)	2000	
"No One Knows" ‡	Josh Homme Nick Oliveri Dave Grohl	Josh Homme Mark Lanegan	Josh Homme Eric Valentine	Songs for the Deaf	2002	
"Ode to Clarissa"	Nick Oliveri Dave Catching Gene Trautmann	Josh Homme Nick Oliveri	Josh Homme	Rated R (Japanese version)	2000	
"Outlaw Blues" (Bob Dylan cover)	Josh Homme Troy Van Leeuwen Dean Fertita Michael Shuman Joey Castillo	Bob Dylan †	Josh Homme	Chimes of Freedom	2012	
"Precious and Grace" (ZZ Top cover)	Mark Lanegan Josh Homme Troy Van Leeuwen Joey Castillo Billy Gibbons Alain Johannes	Billy Gibbons Dusty Hill Frank Beard†	Josh Homme Joe Barresi	Lullabies to Paralyze (UK version)	2005	
"Quick and to the Pointless"	Nick Oliveri Josh Homme Dave Cathching Gene Trautmann Fernando Pullum	Josh Homme Nick Oliveri	Josh Homme Chris Goss	Rated R	2000	
"The Real Song for the Deaf"		Josh Homme		Songs for the Deaf	2002	
"Regular John"	Josh Homme Alfredo Hernández	Josh Homme Alfredo Hernández John McBain	Josh Homme Joe Barresi	Queens of the Stone Age	1998	
"River in the Road"	Josh Homme Troy Van Leeuwen Joey Castillo Chris Goss Mark Lanegan	Josh Homme Troy Van Leeuwen Joey Castillo	Josh Homme Chris Goss	Era Vulgaris	2007	
"Run, Pig, Run"	Josh Homme Troy Van Leeuwen Joey Castillo Alain Johannes Chris Goss	Josh Homme Troy Van Leeuwen Joey Castillo	Josh Homme Chris Goss	Era Vulgaris	2007	
"Running Joke"	Josh Homme Troy Van Leeuwen Joey Castillo	Josh Homme Troy Van Leeuwen Joey Castillo	Josh Homme Chris Goss	Era Vulgaris (vinyl version)	2007	
"Sick, Sick, Sick" ‡	Josh Homme Troy Van Leeuwen Joey Castillo Chris Goss Julian Casablancas	Josh Homme Chris Goss Troy Van Leeuwen Joey Castillo	Josh Homme Chris Goss	Era Vulgaris	2007	
"Six Shooter"	Nick Oliveri Josh Homme Dave Grohl Dean Ween Alain Johannes Natasha Shneider	Josh Homme Nick Oliveri	Josh Homme Eric Valentine	Songs for the Deaf	2002	
"Skin on Skin"	Josh Homme Troy Van Leeuwen Joey Castillo Alain Johannes	Josh Homme Troy Van Leeuwen Joey Castillo	Josh Homme Joe Barresi	Lullabies to Paralyze	2005	
"The Sky Is Fallin'"	Josh Homme Nick Oliveri Dave Grohl	Josh Homme Nick Oliveri	Josh Homme Adam Kasper	Songs for the Deaf	2002	
"Smooth Sailing"	Josh Homme Troy Van Leeuwen Dean Fertita Michael Shuman Dave Grohl	Josh Homme Troy Van Leeuwen Dean Fertita Michael Shuman	Josh Homme Troy Van Leeuwen Dean Fertita Michael Shuman	...Like Clockwork	2013	
"Someone's in the Wolf"	Josh Homme Troy Van Leeuwen Joey Castillo Chris Goss Alain Johannes Jesse Hughes	Josh Homme Troy Van Leeuwen Joey Castillo	Josh Homme Joe Barresi	Lullabies to Paralyze	2005	
"A Song for the Dead"	Mark Lanegan Josh Homme Nick Oliveri Dave Grohl	Josh Homme Mark Lanegan	Josh Homme Eric Valentine	Songs for the Deaf	2002	
"A Song for the Deaf"	Josh Homme Mark Lanegan Nick Oliveri Dave Grohl	Josh Homme Nick Oliveri Mark Lanegan	Josh Homme Eric Valentine	Songs for the Deaf	2002	
"Spiders and Vinegaroons"	Josh Homme Vic "The Stick" Indrizzo Chris Goss	Josh Homme	Josh Homme Chris Goss	Kyuss / Queens of the Stone Age	1997	
"Suture Up Your Future"	Josh Homme Troy Van Leeuwen Joey Castillo Chris Goss	Josh Homme Troy Van Leeuwen Joey Castillo	Josh Homme Chris Goss	Era Vulgaris	2007	
"Tangled Up in Plaid"	Josh Homme Troy Van Leeuwen Joey Castillo Alain Johannes Joe Barresi	Josh Homme Troy Van Leeuwen Joey Castillo Mark Lanegan	Josh Homme Joe Barresi	Lullabies to Paralyze	2005	
"Tension Head"	Nick Oliveri Joshua Homme Gene Trautmann	Josh Homme Nick Oliveri	Josh Homme Chris Goss	Rated R	2000	
"These Aren't the Droids You're Looking For"	Josh Homme Alfredo Hernández	Josh Homme	Joe Barresi	The Split CD	1998	
"This Lullaby"	Mark Lanegan Josh Homme	Josh Homme Troy Van Leeuwen Joey Castillo	Josh Homme Joe Barresi	Lullabies to Paralyze	2005	
"Turnin' on the Screw"	Josh Homme Troy Van Leeuwen Joey Castillo Chris Goss Alain Johannes	Josh Homme Troy Van Leeuwen Joey Castillo	Josh Homme Chris Goss	Era Vulgaris	2007	
"Un-Reborn Again"	Josh Homme Troy Van Leeuwen Dean Fertita Michael Shuman Jon Theodore	Josh Homme Troy Van Leeuwen Dean Fertita Michael Shuman Jon Theodore	Mark Ronson Mark Rankin	Villains	2017	
"The Vampyre of Time and Memory"	Josh Homme Troy Van Leeuwen Dean Fertita Michael Shuman Joey Castillo	Josh Homme Troy Van Leeuwen Dean Fertita Michael Shuman	Josh Homme Troy Van Leeuwen Dean Fertita Michael Shuman	...Like Clockwork	2013	
"Villains of Circumstance"	Josh Homme Troy Van Leeuwen Dean Fertita Michael Shuman Jon Theodore	Josh Homme Troy Van Leeuwen Dean Fertita Michael Shuman Jon Theodore	Mark Ronson Mark Rankin	Villains	2017	
"Wake Up Screaming" (Subhumans cover)	Josh Homme Nick Oliveri Troy Van Leeuwen Joey Castillo	Subhumans †	Josh Homme Nick Oliveri Troy Van Leeuwen Joey Castillo Alain Johannes	Stone Age Complication	2003	
"Walkin' on the Sidewalks"	Josh Homme Alfredo Hernández	Josh Homme Alfredo Hernández	Josh Homme Joe Barresi	Queens of the Stone Age	1998	
"The Way You Used to Do" ‡	Josh Homme Troy Van Leeuwen Dean Fertita Michael Shuman Jon Theodore	Josh Homme Troy Van Leeuwen Dean Fertita Michael Shuman Jon Theodore	Mark Ronson Mark Rankin	Villains	2017	
"Where The Goth Girls At?"‡	Josh Homme Troy Van Leeuwen Dean Fertita Michael Shuman Jon Theodore Daphne Chen Eric Gorfain Leah Katz Richard Dodd	Josh Homme Troy Van Leeuwen Dean Fertita Michael Shuman Jon Theodore	Josh Homme Michael Shuman	Perfecth	2026	
"Who'll Be the Next in Line" (The Kinks cover)	Nick Oliveri Josh Homme Brendon McNichol Gene Trautmann Natasha Schneider	Ray Davies †	Alain Johannes	Rated R (UK special edition)	2000	
"You Can't Quit Me Baby"	Josh Homme Alfredo Hernández	Josh Homme Alfredo Hernández	Josh Homme Joe Barresi	Queens of the Stone Age	1998	
""You Got a Killer Scene There, Man...""	Josh Homme Troy Van Leeuwen Joey Castillo Alain Johannes	Josh Homme Troy Van Leeuwen Joey Castillo	Josh Homme Joe Barresi	Lullabies to Paralyze	2005	
"You Think I Ain't Worth a Dollar, But I Feel Like a Millionaire"	Nick Oliveri Josh Homme Gene Trautmann	Josh Homme Mario Lalli #	Josh Homme Eric Valentine	Songs for the Deaf	2002	
"You Would Know"	Josh Homme Alfredo Hernández Chris Goss	Josh Homme Alfredo Hernández	Josh Homme Joe Barresi	Queens of the Stone Age	1998	
"You're So Vague"	Josh Homme Nick Oliveri Dave Catching Gene Trautmann	Josh Homme Nick Oliveri	Alain Johannes	Rated R (UK special edition)	2000	
