= Villains World Tour =

2017–18 concert tour by Queens of the Stone Age

- Tour by Queens of the Stone Age
- Associated album: Villains
- Start date: June 22, 2017
- End date: September 12, 2018
- Legs: 11

Queens of the Stone Age concert chronology
- ...Like Clockwork Tour (2013–2014); Villains World Tour (2017–2018); The End Is Nero World Tour (2023–2025)

The Villains World Tour was a concert tour by American rock band Queens of the Stone Age to support the band's seventh studio album, Villains, which was released in August 2017. The tour began in the U.S. on June 22, 2017, and ended in Australia on September 12, 2018. English rock band Royal Blood supported Queens of the Stone Age on the North American leg of the tour.

== Tour dates ==
Date	City	Country	Venue	Opening act
Leg 1: North America
22 June 2017	Niagara Falls	United States	The Rapids Theatre	
24 June 2017	Montebello	Canada	Amnesia Rockfest	
Leg 2: Oceania/Japan
13 July 2017	Auckland	New Zealand	Logan Campbell Centre	
16 July 2017	Darwin	Australia	Convention Centre	
19 July 2017	Sydney	Australia	Hordern Pavilion	
20 July 2017	Melbourne	Australia	Festival Hall	
22 July 2017	Byron Bay	Australia	Splendour in the Grass	
28 July 2017	Yuzawa	Japan	Fuji Rock Festival	
Leg 3 - Europe
25 August 2017	Leeds	England	Leeds Festival	
25 August 2017	Reading	England	Reading Festival	
Leg 4 - North America
6 September 2017	Port Chester	United States	Capitol Theatre	Royal Blood
7 September 2017	Philadelphia	United States	Festival Pier at Penn's Landing	Royal Blood
9 September 2017	Toronto	Canada	Budweiser Stage	Royal Blood
10 September 2017	Grand Rapids	United States	20 Monroe Live	Royal Blood
12 September 2017	Columbus	United States	Express Live!	Royal Blood
13 September 2017	Pittsburgh	United States	Stage AE	Royal Blood
15 September 2017	Cleveland	United States	Agora Theatre and Ballroom	Royal Blood
16 September 2017	Chicago	United States	Riot Fest	
7 October 2017	San Bernardino	United States	Glen Helen Regional Park	
9 October 2017	Salt Lake City	United States	The Great Saltair	Royal Blood
10 October 2017	Morrison	United States	Red Rocks Amphitheatre	Royal Blood
12 October 2017	St. Louis	United States	Peabody Opera House	Royal Blood
13 October 2017	Kansas City	United States	Crossroads KC	Royal Blood
14 October 2017	Saint Paul	United States	Roy Wilkins Auditorium	Royal Blood
15 October 2017	Milwaukee	United States	Eagles Ballroom	Royal Blood
17 October 2017	Detroit	United States	Fox Theatre	Royal Blood
18 October 2017	Indianapolis	United States	Murat Theatre	Royal Blood
20 October 2017	Washington, D.C.	United States	The Anthem	Royal Blood
21 October 2017	Boston	United States	Agganis Arena	Royal Blood
22 October 2017	Portland	United States	State Theatre	Royal Blood
24 October 2017	New York City	United States	Madison Square Garden	Royal Blood
Leg 5: Europe
4 November 2017	Bologna	Italy	Unipol Arena	Broncho
5 November 2017	Vienna	Austria	Wiener Stadthalle	Broncho
6 November 2017	Zürich	Switzerland	Samsung Hall	Broncho
7 November 2017	Paris	France	AccorHotels Arena	Broncho
9 November 2017	Oberhausen	Germany	König Pilsener Arena	Broncho
10 November 2017	Munich	Germany	Zenith	Broncho
11 November 2017	Berlin	Germany	Velodrom	Broncho
12 November 2017	Amsterdam	Netherlands	Ziggo Dome	Broncho
14 November 2017	Copenhagen	Denmark	TAP1	Broncho
15 November 2017	Hamburg	Germany	Sporthalle Hamburg	Broncho
16 November 2017	Antwerp	Belgium	Sportpaleis	Broncho
18 November 2017	London	United Kingdom	Wembley Arena	Broncho
19 November 2017	Manchester	United Kingdom	Manchester Arena	Broncho
21 November 2017	London	United Kingdom	The O_{2} Arena	Broncho
23 November 2017	Edinburgh	United Kingdom	Usher Hall	Broncho
24 November 2017	Dublin	Ireland	3Arena	Broncho
Leg 6: North America
22 January 2018	Victoria	Canada	Save on Foods Memorial Centre	Eagles of Death Metal
24 January 2018	Vancouver	Canada	Pacific Coliseum	Eagles of Death Metal
25 January 2018	Seattle	United States	KeyArena	Eagles of Death Metal
26 January 2018	Portland	United States	Veterans Coliseum	Eagles of Death Metal
27 January 2018	Eugene	United States	Hult Center for the Performing Arts	Eagles of Death Metal
29 January 2018	Fresno	United States	Selland Arena	Eagles of Death Metal
30 January 2018	Sacramento	United States	Memorial Auditorium	Eagles of Death Metal
1 February 2018	San Francisco	United States	Bill Graham Civic Auditorium	Eagles of Death Metal
16 February 2018	Las Vegas	United States	The Chelsea at The Cosmopolitan	Royal Blood
17 February 2018	Inglewood	United States	The Forum	Royal Blood
Leg 7: Latin America
21 February 2018	Santiago	Chile	Movistar Arena	Alain Johannes
25 February 2018	Rio de Janeiro	Brazil	Maracanã Stadium	Ego Kill Talent (supporting Foo Fighters)
27 February 2018	São Paulo	Brazil	Allianz Parque	Ego Kill Talent (supporting Foo Fighters)
28 February 2018	São Paulo	Brazil	Allianz Parque	Ego Kill Talent (supporting Foo Fighters)
2 March 2018	Curitiba	Brazil	Pedreira Paulo Leminski	Ego Kill Talent (supporting Foo Fighters)
4 March 2018	Porto Alegre	Brazil	Estádio Beira-Rio	Ego Kill Talent (supporting Foo Fighters)
7 March 2018	Buenos Aires	Argentina	Vélez Sársfield Stadium	Coya (supporting Foo Fighters)
10 March 2018	Bogotá	Colombia	Palacio de los Deportes	Los Makenzy
18 March 2018	Mexico City	Mexico	Vive Latino	
Leg 8: North America
21 March 2018	San Diego	United States	The Observatory North Park	Broncho
22 March 2018	San Diego	United States	The Observatory North Park	Broncho
23 March 2018	Tempe	United States	Innings Park	
25 March 2018	Houston	United States	In Bloom Music Festival	
28 March 2018	Honolulu	United States	The Republik	
29 March 2018	Honolulu	United States	The Republik	
21 April 2018	Monterrey	Mexico	Pal Norte	
24 April 2018	Austin	United States	Austin360 Amphitheater	Wolf Alice
25 April 2018	Irving	United States	The Pavilion at the Irving Music Factory	Wolf Alice
26 April 2018	Shreveport	United States	Municipal Auditorium	Wolf Alice
27 April 2018	New Orleans	United States	Saenger Theatre	Wolf Alice
29 April 2018	Jacksonville	United States	Welcome to Rockville	
1 May 2018	Miami	United States	Bayfront Park Amphitheater	Wolf Alice
2 May 2018	St. Petersburg	United States	Mahaffey Theater	Wolf Alice
4 May 2018	Memphis	United States	Beale Street Music Festival	
5 May 2018	Atlanta	United States	Shaky Knees Music Festival	
6 May 2018	Concord	United States	Carolina Rebellion	
17 May 2018	Calgary	Canada	Scotiabank Saddledome	Royal Blood
18 May 2018	Edmonton	Canada	Rogers Place	Royal Blood
19 May 2018 (rescheduled from 20)	Winnipeg	Canada	Bell MTS Place	Royal Blood
22 May 2018	Madison	United States	Breese Stevens Field	Royal Blood
24 May 2018	London	Canada	Budweiser Gardens	Royal Blood
25 May 2018	Rochester	United States	Rochester Dome Arena	Royal Blood
26 May 2018	Boston	United States	Boston Calling Music Festival	
Leg 9: Europe
8 June 2018	Aarhus	Denmark	Northside Festival	
9 June 2018	Gothenburg	Sweden	Liseberg	
10 June 2018	Stockholm	Sweden	Gröna Lund	
12 June 2018	Bergen	Norway	Bergenfest	
15 June 2018	Luxembourg		Rockhal	
16 June 2018	Wiesbaden	Germany	Open Air Im Kulturpark	
19 June 2018	Warsaw	Poland	Torwar Arena	
20 June 2018	Prague	Czech Republic	Karlin Forum	
21 June 2018	Budapest	Hungary	Budapest Park	
23 June 2018	Lucca	Italy	Lucca Summer Festival	
24 June 2018	Monza	Italy	I-Days Festival	
25 June 2018	Zagreb	Croatia	InMusic Festival	
27 June 2018	Dresden	Germany	Elbufer	
29 June 2018	Beuningen	Netherlands	Down the Rabbit Hole	
30 June 2018	London	United Kingdom	Finsbury Park	Iggy Pop; Run the Jewels; The Hives; Miles Kane; Deap Vally; Black Honey
3 July 2018	Cornwall	United Kingdom	Eden Sessions	
5 July 2018	Werchter	Belgium	Rock Werchter	
6 July 2018	Arras	France	Main Square Festival	
7 July 2018	Belfort	France	Eurockeennes Festival	
8 July 2018	Montreux	Switzerland	Montreux Jazz Festival	
11 July 2018	Barcelona	Spain	Razzmatazz	
13 July 2018	Lisbon	Portugal	NOS Alive	
14 July 2018	Madrid	Spain	Mad Cool Festival	
Leg 10: Asia
16 August 2018	Tokyo	Japan	Studio Coast	
18 August 2018	Tokyo	Japan	Summer Sonic Festival	
Leg 11: Oceania
23 August 2018	Auckland	New Zealand	Spark Arena	C.W. Stoneking
25 August 2018	Christchurch	New Zealand	Horncastle Arena	C.W. Stoneking
28 August 2018	Brisbane	Australia	Riverstage	C.W. Stoneking
30 August 2018	Newcastle	Australia	Newcastle Entertainment Centre	C.W. Stoneking; The Chats
31 August 2018	Sydney	Australia	Hordern Pavilion	C.W. Stoneking; The Chats
1 September 2018	Sydney	Australia	Hordern Pavilion	C.W. Stoneking; The Chats
4 September 2018	Hobart	Australia	Derwent Entertainment Centre	C.W. Stoneking; The Chats
7 September 2018	Melbourne	Australia	Margaret Court Arena	C.W. Stoneking; The Chats
8 September 2018	Melbourne	Australia	Margaret Court Arena	C.W. Stoneking; The Chats
9 September 2018	Adelaide	Australia	Adelaide Entertainment Centre	C.W. Stoneking; The Chats
12 September 2018	Perth	Australia	RAC Arena	C.W. Stoneking; The Chats

== Songs performed ==
Queens of the Stone Age

- "Regular John"
- "Avon"
- "How to Handle a Rope"
- "Mexicola"
- "You Can't Quit Me Baby"

Rated R

- "Feel Good Hit of the Summer"
- "The Lost Art of Keeping a Secret"
- "Leg of Lamb"
- "Monsters in the Parasol"
- "In The Fade"
- "I Think I Lost My Headache"

Songs for the Deaf

- "You Think I Ain't Worth a Dollar, But I Feel Like a Millionaire"
- "No One Knows"
- "First It Giveth"
- "A Song for the Dead"
- "Hangin' Tree"
- "Go with the Flow"
- "Do It Again"
- "A Song for the Deaf"

Lullabies to Paralyze

- "Everybody Knows That You Are Insane"
- "Tangled Up in Plaid"
- "Burn the Witch"
- "In My Head"
- "Little Sister"
- "I Never Came"

Era Vulgaris

- "Turnin' on the Screw"
- "Sick, Sick, Sick"
- "Misfit Love"
- "Make It wit Chu"
- "3's & 7's"

...Like Clockwork

- "Keep Your Eyes Peeled"
- "I Sat by the Ocean"
- "The Vampyre of Time and Memory"
- "If I Had a Tail"
- "My God is the Sun"
- "Kalopsia"
- "Smooth Sailing"
- "I Appear Missing"

Villains

- "Feet Don't Fail Me"
- "The Way You Used to Do"
- "Domesticated Animals"
- "Fortress"
- "Head Like a Haunted House"
- "Un-Reborn Again"
- "The Evil Has Landed"
- "Villains of Circumstance"
