= ...Like Cologne =

Live album / EP by Queens of the Stone Age
- Released: November 22, 2013
- Recorded: September 4, 2013
- Venues: Kulturkirche (Cologne, Germany)
- Genres: Alternative rock; art rock; acoustic
- Length: 14:06
- Label: Matador

Queens of the Stone Age chronology
...Like Clockwork (2013)	...Like Cologne (2013)	Villains (2017)

...Like Cologne is a live EP release by American rock band Queens of the Stone Age. It was released on November 22, 2013, exclusively on Spotify.

The EP features live acoustic versions of three tracks, recorded on September 4, 2013 at the Kulturkirche in Cologne, Germany. The tracks include "Long Slow Goodbye", from 2005's Lullabies to Paralyze, and "The Vampyre of Time and Memory" and "I Sat by the Ocean" from 2013's ...Like Clockwork.

== Track listing ==
No.	Title	Album	Length
1.	"Long Slow Goodbye"	Lullabies to Paralyze	5:39
2.	"The Vampyre of Time and Memory"	...Like Clockwork	3:51
3.	"I Sat by the Ocean"	...Like Clockwork	4:36
Total length:			14:06

== Personnel ==
- Josh Homme – vocals, guitar, piano
- Troy Van Leeuwen – guitars, backing vocals, keyboards
- Dean Fertita – keyboards, guitars, backing vocals, piano, church organ
- Michael Shuman – bass, backing vocals
- Jon Theodore – drums, percussion
