= Smooth Sailing (Queens of the Stone Age song) =

Promotional single by Queens of the Stone Age

from the album ...Like Clockwork
- Released: February 27, 2014
- Recorded: August 9, 2012 – March 9, 2013
- Studio: Pink Duck Studios (Burbank, California)
- Genre: Funk rock; hard rock
- Length: 4:51
- Label: Matador; Rekords Rekords
- Songwriter: Queens of the Stone Age
- Producer: Queens of the Stone Age

"Smooth Sailing" is a song by American rock band Queens of the Stone Age from their sixth studio album ...Like Clockwork. It was released as a promotional single on February 27, 2014. Dave Grohl (Foo Fighters, Nirvana) recorded drums on this track for the album.

== Music video ==
The music video, directed by Hiro Murai, was released on April 4, 2014. It shows frontman Josh Homme as a businessman who joins a group of Japanese businessmen on a night in the city filled with alcohol, drugs, strippers, and karaoke. At one point, they beat up a man and steal his sports car for a joyride. One of the businessmen separates from the group and hallucinates that people around him are demonic creatures with light coming from their eyes and mouths, and he kills them before the other businessmen find him. The video ends in the desert, with Homme and the other businessmen watching their associate bury the bodies of the people he killed as the sun rises.

== Personnel ==
Queens of the Stone Age

- Joshua Homme – vocals, lead guitar, frog, looper
- Troy Van Leeuwen – guitar, claps
- Michael Shuman – vocals, bass, claps, shaker, claves
- Dean Fertita – guitar

Additional musician

- Dave Grohl – drums

Technical personnel

- Joshua Homme & Queens of the Stone Age – production
- Mark Rankin – engineering, mixing
- Alain Johannes – additional engineering
- Justin Smith – additional engineering
- Gavin Lurssen – mastering

== Chart positions ==
Chart (2014)	Peak position
Canada Rock (Billboard)	50
US Mainstream Rock (Billboard)	32
