= My God Is the Sun =

Single by Queens of the Stone Age

from the album ...Like Clockwork
- Released: April 8, 2013
- Recorded: 2012–13
- Genre: Alternative rock; hard rock; desert rock
- Length: 3:55 (album version); 3:39 (radio edit)
- Label: Matador
- Songwriters: Josh Homme; Troy Van Leeuwen; Michael Shuman; Dean Fertita
- Producers: Josh Homme; Troy Van Leeuwen; Michael Shuman; Dean Fertita

Queens of the Stone Age singles chronology
"Make It wit Chu" (2007)	"My God Is the Sun" (2013)	"I Sat by the Ocean" (2013)

"My God Is the Sun" is the first single by Queens of the Stone Age from their sixth studio album, ...Like Clockwork (2013). The band debuted the song at Lollapalooza Brazil on March 30, 2013. The studio version of the single debuted on BBC Radio 1 on April 8, 2013, and became available for download with preorders of the album.

In December 2013, the song was nominated for a Grammy Award in the category Best Rock Performance. Although the song did not win, it was played as the closer for the show. However, their performance (which was in collaboration with Dave Grohl, Lindsey Buckingham, and Nine Inch Nails) was cut short, and the credits and advertisements ran over top the performance. This has created an uproar from the performers, particularly Trent Reznor, criticizing the event for cheating them.

== Release ==
Queens of the Stone Age debuted "My God Is the Sun" at Lollapalooza in São Paulo, Brazil, on March 30, 2013. That performance was also the first for Jon Theodore as the band's new drummer. Dave Grohl recorded drums on this track for the album.

The studio version of "My God is the Sun" premiered on Zane Lowe's radio show on BBC Radio 1 on April 8, 2013. By preordering the album from Matador Records or iTunes, listeners could receive the single as a download that day.

On May 17, a video for "My God is the Sun" was released. It is the first full-length video to be released for this album, complementing partial-length videos for "I Appear Missing", "Kalopsia", "Keep Your Eyes Peeled" and "If I Had a Tail".

The song appeared in the documentary Warren Miller's Free Ticket to Ride and is available as a playable track in Rock Band 4 and in Rocksmith 2014 as downloadable content.

== Reviews ==
Rolling Stone reported that the song presented as a "heavy track featur[ing] meaty bass, a needling guitar assault and spiraling drums over Josh Homme's vocal battle cry." Kevin Perry of NME wrote that "the arrival of 'My God Is The Sun' feels like a moment. It shrugs off any weight of expectation it might have felt from the moment it opens with the shake of a maraca, always a sure sign that a band is here for a good time. The track that roars forth is as ferocious as we'd hoped it would be, all driving riffs beneath Josh Homme's unmistakable croon."

== Personnel ==
Queens of the Stone Age

- Joshua Homme – lead vocals, lead guitar, percussion
- Troy Van Leeuwen – twelve–string guitar, Moog synthesizer, backing vocals, percussion
- Michael Shuman – bass, backing vocals, percussion
- Dean Fertita – guitar

Additional musician

- Dave Grohl – drums

Technical personnel

- Joshua Homme & Queens of the Stone Age – production
- Mark Rankin – engineering, mixing
- Alain Johannes – additional engineering
- Justin Smith – additional engineering
- Gavin Lurssen – mastering

== Charts ==
Chart (2013)	Peak position
Belgium (Ultratop 50 Flanders)	37
Ireland (IRMA)	92
US Regional Mexican Airplay (Billboard)	32
Netherlands (Single Top 100)	77
UK Streaming (OCC)	74
US Alternative Airplay (Billboard)	17
US Mainstream Rock (Billboard)	37
