= In Times New Roman... =

Studio album by Queens of the Stone Age
- Released: June 16, 2023
- Studios: Pink Duck (Burbank); Shangri-La (Malibu); Dumbfox Studios; Readymade Studio (Paris); The Tempermill (Ferndale)
- Genres: Alternative rock; stoner rock
- Length: 47:37
- Label: Matador
- Producer: Queens of the Stone Age

Queens of the Stone Age chronology
| Villains (2017) | In Times New Roman... (2023) | Alive in the Catacombs (2025) |

Singles from In Times New Roman...
- 1. "Emotion Sickness" Released: May 11, 2023; 2. "Carnavoyeur" Released: May 31, 2023; 3. "Paper Machete" Released: June 14, 2023

In Times New Roman... is the eighth studio album by American rock band Queens of the Stone Age, released on June 16, 2023, through Matador Records. It was announced in a video teaser on May 9, 2023, and is the band's first album since Villains (2017). The announcement occurred alongside the release of the lead single, "Emotion Sickness". In Times New Roman... marks the conclusion of the band's first trilogy of albums released through Matador that began with ...Like Clockwork (2013) and continued with Villains.

== Recording ==
The band produced the album with mixing handled by Mark Rankin, and recorded it at frontman Josh Homme's Pink Duck Studios in Burbank, California, as well as at Rick Rubin's Shangri-La studio in Malibu, California.

In an interview with NME ahead of the album's release, Homme spoke on how life events had an influence on the recording of In Times New Roman...:

"I think when you're dealing with the extreme ups and downs of life, you don't stop and go: 'I should really make a record.' Those things don't exist in that moment. If your roof is flooding, you don't say: 'We should make a record about this!' You have to stop yourself drowning in a flood. We recorded it probably two-and-a-half years ago, but it just sat there waiting to be finished. I didn't sing it until last November. I wasn't done living. Honestly, I was probably afraid. I wasn't ready. You need the flood to be over, and then you can decide whether you can accept the flood. I think with this being a record about acceptance, you need to actually get there yourself."

== Critical reception ==
Professional ratings
Aggregate scores
| Source | Rating |
|---|---|
| AnyDecentMusic? | 7.0/10 |
| Metacritic | 80/100 |
Review scores
| Source | Rating |
| AllMusic | 4.5/5 stars |
| Classic Rock | 4/5 stars |
| The Daily Telegraph | 4/5 stars |
| Exclaim! | 7/10 |
| The Independent | 3/5 stars |
| Kerrang! | 4/5 stars |
| Louder Sound | 2.5/5 stars |
| NME | 4/5 stars |
| Pitchfork | 6.8/10 |
| Sputnikmusic | 3.7/5 |

In Times New Roman... received a score of 80 out of 100 on review aggregator Metacritic based on 19 critics' reviews, indicating "generally favorable" reception. Thomas Smith of NME described In Times New Roman... as "a grotty listen, using pain to encourage a rawness in their sound that's been absent since 2007's Era Vulgaris" and felt that "with enough fan-service for the die-hards; this is up there with their darkest, knottiest material to date, and will be appreciated all the more for it". Fred Barrett of Slant Magazine wrote that while the album "abandons the glossy dance-rock of its predecessor, it doesn't do so in favor of exploring new styles, sounds, or textures". Barrett found that the album's highlights "prove that Queens of the Stone Age can still reliably deliver left-of-center alt-rock thrills [...] but after almost three decades of taking on every strand of rock music and embracing both the analog and the digital, it's disheartening, if perhaps understandable, that the band seems unsure of where to go next."

Reviewing the album for Exclaim!, Spencer Nafekh-Blanchette wrote that "the band has moved away from their roots in some regards, but remain completely the same in others", elaborating that "the new LP takes their unique alternative rock to new dimensions, swapping uptempo rock n' roll jolts for a slow-yet-unnerving new groove. It's an album that's sure to please all listeners, but only truly satisfy real fans of the band." Simon K. of Sputnikmusic opined that the band have "delivered something very familiar, but with just enough new things in it to make it somewhat fresh" and that the album "seems to trade in peaks and troughs for steadfast songwriting", despite finding that there are no "top-tier tracks you could stick on the quintessential Queens playlist".

Writing for Pitchfork, Zach Schonfeld called it the band's "heaviest, angriest work since 2007's underrated Era Vulgaris", and felt that "Homme chips away the chrome-plated dance-rock machinations of 2017's Mark Ronson-produced Villains and tries to restore the band to a bluesy primitivity". Schonfeld also remarked that the album's "most compelling tracks deepen the anger with flashes of humor and wry introspection" and its "best songs [...] are hiding in the back half".

== Track listing ==
All lyrics are written by Josh Homme; all music is composed by Homme, Dean Fertita, Michael Shuman, Jon Theodore, Troy Van Leeuwen.

In Times New Roman... track listing
| No. | Title | Length |
|---|---|---|
| 1. | "Obscenery" | 4:23 |
| 2. | "Paper Machete" | 3:22 |
| 3. | "Negative Space" | 3:53 |
| 4. | "Time & Place" | 4:26 |
| 5. | "Made to Parade" | 5:18 |
| 6. | "Carnavoyeur" | 3:56 |
| 7. | "What the Peephole Say" | 4:06 |
| 8. | "Sicily" | 4:41 |
| 9. | "Emotion Sickness" | 4:31 |
| 10. | "Straight Jacket Fitting" | 9:01 |
| Total length: | | 47:37 |

== Personnel ==
Queens of the Stone Age

- Josh Homme – lead vocals, electric guitar (all tracks), percussion (1–3, 8, 9), production, engineering
- Dean Fertita – electric guitar (1–4, 9–10), keyboards (4–9), percussion (10)
- Michael Shuman – bass guitar (all tracks), backing vocals (2), percussion (9)
- Jon Theodore – drums (all tracks)
- Troy Van Leeuwen – electric guitar (all tracks)

Additional musicians

- Richard Dodd – cello (tracks 1, 6, 8, 10)
- Leah Katz – viola (1, 6, 8, 10)
- Daphne Chen – violin (1, 6, 8, 10)
- Eric Gorfain – violin (1, 6, 8, 10)
- Nina McCoy – additional vocals (1)
- Sharetta Morgan-Harmon – additional vocals (1)
- Tenderlie Lavender – additional vocals (1)
- Matt Helders – additional vocals (9)

Technical

- Gavin Lurssen – mastering
- Reuben Cohen – mastering
- Mark Rankin – mixing, engineering
- Justin Smith – engineering
- Robert Stevenson – engineering
- Greg White – engineering assistance
- Davey Latter – drum technician
- Salar Rajabnik – guitar technician, keyboard technician
- Wayne Faler – guitar technician, keyboard technician
- Matt Zivich – guitar technician
- Brendan Benson – additional engineering (4)
- David Feeny – additional engineering (10)

Visuals

- Boneface – artwork

== Charts ==
=== Weekly charts ===
Weekly chart performance for In Times New Roman...
| Chart (2023–2025) | Peak position |
|---|---|
| Australian Albums (ARIA) | 2 |
| Austrian Albums (Ö3 Austria) | 1 |
| Belgian Albums (Ultratop Flanders) | 1 |
| Belgian Albums (Ultratop Wallonia) | 1 |
| Canadian Albums (Billboard) | 30 |
| Croatian International Albums (HDU) | 3 |
| Danish Albums (Hitlisten) | 17 |
| Dutch Albums (Album Top 100) | 1 |
| Finnish Albums (Suomen virallinen lista) | 8 |
| French Albums (SNEP) | 7 |
| German Albums (Offizielle Top 100) | 2 |
| Hungarian Albums (MAHASZ) | 31 |
| Irish Albums (IRMA) | 3 |
| Italian Albums (FIMI) | 17 |
| Japanese Albums (Oricon) | 45 |
| Japanese Hot Albums (Billboard) | 51 |
| New Zealand Albums (RMNZ) | 1 |
| Norwegian Albums (VG-lista) | 18 |
| Polish Albums (ZPAV) | 3 |
| Portuguese Albums (AFP) | 2 |
| Scottish Albums (Official Charts) | 2 |
| Spanish Albums (Promusicae) | 5 |
| Swedish Albums (Sverigetopplistan) | 19 |
| Swiss Albums (Schweizer Hitparade) | 2 |
| UK Albums (Official Charts) | 2 |
| UK Independent Albums (Official Charts) | 1 |
| UK Rock & Metal Albums (Official Charts) | 1 |
| US Billboard 200 | 9 |
| US Top Rock Albums (Billboard) | 1 |
| US Top Hard Rock Albums (Billboard) | 1 |

=== Year-end charts ===
2023 year-end chart performance for In Times New Roman...
| Chart (2023) | Position |
|---|---|
| Belgian Albums (Ultratop Flanders) | 79 |
| US Top Current Album Sales (Billboard) | 83 |
| US Top Alternative Albums (Billboard) | 49 |
| US Top Hard Rock Albums (Billboard) | 42 |

2025 year-end chart performance for In Times New Roman...
| Chart (2025) | Position |
|---|---|
| Croatian International Albums (HDU) | 37 |
