= Hello=Fire =

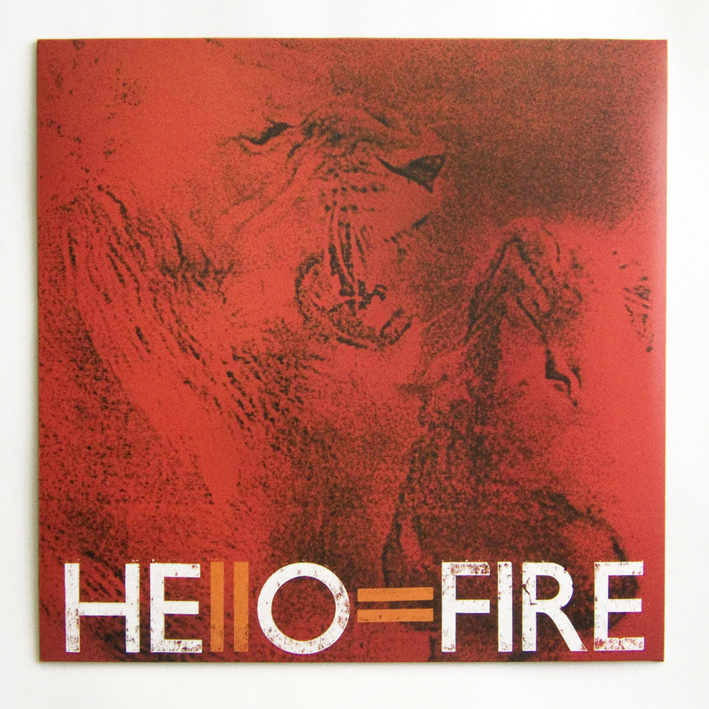

Studio album by Hello=Fire
- Released: October 26, 2009
- Genres: Indie rock, alternative rock
- Length: 40:28
- Label: Schnitzel Records Ltd.
- Producers: Dean Fertita, Brendan Benson

Dean Fertita chronology
Horehound (2009)	Hello=Fire (2009)	Sea of Cowards (2009)

Hello=Fire is the debut album of Dean Fertita's solo project with the same name. The album was recorded at various studios while Fertita was on tour with Queens of the Stone Age. The album features guest appearances by band members from Queens of the Stone Age, Brendan Benson who also produced the album as well as The Afghan Whigs drummer Michael Horrigan. The album was released October 26, 2009 by Schnitzel Records Ltd. "Nature Of Our Minds" was released as its first single.

== Track listing ==
All tracks written by Dean Fertita except where noted.

No.	Title	Writer(s)	Length
1.	"Certain Circles"	Fertita, Brendan Benson	3:20
2.	"Far From It"	Fertita, Benson	3:26
3.	"She Gets Remote"	Fertita, Benson	3:00
4.	"Mirror Each Other"		3:30
5.	"Nature Of Our Minds"		2:58
6.	"She's Mine In Sorrow"		3:09
7.	"Faint Notion"		3:46
8.	"Someplace Spacious"	Fertita, Benson	3:13
9.	"Looking Daggers"		2:01
10.	"I Wanna Like You"	Fertita, Benson	3:08
11.	"They Wear Lightning"		3:30
12.	"Parallel"	Fertita, Benson	5:22

== Personnel ==
Mixed by Dave Feeny, Tempermill Studio

Recorded by:

- Brendan Benson - East Grand Studio
- Bryan Hanna - Terrarium Studio
- Dave Feeny - Tempermill Studio
- Norm Block - Happy Ending Studio
- Eldad Guetta - Shriek Studio, London

Performed by:

- Dean Fertita - vocals, guitar, keyboard
- Brendan Benson - bass, vocals, guitar
- Michael Horrigan - drums
- Joey Castillo - drums
- Troy Van Leeuwen - bass
- Michael Shuman - bass, vocals

Design - Tal Brosh
