= Villains (Queens of the Stone Age album) =

Studio album by Queens of the Stone Age
- Released: August 25, 2017
- Recorded: January–March 2017
- Studio: United Recording Studios (Los Angeles) Pink Duck (Burbank)
- Genres: Alternative rock; hard rock; dance-rock; stoner rock; boogie rock
- Length: 48:00
- Label: Matador
- Producer: Mark Ronson

Queens of the Stone Age chronology
| ...Like Cologne (2013) | Villains (2017) | In Times New Roman... (2023) |

Singles from Villains
- 1. "The Way You Used to Do" Released: June 15, 2017; 2. "The Evil Has Landed" Released: August 10, 2017

Villains is the seventh studio album by American rock band Queens of the Stone Age. Produced by Mark Ronson, it was released on August 25, 2017, through Matador Records. The album was announced on June 14, 2017, with a teaser trailer taking the form of a comedy skit featuring the band performing a polygraph test with Liam Lynch. The first single, "The Way You Used to Do", was released the following day along with the announcement of a world tour. Villains is the first Queens of the Stone Age album to not feature any special guest musicians, the second to not feature Mark Lanegan, and the first to feature drummer Jon Theodore as a full-time member of the band. Villains is the second installment in the band's first trilogy of albums released through Matador that began with ...Like Clockwork (2013) and concluded with In Times New Roman... (2023).

The album received widely positive reviews and performed well commercially, debuting at number one on the UK Albums Chart, earning the band their first UK number-one album, and number three on the US Billboard 200. It also topped Billboard's Top Alternative Albums and Top Rock Albums charts. At the 2018 Grammy Awards, it was nominated for Best Rock Album, losing to The War on Drugs' A Deeper Understanding.

== Background and recording ==
Several of the songs from the album were previewed in some form prior to its release. The album's final track, "Villains of Circumstance", was first premiered by Josh Homme in 2014 at an acoustic concert for James Lavelle's Meltdown Festival, while "The Evil Has Landed" was performed by the band during their first gig of 2017 on June 22 at The Rapids Theatre in Niagara Falls, New York. "The Evil Has Landed" was released as a single on August 10, 2017. In addition to this, several snippets of songs have been featured in teaser trailers released online in promotion of the album, including a short clip of the album's opening track, "Feet Don't Fail Me", as well as an a cappella from the intro to the same song.

The album has been described as "a little looser and more uptempo" than their last release ...Like Clockwork and "more carefree". Homme cites his interest in dancing, working with Mark Ronson, and Ronson's collaboration with Bruno Mars "Uptown Funk" for the direction of the album. Kory Grow of Rolling Stone notes, "While the guitars still have the limber crunch of Queens albums past, they're playing around easy-breezy disco beats and chilly synths on songs like 'Feet Don't Fail Me' and 'Un-Reborn Again.'" The song "Un-Reborn Again" was seen as a nod to T. Rex by critics, with the lyrics "Scaredy nose Jack/ Scaredy nose Jack/ Knowing nothing about nothing" echoing T. Rex's "Telegram Sam" with the lines "Golden Nose Slim/ Golden Nose Slim/ I knows where you’ve been", a T. Rex influence that Homme mentioned during the promotion of the album.

== Artwork ==
The cover art for Villains was designed by graphic artist Boneface, who designed the artwork for Queens of the Stone Age's previous album, ...Like Clockwork. It was the first time that the band had returned to an artist to request artwork on a subsequent album. In an interview with Juxtapoz magazine, Boneface talked about returning to create a cover for the album and his working relationship with Homme. In the article he stated that, "Returning was honestly a pretty daunting task. People seemed to like all the artwork I did for the last album, so I felt I had something to live up to. Also, the fact that QOTSA tend to use a different artist for each album cover made it kind of special that they decided to use me again. I think Josh likened our relationship to Hunter S. Thompson and Ralph Steadman in the initial rallying call. So after I’d decided to plunge back into the QOTSA jacuzzi, I started work the way I usually do, just trying to create something cool. I did a bunch of preliminary drawings before I’d heard any new songs or we’d even talk about the album, and one of those sketches actually ended up being the basis for the album cover." Each band member was given their own artwork, with Homme's on the front cover, and the rest of the band members on the back. An alternate vinyl cover that was released exclusively through independent record stores had a light blue tint over the image, gave Josh Homme a bloody nose, and the devil behind Homme giving two middle fingers.

== Reception ==
=== Commercial performance ===
In the Billboard charting week of September 3, 2017, Villains was the No. 3 album on the Billboard 200 upon its first week of release, selling 73,000 equivalent units, and 69,000 in traditional album sales. It was also the best selling album of the week, starting at No. 1 on the Top Album Sales chart. Likewise, it peaked at #1 in the UK Albums Chart, becoming the first Queens of the Stone Age's #1 album in the country.

=== Critical reception ===
Professional ratings
Aggregate scores
| Source | Rating |
|---|---|
| AnyDecentMusic? | 7.6/10 |
| Metacritic | 81/100 |
Review scores
| Source | Rating |
| AllMusic | 4/5 stars |
| The A.V. Club | B |
| The Guardian | 4/5 stars |
| The Independent | 4/5 stars |
| Mojo | 4/5 stars |
| NME | 4/5 stars |
| Pitchfork | 6.9/10 |
| Q | 4/5 stars |
| Rolling Stone | 4/5 stars |
| Uncut | 8/10 |

Villains received widespread acclaim from music critics. At Metacritic, which assigns a normalized rating out of 100 to reviews from mainstream critics, the album has an average score of 81 based on 30 reviews, indicating 'universal acclaim'.

Giving the album four out of five, AllMusic editor Stephen Thomas Erlewine claimed that "At this stage, Queens of the Stone Age don't have many new tricks in their bag, but their consummate skill -- accentuated by the fact that this is the first QOTSA album that features just the band alone, not even augmented by Mark Lanegan -- means they know when to ratchet up the tempo, when to slide into a mechanical grind, and when to sharpen hooks so they puncture cleanly. All that makes Villains a dark joy, a record that offers visceral pleasure in its winking menace." In his review for Rolling Stone, Will Hermes wrote, "Queens of the Stone Age always sounded like the best glam-band name ever, and while Josh Homme's free-ranging heavy rock hypnotists were never quite that, they come as close as ever on Villains."

In a more reserved review for Pitchfork, contributor Zoe Camp concluded that, "Villains isn’t always so smooth and several sections fall flat, like the staccato-spiked funk that surfaces midway through “The Evil Has Landed” or the melodically static refrains on “Fortress.” Nevertheless, the stalled moments don't detract from the fun of the ride. Queens’ final destination is what matters—and a beeline into the unknown sure beats another go at the merry-go-round. Villains reaffirms what makes this band so special to begin with: their willingness to blow up the status quo as established by their riff-rock brethren, and even themselves."

Amongst the most critical reviews was an article by Will Butler for Under the Radar. In the review, Butler claimed "It'll be of concern to Queens purists that Villains pulls from sounds that expired a decade ago and beyond. Dwelling on better times of a bygone era is a fundamental pillar of escapism, but it's disconcerting when one of the most uncompromising, forward-thinking bands in the rock pantheon leans so heavily on what worked in the past that they forget that the onus is on them to innovate."

=== Accolades ===
| Publication | Accolade | Year | Rank | Ref. |
|---|---|---|---|---|
| Classic Rock | Classic Rock Magazine's 50 Albums of 2017 | 2017 | 1 | |
| Mojo | Mojo's Top 50 Albums of 2017 | 2017 | 3 | |
| NME | NME's Albums of the Year 2017 | 2017 | 35 | |
| Rolling Stone | 50 Best Albums of 2017 | 2017 | 8 | |
| Rough Trade | Albums of the Year | 2017 | 21 | |
| Entertainment Weekly | The 25 Best Albums of 2017 | 2017 | 25 | |
| Rolling Stone | Readers' Poll: 10 Best Albums of 2017 | 2017 | 9 | |

== Track listing ==
All lyrics are written by Josh Homme; all music is composed by Queens of the Stone Age.

| No. | Title | Length |
|---|---|---|
| 1. | "Feet Don't Fail Me" | 5:41 |
| 2. | "The Way You Used to Do" | 4:34 |
| 3. | "Domesticated Animals" | 5:20 |
| 4. | "Fortress" | 5:27 |
| 5. | "Head Like a Haunted House" | 3:21 |
| 6. | "Un-Reborn Again" | 6:40 |
| 7. | "Hideaway" | 4:18 |
| 8. | "The Evil Has Landed" | 6:30 |
| 9. | "Villains of Circumstance" | 6:09 |
| Total length: | | 48:00 |

== Personnel ==
Queens of the Stone Age

- Josh Homme - lead vocals, guitar (all tracks)
- Troy Van Leeuwen - guitar, backing vocals (all tracks), keyboards (6)
- Dean Fertita - backing vocals (all tracks), keyboards (all but 2), guitar (2, 5, 6)
- Michael Shuman - bass guitar, backing vocals (all tracks)
- Jon Theodore - drums (all tracks)

Additional personnel

- Nikka Costa – background vocals
- Matt Sweeney – background vocals
- Fred Martin – background vocals
- Tai Phillips – background vocals
- Faith Matovia – background vocals
- The Section Quartet – strings on tracks 1, 3, 6
- James King – saxophone on tracks 2, 6

Production and design

- Mark Ronson – production
- Mark Rankin – co-production, engineering
- Wesley Seidman – engineering assistant
- Justin Smith – engineering assistant
- Caesar Edmunds – mix engineering
- Alan Moulder – mixing
- Gavin Lurssen – mastering
- Reuben Cohen – mastering
- Matt Zivich – guitar technician
- Wayne Faler – guitar technician
- Sahir Hanif – drum technician
- Boneface – design, illustrations

== Charts ==
=== Weekly charts ===
| Chart (2017) | Peak position |
|---|---|
| Australian Albums (ARIA) | 1 |
| Austrian Albums (Ö3 Austria) | 2 |
| Belgian Albums (Ultratop Flanders) | 2 |
| Belgian Albums (Ultratop Wallonia) | 3 |
| Canadian Albums (Billboard) | 1 |
| Czech Albums (ČNS IFPI) | 15 |
| Danish Albums (Hitlisten) | 8 |
| Dutch Albums (Album Top 100) | 1 |
| Finnish Albums (Suomen virallinen lista) | 2 |
| French Albums (SNEP) | 4 |
| German Albums (Offizielle Top 100) | 2 |
| Hungarian Albums (MAHASZ) | 17 |
| Irish Albums (IRMA) | 2 |
| Italian Albums (FIMI) | 5 |
| New Zealand Albums (RMNZ) | 1 |
| Norwegian Albums (VG-lista) | 2 |
| Polish Albums (ZPAV) | 6 |
| Portuguese Albums (AFP) | 1 |
| Scottish Albums (Official Charts) | 1 |
| Spanish Albums (PROMUSICAE) | 2 |
| Swedish Albums (Sverigetopplistan) | 7 |
| Swiss Albums (Schweizer Hitparade) | 1 |
| UK Albums (Official Charts) | 1 |
| UK Independent Albums (Official Charts) | 1 |
| UK Rock & Metal Albums (Official Charts) | 1 |
| US Billboard 200 | 3 |
| US Top Alternative Albums (Billboard) | 1 |
| US Top Rock Albums (Billboard) | 1 |

=== Year-end charts ===
| Chart (2017) | Position |
|---|---|
| Australian Albums (ARIA) | 52 |
| Austrian Albums (Ö3 Austria) | 65 |
| Belgian Albums (Ultratop Flanders) | 21 |
| Belgian Albums (Ultratop Wallonia) | 113 |
| Dutch Albums (MegaCharts) | 70 |
| New Zealand Albums (RMNZ) | 50 |
| Swiss Albums (Schweizer Hitparade) | 75 |
| US Top Rock Albums (Billboard) | 41 |

| Chart (2018) | Position |
|---|---|
| Belgian Albums (Ultratop Flanders) | 144 |

== Certifications and sales ==
| Region | Certification | Certified units/sales |
|---|---|---|
| Australia (ARIA) | Gold | 35,000^{‡} |
| Canada (Music Canada) | Gold | 40,000^{‡} |
| New Zealand (RMNZ) | Gold | 7,500^{‡} |
| United Kingdom (BPI) | Gold | 100,000^{‡} |
| United States | — | 130,000 |
Summaries
| Worldwide | — | 400,000 |
^{‡} Sales+streaming figures based on certification alone.
