= Easy street =

Easy Street may refer to:

== Film and television ==
- Easy Street (1917 film), an American comedy starring Charlie Chaplin
- Easy Street (1930 film), an American film by Oscar Micheaux
- Easy Street (TV series), a 1986–1987 American sitcom

== Literature ==
- Easy Street (book), a 1981 memoir by Susan Berman, daughter of the mobster David Berman
- Easy Street, a 1979 play by Nigel Williams

== Music ==
- Easy Street (band), a 1970s British soft-rock band, with an eponymous 1976 album
- Easy Street (album), by Eric Marienthal, or the title track, 1997
- Easy Street, an album by Eric Hutchinson, 2016
- Easy Street Records, a record store in Seattle, Washington, U.S.

=== Songs ===
- "Easy Street" (Alan Rankin Jones song), a jazz standard, 1940
- "Easy Street" (Queens of the Stone Age song), 2026
- "Easy Street", from the musical Annie, 1976
- "Easy Street", by the Collapsable Hearts Club, in "The Cell", an episode of The Walking Dead, 2016
- "Easy Street", by Edgar Winter from Shock Treatment, 1974
- "Easy Street", by Randy Newman from Harps and Angels, 2008
- "Easy Street", by Soul Asylum from And the Horse They Rode In On, 1990

== See also ==
- "Eazy Street", a song by Eazy-E from The Return of Superfly film soundtrack, 1990
- EZ Streets, a 1996–1997 American television drama
- Easey Street murders, in 1977 in Collingwood, Victoria, Australia
