= I Sat by the Ocean =

Single by Queens of the Stone Age

from the album ...Like Clockwork
- Released: August 6, 2013
- Genre: Alternative rock; hard rock
- Length: 3:55
- Label: Matador
- Songwriters: Josh Homme; Troy Van Leeuwen; Michael Shuman; Dean Fertita
- Producers: Josh Homme; Troy Van Leeuwen; Michael Shuman; Dean Fertita

Queens of the Stone Age singles chronology
| "My God Is the Sun" (2013) | "I Sat by the Ocean" (2013) | "The Way You Used to Do" (2017) |

"I Sat by the Ocean" is the second single by American rock band Queens of the Stone Age from their sixth studio album, ...Like Clockwork (2013). It was released on August 6, 2013, shortly after the band's performance at Lollapalooza music festival on August 4.

On July 31, 2013, Queens of the Stone Age performed the song on the late-night talk show Jimmy Kimmel Live!, together with the first single from the album, "My God Is the Sun".

== Personnel ==
Queens of the Stone Age

- Joshua Homme – lead vocals, guitar, slide guitar, shakers
- Troy Van Leeuwen – guitar, claps
- Michael Shuman – vocals, bass guitar, tambourine
- Dean Fertita – Wurly, piano, guitar, slide guitar

Additional musician

- Joey Castillo – drums, claps

Technical personnel

- Joshua Homme & Queens of the Stone Age – production
- Mark Rankin – engineering, mixing
- Alain Johannes – additional engineering
- Justin Smith – additional engineering
- Gavin Lurssen – mastering

== Charts ==
Weekly chart performance
| Chart (2013) | Peak position |
|---|---|
| Canada Rock (Billboard) | 15 |
| Finland Airplay (Radiosoittolista) | 70 |
| UK Streaming (OCC) | 96 |
| US Rock & Alternative Airplay (Billboard) | 23 |
| US Alternative Airplay (Billboard) | 15 |

== Certifications ==
Certifications and sales
| Region | Certification | Certified units/sales |
|---|---|---|
| Canada (Music Canada) | Gold | 40,000^{‡} |
| New Zealand (RMNZ) | Gold | 15,000^{‡} |
^{‡} Sales+streaming figures based on certification alone.
