= The Vampyre of Time and Memory =

Promotional single by Queens of the Stone Age

from the album ...Like Clockwork
- Released: November 2013
- Recorded: August 9, 2012 – March 9, 2013
- Studio: Pink Duck Studios in Burbank, California
- Genre: Alternative rock; art rock
- Length: 3:34
- Label: Matador; Rekords
- Songwriter: Queens of the Stone Age
- Lyricist: Joshua Homme
- Producers: Joshua Homme; Michael Shuman; Troy Van Leeuwen; Dean Fertita

"The Vampyre of Time and Memory" is a song by the American band Queens of the Stone Age, from their sixth studio album, ...Like Clockwork. Written by Josh Homme, the song was released as a promotional single in November 2013.

The band performed the track live on Conan on October 30, 2013. An interactive music video for the song was also released on November 18, 2013.

== Critical reception ==
Jason Heller of The A.V. Club described the song as "insidiously catchy." Leonie Cooper of NME wrote that the song "is a startlingly low-key piano hymnal, even with its flashes of Giorgio Moroder synths and cocaine-soul guitar solo," while comparing the confessional lyrics and the power ballad melody to the works of Fleetwood Mac. Kitty Empire of The Observer also compared the song to the works of David Bowie during the 1970s. Hywel Roberts similarly wrote that the song "is a piano driven Bond-esque track with Homme sounding really very similar to David Bowie in the opening verse. Stuart Berman of Pitchfork stated that the song "strains too hard in its attempt at an early-70s John Lennon piano ballad."

In his track-by-track review, Gary Graff of Billboard wrote: "This dark power ballad starts with just Homme's voice and piano before filling out into an angsty but tuneful lament." Sharon O'Connell of Uncut stated that elements of electronica are added to a backdrop of the song "that taps, Eric Clapton, Queen and early-’70s Elton John."

== Music video ==
A teaser trailer for the interactive music video was released on October 28, 2013, while the video itself was officially released on November 18, 2013. It was directed by Kii Arens and Jason Trucco, in partnership with the Creators Project.

The video shows "embalmed-looking Josh Homme" and rest of the band performing in a set of increasingly macabre locales, including "a taxidermist's parlor", accompanied by "two maids and one voodoo priestess". The viewers of the interactive video are able to tour "a haunted house" which the band is performing in and flip through the song's lyrics.

The regular version of the music video was also released on YouTube.

Ms. Dolly Boyd plays the role of the voodoo priestess.

== Personnel ==
Queens of the Stone Age

- Joshua Homme – vocals, piano, lead guitar, Moog, Roland SH-2, drums
- Michael Shuman – bass
- Troy Van Leeuwen – guitar, Moog lap steel, Moog, Korg Arpeggio
- Dean Fertita – piano, guitars

Additional musician

- Joey Castillo – drums

Technical personnel

- Joshua Homme & Queens of the Stone Age – production
- Mark Rankin – engineering, mixing
- Alain Johannes – additional engineering
- Justin Smith – additional engineering
- Gavin Lurssen – mastering
