= The Way You Used to Do =

Single by Queens of the Stone Age

from the album Villains
- Released: June 15, 2017
- Recorded: Early 2017
- Genre: Boogie rock; glam rock
- Length: 4:34 (album); 4:16 (radio edit)
- Label: Matador
- Songwriters: Josh Homme; Troy Van Leeuwen; Dean Fertita; Michael Shuman
- Producer: Mark Ronson

Queens of the Stone Age singles chronology
"I Sat by the Ocean" (2013)	"The Way You Used to Do" (2017)	"The Evil Has Landed" (2017)

"The Way You Used to Do" is the first single from the Queens of the Stone Age album Villains. The single was released on June 15, 2017. The song is featured in the soundtrack of the 2017 racing video game Need for Speed Payback.

Rolling Stone described the song as "grisly and jumping".

== Background ==
"The Way You Used to Do" was first released on June 15, 2017. A music video, directed by Jonas Åkerlund, was released on August 15, 2017.

== Charts ==
=== Weekly charts ===
Weekly chart performance for "The Way You Used to Do"
Chart (2017)	Peak position
Belgium (Ultratip Bubbling Under Flanders)	11
Canada Rock (Billboard)	1
Czech Republic Modern Rock (IFPI)	4
Finland Airplay (Radiosoittolista)	100
Iceland (RÚV)	20
New Zealand Heatseekers (RMNZ)	7
Scotland Singles (OCC)	82
UK Singles Downloads (OCC)	92
UK Indie (OCC)	23
UK Rock & Metal (OCC)	7
US Hot Rock & Alternative Songs (Billboard)	16
US Rock & Alternative Airplay (Billboard)	6

=== Year-end charts ===
Year-end chart performance for "The Way You Used to Do"
Chart (2017)	Position
US Hot Rock Songs (Billboard)	51
US Rock Airplay (Billboard)	25

== Certifications ==
Certifications for "The Way You Used to Do"
Region	Certification	Certified units/sales
Canada (Music Canada)	Platinum	80,000^{‡}
New Zealand (RMNZ)	Gold	15,000^{‡}
United Kingdom (BPI)	Silver	200,000^{‡}
^{‡} Sales+streaming figures based on certification alone.
