= ...Like Clockwork =

- Physical cover (Note: The digital cover has no text.)

Studio album by Queens of the Stone Age
- Released: June 3, 2013
- Recorded: August 9, 2012 – March 9, 2013
- Studio: Pink Duck (Burbank)
- Genres: Alternative rock; hard rock; desert rock; stoner rock; art rock
- Length: 45:59
- Label: Matador
- Producers: Josh Homme; Queens of the Stone Age; James Lavelle

Queens of the Stone Age chronology
Era Vulgaris (2007)	...Like Clockwork (2013)	...Like Cologne (2013)

Singles from ...Like Clockwork
- 1. "My God Is the Sun" Released: April 8, 2013; 2. "I Sat by the Ocean" Released: August 6, 2013

...Like Clockwork is the sixth studio album by American rock band Queens of the Stone Age. It was released on June 3, 2013 in the United Kingdom and a day later in the United States by Matador Records, marking the first entry in the first trilogy with the record label which continued with Villains and concluded with In Times New Roman.... Self-produced by the band, it is the first Queens of the Stone Age album to feature full contributions from bassist Michael Shuman and keyboardist and guitarist Dean Fertita, who both joined the band in 2007 to tour in support of the band's fifth studio album, Era Vulgaris, and record its bonus tracks.

After several false starts and stops, the band began recording ...Like Clockwork in August 2012, initially hoping that collaborator Trent Reznor would produce the album. Following a stormy recording period, which included the departure of long-time drummer Joey Castillo, founding member Josh Homme described the album as "documenting the journey of moving forward, you know. It was a tough time and I thought, 'I can run away from this, or I can run into it.'"

Upon release, ...Like Clockwork received critical acclaim and was a commercial success, debuting at number one on the US Billboard 200, earning the band their first US number-one album, and number two on the UK Albums Chart. The album was nominated for three Grammy Awards, including Best Rock Album.

== Background ==
In 2011, frontman Josh Homme was hospitalized for thirteen days, and subsequently bedridden for four months, following complications during a routine surgical procedure on his knee. Homme noted, "I woke up and there was a doctor going, 'Shit, we lost you.' I couldn't get up for four months. When I did, I hadn't got a clue what was going on." In June 2016, Homme clarified that his knee surgery was in no way connected to his "death", and that this story was created by "somebody else". He added that the real situation involved an MRSA infection brought on by going "in too deep" with drugs.

During this time, Homme sank into a deep depression, noting "I would never say, 'I'm probably not gonna make it out of here.' But back then, I would definitely think it." The remaining members of Queens of the Stone Age – guitarist Troy Van Leeuwen, drummer Joey Castillo, bassist Michael Shuman and guitarist and keyboardist Dean Fertita – encouraged Homme to return to the band to begin work on a sixth studio album. Homme noted, "I had to ask them 'If you want to make a record with me right now, in the state I'm in, come into the fog. It's the only chance you got.' It brought us much closer, because you never really know someone till everything goes wrong."

The band subsequently reissued its debut studio album, Queens of the Stone Age (1998), in 2011; the band also embarked upon an extensive tour playing the album in full each night. Homme stated, "Doing the rehearsals for the first record is really defining the new one. It's been turning the new record into something else. What we were doing was kind of bluesy, and now it's turned into this trancey, broken thing. The robots are back!" However, in 2013, Homme noted, "I was hoping that playing the first record would really inspire me and make me fall in love with music again. But I think I was just lost, looking for something in the dark. In that dark I found ...Like Clockwork."

== Production ==
=== Recording and contributions ===
On August 20, 2012, the band stated via their Facebook page that they were recording their new album. Tumult that surfaced during the recording of the album provided inspiration for the LP's title. Homme explained to Rolling Stone magazine: "We'd have these great victories and then something would go south for a bit, and we'd go, 'It's like clockwork!' I think a sick sense of humor is what's always been our preservation mechanism, so this time we're using that sick sense of humor for a title."

In November 2012, Homme told BBC's Zane Lowe that Joey Castillo had left the band and that drums on the new album would be performed by Dave Grohl, who performed on Songs for the Deaf (2002). Homme also confirmed that the album would be released prior to their performance at the Download Festival in June 2013. In addition to Grohl, other former members contributing to the album include former bassists Nick Oliveri and Alain Johannes as well as vocalist Mark Lanegan.

A number of collaborations from different musicians were also present for the new album, including Trent Reznor, Jake Shears, Alex Turner, James Lavelle, Brody Dalle, and Elton John. John ended up on the album after surprising Homme with a phone call, telling him he needed an "actual queen" on the record. In addition to Dave Grohl's drum contribution, the record also features performances by former drummer Joey Castillo as well as a track by new drummer Jon Theodore on the title track, "...Like Clockwork".

Guitarist Troy Van Leeuwen praised recording engineer Mark Rankin's contributions stating, "I think it was pretty key to have Mark there. He went through the process with us, and now he's like a brother. He was completely an outsider to what we were doing, and that was the one thing that we consciously decided. For this record we wanted to go out of our comfort zone, usually we're around friends of ours. For this one, I think it was important to work with somebody who didn't even know what some of our influences were. Someone completely out of the box for us, and I think he was key in making this record sound the way it does."

=== Joey Castillo's departure ===
During the recording process, longtime drummer Joey Castillo left the band, and former contributor Dave Grohl stepped in to play drums on the rest of the album. Regarding Castillo's departure, guitarist and keyboardist Dean Fertita noted: "We were maybe about a third of the way in, so there was still a lot of work to do. That was an emotional thing for us; we love Joey to death."

=== Nick Oliveri's contribution ===
Former bass guitarist Nick Oliveri, who was fired by Josh Homme in 2004, provided backing vocals on "If I Had a Tail", and upon hearing that drummer Dave Grohl was returning to Queens of the Stone Age to assist in the recording process, Oliveri asked Homme if he too could return on bass guitar. Oliveri noted: "I actually put in a request with Josh. I heard Dave was playing on the record, and I was like, 'Dude! I wanna play bass on it!' I'd be a fool not to ask. If Dave Grohl was playing drums, then I want in. He's an amazing drummer. I never had a better time in my life than when Dave was in the band." Homme ultimately chose current bassist Michael Shuman, who joined the band in 2007 upon Era Vulgaris' release.

Regarding Oliveri's backing vocal contributions, Homme noted: "Nick and I have been friends since a couple weeks after everything went down in 2004. People don't know that, and it would be awkward for me to run around making sure everyone knew it. Nick recorded his new record at my studio, and then he was going to drop off some records and he said, 'Hey, need anyone to sing backup?' And I was like, 'Actually, yeah, come on in.' That's a nice thing. It was easy. It's nice to know someone since you were a little kid, and still know them."

== Cover art ==
The cover art for the album was created by Liverpool-based artist Boneface. It is based on a publicity still for the 1931 film Dracula. Alongside the original red cover, the band released a limited edition vinyl with a blue cover exclusively through independent retailers. Another limited edition vinyl with an all black cover was released on Black Friday through record retailers worldwide.

== Promotion and announcements ==
In March 2013, the band announced that the new album, titled ...Like Clockwork, would be released in June 2013 on Matador Records. On March 22, 2013, the band teased the album artwork for ...Like Clockwork on Facebook. They premiered a new song titled "My God Is the Sun" at Lollapalooza Brazil on March 30, 2013. The performance saw Jon Theodore make his live debut with the band. The studio version of "My God Is the Sun" premiered on Zane Lowe's Radio 1 show on April 8, 2013. It was then confirmed by the band's official Facebook page that the song would be released on iTunes on April 8.

On May 6, 2013, an animation featuring half of the song "I Appear Missing" was launched from the website www.likeclockwork.tv. On May 8, the band performed a couple of their new songs on a small intimate concert in Antwerp ('Zuiderpershuis'), called 'Club 69', an exclusive show with only 69 invited couples. Tickets had to be won on Studio Brussel. The set included "My God Is the Sun", "I Sat by the Ocean", "Keep Your Eyes Peeled" and "If I Had a Tail". A few days later on May 14, part of the track "Kalopsia" appeared on the site. A day later on May 15, part of "Keep Your Eyes Peeled" was posted along with a full leak of the album on SoundCloud. The same day, the band performed "If I Had a Tail" and "My God Is the Sun" on the Dutch TV show De Wereld Draait Door. May 16 saw "If I Had a Tail" posted to likeclockwork.tv with the final video in the series "My God Is the Sun" posted on May 17. On May 20, a short film of all five videos illustrated by Boneface and animated by British illustrator and animator Liam Brazier was released.

On May 23, a live performance of the band at The Wiltern was broadcast live on NPR's website, and featured all the songs from the album except for "Fairweather Friends". On May 28, free streaming of the album was made available on iTunes. On May 29, the CD-quality version of the album appeared on file sharing networks.

== Reception ==
Professional ratings
Aggregate scores
Source	Rating
AnyDecentMusic?	8.0/10
Metacritic	82/100
Review scores
Source	Rating
AllMusic	5/5 stars
The A.V. Club	A−
Entertainment Weekly	A
The Guardian	4/5 stars
The Independent	4/5 stars
Los Angeles Times	3/4 stars
NME	9/10
Pitchfork	7.3/10
Rolling Stone	4/5 stars
Spin	8/10

...Like Clockwork has received critical acclaim. According to Metacritic, it is their most acclaimed album since Songs for the Deaf (2002), with an average score of 82, based on 46 reviews. Giving the album five stars out of five, Stephen Thomas Erlewine of AllMusic commented that "'...Like Clockwork' is unusually focused for a Queens of the Stone Age record, containing all of the group's hallmarks — namely volume and crunch, but also a tantalizing sense of danger, finding seduction within the darkness." At Alternative Press, Dan Slessor wrote that "surrendering to its strange charms could be one of the smartest decisions you make this year."

=== Awards and accolades ===
In December 2013, it was announced that ...Like Clockwork had been nominated for two Grammy Awards, in the categories Best Rock Album and Best Engineered Album, Non-Classical. Queens of the Stone Age received a third nomination for the song "My God Is the Sun" in the category Best Rock Performance.

Chris Talbot of the Associated Press ranked the album at number two on his list of the top 10 albums of 2013. 17 music journalists of the Polish media company Agora SA (Gazeta Wyborcza, Gazeta.pl, TOK FM) placed ...Like Clockwork at number four in their ranking of 10 Best Foreign Albums of 2013, behind Arcade Fire's Reflektor, Arctic Monkeys' AM and Push the Sky Away by Nick Cave and the Bad Seeds.

Later in the year, NME ranked it at number 335 in its list of The 500 Greatest Albums of All Time. Also in December 2014, NME ranked it as number 25 on their list of the 25 Best Albums of the Decade So Far.

In 2024, Loudwire staff elected it as the best hard rock album of 2013.

=== Commercial performance ===
The album debuted at number one on the Billboard 200 with sales of over 91,000 copies in its first week. It is the band's first album to reach number 1 on the chart. It is also the band's biggest first-week sales since the release of their 2005 album, Lullabies to Paralyze. The album debuted at number 2 on the Canadian Albums Chart, selling 11,000 copies in its first week. In 2014 it was awarded a diamond certification from the Independent Music Companies Association, which indicated sales of at least 200,000 copies throughout Europe.

== Track listing ==
All lyrics are written by Josh Homme; all music is composed by Queens of the Stone Age, except where noted.

No.	Title	Music	Length
1.	"Keep Your Eyes Peeled"		5:04
2.	"I Sat by the Ocean"		3:55
3.	"The Vampyre of Time and Memory"		3:34
4.	"If I Had a Tail"		4:55
5.	"My God Is the Sun"		3:55
6.	"Kalopsia"		4:38
7.	"Fairweather Friends"	Queens of the Stone Age, Mark Lanegan	3:43
8.	"Smooth Sailing"		4:51
9.	"I Appear Missing"		6:00
10.	"...Like Clockwork"	Homme, James Lavelle, Charlie May	5:24
Total length:			45:59

== Personnel ==
Personnel adapted from physical and digital liner notes.

Queens of the Stone Age

- Joshua Homme – lead vocals, guitar; slide guitar (2, 9), glass (1), shakers (2), piano, Moog synthesizer, Roland SH-201 and drums (3), percussion (5), air (6), frog and looper (8), twelve-string guitar (9, 10), bass guitar (10), production (all tracks)
- Troy Van Leeuwen – guitar; backing vocals (4, 5, 7, 9), Moog synthesizer (3–5), shakers (1, 9), handclaps (2, 8), lap steel guitar (3, 6), twelve-string guitar (5, 9), drone guitar (9, 10), Korg synthesizer (3), percussion (5), acoustic guitar and twelve-string slide guitar (10)
- Michael Shuman – bass guitar (all except 10), backing vocals (2, 4, 5, 8, 9), cymbals (1), tambourine (2), twelve-string guitar (4), Moog synthesizer (6), guitar (7), claves, shakers and handclaps (8), Mellotron (10)
- Dean Fertita – guitar (1–3, 5–8, 10), piano (1–3, 6), Wurlitzer electric piano (2, 7), glass (1), slide guitar (2), Moog and Korg synthesizers (4), Rhodes piano and Korg MS-10 (6), clavinet and backing vocals (9)

Additional musicians

- Joey Castillo – drums and percussion (1–3, 6), handclaps (1, 2)
- Dave Grohl – drums and percussion (4, 5, 7–9)
- Nick Oliveri – backing vocals (4)
- Mark Lanegan – backing vocals (4)
- Trent Reznor – co-lead vocals, kick and snare (6), backing vocals (7)
- Jake Shears – backing vocals (1)
- Alex Turner – backing vocals (4)
- Elton John – backing vocals and piano (7)
- Jon Theodore – drums and percussion (10)
- Charlie May – piano (10)
- Philip Sheppard – strings and arrangements (10)

Additional personnel

- Queens of the Stone Age – production (all tracks except 10)
- James Lavelle – arrangements and production (10)
- Mark Rankin – recording; mixing (all except 7)
- Joe Barresi – mixing (7)
- Alain Johannes – additional engineering
- Justin Smith – additional engineering
- Gavin Lurssen – mastering
- Boneface – design, illustrations
- Liam Brazier – animations

== Chart positions ==
=== Weekly charts ===
Chart (2013)	Peak position
Australian Albums (ARIA)	1
Austrian Albums (Ö3 Austria)	3
Belgian Albums (Ultratop Flanders)	1
Belgian Albums (Ultratop Wallonia)	12
Canadian Albums (Billboard)	2
Danish Albums (Hitlisten)	4
Dutch Albums (Album Top 100)	3
Finnish Albums (Suomen virallinen lista)	2
French Albums (SNEP)	8
German Albums (Offizielle Top 100)	7
Irish Albums (IRMA)	1
Italian Albums (FIMI)	11
New Zealand Albums (RMNZ)	2
Norwegian Albums (VG-lista)	2
Polish Albums (ZPAV)	13
Portuguese Albums (AFP)	1
Scottish Albums (Official Charts)	1
Spanish Albums (Promusicae)	7
Swedish Albums (Sverigetopplistan)	3
Swiss Albums (Schweizer Hitparade)	2
UK Albums (Official Charts)	2
UK Independent Albums (Official Charts)	1
UK Rock & Metal Albums (Official Charts)	1
US Billboard 200	1
US Top Alternative Albums (Billboard)	1
US Digital Albums (Billboard)	1
US Top Hard Rock Albums (Billboard)	1
US Independent Albums (Billboard)	1
US Top Rock Albums (Billboard)	1

=== Year-end charts ===
Chart (2013)	Position
Australian Albums (ARIA)	59
Austrian Albums (Ö3 Austria)	70
Belgian Albums (Ultratop Flanders)	14
Belgian Albums (Ultratop Wallonia)	105
Dutch Albums (Album Top 100)	71
French Albums (SNEP)	196
Swiss Albums (Schweizer Hitparade)	66
UK Albums (OCC)	85
US Billboard 200	141
US Top Alternative Albums (Billboard)	24
US Top Hard Rock Albums (Billboard)	7
US Independent Albums (Billboard)	13
US Top Rock Albums (Billboard)	33

Chart (2014)	Position
Belgium Albums (Ultratop Flanders)	63
US Top Hard Rock Albums (Billboard)	30

=== Certifications ===
Region	Certification	Certified units/sales
Australia (ARIA)	Platinum	70,000^{‡}
Canada (Music Canada)	Gold	40,000^{^}
Poland (ZPAV)	Gold	10,000^{*}
United Kingdom (BPI)	Gold	100,000^{^}
^{*} Sales figures based on certification alone.^{^} Shipments figures based on certification alone.^{‡} Sales+streaming figures based on certification alone.
