= Dean Fertita =

American rock musician (born 1970)

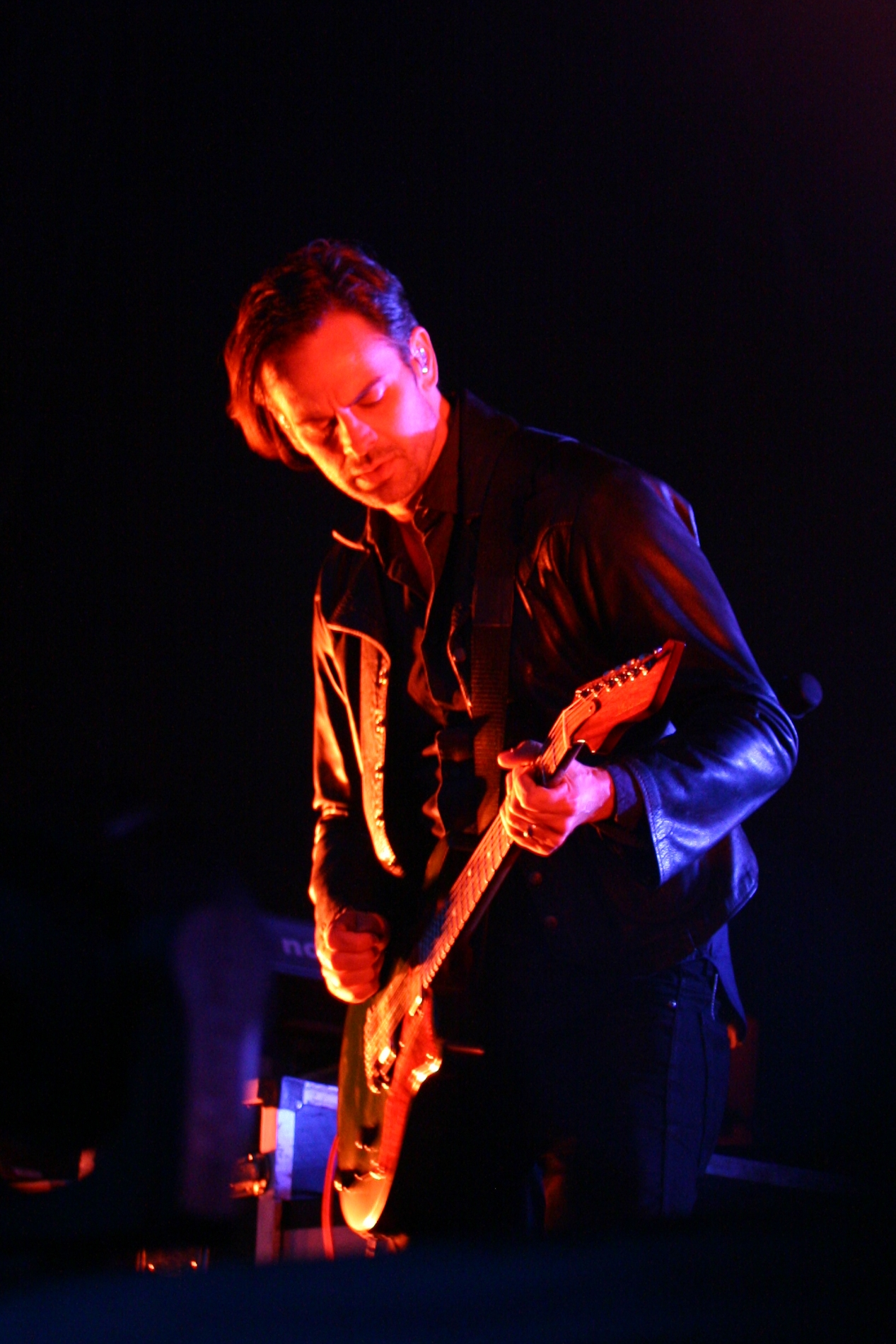
- Fertita performing with Queens Of The Stone Age in 2014.

Background information
- Born: September 6, 1970 (age 56)
- Origin: Royal Oak, Michigan, U.S.
- Genres: Hard rock; alternative rock; indie rock; blues rock; garage rock
- Occupations: Musician; songwriter
- Instruments: Vocals; guitar; keyboards; bass guitar
- Labels: Interscope Records; Rekords Rekords; Third Man Records; Schnitzel Records

Dean Anthony Fertita (born September 6, 1970) is an American rock multi-instrumentalist. He is best known as a keyboardist and guitarist of the hard rock band Queens of the Stone Age, and as the guitarist and keyboardist for the Dead Weather.

Fertita was the lead singer and guitarist of the Waxwings from the band's formation in 1997 to its breakup in 2005. Fertita then moved on to collaborate with Brendan Benson, playing keyboards and guitar on Benson's solo releases and as a touring keyboard player for the Raconteurs. In 2007, Fertita joined Queens of the Stone Age to replace the late Natasha Shneider on keyboards and occasionally guitar on some songs.

In 2015, Fertita collaborated with his Queens of the Stone Age bandmate Josh Homme in recording Iggy Pop's studio album, Post Pop Depression (2016), and in 2019 he rejoined the Raconteurs as a sideman in support of their third studio album, Help Us Stranger.

Fertita has released two solo albums to date, with his first being released under the name Hello=Fire in 2009, and his second under the name Tropical Gothclub in 2022.

== Recording career ==
=== Reigndance ===
Fertita was a member of the band Reigndance from 1989–97 and appeared briefly on the first season of MTV's The Real World.

=== The Waxwings ===
In 1997 Fertita formed the power pop band The Waxwings along with bassist Kevin Peyok, drummer James Edmunds and guitarist Dominic Romano. The band's name, as well as the name of their debut record, was derived from the first line of a poem in Vladimir Nabokov's novel Pale Fire:

In 2000 The Waxwings signed with Bobsled Records and began work on their debut album, Low to the Ground, recorded at Terrarium Studios in Minneapolis, Minnesota with Bryan Hanna. The albums was featured in Magnet Magazine's Top 20 albums of 2000–2001. In 2002 the band released their second album Shadows Of... After the band's release party a letter surfaced, in which Bobslead Records head, Bob Salerno, ridiculed the band for what he considered to be a poor live performance. The letter gained notoriety after being posted on the internet entertainment forum the Velvet Rope.

After the controversy with Salerno the band released their third album – recorded with Brendan Benson – Let's Make Our Descent on Rainbow Quartz Records in 2004. In 2005 the band stated on its official website that work had begun on songs for a fourth studio album. Since then members of the band have been involved with other projects and no information regarding the band's status have been released.

=== Brendan Benson collaboration ===
After The Waxwings broke up in 2004, Fertita was recruited by Brendan Benson to play keyboard on Benson's two-man British acoustic tour Fertita and Benson first met each other via mutual friends in high school, and soon established a working relationship. Fertita cites Benson as a big influence, inspiring him to focus more energy on song writing instead of loud riffs. When Benson formed The Raconteurs Fertita was recruited to play keyboards and organ on the tour in support of the Broken Boy Soldiers album. Fertita also recorded clavinet parts for the band's second studio album Consolers of the Lonely in 2008. Benson also produced and made several contributions to Fertita's debut solo album.

=== Queens of the Stone Age ===
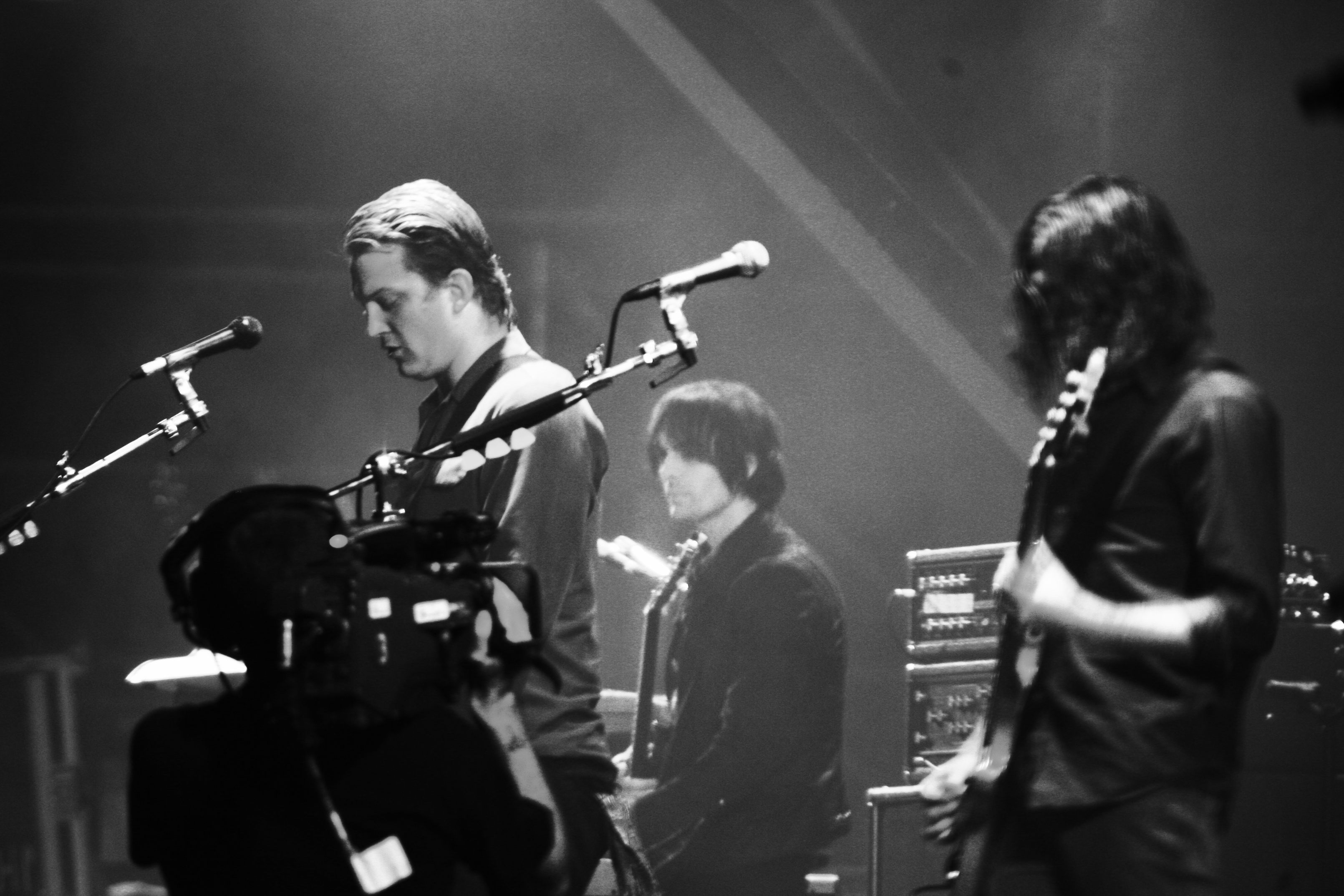
Homme, Fertita and Shuman in 2007.

During the tour with the Raconteurs, Fertita got to know the band's sound man Hutch, who is also the long time sound man of Queens of the Stone Age. In 2007, Hutch asked Fertita to join the Queens of the Stone Age as their new keyboardist and additional guitarist, replacing the late Natasha Shneider. Fertita accepted and along with newly recruited bassist Michael Shuman recorded later bonus tracks. Era Vulgaris was released on June 12, 2007 and was followed by the Duluth Tour, which was named due to the fact that the band was scheduled to perform in many small towns and cities they had never played before, such as Duluth, Minnesota. On August 16, 2008, Queens of the Stone Age performed a concert in celebration of Natasha Shneider's life at the Henry Fonda Theatre in Los Angeles. They were joined on stage by Alain Johannes, Jack Black, Kyle Gass, Matt Cameron, Brody Dalle, Jesse Hughes, Chris Goss and PJ Harvey, playing a variety of QOTSA and non-QOTSA songs. Proceeds from the concert went to defray the costs associated with Natasha’s illness. In 2009 the members of the band took time off and were involved in a variety of other projects, but reconvened in the summer of 2010 to play a number of shows in support of a reissue of Rated R which was released on August 3. They released a remastered version of their first self-titled album early 2011 which was supported with performances of the album in its entirety.

In 2013, Queens of the Stone Age released ...Like Clockwork, their first full album since Fertita joined the band. On the album, Fertita plays piano, guitar, slide guitar, synthesizers, clavinet and provides background vocals. The album was the first Queens album to reach number one on the Billboard 200. It also reached number two on the UK Albums Chart and was nominated for three Grammy Awards, including Best Rock Album.

=== The Dead Weather ===
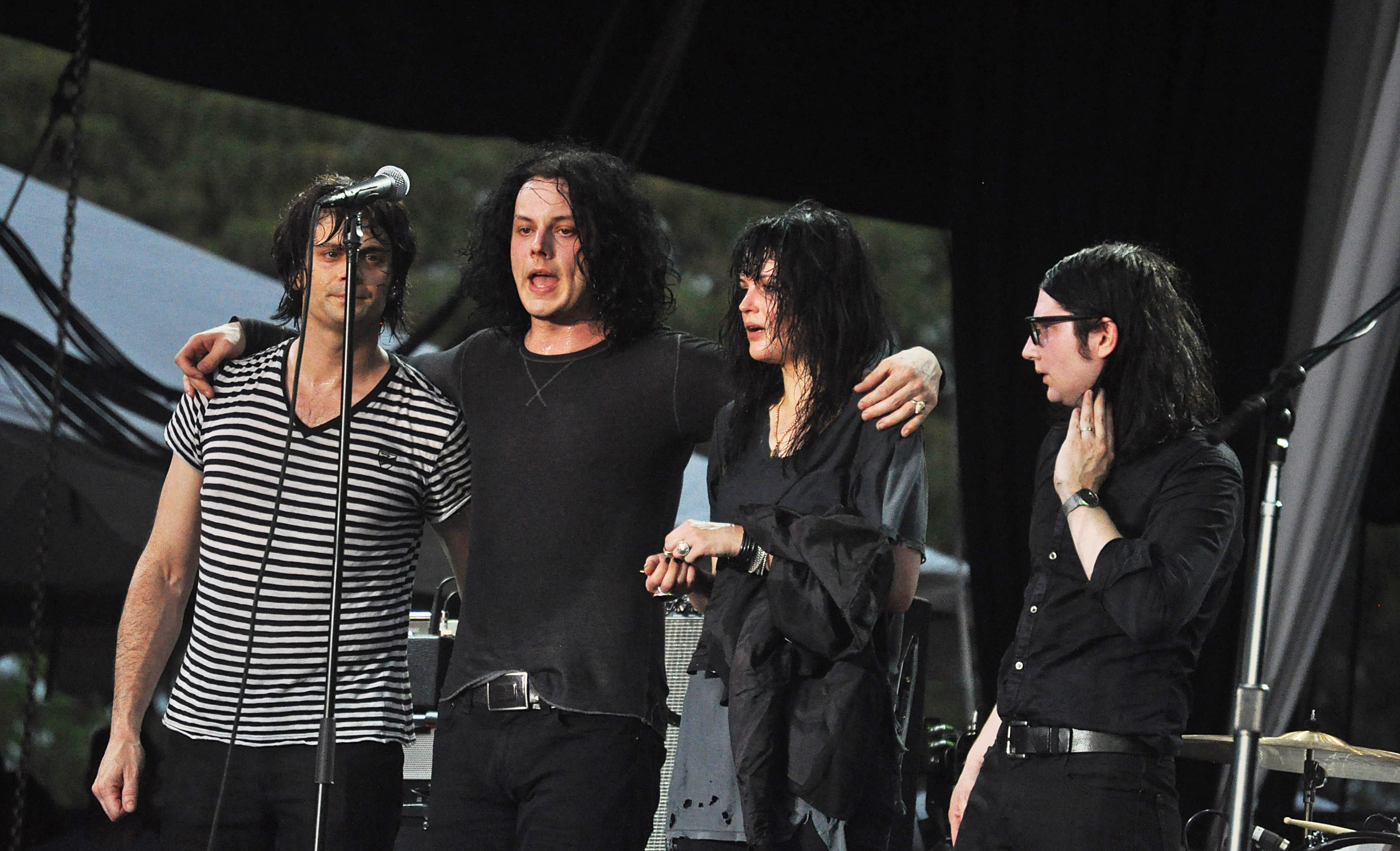
Dean Fertita (far left) along with The Dead Weather.

In 2009 Fertita along with Jack White on drums, Alison Mosshart on lead vocals, and Jack Lawrence on bass formed The Dead Weather. The group originally only intended to record a 7-inch single but plans changed and the band wrote and recorded their debut album in fifteen days. The band's debut album – Horehound – was released July 14, 2009 and was followed by a supporting tour. In October 2009 lead vocalist Mosshart confirmed that a second album was "halfway done". Later, White revealed in an interview that the band is hoping to have 20 to 25 songs ready for their Australian tour in March 2010. It was later confirmed that the first single from the new album – Sea of Cowards – would be called "Die by the Drop" which was released March 30. The Sea of Cowards Tour began on March 19, 2010, is ended on August 3, 2010. It included 42 shows over four legs. On September 25, 2015, the Dead Weather released their third studio album Dodge and Burn.

=== Eagles of Death Metal ===
In June 2010, it was announced that Fertita would fill in on bass playing duties for Brian O'Connor, whilst the Eagles of Death Metal bass player undergoes treatment for cancer. Prior to O'Connor's illness Fertita also made a guest appearance playing keyboards during a performance of "Wannabe In L.A". After returning to the Queens of the Stone Age Fertita was replaced by Abby Travis.

=== As a solo artist ===
In 2009 Fertita released his first solo effort under the moniker Hello=Fire, the album was recorded over a period of a year and a half and was recorded when Fertita along with friends found available time in studios, however, some songs were written as early as 2005 and 2006 while touring with Brendan Benson. The album includes performances by fellow Queens of the Stone Age bandmates Troy Van Leeuwen, Joey Castillo and Michael Shuman, as well as Brendan Benson and the Afghan Whigs' Michael Horrigan. The self-titled album was released October 26, 2009 on Schnitzel Records. And the song "Nature of Our Minds" was its first single. Fertita had plans to play a number of concerts in support of the album during the break from Queens of the Stone Age however after joining The Dead Weather the planned live performances were canceled. In 2010, Fertita re-recorded the Waxwings song "Different Plane" for the Novalis radiosurgery "Shaping Cancer Care Around You” national television commercial, currently running in the United States. In 2011 Fertita revealed that he had begun working on a second solo album, but his main focus was to write and record the sixth record with the Queens of the Stone Age.

Fertita recorded guitar and keyboards on Post Pop Depression, written by Iggy Pop and Josh Homme, which was released in March 2016. He later toured with them to support the album.

On November 4, 2022 Tropical Gothclub was expected to debut LP via Third Man Records.

== Musical equipment ==
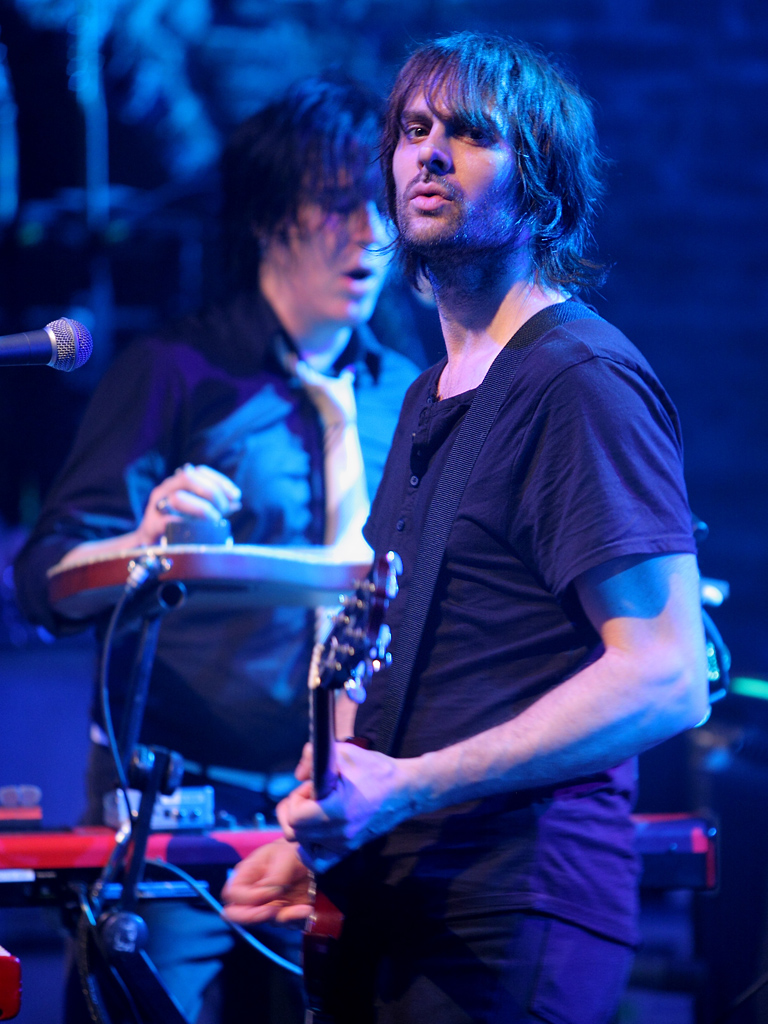
Fertita playing a Gibson SG

While playing with The Raconteurs Fertita primarily played a Fender Rhodes electric piano and a Korg synthesiser as well as a Gibson Hummingbird acoustic guitar. Fertita is also credited for playing clavinet on the band's second album, Consolers of the Lonely. With Queens of the Stone Age Fertita has been seen playing a Moog Little Phatty Synthesizer and a Clavia Nord Electro 2 through a set of Peavey amplifiers. However more recently he has been seen playing a Korg SV-1 and an unidentifiable electric piano as well as the Little Phatty.

For guitars, he has used a Gibson SG and Maton BB1200 through an Ampeg combo, but was seen playing a Yamaha hollowbody through a Fender Twin Reverb amplifier on their most recent tour. With The Dead Weather, Fertita plays a custom built Gretsch White Falcon originally built for a number of live performances by Jack White and Alicia Keys to perform the theme song for the James Bond film Quantum of Solace, "Another Way to Die".

For keyboards, he uses The Moog Little Phatty, A Wurlitzer Electric Piano, and a vintage Korg CX-3 organ. Fertita's pedalboard includes a Dunlop Rotovibe, a white painted DigiTech Whammy, a Voodoo Lab Tremolo, an Electro-Harmonix nano Bassballs, a white painted Big Muff, Micro POG, a Boss TU-2 Tuner, and a MXR Micro Amp. For amplification Fertita uses two Fender Twin Reverbs.

== Personal life ==
In 2009, Fertita married. He lives in Nashville, Tennessee.

== Discography ==
Appearances on albums

- 1993 – Reigndance – Problem Factory
- 1994 – Reigndance – Thread
- 1997 – Reigndance – MakeShift Gleam
- 2000 – The Waxwings – Low to the Ground
- 2002 – The Waxwings – Shadows of the Waxwings
- 2004 – The Waxwings – Lets Make Our Descent
- 2005 – Brendan Benson – Alternative To Love
- 2007 – Queens of the Stone Age – Era Vulgaris *
- 2008 – The Raconteurs – Consolers of the Lonely
- 2009 – The Dead Weather – Horehound
- 2009 – Hello=Fire – Hello=Fire
- 2009 – Brendan Benson – My Old, Familiar Friend
- 2009 – Karen O & the Kids – Where the Wild Things Are
- 2009 – The Dead Weather – Live at Third Man Records West
- 2010 – The Dead Weather – Sea of Cowards
- 2013 – Queens of the Stone Age – ...Like Clockwork
- 2013 – Brendan Benson – You Were Right
- 2014 – Jack White – Lazaretto
- 2014 – Karen O – Crush Songs
- 2014 – Olivia Jean – Bathtub Love Killings
- 2015 – The Dead Weather – Dodge and Burn
- 2016 - Iggy Pop - Post Pop Depression
- 2016 -The Kills - Ash & Ice
- 2017 - Queens of the Stone Age - Villains
- 2022 - Tropical Gothclub - Tropical Gothclub
- 2023 - Queens of the Stone Age - In Times New Roman...

*appears on bonus tracks.

- 2026 - Queens of the Stone Age - “Perfecth”

Appearances on singles

- 2004 – The Waxwings – "Leave Less Waiting"
- 2005 – Brendan Benson – "Cold Hands (Warm Heart)" **
- 2007 – Queens of the Stone Age – "Sick, Sick, Sick" **
- 2007 – Queens of the Stone Age – "3's & 7's" **
- 2007 – Queens of the Stone Age – "Make It Wit Chu" **
- 2009 – The Dead Weather – "Hang You from the Heavens"
- 2009 – The Dead Weather – "Treat Me Like Your Mother"
- 2009 – The Dead Weather – "I Cut Like A Buffalo"
- 2009 – Hello=Fire – "Nature of Our Minds"
- 2010 – The Dead Weather – "Die By The Drop"
- 2010 – The Dead Weather – "Blue Blood Blues"
- 2010 – The Dead Weather – "Gasoline"
- 2012 – Beck – "I Just Started Hating Some People Today" b/w "Blue Randy"
- 2013 – Hello=Fire – "Angle To See"
- 2014 – Hello=Fire – "Parallel"
- 2017 - Queens of the Stone Age - "The Way You Used to Do"
- 2017 - Queens of the Stone Age - "The Evil Has Landed"
- 2026 - Queens of the Stone Age - “Easy Street”
- 2026 - Queens of the Stone Age - “Insignificant Other”
- 2026 - Queens of the Stone Age - “Where The Goth Girls At?”

**appears on b-sides.
