= Mark Rankin (record engineer) =

- Born: England
- Genres: Alternative rock, pop
- Occupations: Record producer, audio engineer
- Years active: 2004–present
- Website: markrankin.co.uk

Mark Rankin is an English record producer and audio engineer. He has won two Grammy Awards for his work with Adele and has multiple nominations for his work with other artists including Queens of the Stone Age, Iggy Pop, Weezer, Florence and the Machine, and Foster the People.

== Career ==
Rankin started his studio career in the London Exchange Mastering Studios, with his first session being with electronic duo Basement Jaxx.

Rankin won The Music Producers Guild Award for Breakthrough Engineer of the Year in 2010.

In 2012, Rankin won two Grammy Awards: in the Album of the Year category with Adele's 21, and Record of the Year category with "Rolling in the Deep".

In 2014, he was nominated for The Music Producers Guild Award for Engineer of the Year. He also received two Grammy nominations for the Queens of the Stone Age album ...Like Clockwork, in categories Best Rock Album and Best Engineered Album, Non-Classical.

== Personal life ==
Rankin resides in Los Angeles with his wife and children.

== Engineering and mixing discography ==
Credits adapted from AllMusic.

- 2005: Bloc Party – Silent Alarm
- 2007: Kate Nash – Made of Bricks
- 2008: Bloc Party – Intimacy
- 2009: Florence and the Machine – Lungs
- 2009: Led Bib – Sensible Shoes
- 2009: Jack Peñate – Everything Is New
- 2010: Plan B – The Defamation of Strickland Banks
- 2010: CeeLo Green – The Lady Killer
- 2011: Adele – 21
- 2011: Foster the People – Torches
- 2011: Florence and the Machine – Ceremonials
- 2011: Adele – Live at the Royal Albert Hall
- 2012: The Big Pink – Future This
- 2012: The Invisible – Rispah
- 2012: Tyler James – A Place I Go
- 2013: Willy Moon – Here's Willy Moon
- 2013: Queens of the Stone Age – ...Like Clockwork
- 2013: AlunaGeorge – Body Music
- 2013: Eliza Doolittle – In Your Hands
- 2014: Bombay Bicycle Club – So Long, See You Tomorrow
- 2014: Nina Nesbitt – Peroxide
- 2014: The Hoosiers – The News from Nowhere
- 2017: Queens of the Stone Age – Villains
- 2018: Broods – Don't Feed the Pop Monster
- 2019: Weezer – Weezer
- 2019: Harry Styles – "Fine Line (Harry Styles album)"
- Unknown: 3LW – Got Me On Lock
- 2020: Elliphant – "Had Enough"
- 2021: Jarryd James – "P.M."
- 2021: Elliphant – "Could This Be Love"
- 2021: Elliphant – "Rocking Horse"
- 2021: Delta Goodrem – "Bridge over Troubled Dreams"
- 2021: Noah Kahan – "Part of Me"
- 2021: Frank Carter & The Rattlesnakes – "My Town"
- 2022: Spoon – Lucifer on the Sofa
- 2023: Queens of the Stone Age – In Times New Roman...
- 2025: Ghost – Skeletá
- 2025: Queens of the Stone Age – Alive in the Catacombs
- 2026: Queens of the Stone Age – Perfecth
