= Tyler Parkford =

American musician (born 1985)

- Born: Tyler Davis Parkford; Long Beach, California, U.S.
- Genres: Psychedelic pop; indie pop
- Occupations: Musician; songwriter
- Instruments: Vocals; keyboards

Tyler Davis Parkford is an American musician, best known as the keyboardist and vocalist for Los Angeles–based band Mini Mansions. He is also one half of the lounge pop duo Mister Goodnite, and a touring member of the British indie rock band Arctic Monkeys.

== Early life ==
Parkford grew up in Long Beach, California. He studied classical piano as a child and later learned to play the guitar. He attended film school at the University of California, Santa Cruz. It was there that he met future bandmate Zach Dawes. Along with Queens of the Stone Age bassist Michael Shuman, the trio formed Mini Mansions in 2009.

== Career ==
In 2013, Parkford teamed up with Drab Majesty’s Alex Nicolaou to form Mister Goodnite, a pop act that layers vocals over samples of retro pop, prog, and psych records. He described the concept behind the project as a man who dies and is doomed to spend eternity in purgatory as a lounge singer. Mister Goodnite's first mixtape, Songs About Love And Lack Thereof, was released in 2013. The first single, "Don't Trust Me", was released on September 4, 2013. A video for "You’re Too Cool" premiered on October 14, 2013.

Parkford contributed to the soundtrack of 2017 feature film Kate Can't Swim, and released a song from the soundtrack titled "Nothing In The Rain" in 2016.

Mister Goodnite released their second mixtape, Nite in the Attic, in 2017. The mixtape paid homage to Light in the Attic Records, with each song sampling a different record from the label's back catalogue. The lead single, "Fast Times in the LBC", was released on April 27, 2017. A video for "Old Enough" premiered on June 25, 2017. They released another single, "Adulteress", on July 2, 2017.

Parkford has been a touring member of The Last Shadow Puppets since 2016. He also appeared on the band's The Dream Synopsis EP.

He co-wrote three songs on Albert Hammond Jr.'s 2018 album, Francis Trouble.

In addition to appearing on Arctic Monkey's 2018 album, Tranquility Base Hotel & Casino, Parkford accompanied the band on their world tour, playing the keyboard and providing backing vocals. He has also toured with Sparks several times.

In 2021, Parkford released the song "I'm The Worst," under the moniker PARKFORD. He would go on to release four more songs under this name with the same album art in 2022.

== Discography ==
With Mini Mansions

- Mini Mansions EP (2009)
- Mini Mansions (2010)
- ... Besides ... EP (2012)
- The Great Pretenders (2015)
- Flashbacks: A Collection of B-Sides From The Great Pretenders (2016)
- Works Every Time EP (2018)
- Guy Walks Into a Bar... (2019)

Other appearances on albums

- Mister Goodnite – Songs About Love And Lack Thereof (2013)
- Brody Dalle – Diploid Love (2014)
- Kimbra – The Golden Echo (2014)
- Unloved – Guilty of Love (2016)
- The Last Shadow Puppets – The Dream Synopsis (2016)
- Mister Goodnite – Kate Can't Swim Original Soundtrack (2017)
- Mister Goodnite – Nite in the Attic (2017)
- Albert Hammond Jr. – Francis Trouble (2018)
- Arctic Monkeys – Tranquility Base Hotel & Casino (2018)
- Miles Kane – Coup de Grace (2018)
- Lana Del Rey – Norman Fucking Rockwell! (2019)
- Arctic Monkeys – The Car (2022)
