= The Car (album) =

2022 studio album by Arctic Monkeys

Studio album by Arctic Monkeys
- Released: 21 October 2022
- Recorded: 2021
- Studios: La Frette, Paris; Butley Priory, Suffolk; RAK, London (Note: Orchestra)
- Genres: Art rock; orchestral rock; baroque pop; funk; lounge pop
- Length: 37:18
- Label: Domino
- Producer: James Ford

Arctic Monkeys chronology
Live at the Royal Albert Hall (2020)	The Car (2022)

Singles from The Car
- 1. "There'd Better Be a Mirrorball" Released: 29 August 2022; 2. "Body Paint" Released: 29 September 2022; 3. "I Ain't Quite Where I Think I Am" Released: 18 October 2022

The Car is the seventh studio album by English rock band Arctic Monkeys, released on 21 October 2022 by Domino Recording Company. The album's songs were primarily written by frontman and guitarist Alex Turner in his Los Angeles home and Paris. It was produced in Suffolk, Paris and London by frequent Arctic Monkeys collaborator James Ford, alongside frequent guest musicians Tom Rowley, Loren Humphrey and Tyler Parkford, and arranged by Bridget Samuels, Ford and Turner. Drummer Matt Helders took the picture on the album cover, which depicts a white Toyota Camry in an otherwise empty parking garage on a Los Angeles rooftop. Its title refers to said cover and the abundance of vehicular references in the lyrics.

The Car builds upon the sound from the band's previous album, Tranquility Base Hotel & Casino (2018). It features a wide array of genres that include art rock, orchestral rock, lounge pop, baroque pop, and funk, as well as elements of jazz. It also draws influence from soul music, electronic music, glam rock, bossa nova, traditional pop and vintage film soundtracks. Its lyrical content explores nostalgia and show business, specifically the music and film industries.

The album received critical acclaim upon its release. Critics complimented the band's artistic progression, the album's production, and Turner's lyrics, though some felt the band's continued deviation from their earlier indie rock sound would remain polarising to longtime fans. It was nominated for the 2023 Ivor Novello Awards and the 2024 Grammy Award for Best Alternative Music Album, as well as being shortlisted for the 2023 Mercury Prize. The single "There'd Better Be a Mirrorball" was nominated for Best Alternative Music Performance at the 65th Annual Grammy Awards. The single "Body Paint" and song "Sculptures of Anything Goes" have been nominated for Best Alternative Music Performance and Best Rock Performance, respectively, at the 66th edition.

It became Arctic Monkeys' first album to not reach the top spot of the UK Albums Chart, debuting at number two in ten territories, including the UK, as Taylor Swift's Midnights occupied the top spot. It became the third best-selling vinyl record, as well as the best-selling cassette of 2022 in the country. The album was promoted by the singles "There'd Better Be a Mirrorball", "Body Paint" and "I Ain't Quite Where I Think I Am", all of which peaked within the top 25 on the UK Singles Chart, as well as by a global tour and multiple television appearances.

== Background and recording ==
The band's sixth studio album Tranquility Base Hotel & Casino was released in May 2018 to critical acclaim, but its stylistic deviation was polarizing for listeners. Right after the South American leg of the tour for that album ended, Turner began thinking of new music with the idea of writing "a song that could close the show". His intention was to return to a more guitar heavy sound, although not the one seen in previous album AM.

First attempts at writing for the album began in April and May 2019. Initial recordings happened in late 2019 at La Frette, with James Ford again as a producer, but were quickly discarded, with only an early version of track "Hello You" surviving those sessions. In 2020, Turner went back to Lunar Surface, his home studio in Los Angeles, at first, hell-bent on writing riffs and "making it louder", but the music "didn't want to go there". He wrote and recorded demo versions of the songs, written half on acoustic guitar, half on piano. The album direction was cemented when he landed on the instrumental section of opening track "There'd Better Be a Mirrorball."

After the lockdowns, in the summer of 2021, the band got together to record. They chose Butley Priory, an old monastery in Suffolk, as their new studio, after attending several events there. The decision was also inspired by The Great British Recording Studios, a book gifted to Turner by album engineer Loren Humphrey, where he saw pictures of the Stones Mobile Studio unit. With producer Ford, the band rented it out and transformed it into a studio, while also living on-site during the recording. Turner described the place as "remote", with the sessions reminding him of their first record, which was also partly recorded in the English countryside. Turner also recounts that there were "no distractions, like in the city. Extra focus, no prying eyes". Turner brought his 16mm film camera and captured footage of the band at work, and Ford was apparently happy with Turner's hobby, as it kept him away from meddling too much with the recording. In London, strings were recorded at RAK Studios' Studio 1 by Humphrey and Emma Marks and arranged by composer Bridget Samuels, Ford and Turner himself. Later, vocals and overdubs were recorded at La Frette Studios in October 2021.

== Composition ==
=== Musical style and influences ===
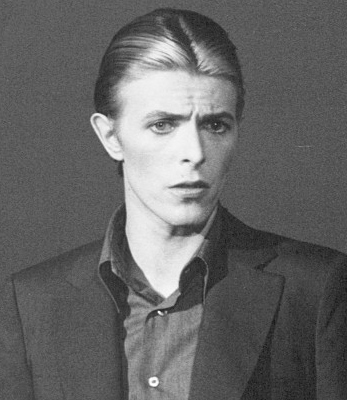
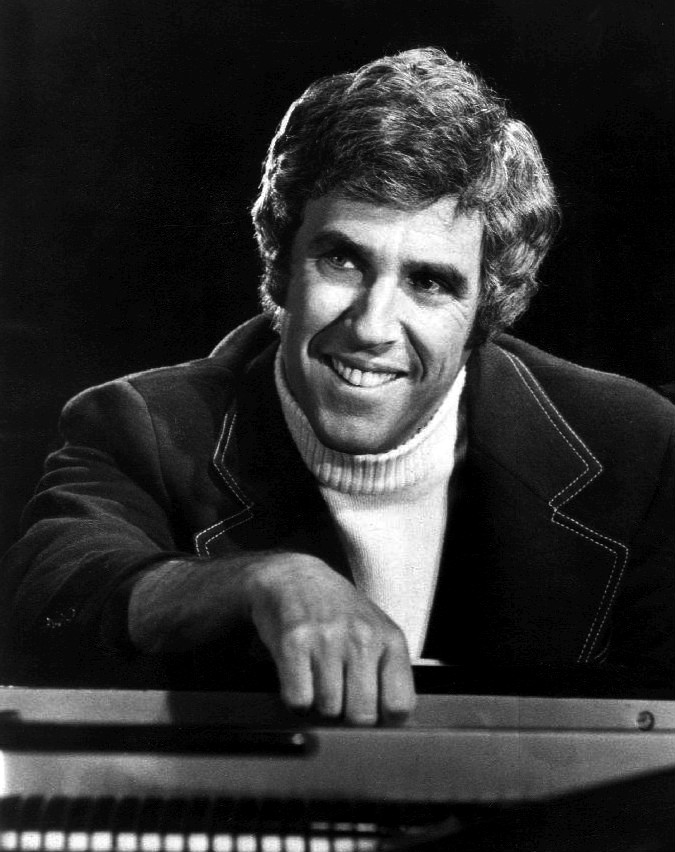
Several music critics cited David Bowie (left) and Burt Bacharach (right) as having influenced the album's style.

The Car builds up on the sound developed on Tranquility Base Hotel & Casino, although this time more accessible than the previous record. It has been characterised as art rock, orchestral rock, lounge pop, baroque pop and funk, The album further incorporates influences from jazz, soul music, electronic music, bossa nova, traditional pop, yacht rock and Italian film scores.

The album has been compared to the works of David Bowie, Burt Bacharach, Scott Walker, Roxy Music, John Barry, Portishead, Jarvis Cocker, Jean-Claude Vannier, Isaac Hayes, Curtis Mayfield, Steely Dan and Marvin Gaye, as well as James Bond soundtracks. Although Turner found it difficult to name direct musical influences, he mentioned the work of David Axelrod, Gloria Ann Taylor's "How Can You Say It" and Nat King Cole's "Where Did Everyone Go?" as inspirations for the record. Ford named Gaye and Mayfield as a direct influence on the production side, saying "the Marvin Gaye string line that he uses quite a lot, I have one hundred per cent tried to rip off several times".

=== Lyrics and themes ===
Unlike its predecessor, The Car is not a concept album. Lyrically, the album refers frequently to show business, specifically the music and film industries. It makes references to fame, creativity, the passage of time and nostalgia, audience expectations, espionage and disillusion. The album has been described as "cinematic" with Turner "assuming the meta-role of an artistically struggling movie director." It has also been noted as depicting "a decadent world of marble staircases, moated buildings, the popping of champagne corks and aeroplane descents over the French Riviera," as well as "the tensions between art and commerce, between performance and authenticity." Turner cited In the Blink of an Eye (1992) by Walter Murch as an inspiration and thought it felt "connected to the process and also the feel or lyrics on [The Car]." Other things Turner was reading at the time include Raymond Chandler's Philip Marlowe series, the works of David Foster Wallace and George Saunders.

== Artwork and title ==
The album's cover artwork was revealed on the same day of the album's announcement. The picture was taken by the band's drummer Matt Helders using a Leica M6 film camera and shows a white Toyota Camry parked alone on the rooftop of a parking garage in Los Angeles. Helders was testing an old 90mm lens he had just acquired, and decided to shoot the view from his old apartment window, inspired by the work of photographer William Eggleston. A series of pictures was taken and later shared with lead singer Alex Turner, who was also interested in photography. Turner became fixated on one shot featuring the car, and wrote a song inspired by it that would later become the title of the album.

== Release and promotion ==
In August 2021, Peter Harrison, the cook at Butley Priory in Suffolk, posted a photograph of himself with the band on his Instagram account. Several hours later the Butley Priory website confirmed the band had been recording there in June and July. In May 2022, drummer Matt Helders said the album "picks up where the other one left off musically" and that it's "never gonna be like 'R U Mine?' again." The album was announced on 24 August 2022 and was released on 21 October of the same year. To promote the record, a billboard hanging over the Central Library building in their native Sheffield was commissioned to feature the album cover art. Several other posters featuring the same artwork were seen in different countries with the title of the album being translated to other languages, such as German, Spanish, French, and Japanese. Before their last two shows in Sydney, the group announced a promotional pop-up shop, located at Golden Age Cinema and Bar, and included limited-edition merchandise, while the cinema itself screened some of the band's music videos.

=== Singles and videos ===
The album's lead single, "There'd Better Be a Mirrorball," was released with an accompanying music video, directed by lead singer Alex Turner, on 29 August 2022. The video features the band during the process of recording the album. Turner brought his own 16mm film camera to document the sessions, later compiling his footage for the video. The single debuted at number 26 on the UK Singles Chart.

On 29 September, the band released a music video for the album's fifth track, "Body Paint", directed by Brook Linder. Like its predecessor, the video was shot on film and inspired by the process of filmmaking and the creation of symbolic imagery. The track was announced as the album's second single alongside the release of the video.

Three days before the album release date, the band released their third single "I Ain't Quite Where I Think I Am", alongside a music video. The video featured a live rendition of the track, performed at Brooklyn's Kings Theatre on 22 September, and was directed by Ben Chappell & Zackery Michael.

On 6 March 2023, an official music video for the album's third track "Sculptures Of Anything Goes" was released on YouTube, directed again by Ben Chappell. The video features various scenes taken from some of the most recent tours the band has made around the world, as well as some other shots on film made specifically for the music video, once again keeping the cinematic ambiance of the record.

=== Tour ===
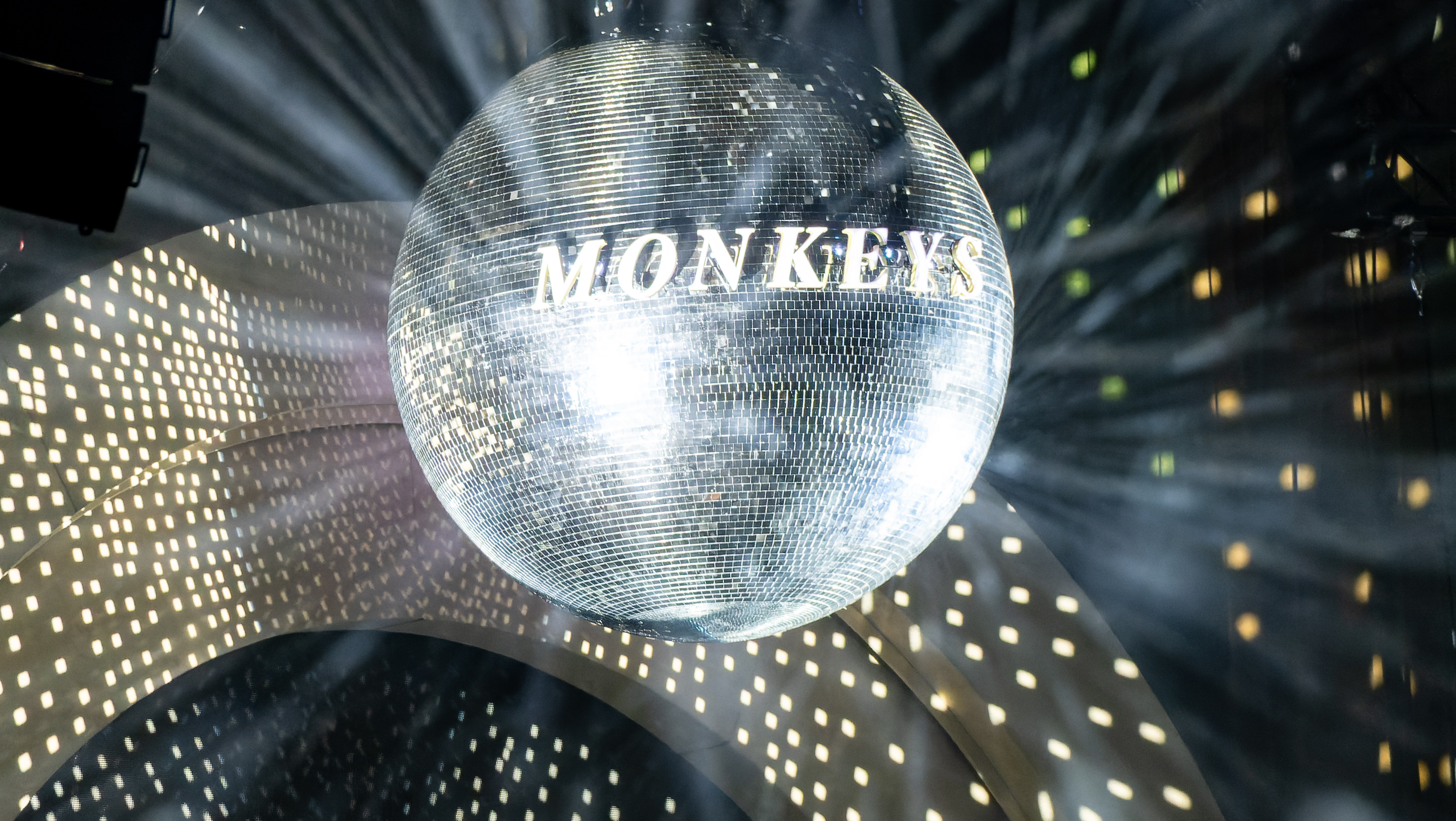
The mirrorball was part of the set designed by Turner for the stage

In November 2021, the band announced a tour of Europe which began in August. In April and June they extended the tour into November 2022, with dates added in the United States and England, as well as Latin America. On 9 August, the band played live in Istanbul. This was the tour's opening performance, and the Arctic Monkeys' first performance since 2019. No new songs were debuted until their performance at Zürich OpenAir Festival on 23 August, where they played "I Ain't Quite Where I Think I Am". Other tracks debuted during their first leg of tour include "Mr Schwartz", "Big Ideas" and "The Car", alongside singles "There'd Better Be A Mirrorball" and "Body Paint". In June 2022 the band announced shows in Australia, with support from Australian bands Mildlife, DMA's and The Buoys.

Their stadium tour was announced in September 2022, with dates in the UK, Ireland, North America, and Central Europe, finalizing in September 2023. Further European dates were added in December. The band's first ever tour of Asia was announced a few days later. The band also headlined several music festivals, including Sziget Festival, Lowlands, Pukkelpop, Rock en Seine, Reading and Leeds, Corona Capital, Rock Werchter, Bilbao BBK Live, NOS Alive, and different iterations of Primavera Sound and Falls Festival.

For the tour, the group are joined by longtime touring members Tom Rowley, Davey Latter, and Tyler Parkford.

The group released the concert film Arctic Monkeys at Kings Theatre on their YouTube channel in October 2022. The film was directed by Chappell and Zackery Michael, and features selected footage of the band, both backstage and performing, at their concert at Brooklyn's Kings Theatre.

=== Other performances ===
The band made a number of television performances in promotion of the album including on the late-night talk shows The Tonight Show Starring Jimmy Fallon, Late Night Berlin and The Jonathan Ross Show. After their performance on Late Night Berlin, the band played a secret show at the television studio, where they debuted the track "The Car". The show, which contained 13 songs, was broadcast in December 2022. In October, the band played an exclusive set at VRT Studios in Belgium for Studio Brussel and Dutch radio station NPO 3FM. Their setlist consisted mostly of early songs, as well as some songs from The Car. An audio-only recording of the performance was streamed on Studio Brussel the next day. That same month two other live sessions, recorded at RAK Studios, were broadcast by German and French radio stations 1LIVE and France Inter, respectively. In November, the music programme Later...with Jools Holland dedicated them an entire episode, the band played songs from the album as well as old tracks.

== Reception ==
=== Critical response ===
Professional ratings
Aggregate scores
Source	Rating
AnyDecentMusic?	7.9/10
Metacritic	82/100
Review scores
Source	Rating
AllMusic	3.5/5 stars
Clash	6/10
DIY	4/5 stars
The Guardian	4/5 stars
The Independent	4/5 stars
Mojo	4/5 stars
NME	5/5 stars
Pitchfork	8.0/10
Slant Magazine	3.5/5 stars
Uncut	8/10

The Car has received critical acclaim from music critics. At Metacritic, which assigns a normalised rating out of 100 to reviews from mainstream publications, the album received a score of 82, based on 25 reviews, indicating "universal acclaim".

Thomas Smith of NME thought the album best summarized the story of the band, "sharp songwriting, relentless innovation and unbreakable teamwork", adding that it would be a rewarding listen for old fans, as well as, a remarkable starting point for new ones. Ludovic Hunter-Tilney of Financial Times thought the band "doubled down on the stylistic swerve that they made on Tranquility Base Hotel & Casino" but was more positive to this record, saying "unlike its predecessor, the results do not exhaust or disappoint." Mark Beaumont of The Independent also compared the lyricism of both albums, describing it, as "roaring off in every direction, as wonderfully imaginistic as it is largely impenetrable", unlike, "the sci-fi framework" of the previous record. John Mulvey of Mojo thought the record was the "next logical step on from the cinematic sound world" built on Tranquility Base.

Alex Cabré of DIY praised the band "keenness to explore new styles" but doubted the album would reach the commercial success of their previous work. In an overwhelmingly positive review, Kate Solomon of i, called the album "swooningly glamorous and musically theatrical", comparing it to the diverse works of David Bowie, "With songs as simultaneously vast and focused as this, Arctic Monkeys can take their [Bowie Era] pick." Matthew Strauss of Pitchfork described The Car as "an album of love, longing, and doubt", and noted the music matched the uncertainty of the lyrics. On the mood of the album, Sam Richards of Uncut, felt it was "pretty bleak" and allowed "the lyrics to take hold" but thought the second half was not as varied as the first. For Paste Grant Sharples said it was "a joy to hear [the band] lean into their more recondite side, picking up where they left off four years ago" adding the band "transformed a once-antiquated object into something with modern panache".

Dan Cairns of The Sunday Times noted "a sameyness of texture, pacing and delivery" on the album and saw a lack of evolution, but praised the "beautiful" melodies of tracks "There'd Better be a Mirrorball" and "Big Ideas". In a similarly mixed review Andy Hill of Clash described the record as "exquisitely tailored, masterfully crafted. The heft, the sheen, the sheer bloody marquetry of it all is sublime", but dismissed the lyrics as going between "infuriatingly opaque" and "fourth-wall-breaking hater-baiting." Overall, he felt the band had taken a "wrong turn" with the album.

=== Accolades ===
The Car was nominated for the 2023 Ivor Novello Awards, an annual prize awarded for songwriting and composing, to the year's best British or Irish album. This became the band's sixth nomination for the award. The album was also shortlisted for the 2023 Mercury Prize, an annual prize awarded to the year's best British or Irish album based solely on said album's merit, regardless of an act's popularity or previous general success. This became the band's fifth nomination for the award: the joint-most nominations received by any act alongside Radiohead. The album was nominated for Best Alternative Music Album at the 66th Annual Grammy Awards, the songs "Sculptures of Anything Goes" and "Body Paint" were also nominated in the Best Rock Performance, and Best Alternative Music Performance categories, respectively. Previously, the single "There'd Better Be a Mirrorball" was nominated for Best Alternative Music Performance at the 65th edition.

The album also appeared on numerous year-end lists. At Album of the Year, which creates an aggregate of music critic's year-end lists, The Car was listed as the twenty-fourth best album of the year, with NME and Time Out naming it the best album of 2022. Riot Mag also listed The Car as the year's second best album. Publications including Mojo, DIY, The Sunday Times, and Kitty Empire of The Observer included the album in the top five of their year-end lists, with Oor, The Guardian, and BBC Radio 6 Music including the album in their top ten.

Publication	List	Rank
Billboard	The 50 Best Albums of 2022	23
The LA Times	Top 20 Albums of 2022	20–10
Mojo	75 Best Albums of 2022	5
NME	The 50 Best Albums of 2022	1
Pitchfork	The Best Music of 2022: Readers' Poll	20
Pitchfork	The 38 Best Rock Albums of 2022	N/A
Vogue	Top 20 Albums of 2022	-
DIY	DIY's Albums of 2022	5
Under the Radar	The 100 Best Albums of 2022	54
Uproxx	The Best Indie Albums of 2022	N/A
Time Out	The 20 best albums of 2022	1
Riot Mag	RIOT's Albums of the Year 2022	2
The Sunday Times	Ranked: 25 best albums of 2022	5
The Observer	Music: Kitty Empire's 10 best albums of 2022	5
The Guardian	The 50 best albums of 2022	6
BBC Radio 6 Music	BBC Radio 6 Music's Album Of The Year 2022	9

=== Commercial performance ===
The Car peaked at number two in various territories, prevented from debuting at the top spot by American singer-songwriter Taylor Swift's Midnights. Their chart race in the United Kingdom, especially, was widely covered. The Car debuted at number two on the UK Albums Chart with 119,016 units, becoming Arctic Monkeys' first album to not reach the top spot and terminating their six-album streak. The album peaked at number two in Australia, Belgium, the Netherlands, France, Ireland, Lithuania, New Zealand, and Scotland as well. The Car became the third best selling vinyl album, as well as the best selling cassette of 2022 in the UK.

== Track listing ==
All tracks are written by Alex Turner, except where noted.

The Car track listing
No.	Title	Writer(s)	Length
1.	"There'd Better Be a Mirrorball"		4:25
2.	"I Ain't Quite Where I Think I Am"		3:11
3.	"Sculptures of Anything Goes"	Turner; Jamie Cook	3:59
4.	"Jet Skis on the Moat"	Turner; Tom Rowley	3:17
5.	"Body Paint"		4:50
6.	"The Car"		3:19
7.	"Big Ideas"		3:57
8.	"Hello You"		4:04
9.	"Mr Schwartz"	Turner; Rowley	3:30
10.	"Perfect Sense"		2:47
Total length:			37:19

== Personnel ==
Personnel adapted from The Car liner notes, except where noted.

Arctic Monkeys

- Alex Turner – vocals, guitars, keyboards, piano, synthesisers, drums, string arrangements
- Jamie Cook – guitar, synthesiser, organ, slide guitar, drum machine on "Sculptures of Anything Goes"
- Nick O'Malley – bass guitar
- Matt Helders – drums, keyboards on "Hello You"

Additional performers

- Tom Rowley – guitars
- James Ford
- Tyler Parkford – backing vocals
- Orchestrate – strings

Technical personnel

- James Ford – production, mixing, string arrangements
- Loren Humphrey – recording, orchestra recording
- Anthony Cazade – recording
- Matt Colton – mastering
- Bridget Samuels – string arrangements
- Emma Marks – orchestra recording
- Matt Helders – photography
- Matthew Cooper – design
- Alex Turner – design

== Charts ==
=== Weekly charts ===
Weekly chart performance for The Car
Chart (2022)	Peak position
Australian Albums (ARIA)	2
Austrian Albums (Ö3 Austria)	3
Belgian Albums (Ultratop Flanders)	2
Belgian Albums (Ultratop Wallonia)	2
Canadian Albums (Billboard)	6
Croatian International Albums (HDU)	1
Danish Albums (Hitlisten)	5
Dutch Albums (Album Top 100)	2
Finnish Albums (Suomen virallinen lista)	5
French Albums (SNEP)	2
German Albums (Offizielle Top 100)	5
Hungarian Albums (MAHASZ)	18
Icelandic Albums (Tónlistinn)	16
Irish Albums (Official Charts)	2
Italian Albums (FIMI)	6
Japanese Albums (Oricon)	18
Japanese Hot Albums (Billboard Japan)	16
Lithuanian Albums (AGATA)	2
New Zealand Albums (RMNZ)	2
Norwegian Albums (VG-lista)	8
Polish Albums (ZPAV)	8
Portuguese Albums (AFP)	2
Scottish Albums (Official Charts)	2
Spanish Albums (Promusicae)	3
Swedish Albums (Sverigetopplistan)	8
Swiss Albums (Schweizer Hitparade)	3
UK Albums (Official Charts)	2
UK Independent Albums (Official Charts)	1
Uruguayan Albums (CUD)	11
US Billboard 200	6
US Top Alternative Albums (Billboard)	1
US Top Rock Albums (Billboard)	1

=== Year-end charts ===
Year-end chart performance for The Car
Chart (2022)	Position
Belgian Albums (Ultratop Flanders)	46
Belgian Albums (Ultratop Wallonia)	160
Dutch Albums (Album Top 100)	77
Portuguese Albums (AFP)	14
Spanish Albums (PROMUSICAE)	87
UK Albums (OCC)	17

Chart (2023)	Position
Belgian Albums (Ultratop Flanders)	170

== Certifications ==
Certifications and sales for The Car
Region	Certification	Certified units/sales
United Kingdom (BPI)	Gold	231,000
