= Any Emotions =

Single by Mini Mansions featuring Brian Wilson

from the album The Great Pretenders
- B-side: "Geronimo"
- Released: January 13, 2015
- Genre: Indie pop; psychedelic pop; new wave
- Length: 3:10
- Label: Capitol
- Songwriters: Zach Dawes, Tyler Parkford, Michael Shuman

Mini Mansions singles chronology
"Death Is a Girl" (2014)	"Any Emotions" (2015)	"Freakout!" (2015)

Music video
- "Any Emotions" on YouTube

"Any Emotions" is a single by American band Mini Mansions, featuring Brian Wilson. Released on January 13, 2015, it is the second single released in promotion for the band's second LP The Great Pretenders. Wilson's involvement came after bassist Zach Dawes connected with him during the recording of No Pier Pressure. According to Dawes:

"We got along great and I went straight to Vox Studios from that session where the boys were doing vocals for ‘Any Emotions.’ As they got into harmonies Brian’s name came up kind of as a pie in the sky idea. I followed up with him and sent him a rough cut of the song. Then that rare moment occurred where the idealised version of something becomes a reality and Brian Wilson served up an endless helping of apple pie a la mode. We are forever grateful for his presence, genius, and generosity."

The vinyl single was initially mispressed with the tracks from Boston hardcore punk band Siege's Lost Session '91 7".
