= There'd Better Be a Mirrorball =

Single by Arctic Monkeys

from the album The Car
- Released: 29 August 2022
- Recorded: 2021
- Genre: Traditional pop; jazz
- Length: 4:25
- Label: Domino
- Songwriter(s): Alex Turner
- Producer(s): James Ford

Arctic Monkeys singles chronology
"Tranquility Base Hotel & Casino" (2018)	"There'd Better Be a Mirrorball" (2022)	"Body Paint" (2022)

Music video
- "There'd Better Be a Mirrorball" on YouTube

"There'd Better Be a Mirrorball" is a song by English indie rock band Arctic Monkeys released on 29 August 2022, through Domino Recording Company. The song was included on their seventh studio album The Car (2022). Written by lead singer Alex Turner and produced by James Ford, "There'd Better Be a Mirrorball" is a traditional pop and jazz track. While composing it, Turner thought the song felt like the start of the record.

Music critics praised "There'd Better Be a Mirrorball"'s production, lyrics, and instrumental arrangement. The song was nominated for Best Alternative Music Performance at the 65th Annual Grammy Awards. It debuted at number 26 on the UK Singles Chart.

Turner directed the accompanying music video which features 1970s-inspired aesthetics and captures the band at different stages of the recording process. The video was also released on 29 August 2022, and filmed by Turner with his own 16 mm video camera, alongside Zackery Michael, Ben Chappell and Mark Bull. Arctic Monkeys performed the song on television shows including Later...with Jools Holland and Late Night Berlin.

== Composition and lyrics ==
Musically "There'd Better Be a Mirrorball" has been described as a jazz-influenced and "Bond-esque" ballad, being compared to the works of Burt Bacharach and The Walker Brothers. Some music journalists also noted an influence of 1960s pop music and traditional pop on the song.

The song deals with a breakup, and the lyricism has been described as "oblique" and "introspective", with The Guardian noting: "Turner sings about the dying days of a relationship without any of his usual brio. Instead, this song's refrain almost feels like a plea: 'If you wanna walk me to the car / You oughta know I'll have a heavy heart / So can we please be absolutely sure that there's a mirrorball?'" Lead singer Alex Turner said of the song: "On Mirrorball, before the words even come in, that instrumental piece [establishes] the feel of the record", and while composing it thought it felt, "like how the next record starts."

The string section was recorded at RAK Studios' Studio 1 in London, engineered by long-time Arctic Monkeys collaborator Loren Humphrey.

== Music video ==
The song's music video was directed by Turner and filmed by him and frequent collaborators Zackery Michael, Ben Chappell and Mark Bull. The video features the band at different stages of the recording process, at both Butley Priory and La Frette studios. Turner brought his own 16 mm video camera to document the sessions, later compiling his footage for the video.

== Critical reception ==
Professional ratings
Review scores
Source	Rating
The Guardian	4/5 stars
NME	5/5 stars

Writing for Pitchfork, Matthew Strauss noted that the song's production "gesture[s] toward the otherworldly retroism of Tranquility Base Hotel & Casino" while remaining "grounded" lyrically; he opines that the song is "emblematic of a new, post-AM Arctic Monkeys: a little mysterious, yearning, and downcast - and quietly beautiful." Shaad D'Souza of The Guardian wrote, "Arctic Monkeys are clearly still invested in writing ballads that move with the slowness and smoothness of treacle dripping from a spoon. "There'd Better Be a Mirrorball" seems slight at first – but by the time it's over, there's no doubting its power." Stereogum chose the song as one of the best tracks of that week, describing it as "[splitting] the difference between Bond theme and brokenhearted lament" with "Alex Turner's croon leading the way through exquisite lounge music and a soaring string arrangement."

=== Accolades ===
The song was nominated for Best Alternative Music Performance at the 65th Annual Grammy Awards.

Publication	Rank	List
Billboard	45	The 100 Best Songs of 2022
Consequence	40	Top 50 Songs of 2022
The Guardian	6	The 20 Best Songs of 2022
NME	5	The 50 best songs of 2022
Stereogum	-	Our 50 Favorite Songs Of 2022

== Charts ==
Chart performance for "There'd Better Be a Mirrorball"
Chart (2022)	Peak position
Greece International (IFPI)	76
Ireland (IRMA)	31
Lithuania (AGATA)	100
New Zealand Hot Singles (RMNZ)	16
Portugal (AFP)	68
UK Singles (OCC)	25
UK Indie (OCC)	2
US Hot Rock & Alternative Songs (Billboard)	37

== Certifications ==
Certifications for "There'd Better Be a Mirrorball"
Region	Certification	Certified units/sales
United Kingdom (BPI)	Silver	200,000^{‡}
^{‡} Sales+streaming figures based on certification alone.
