= Guy Walks into a Bar... (album) =

Studio album by Mini Mansions
- Released: July 26, 2019
- Recorded: 2015–2018
- Studio: Barefoot (Hollywood)
- Genres: Indie rock; new wave; post-punk revival
- Length: 44:54
- Label: Fiction
- Producers: Michael Shuman; Cian Riordan

Mini Mansions chronology
The Great Pretenders (2015)	Guy Walks into a Bar... (2019)

Singles from Guy Walks into a Bar...
- 1. "GummyBear" Released: February 12, 2019; 2. "Hey Lover" Released: March 27, 2019; 3. "Bad Things (That Make You Feel Good)" Released: April 29, 2019; 4. "I'm in Love" Released: June 10, 2019

Guy Walks into a Bar... is the third album by American band Mini Mansions, released on July 26, 2019. It includes the single "GummyBear".

== Background ==
The album's recording started in December 2015 and, as the band members were occupied with separate projects—such as Michael Shuman in Queens of the Stone Age and Zach Dawes and Tyler Parkford playing live with The Last Shadow Puppets and Arctic Monkeys—recording was finished in 2018. It was written with a "narrative about love in mind", and vocalist Michael Shuman based the lyrics off a relationship he had, "from beginning honeymoon phase jitters to the process of breaking up".

The singles off the record were first played when Mini Mansions opened for Arctic Monkeys on the Australia/ New Zealand leg of the Tranquility Base Hotel and Casino tour.

== Reception ==
Professional ratings
Aggregate scores
Source	Rating
Metacritic	79/100
Review scores
Source	Rating
AllMusic	4/5 stars
Gigwise	7/10 stars
The Independent	4/5 stars
The Music	4/5 stars

Guy Walks into a Bar... has received generally positive reviews by critics with a total score of 79/100 on Metacritic, with Roisin O'Connor of The Independent writing that the album features "sprawling, psychedelic pop to scuzzy post-punk and rock references" and has a "superb dynamic that holds the listener's attention, while the band navigate through a single, tumultuous relationship". Clash called the album an "infectious return, one delivered with confidence and panache. The band's superb songwriting remains intact, while the production has been amplified soaking up fresh elements in the process."

== Track listing ==
All tracks are written by Mini Mansions, except "Hey Lover" by Mini Mansions and Alison Mosshart.

No.	Title	Length
1.	"Should Be Dancing"	4:29
2.	"Bad Things (That Make You Feel Good)"	3:01
3.	"Don't Even Know You"	3:36
4.	"Forgot Your Name"	3:02
5.	"I'm in Love"	3:27
6.	"Time Machine"	3:38
7.	"Works Every Time"	4:37
8.	"Living in the Future"	4:21
9.	"GummyBear"	4:02
10.	"Hey Lover" (featuring Alison Mosshart)	5:45
11.	"Tears in Her Eyes"	4:56
Total length:		44:54

== Personnel ==
Personnel taken from Guy Walks into a Bar… liner notes.

Mini Mansions

- Zach Dawes – bass guitar, keyboards
- Tyler Parkford – vocals, keyboards, guitar
- Michael Shuman — vocals, guitar, bass guitar, keyboards, drums

Additional musicians

- Jon Theodore – drums (all except "I'm in Love")
- Dash Hutton – additional drums on "I'm in Love"
- Alison Mosshart – vocals on "Hey Lover"
- Z Berg – backing vocals on "Forgot Your Name" and "Living in the Future"
- Kaylie Schiff – backing vocals on "Forgot Your Name" and "Living in the Future"
- Melodye Perry – backing vocals on "Time Machine", "Works Every Time", and "Hey Lover"
- Táta Vega – backing vocals on "Time Machine", "Works Every Time", and "Hey Lover"

Production

- Michael Shuman – production
- Cian Riordan – production, engineering, mixing
- Jonathan Sterling – additional engineering
- Emily Lazar – mastering
- Chris Allgood – additional mastering
