= Body Paint (song) =

Single by Arctic Monkeys

from the album The Car
- Released: 29 September 2022
- Recorded: 2021
- Genre: Baroque pop; orchestral pop; art rock
- Length: 4:35
- Label: Domino
- Songwriter: Alex Turner
- Producer: James Ford

Arctic Monkeys singles chronology
"There'd Better Be a Mirrorball" (2022)	"Body Paint" (2022)	"I Ain't Quite Where I Think I Am" (2022)

Music video
- "Body Paint" on YouTube

"Body Paint" is a song by English indie rock band Arctic Monkeys released on 29 September 2022, through Domino Recording Company. The song was included as the second single on their seventh studio album The Car. Written by lead singer Alex Turner and produced by James Ford, "Body Paint" is a baroque pop, orchestral pop, and art rock track.

Music critics praised "Body Paint"'s production, instrumental arrangement, and vocals. Comparing the song to works by The Beatles, Burt Bacharach, and David Bowie. The song has been nominated for Best Alternative Music Performance at the 66th Annual Grammy Awards. It debuted at number 22 on the UK Singles Chart.

The accompanying music video was directed by Brook Linder with Ben Chappell serving as creative director. The video features an editing room where a screen shows different scenes, interspersed with footage of the band playing in a film studio. Visually it is inspired by the works of Alan Pakula made in collaboration with director of photography, Gordon Willis. The video was shot on film, specifically on Ektachrome, as a requirement of Turner and Chappell. Arctic Monkeys performed the song on television shows such as The Tonight Show Starring Jimmy Fallon, The Jonathan Ross Show, Later...with Jools Holland and Late Night Berlin.

== Composition and lyrics ==
Musically the song has been described as a "lounge-y piano ballad", and Beatlesque, with "gorgeous string arrangements" reminiscent of Burt Bacharach and George Martin's work with said group. The band has been said as being "in introspective lounge lizard mode over sparkling piano and slowed-down drums." Robin Murray of Clash, thought there was a "sense of Bowie's mid 70s peak in the arrangement", and that the song "Split in two by that guitar solo", finds the band, "moving in a sensual, yet utterly insular, path." The second half of the song features "gritty guitars" that "push the song into a slightly more rocking direction."

About the chorus, "Straight from the cover shoot / There's still a trace of body paint / On your legs and on your arms and on your face", lead singer Alex Turner said, "Not exactly what you'd imagine singing over the loud bit–But it's as much about the musical ideas as the lyrics".

== Music video ==
The song's music video was directed by Brook Linder with Ben Chappell serving as creative director. The video was filmed between London and Missouri, and features an editing room where a screen shows different scenes, such as a man looking at a helicopter, or a tanning booth, interspersed with footage of the band playing in a film studio. Consequence noted that the video "Uses motifs of going around in circles and screens-within-screens to tease out the themes of the lyrics." Director Brook Linder said about the video: "Is very much about visualizing the process of filmmaking and specifically the creation of symbolic imagery (and where that process can fall apart). There is a code to be deciphered and everything has a specific meaning, but mostly it’s the code-making itself that’s on display." Visually it is inspired by 1960s live television performances and the works of Alan Pakula made in collaboration with director of photography, Gordon Willis, specifically The Parallax View. The sequence that recreates a zoetrope, came to Linder in a dream. The video was shot on film, which Linder thought "became absolutely necessary because it was inextricable from the concept of the piece itself." Although he noted the difficulty of shooting on Ektachrome, which was a requirement of Turner and Chappell, he was happy with the final result: "I was dead wrong, basically. It looks like the thing we’ve been chasing forever. They were right." The cameras used were the ARRI 416 and the Canon Scoopic or Bolex for the vignettes.

== Critical reception ==
Professional ratings
Review scores
Source	Rating
NME	4/5 stars

For NME, Erica Campbell wrote, "[Body Paint] may conjure up all the stirring emotions from ‘TBH&C’ but the riveting track is proof that the band have no issue creating something otherworldly, even when the subject matter is far closer to earth." Wren Graves of Consequence thought that "Despite Turner’s previous remarks that this album will be 'louder,' [Body Paint] suggests that they're still interested in beauty over bangers". Matt Mitchell of Flood Magazine noted the track "Finds frontman Alex Turner exploring the open spaces of his own vocal range, opting for a lush falsetto mixed with a tenor croon draped in orchestral strings", and described "Body Paint" as "Anthemic and stadium-esque, as its slow-burn melodies transform suddenly into gigantic, pulsing guitars." Robert Oliver of Metro found the song "featured the unexpected hallmarks of smooth soul acts from the 1970s: silky and sensual vocals from Alex Turner, lush and sweeping string flourishes, and an intimate and seductive rhythm section", and compared it to the earliest works of Minnie Riperton, The Stylistics, and Isaac Hayes.

=== Accolades ===
The song was nominated for Best Alternative Music Performance at the 66th Annual Grammy Awards.

Publication	Rank	List
The Guardian	11	The 20 Best Songs of 2022
NME	24	The 50 best songs of 2022
Pitchfork	65	The 100 Best Songs of 2022

== Charts ==
Chart performance for "Body Paint"
Chart (2022)	Peak position
Greece International (IFPI)	74
Ireland (IRMA)	44
Lithuania (AGATA)	97
New Zealand Hot Singles (RMNZ)	22
Portugal (AFP)	54
UK Singles (Official Charts)	22
UK Indie (Official Charts)	1

== Certifications ==
Certifications for "Body Paint"
Region	Certification	Certified units/sales
United Kingdom (BPI)	Silver	200,000^{‡}
^{‡} Sales+streaming figures based on certification alone.
