= Sculptures of Anything Goes =

Song by Arctic Monkeys

from the album The Car
- Published: Domino
- Released: 21 October 2022 (album); 6 March 2023 (video)
- Recorded: 2021
- Genre: Art rock; electro-industrial; gothic rock
- Length: 3:59
- Label: Domino
- Songwriters: Alex Turner; Jamie Cook
- Producer: James Ford

Music video
- "Sculptures of Anything Goes" on YouTube

"Sculptures of Anything Goes" is a song by English rock band Arctic Monkeys, released by Domino Recording Company on 21 October 2022 as the third track on their seventh studio album The Car (2022). It was produced by James Ford and written by lead singer Alex Turner and guitarist Jamie Cook.

Music critics noted the stylistical departure taken with "Sculptures of Anything Goes" towards a darker, and more electronic sound, in contrast to the more classical sounds found on the album. The song was compared to the late works of Portishead. The track was nominated for Best Rock Performance at the 66th Annual Grammy Awards. It debuted at number 5 on the UK Indie Chart.

== Background ==
Prior to the release of The Car, in a NPO 3FM interview Alex Turner described the track as being reminiscent of their fifth studio album AM (2013). He explained how the track reminded him of the desert-ier songs off of AM, and how it feels like there is a "bit of that dust in there." According to Turner, the song came about after Jamie Cook got a Moog synthesiser and put a drum machine through it. Following that, they wrote a song based on the sound it made. Following that Turner exclaimed:

“We wrote a song based off that, really… is the succinct answer. It started there [and then] it became a million other things. There were multiple different versions, and it ended up kind of back where it started… having had a haircut"

In that same interview, drummer Matt Helders said that they were rehearsing a live version of that track, stating that it was a very fun song to play live.

== Composition ==
Musically the song has been described as having "gothic synths" starting with a "menacing trip-hop drone" and "a brooding electronic beat and breathy, high vocals." as well as "drifting in a retro-futuristic vibe." The beat was also noted as "industrial," and "dystopia-esque," being compared to Portishead's "Machine Gun" (2008). The track is ominous, darker, and more brooding compared to the rest of the album, being the only song that, "ventures far from the Vegas strip."

Lyrically, it features "cryptic verses about fakeness and truth," which have been said to be, "a regular theme in Turner’s writing," combined with "a return to self-reflection." Other critics found references to the public's mixed response towards the band's previous album Tranquility Base Hotel & Casino (2018).

== Music video ==
A music video was released on 6 March 2023. Directed by Ben Chappel and edited by Matt Cronin, it was filmed during the band's Australia and South America tour in promotion of The Car. The video has been described as having a psych rock retro-aesthetic with grainy film footage. The track also features visuals & footage of the band during live shows.

== Accolades ==
The song was nominated for Best Rock Performance at the 66th Annual Grammy Awards.

== Charts ==
Chart Performance for "Sculptures of Anything Goes"
Chart (2022)	Peak position
UK Indie (OCC)	5
UK Streaming (OCC)	56
IFPI Digital Singles Chart	75
Ireland (IRMA)	32
