= Dolceola =

Musical instrument

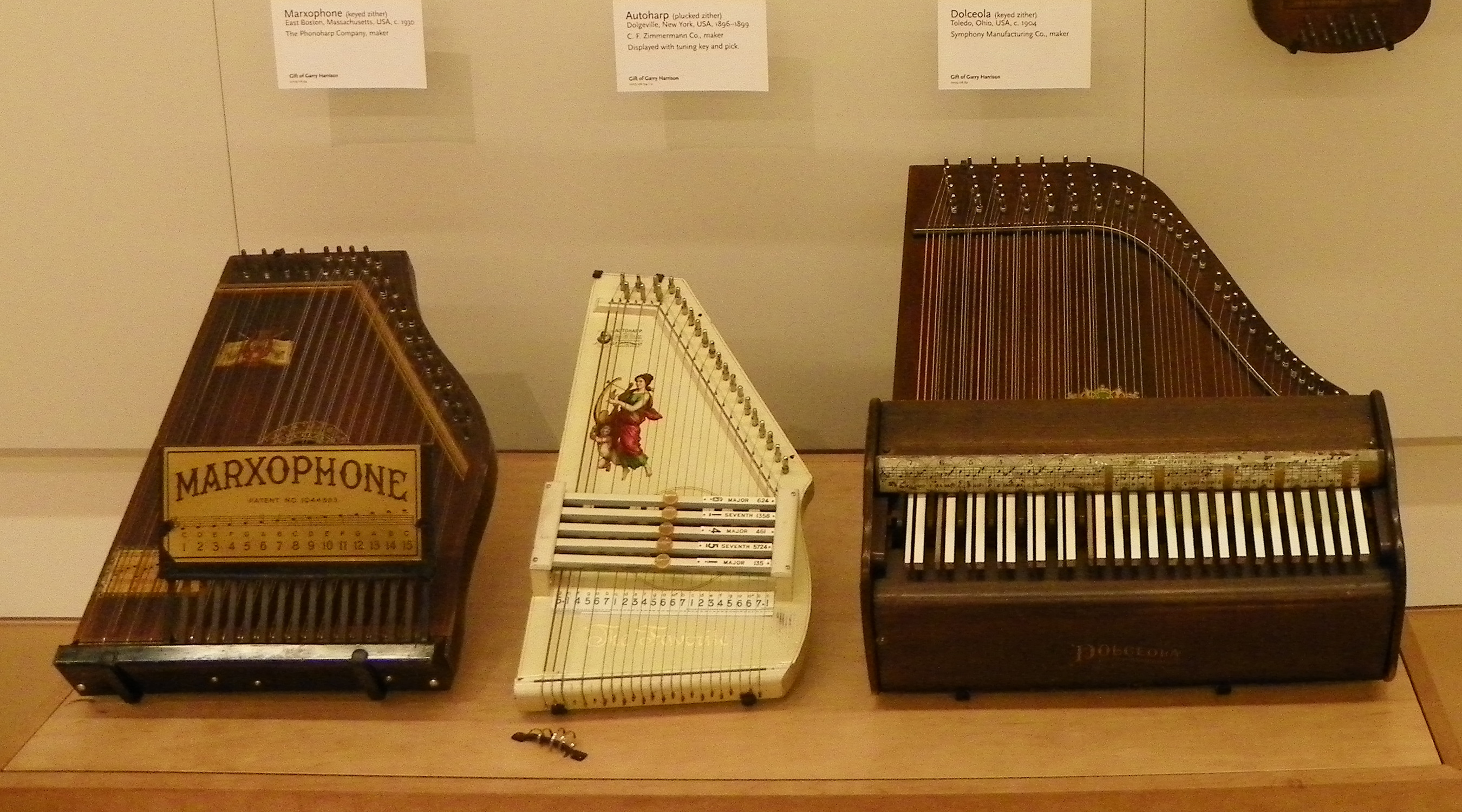
Dolceola (at far right)

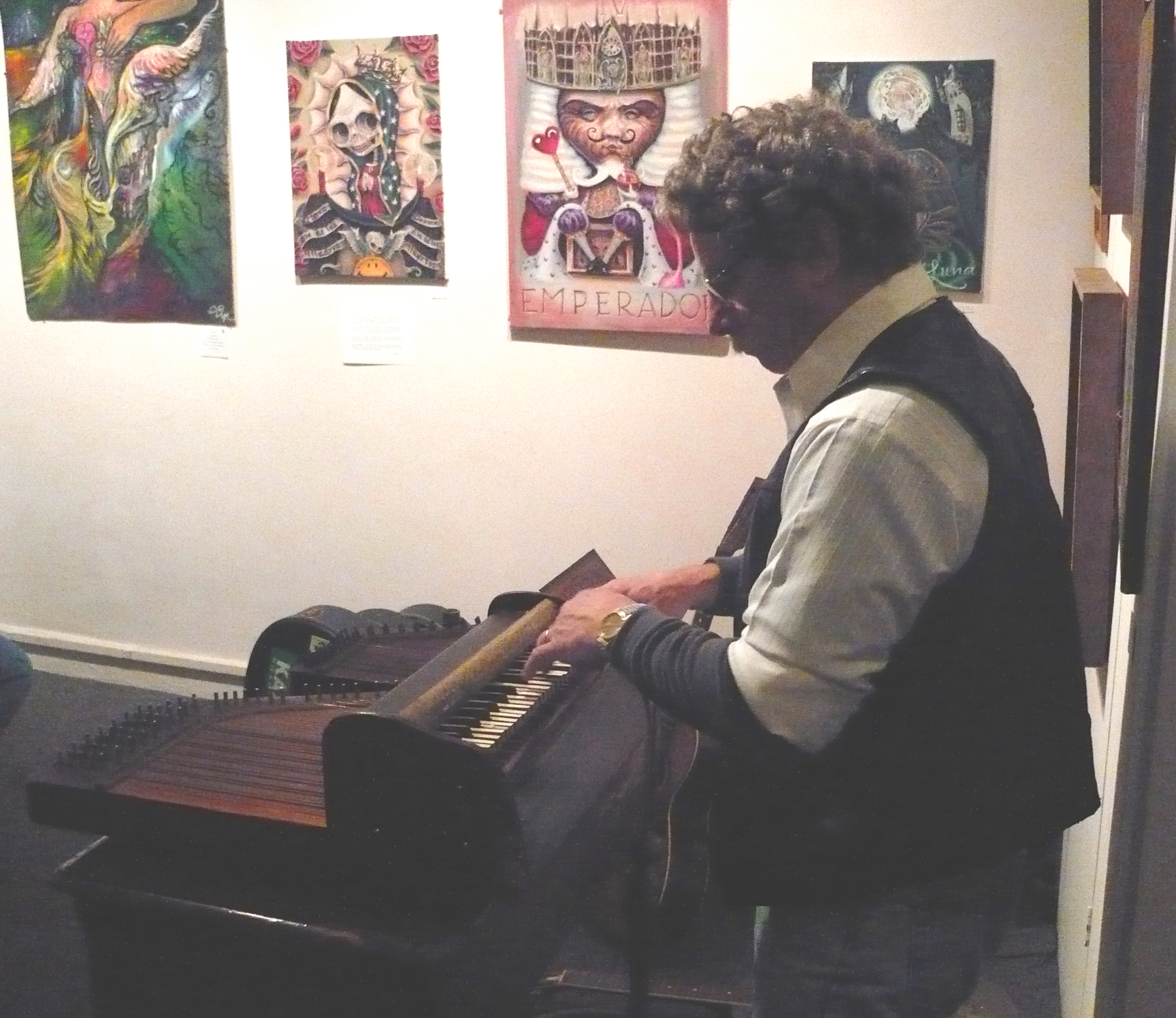
Andy Cohen playing a dolceola

A dolceola is a musical instrument resembling a miniature piano, but which is in fact a distinct type of zither with a keyboard. It has an unusual, angelic, music-box sound. Dolceolas were made by the Toledo Symphony Company from 1903 to 1907.

== Performers ==
Paul Mason Howard accompanied Lead Belly on dolceola on some of his 1944 Capitol Records sides. A listen to those recordings, collected under the title Grasshoppers In My Pillow, reveals the characteristic clatter of the dolceola's three-level keyboard action.

The gospel and gospel blues musician Washington Phillips (1880–1954) has been said to have played a dolceola on his recordings, but his instrument was in fact called a "dulceola", and was a home-made fingered fretless zither.

Alex Turner of English band Arctic Monkeys plays the dolceola on the band's 2018 album Tranquility Base Hotel & Casino.

Jim Dickinson plays the dolceola in Ry Cooder’s Crossroads.

== See also ==
- Autoharp
- Marxophone
