= The Great Pretenders =

Studio album by Mini Mansions
- Released: March 23, 2015
- Recorded: 2013–2014
- Genre: Indie pop; indie rock; new wave; synthpop; psychedelic pop
- Length: 45:58
- Label: Electromagnetic Recordings via: Capitol Records (US); Fiction Records (UK)
- Producer: Mini Mansions

Mini Mansions chronology
Mini Mansions (2010)	The Great Pretenders (2015)	Guy Walks Into a Bar... (2019)

Singles from The Great Pretenders
- 1. "Death Is a Girl" Released: 21 October 2014; 2. "Any Emotions" Released: 13 January 2015; 3. "Freakout!" Released: 3 February 2015; 4. "Vertigo" Released: 10 March 2015

The Great Pretenders is the second album by Los Angeles band Mini Mansions. It was released on March 23, 2015. The album cover alludes to the cover of the Voyager Golden Record.

== Reception ==
Professional ratings
Aggregate scores
Source	Rating
Metacritic	84/100
Review scores
Source	Rating
DIY	(4/5)
Drowned in Sound	8/10
Mojo	4/5 stars
musicOMH	3.5/5 stars
NME	(9/10)
Uncut	4/5 stars

The Great Pretenders received great acclaim from contemporary music critics. At Metacritic, which assigns a normalized rating out of 100 to reviews from mainstream critics, the album received an average score of 84, based on 7 reviews, which indicates "universal acclaim".

== Track listing ==
All tracks are written by Mini Mansions, except "Vertigo" written by Mini Mansions and Alex Turner.

No.	Title	Length
1.	"Freakout!"	4:28
2.	"Death Is a Girl"	4:36
3.	"Creeps"	3:31
4.	"Fantasy"	3:28
5.	"Any Emotions" (featuring Brian Wilson)	3:15
6.	"Vertigo" (featuring Alex Turner)	4:56
7.	"Honey, I'm Home"	4:52
8.	"Mirror Mountain"	4:36
9.	"Heart of Stone"	3:12
10.	"Double Visions"	3:02
11.	"The End, Again"	5:01
Total length:		45:58

== Personnel ==
Personnel adapted from The Greater Pretenders liner notes.

Mini Mansions

- Zach Dawes
- Tyler Parkford
- Michael Shuman

Additional musicians

- Brian Wilson – additional vocals (track 5)
- Alex Turner – additional vocals (track 6)

Production

- Mini Mansions – production
- T Bone Burnett – executive producer
- Woody Jackson – co-production
- Michael Harris – production, engineering
- Sean O'Brien – engineering (tracks 1, 3, 6, and 9)
- Wesley Seidman – engineering (track 5)
- Gavin Lurssen – mastering
- John Congleton – mixing
- Cian Riordan – mixing (track 10)

Artwork

- Clay Russell Lerner – design
- Kendrick Brinson – back cover photography
- Neil Krug – insert photography
- NASA – cover photography
