= Mini Mansions (album) =

Studio album by Mini Mansions
- Released: November 2, 2010
- Studio: Pink Duck (Burbank, California)
- Genre: Indie pop
- Length: 39:52
- Label: Rekords Rekords
- Producer: Mini Mansions

Mini Mansions chronology
Mini Mansions (2010)	The Great Pretenders (2015)

Professional ratings
Aggregate scores
Source	Rating
Metacritic	(70/100)
Review scores
Source	Rating
Consequence of Sound	(B)

Mini Mansions is the debut album by Los Angeles band Mini Mansions. It was released on November 2, 2010.

== Track listing ==
All tracks written by Mini Mansions.

1. "Vignette #1" (1:27)
2. "The Room Outside" (4:20)
3. "Crime of the Season" (4:44)
4. "Monk" (4:03)
5. "Wunderbars" (3:03)
6. "Seven Sons" (3:06)
7. "Vignette #2" (2:16)
8. "Kiddie Hypnogogia" (2:56)
9. "Majik Marker" (4:04)
10. "Girls" (3:24)
11. "Vignette #3" (2:00)
12. "Thriller Escapade" (4:29)

== Personnel ==
Personnel adapted from album liner notes.

Mini Mansions

- Tyler Parkford
- Zach Dawes
- Michael Shuman

Production

- Mini Mansions – production
- Justin Smith – recording, mixing (tracks 1, 2, 6, 7, 9, and 11)
- Josh Homme – mixing (tracks 3–5)
- Biff Dawes – mixing (tracks 8, 10, and 12)
- Rueben Cohen – mastering
- Tyler Parkford – artwork
