= Tranquility Base Hotel & Casino (song) =

2018 single by Arctic Monkeys

Single by Arctic Monkeys

from the album Tranquility Base Hotel & Casino
- B-side: "Anyways"
- Released: 23 July 2018
- Length: 3:31
- Label: Domino
- Songwriter: Alex Turner
- Producers: James Ford; Alex Turner

Arctic Monkeys singles chronology
"Four Out of Five" (2018)	"Tranquility Base Hotel & Casino" (2018)	"There'd Better Be a Mirrorball" (2022)

Music video
- "Tranquility Base Hotel & Casino" on YouTube

"Tranquility Base Hotel & Casino" is a song by English indie rock band Arctic Monkeys. It was released on 23 July 2018 as the second single from their sixth studio album of the same name, along with an accompanying music video. On 16 October 2018, it was announced that a 7-inch vinyl version of the single would be released on 30 November 2018, alongside the previously unreleased B-side "Anyways".

== Music video ==
The music video was released on 23 July 2018 through the band's official YouTube Vevo account. It was directed by Ben Chappell and Aaron Brown who also directed the previous video for "Four Out of Five", and continues the Stanley Kubrick inspired visuals of the previous clip. The video centres around Turner living in the titular hotel and casino, travelling around the floors and lounging in the leisure facilities. He also plays the role of "Mark", the hotel's resident concierge, answering the telephone and redirecting the calls. The video was shot at the Peppermill Reno in Reno, Nevada. The moped which appears in the video is a Honda Elite 80.

== Track listing ==
All tracks are written by Alex Turner.

7-inch single / digital download
No.	Title	Length
1.	"Tranquility Base Hotel & Casino"	3:31
2.	"Anyways"	3:41

== Personnel ==
Credits adapted from liner notes.

"Tranquility Base Hotel & Casino"

- Alex Turner – vocals, backing vocals, piano, bass, organ, Orchestron, harpsichord
- Jamie Cook – guitar
- James Ford – drums, Orchestron, harpsichord, synthesisers, synthesiser programming

"Anyways"

- Alex Turner – all instruments

On the liner notes for "Anyways", the instrumental output is credited to "The Martini Police", a reference to the make-believe band from "Star Treatment".

Artwork

- Zackery Michael – photography
- Matthew Cooper – design

== Charts ==
Chart (2018)	Peak position
Belgium (Ultratip Bubbling Under Flanders)	7
Belgium (Ultratip Bubbling Under Wallonia)	36
Ireland (IRMA)	49
Poland (ZPAV)	28
Scotland Singles (Official Charts)	28
UK Audio Streaming (Official Charts Company)	31
UK Indie (Official Charts)	5
UK Singles Sales Chart (Official Charts Company)	20
UK Vinyl Chart (Official Charts Company)	1
US Hot Rock & Alternative Songs (Billboard)	29

== Certifications ==
Region	Certification	Certified units/sales
United Kingdom (BPI)	Silver	200,000^{‡}
^{‡} Sales+streaming figures based on certification alone.

== Release history ==
Region	Date	Format	Label	Catalogue no.
Various	23 July 2018	Contemporary hit radio	Domino	RUG970CDP
Various	30 November 2018	7-inch single	Domino	RUG970
Various	30 November 2018	Digital download	Domino	

== See also ==
- Tranquility Base, namesake, the lunar landing site of the 1969 Apollo 11 mission
