= Diploid Love =

Studio album by Brody Dalle
- Released: 28 April 2014
- Genre: Punk rock; alternative rock; electropunk
- Length: 41:39
- Label: Caroline, Queen of Hearts
- Producer: Alain Johannes; Brody Dalle

Singles from Diploid Love
- 1. "Meet the Foetus/Oh the Joy" Released: 9 February 2014; 2. "Parties for Prostitutes" Released: 6 March 2014; 3. "Don't Mess with Me" Released: 11 March 2014

Diploid Love is the debut solo album Brody Dalle, frontwoman of the Distillers. The digital download was released on 28 April 2014 in the United States and 29 April in Canada, followed by the CD and vinyl record set on 19 May. The lead single, "Meet the Foetus/Oh the Joy", was streamed for free on SoundCloud on 9 February before being released to iTunes on 17 February.

The album features collaborations from Garbage's Shirley Manson, The Strokes' Nick Valensi, Michael Shuman of Queens of the Stone Age and Emily Kokal of Warpaint.

== Reception ==
Diploid Love has received mostly positive reviews, with NME rating it 7 out of 10 while Rolling Stone rated it four out five stars.

The album debuted at number 33 on the UK Albums Chart and number 7 on the US Top Heatseekers albums chart. It also debuted and peaked at number 89 on the Australian Albums Chart.

== Track listing ==
All tracks are written by Brody Dalle.

Diploid Love track listing
No.	Title	Length
1.	"Rat Race"	3:38
2.	"Underworld"	5:19
3.	"Don't Mess with Me"	3:39
4.	"Dressed in Dreams"	4:47
5.	"Carry On"	4:21
6.	"Meet the Foetus/Oh the Joy" (featuring Shirley Manson and Emily Kokal)	5:03
7.	"I Don't Need Your Love"	6:01
8.	"Blood in Gutters"	4:18
9.	"Parties for Prostitutes"	4:33

== Personnel ==
- Brody Dalle – lead vocals, guitars, bass, drums, fun machine, synths, bass synth
- Alain Johannes – guitars, bass, piano, trumpet, mellotron, slide guitars
- Nick Valensi – guitar
- Michael Shuman – bass
- Darren Weiss – drums
- Bral – drums
- Hayden Scott – drums
- Cindy of El Mariachi Divas – horns
- Mariachi El Bronx – horns
- Jessy Greene – violins
- Tyler Parkford – piano
- Shirley Manson – backing vocals on "Meet the Foetus/Oh the Joy"
- Emily Kokal – backing vocals on "Meet the Foetus/Oh the Joy"

== Charts ==
Chart performance for Diploid Love
Chart (2014)	Peak position
Australian Albums (ARIA)	89
Austrian Albums (Ö3 Austria)	55
Belgian Albums (Ultratop Flanders)	167
German Albums (Offizielle Top 100)	45
UK Albums (OCC)	33
US Heatseekers Albums (Billboard)	7
