= Four Out of Five =

2018 single by Arctic Monkeys

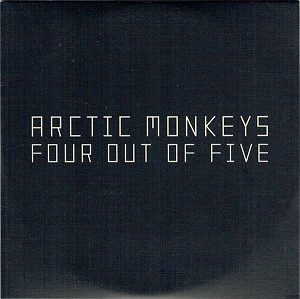
- Promotional CD single cover art

Single by Arctic Monkeys

from the album Tranquility Base Hotel & Casino
- Released: 13 May 2018
- Recorded: 2017–2018
- Genre: Glam rock
- Length: 5:12
- Label: Domino
- Songwriter: Alex Turner
- Producers: James Ford; Alex Turner

Arctic Monkeys singles chronology
"Snap Out of It" (2014)	"Four Out of Five" (2018)	"Tranquility Base Hotel & Casino" (2018)

Audio sample
- file; help

Music video
- "Four Out of Five" on YouTube

"Four Out of Five" is a song by English indie rock band Arctic Monkeys. It was released as the lead single from their sixth studio album, Tranquility Base Hotel & Casino (2018), on 13 May 2018, with an accompanying music video.

== Composition and lyrics ==
Musically "Four Out of Five" has been described as glam rock, being compared to the works of David Bowie. The song is one of few on the album to feature a traditional chorus, and has been likened to the band's Suck It and See as well as Everything You've Come to Expect by Turner's side-project The Last Shadow Puppets. The track has also been compared to stylistic subversions by King Crimson, Jim O'Rourke and Billy Joel, "stomping with an eerie, psychedelic whimsy that seems to come naturally".

The song's absurdist lyrics describe a taqueria on the roof of the album's titular hotel that has been ironically receiving "rave reviews, four stars out of five". In an interview with Zane Lowe for Beats 1, Alex Turner explained the track's ironic jokes are about critics who "never give a perfect 100". Thematically the song alludes to a variety of topics including war, natural disasters, space colonisation, and gentrification. The song's narrator has been described as "the self-aggrandizing narcissist anticipating a big reaction, now tasked with filling up the silence", with the "mocking and self-aware" Turner's vocals "sung in a grizzly, demonic croon that's vaguely unstable, like he's either about to break into tears or hysterical laughter".

== Music video ==
The music video was directed by Ben Chappell and Aaron Brown and was released on 13 May 2018 through the band's official YouTube account. The video features Alex Turner taking up the directorial chair and channeling several film influences, producing "video lifestyle packages" seemingly for the Tranquility Base Hotel & Casino. Among the packages being filmed, an alternative version of Turner without a beard is seen traversing tunnels, as well as the band playing at a country estate and assistants dressed in red overalls dressing the sets and taming a horse. Many of the scenes and shots were highly inspired by Stanley Kubrick movies. The video was filmed at Castle Howard in the band's native county of Yorkshire with the underground scenes being filmed at Munich Marienplatz station in Munich, Germany.

== Critical reception ==
Sam Sodomsky of Pitchfork praised the track, referring to it as "in a peculiar spot as both Tranquility Base Hotel & Casino's most immediate song and one of its oddest". He described the track as one of the album's highlights, in which its "risks build to something extraordinary". He noted that the track was "an escape, an invitation to forget everything you know about this wildly popular band and take them on their own terms", comparing it positively to less successful "rock reinventions" by Arcade Fire and Jack White, with the track instead displaying "a striking, recharged imagination". He concludes that the track "makes the future – as bleak as it may be – seem a lot more fun".

== Track listing ==
Promotional CD single (Domino RUG942CDP)
No.	Title	Length
1.	"Four Out of Five" (edit)	4:25
2.	"Four Out of Five" (album version)	5:12

== Personnel ==
Credits adapted from Tranquility Base Hotel & Casino liner notes.

- Alex Turner – vocals, backing vocals, piano, bass, organ, guitar, acoustic guitar
- Jamie Cook – guitar
- Tom Rowley – electric guitar / solo
- Matt Helders – drums
- Loren Humphrey – drums
- James Righton – Wurlitzer
- Josephine Stephenson – piano
- James Ford – percussion, synthesiser, Orchestron, acoustic guitar, rotary timpani

== Charts ==
=== Weekly charts ===
Chart (2018)	Peak position
Australia (ARIA)	80
Belgium (Ultratop 50 Flanders)	45
Belgium (Ultratip Bubbling Under Wallonia)	24
Canada Rock (Billboard)	38
Iceland (RÚV)	12
Ireland (IRMA)	30
Netherlands Single Tip (MegaCharts)	7
New Zealand Heatseekers (RMNZ)	2
Portugal (AFP)	12
Scottish Singles Sales (Official Charts)	91
Spain (PROMUSICAE)	87
UK Singles (Official Charts)	18
UK Singles Downloads (Official Charts)	83
UK Singles Sales Chart (Official Charts Company)	83
UK Indie (Official Charts)	2
US Hot Rock & Alternative Songs (Billboard)	12
US Rock & Alternative Airplay (Billboard)	20

=== Year-end charts ===
Chart (2018)	Position
US Adult Alternative Songs (Billboard)	49

== Certifications ==
Region	Certification	Certified units/sales
United Kingdom (BPI)	Silver	200,000^{‡}
^{‡} Sales+streaming figures based on certification alone.

== Release history ==
Region	Date	Format	Label	Catalogue no.
Various	13 May 2018	Contemporary hit radio	Domino	RUG942CDP
