= Michael Shuman =

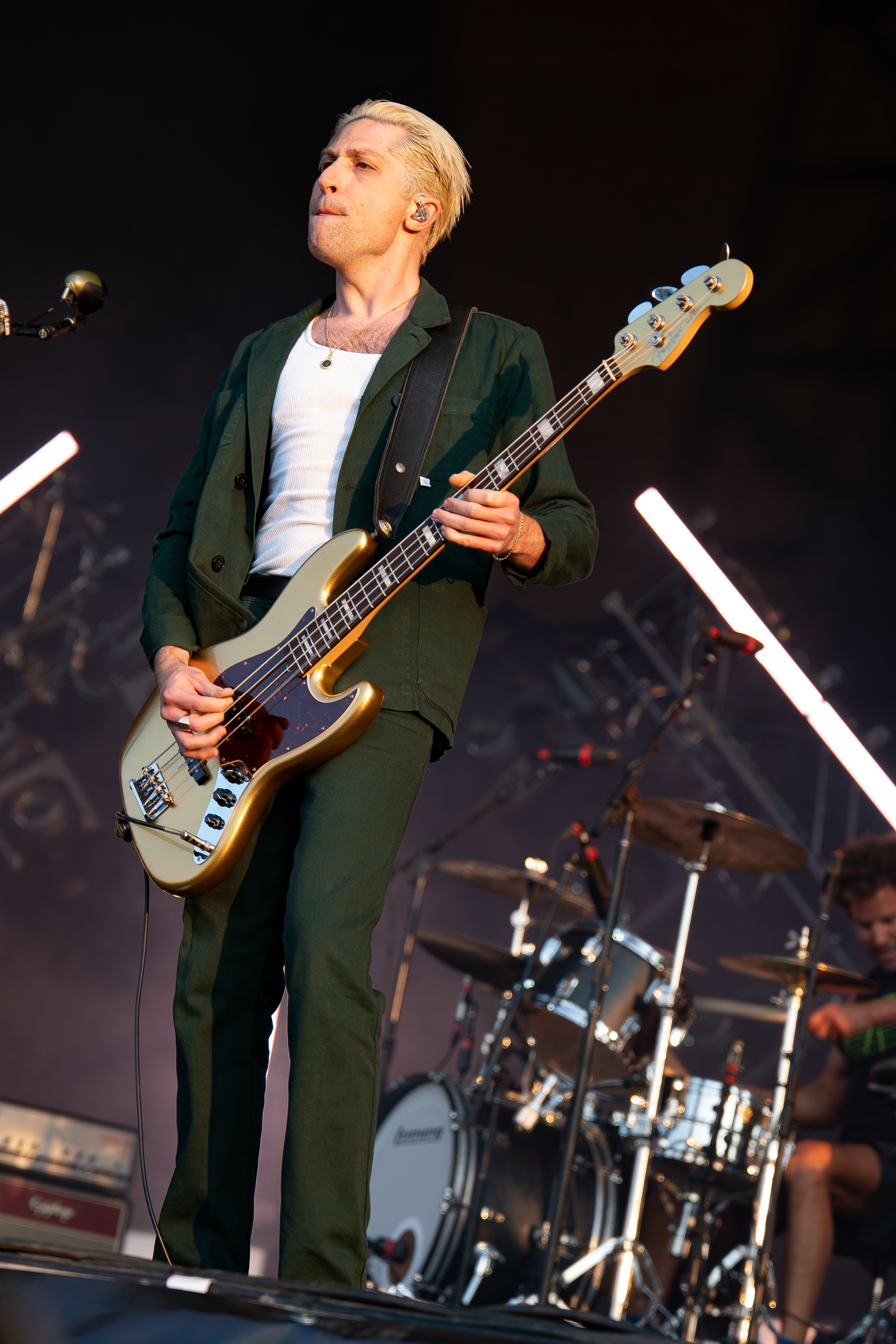
- Shuman performing with Queens of the Stone Age in 2023

Background information
- Also known as: Mikey Shoes
- Born: Michael Jay Shuman; August 20, 1985 (age 41)
- Origin: Los Angeles, California, U.S.
- Genres: Hard rock; indie rock; stoner rock; psychedelic rock; space rock; indie pop
- Occupations: Musician; songwriter
- Instruments: Vocals; bass; guitar; drums; percussion; keyboards
- Years active: 2002–present
- Labels: Buddyhead; Interscope

Michael Jay Shuman, also known as Mikey Shoes, (born August 20, 1985) is an American musician, songwriter and record producer. He is best known as the longest-serving bass guitarist of the rock band Queens of the Stone Age, with whom he has recorded four studio albums.

Shuman first joined Queens of the Stone Age in 2007 to tour in support of the band's fifth studio album, Era Vulgaris (2007). Remaining in the band ever since, he has since recorded four studio albums: ...Like Clockwork (2013), Villains (2017), In Times New Roman... (2023) and Perfecth (2026), with Shuman co-producing Perfecth with frontman Josh Homme.

Shuman also sings and plays various instruments in Mini Mansions and currently has a solo project under the moniker GLU. He has also co-fronted the bands Wires on Fire and Jubilee.

== Life and career ==
Shuman appeared in the Adam Sandler film The Wedding Singer as the Bar Mitzvah boy.

Shuman graduated from Loyola Marymount University in Los Angeles, California and attended Campbell Hall High School in North Hollywood, California, Portola Middle School in Tarzana, California, and Lanai Road Elementary School in Encino, California.

He co-founded, co-fronted, and played bass for Jubilee until late 2008, and is the bassist of Wires On Fire, both on Buddyhead Records. He joined Queens of the Stone Age in 2007 before the release of Era Vulgaris, replacing Alain Johannes, who chose to focus on other musical projects.

In 2013, Queens of the Stone Age released ...Like Clockwork, their first full album since Shuman joined the band. On the album, he provides vocals and plays bass, percussion, guitar, twelve-string guitar, and Mellotron. The album was the first Queens of the Stone Age album to reach number one on the Billboard 200. It also reached number two on the UK Albums Chart and was nominated for three Grammy Awards, including Best Rock Album.

Shuman contributed to the soundtrack of the video game Grand Theft Auto V in 2013. He also created the soundtrack for the 2017 drama film Feed.

In 2022, he announced a new solo project under the name GLU. He has since released three singles under GLU, "Cold Sweat", “Night Shift”, and "My Demons" featuring Sarah Barthel of the band Phantogram, as well as a five-song EP entitled My Demons.

His first full studio album under the GLU moniker, Pony Boy, was released on August 14, 2026.

== Personal life ==
From 2021 to 2023, Shuman was in a relationship with English actress Lily James.

== Discography ==
Appearances on albums

- 2004 – Wires on Fire – Homewrecker
- 2006 – Wires on Fire – Wires on Fire
- 2007 – Queens of the Stone Age – Era Vulgaris *
- 2009 – Hello=Fire – Hello=Fire
- 2009 – Mini Mansions – Mini Mansions EP
- 2011 – Mini Mansions – Mini Mansions
- 2013 – Queens of the Stone Age – ...Like Clockwork
- 2013 – Various Artists – The Music of Grand Theft Auto V
- 2014 – Brody Dalle – Diploid Love
- 2014 – Kimbra – The Golden Echo
- 2015 – Mini Mansions – The Great Pretenders
- 2016 – Xu Xu Fang – Daylong Secret
- 2017 – Queens of the Stone Age – Villains
- 2018 – Mini Mansions – Works Every Time EP
- 2019 – Mini Mansions – Guy Walks Into a Bar...
- 2023 – Queens of the Stone Age – In Times New Roman...
- 2026 – Queens of the Stone Age – Perfecth

Appearances on singles

- 2005 – Wires on Fire – "Mean Reds/Wires on Fire" (split single)
- 2007 – Queens of the Stone Age – "Sick, Sick, Sick" **
- 2007 – Queens of the Stone Age – "3's & 7's" **
- 2007 – Queens of the Stone Age – "Make It Wit Chu" **
- 2008 – Jubilee – "Rebel Hiss"
- 2008 – Jubilee – "In With the Out Crowd"
- 2009 – Hello=Fire – "Nature of Our Minds"
- 2009 – Mini Mansions – "Heart of Glass"
- 2010 – Mini Mansions – "Kiddie Hypnogogia"
- 2010 – Mini Mansions – "Wünderbars"
- 2013 – Queens of the Stone Age – "My God Is the Sun"
- 2013 – Queens of the Stone Age – "I Sat by the Ocean"
- 2014 – Queens of the Stone Age – "Smooth Sailing"
- 2014 – Mini Mansions – "Death Is A Girl"
- 2015 – Mini Mansions – "Any Emotions"
- 2015 – Mini Mansions – "Freakout!"
- 2015 – Mini Mansions – "Vertigo"
- 2018 – Mini Mansions – "Works Every Time"
- 2018 – Mini Mansions – "Midnight in Tokyo"
- 2019 – Mini Mansions – "GummyBear"
- 2019 – Mini Mansions – "Hey Lover"
- 2019 – Mini Mansions – "Bad Things (That Make You Feel Good)"
- 2019 – Mini Mansions – "I'm in Love"

"*" = Marks appearances on bonus tracks and "**" marks appearances on B-sides.
