= The Dream Synopsis =

EP by the Last Shadow Puppets
- Released: 2 December 2016
- Recorded: August 2016
- Studios: Future-Past, Hudson, NY
- Genres: Baroque pop; post-punk revival
- Length: 24:06
- Label: Domino

The Last Shadow Puppets chronology
Everything You've Come to Expect (2016)	The Dream Synopsis (2016)

Singles from The Dream Synopsis
- 1. "Is This What You Wanted" Released: 17 October 2016; 2. "Les Cactus" Released: 14 November 2016

The Dream Synopsis is an extended play by English supergroup the Last Shadow Puppets, released on 2 December 2016 by Domino Recording Company. It was produced by Patrick Higgins in Hudson, New York and contains re-recordings of two songs from the band's second album, Everything You've Come to Expect, as well as four cover versions that the band played during their 2016 tour. The album artwork features a still picture of the band recording the music video for their cover of "Is This What You Wanted". It was the final release of the band's second period of activity.

== Background and recording ==
The Dream Synopsis EP was recorded in one day at Future-Past Studios in August 2016. The songs featured on the release were recorded live in the studio. The album was described as featuring an array of genres including baroque pop, rockabilly, post-punk and brit rock.

== Release and promotion ==
On 17 October 2016, the band announced the EP was going to be released on 2 December of that same year, digitally, on CD, and on a limited edition red vinyl.

=== Singles and Music videos ===
The lead single, a cover of Leonard Cohen's "Is This What You Wanted" was released on 17 October with an accompanying music video directed by Ben Chappell and Aaron Brown. It features the band performing the track live on a sound stage.

On 14 November they released a music video, directed by Ben Chapell, for their rendition of Jacques Dutronc's "Les Cactus". Once again the band appears performing the song live at a music studio.

Their next video, a cover Glaxo Babies's "This Is Your Life", was released on 5 December and followed the formula of the previous ones, with the band performing the song live on a catwalk.

== Reception ==
Professional ratings
Review scores
Source	Rating
AllMusic	4/5 stars
The Skinny	4/5 stars
Under the Radar	7.5/10

For The Skinny, Aidan Ryan wrote, "these six songs hang together with a real emotional coherence. Turner is in top form, Kane's vocals have never sounded more outrageously appropriate, and The Last Shadow Puppets do what they do best: ham it up so much – and so well – that you might just might believe that they're deadly serious". Matt Collar of AllMusic said, "the covers here are so confidently performed and arranged that they sound close to definitive," and thought the EP complemented Everything You've Come to Expect, functioning "as a swaggering coda to that recording, a kind of final summation of the full-length album's arty, hedonistic theatricality". Under the Radar's review was also positive, noting that although the album was mostly covers the band did not "bypass their sense of adventure and pop experimentation" and described the body of work as "tight and snappy".

== Track listing ==
No.	Title	Writer(s)	Length
1.	"Aviation"	Alex Turner; Miles Kane	3:46
2.	"Les Cactus"	Jacques Dutronc; Jacques Lanzmann	3:20
3.	"Totally Wired"	Mark E. Smith; Marc Riley; Paul Hanley; Craig Scanlon	3:37
4.	"This Is Your Life"	Rob Chapman	2:55
5.	"Is This What You Wanted"	Leonard Cohen	6:46
6.	"The Dream Synopsis"	Alex Turner	3:42
Total length:			24:06

== Personnel ==
The Last Shadow Puppets

- Alex Turner
- Miles Kane
- James Ford
- Zachary Dawes

Additional musicians

- Tyler Parkford – keyboards, backing vocals
- Loren Humphrey – drums, percussion
- Scott Gillies – guitar
- Jordan Pettay – saxophone

Production

- Patrick Higgins – recording
- James Ford – mixing
- Matt Colton – mastering

Orchestrations

- Owen Pallett – arrangement
- Caroline Buckman – violin
- Claudia Chopek – violin
- Jennifer Takamatsu – violin
- Mikala Schmitz – cello

Artwork

- Matthew Cooper – design

== Charts ==
Chart (2016)	Peak position
Scottish Albums (Official Charts)	55
UK Albums (Official Charts)	57
