= Grammy Award for Best Alternative Music Performance =

Award presented by the Recording Academy

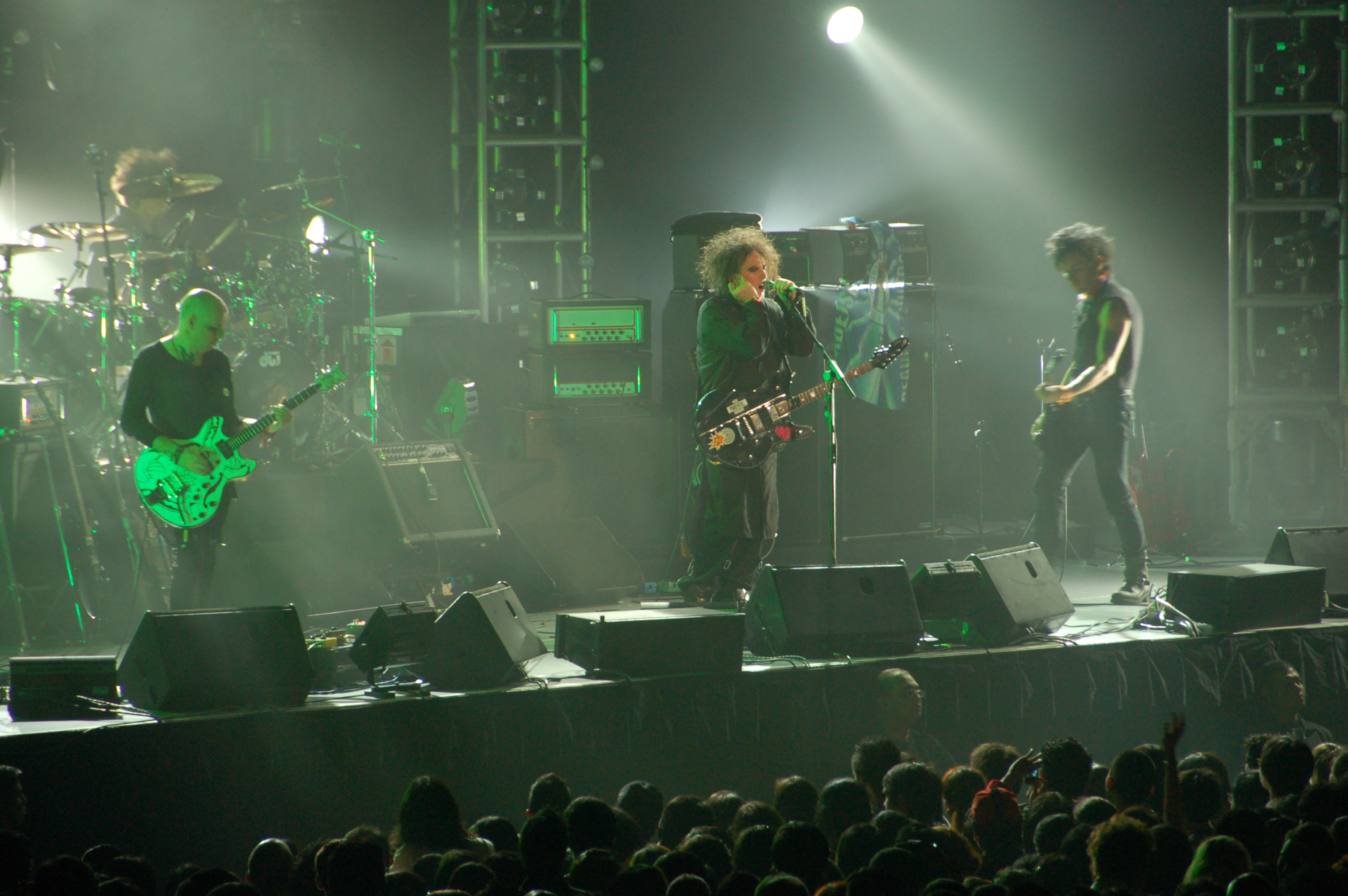
- "Alone" by The Cure is the most recent recipient
- Awarded for: Quality vocal or instrumental alternative recordings (tracks or singles only)
- Presented by: National Academy of Recording Arts and Sciences
- First award: 2023
- Currently held by: The Cure — "Alone" (2026)
- Website: grammy.com

The Grammy Award for Best Alternative Music Performance is an award presented by the Recording Academy to honor quality alternative music performances in any given year. The award was presented for the first time on February 5, 2023, at the 65th Annual Grammy Awards. It is a companion category to the Grammy Award for Best Alternative Music Album and the first new category in the alternative genre since the field's creation in 1991. The category sits in the Rock, Metal, & Alternative field.

The Academy stated that the award goes to "a track or single performance that recognizes the best recordings in an alternative performance by a solo artist, collaborating artists, established duo, or established group."

== Background ==
In 1991, and from 1994 to 1999, the award for Best Alternative Music Album was known as Best Alternative Music Performance. In this time, it was won by Sinéad O'Connor, U2, Green Day, Nirvana, Beck, Radiohead and Beastie Boys.

The category was one of five new categories announced in June 2022 alongside Best Americana Performance, Best Score Soundtrack for Video Games and Other Interactive Media, Best Spoken Word Poetry Album and Songwriter of the Year, Non-Classical.

== Winners and nominees ==
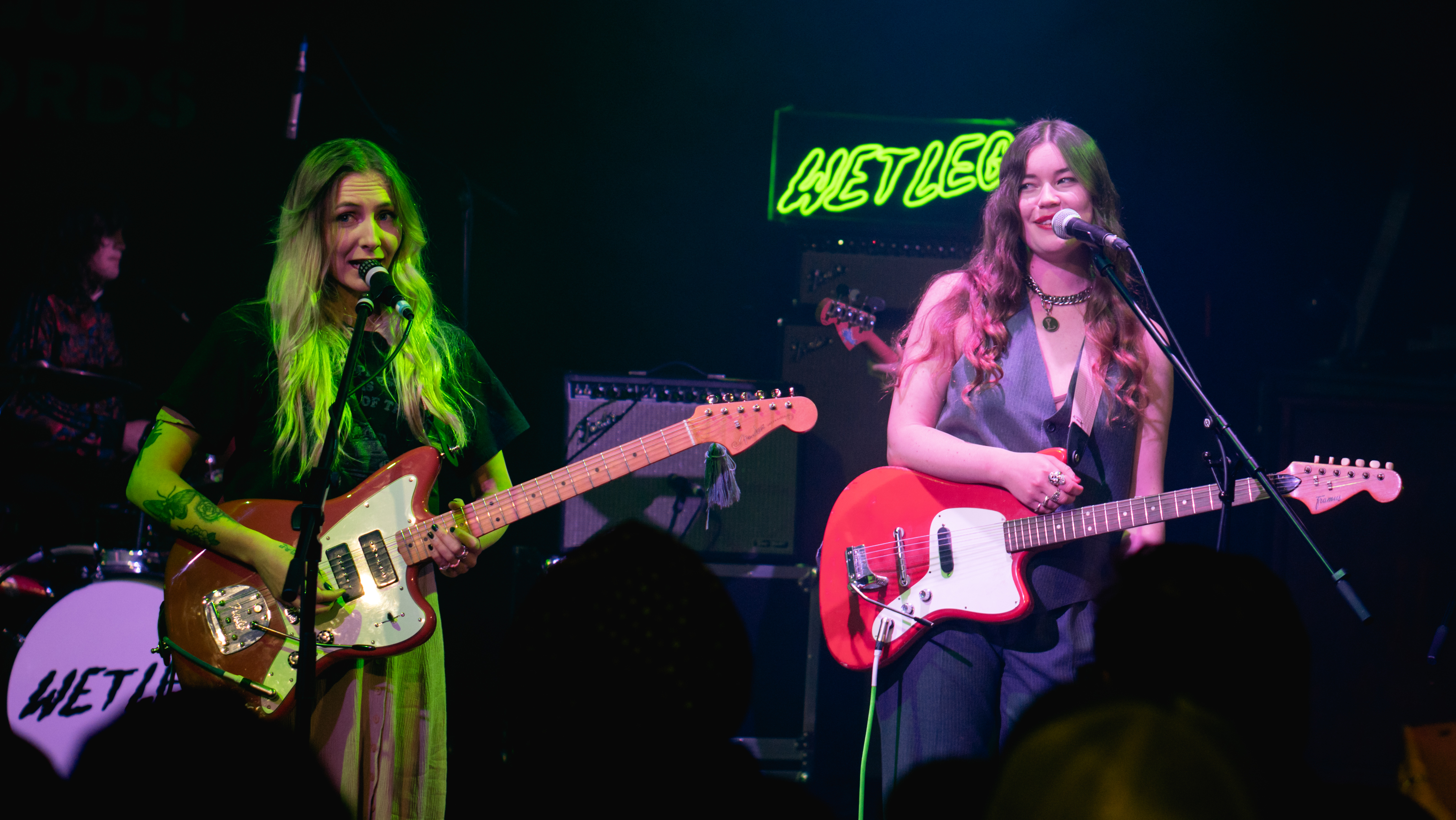
Inaugural winners Wet Leg

Year	Artist	Work
2023
2023	Wet Leg	"Chaise Longue"
2023	Arctic Monkeys	"There'd Better Be a Mirrorball"
2023	Big Thief	"Certainty"
2023	Florence and the Machine	"King"
2023	Yeah Yeah Yeahs featuring Perfume Genius	"Spitting Off the Edge of the World"
2024
2024	Paramore	"This Is Why"
2024	Alvvays	"Belinda Says"
2024	Arctic Monkeys	"Body Paint"
2024	Boygenius	"Cool About It"
2024	Lana Del Rey	"A&W"
2025
2025	St. Vincent	"Flea"
2025	Cage the Elephant	"Neon Pill"
2025	Nick Cave and the Bad Seeds	"Song of the Lake"
2025	Fontaines D.C.	"Starburster"
2025	Kim Gordon	"Bye Bye"
2026
2026	The Cure	"Alone"
2026	Bon Iver	"Everything Is Peaceful Love"
2026	Turnstile	"Seein' Stars"
2026	Wet Leg	"Mangetout"
2026	Hayley Williams	"Parachute"
2027
2027	Angine de Poitrine	"Fabienk"
2027	Phoebe Bridgers	"Kill Me"
2027	Geese	"Au Pays du Cocaine"
2027	Rosalía	"Reliquia"
2027	Hayley Williams	"Showbiz"

^{^[I]} Each year is linked to the article about the Grammy Awards held that year.

== Artists with multiple nominations ==
3 nominations

- Hayley Williams (including one with Paramore)

2 nominations

- Arctic Monkeys
- Phoebe Bridgers (including one with Boygenius)
- Wet Leg
