= Zach Dawes =

American musician (born 1985)

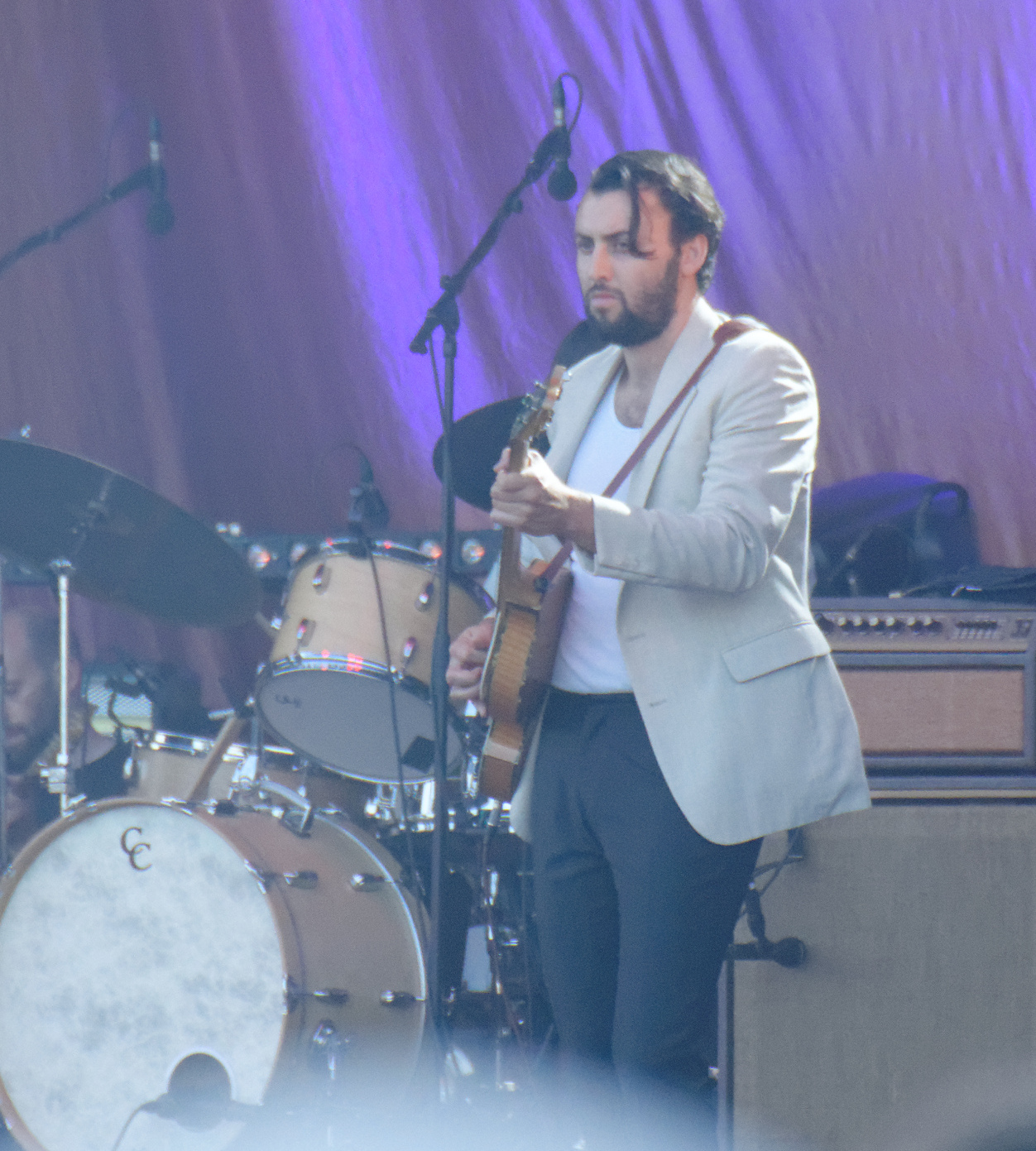
- Dawes in 2016

Background information
- Born: Zachary Edwin Dawes; July 2, 1985 (age 41); Los Angeles, California, U.S.
- Genres: Indie rock; psychedelic pop; rock
- Occupations: Musician; songwriter; audio engineer; producer
- Instruments: Bass guitar; guitar; keyboards; drums
- Spouse: Molly Grassini (m. 2022)

Zachary Edwin Dawes (born July 2, 1985) is an American musician, producer, engineer, and technician, best known as the bassist for the bands Mini Mansions and The Last Shadow Puppets. He has also worked extensively with Brian Wilson, Lana Del Rey, Sharon Van Etten, among other musicians and songwriters. He composes and music supervises for many film and television shows, including The Summer I Turned Pretty, The Big Door Prize, and worked with frequent collaborator Este Haim on the hit Netflix show Nobody Wants This. His producing work with Lana Del Rey on Norman Fucking Rockwell! and Did You Know That There's a Tunnel Under Ocean Blvd earned him two Grammy nominations for Album of the Year.

== Early life ==
Dawes grew up in Encino, California. He majored in Film & Digital Media at the University of California, Santa Cruz.

As a child, Dawes learned to play the piano, but switched to bass when he discovered that the band he was starting needed a bass player.

== Career ==
Dawes spent many years assisting, engineering, and playing bass for American record producer T Bone Burnett. He played bass on albums and soundtracks for which Burnett was producer, composer or contributing artist, including The Hunger Games: Songs from District 12 and Beyond, Inside Llewyn Davis (soundtrack), A Place at the Table, True Detective, season 1 of Nashville (2012 TV series), Lisa Marie Presley's album Storm & Grace, the album Put Your Needle Down by the band The Secret Sisters, and Lost on the River: The New Basement Tapes, a reworking of unfinished songs by Bob Dylan.

He has toured extensively with his band Mini Mansions, Sparks, The Last Shadow Puppets, and Courtney Barnett.

Most recently he was a producer on Lana Del Rey's Take Me Home Country Roads (2023), Oh Henry (2025), and Bluebird (2025).

He has co-written and produced several songs with Sharon Van Etten for film and television projects.

Dawes composed the music for all three seasons of Amazon's hit series The Summer I Turned Pretty. The Apple Original Stick starring Owen Wilson (2025), the first season of Netflix's Nobody Wants This (2024), Netflix's historical drama A Small Light (2023), Apple's The Big Door Prize seasons 1 and 2 (2023), Grease Rise of the Pink Ladies (2023), Abbi Jacobson's A League of Their Own (2022), Angelyne (2022), HBO's Generation (2021) and many more.

In 2021, Dawes composed the music for the Netflix film There's Someone Inside Your House.

In 2019, Dawes was the music supervisor and contributed to the soundtrack for the South by Southwest award-winning film, Peanut Butter Falcon.

== Personal life ==
Dawes married partner Molly Grassini on September 25, 2022. The wedding was attended by members of Arctic Monkeys, Warpaint, and Dawes' band Mini Mansions, among others.

== Discography ==
Appearances on albums, television shows, and films:

- 2009 - Mini Mansions – Mini Mansions EP
- 2011 - Mini Mansions – Mini Mansions
- 2012 - Nashville – The Music of Nashville: Season 1, Vol 1.
- 2012 - Lisa Marie Presley – Storm & Grace
- 2013 - Nashville – The Music of Nashville: Season 1, Vol. 2.
- 2013 - A Place at the Table – "Original Motion Picture Soundtrack"
- 2013 - Various Artists – The Music of Grand Theft Auto V
- 2014 - The Secret Sisters – Put Your Needle Down
- 2014 - Kimbra – The Golden Echo
- 2014 - The New Basement Tapes – Lost on the River: The New Basement Tapes
- 2015 - Brian Wilson – No Pier Pressure
- 2015 - Mini Mansions – The Great Pretenders
- 2016 - The Last Shadow Puppets – Everything You've Come to Expect
- 2016 - Unloved – Guilty of Love
- 2016 - Mini Mansions – Flashbacks: A Collection of B-Sides From the Great Pretenders
- 2016 - The Last Shadow Puppets – The Dream Synopsis
- 2017 - Alexandra Savior – Belladonna of Sadness
- 2017 - Imelda May – Life Love Flesh Blood
- 2018 - Kimbra – Primal Heart
- 2018 - Arctic Monkeys – Tranquility Base Hotel & Casino
- 2018 - Miles Kane – Coup de Grace
- 2018 - Mini Mansions – Works Every Time EP
- 2019 - Sharon Van Etten – Remind Me Tomorrow
- 2019 - The Peanut Butter Falcon (Original Motion Picture Soundtrack)
- 2019 - Mini Mansions – Guy Walks Into A Bar...
- 2019 - Lana Del Rey – Norman Fucking Rockwell
- 2021 - Lana Del Rey – Blue Banisters
- 2021 - There's Someone Inside Your House (Netflix)
- 2021 - Generation (HBO)
- 2022 - Sharon Van Etten – We've Been Going About This All Wrong
- 2022 - Angelyne (Peacock)
- 2022 - Abbi Jacobson's A League of Their Own (Amazon)
- 2023 - Lana Del Rey – Did You Know That There's a Tunnel Under Ocean Blvd
- 2023 - Sir Chloe - I Am the Dog
- 2023 - The Big Door Prize (Apple) Seasons 1 and 2
- 2023 - Grease Rise of the Pink Ladies (Paramount+)
- 2023 - A Small Light (Netflix)
- 2024 - Nobody Wants This (Netflix)
- 2025 - Stick starring Owen Wilson (Apple)
