= Tranquility Base Hotel & Casino =

2018 studio album by Arctic Monkeys

Studio album by Arctic Monkeys
- Released: 11 May 2018
- Recorded: 2016–2018
- Studios: Lunar Surface, Los Angeles; Vox, Los Angeles; Unknown studios in London; La Frette, Paris
- Genres: Art rock; psychedelic pop; lounge pop; progressive rock; space pop; glam rock
- Length: 40:51
- Label: Domino
- Producers: James Ford; Alex Turner

Arctic Monkeys chronology
AM (2013)	Tranquility Base Hotel & Casino (2018)	Live at the Royal Albert Hall (2020)

Singles from Tranquility Base Hotel & Casino
- 1. "Four Out of Five" Released: 13 May 2018; 2. "Tranquility Base Hotel & Casino" Released: 23 July 2018

Tranquility Base Hotel & Casino (stylised as Tranquility Base Hotel + Casino) is the sixth studio album by the English rock band Arctic Monkeys, released on 11 May 2018 through Domino Recording Company. The album was written by frontman Alex Turner in 2017 on a Steinway Vertegrand piano in his Los Angeles home. It was produced in Los Angeles, Paris and London by frequent Arctic Monkeys collaborator James Ford and Turner, alongside a wide array of guest musicians including Tom Rowley, Loren Humphrey, James Righton, Zach Dawes, Tyler Parkford and Cam Avery. Turner designed the album artwork himself, which depicts the eponymous resort with cardboard cut-outs and a tape recorder. Its title refers to Tranquility Base, the site of the 1969 Apollo 11 Moon landing.

Tranquility Base Hotel & Casino is a major departure from the band's previous guitar-heavy work, being considered less accessible than its internationally successful predecessor, AM (2013). It features a rich sound that embodies psychedelic pop, lounge pop, space pop, and glam rock, as well as elements of jazz. It also draws influence from soul, progressive rock, funk, French pop and film soundtracks of the 1960s. Instrumentally, it incorporates vintage synthesisers and keyboards, including organs, pianos, harpsichords and the dolceola, as well as the Orchestron, Farfisa and RMI Rocksichord. Baritone and lap steel guitars are introduced by the band on multiple tracks, in addition to the electric and acoustic guitars typically used by the band, as well as a variety of percussion instruments, including rotary timpani and vibraphones. Its lyrical content draws heavily from science fiction and film, touching on consumerism, politics, religion and technology. These topics are explored through the concept of a luxury resort on the Moon told from the perspective of various characters, such as the singer in the in-house band on "Star Treatment" or the hotel's receptionist called 'Mark', whose name is directly referred to in "Tranquility Base Hotel & Casino" (the title track) and many other times throughout the albums lyrics and visuals.

Despite its stylistic deviation polarising listeners, Tranquility Base Hotel & Casino was released to generally positive reviews and was named the best album of 2018 by Q magazine. Nominated for the 2018 Mercury Prize, it received two nominations at the 2019 Grammy Awards: Best Alternative Music Album and Best Rock Performance for the single "Four Out of Five". It became the band's sixth consecutive number-one debut in the UK, the country's fastest-selling vinyl record in 25 years, and the band's third top 10 album in the US. It also topped the charts in Australia, Belgium, the Netherlands, France, Greece, Portugal, Scotland and Switzerland. Following its release, the album was promoted by the singles "Four Out of Five" and "Tranquility Base Hotel & Casino", as well as a global tour and multiple television appearances.

== Background and recording ==
The band's fifth studio album AM was released in September 2013 to critical acclaim, bringing the group new levels of commercial success globally. In April 2016, Alex Turner's psychedelic pop side project the Last Shadow Puppets released their second studio album Everything You've Come to Expect. A year later, Turner co-produced Alexandra Savior's debut album Belladonna of Sadness with James Ford. This was Turner's first foray into record production, with the two proceeding to produce Tranquility Base Hotel & Casino.

Following the international success of AM, Turner suffered from writer's block, and struggled to find a direction for a new album. Having written "Sweet Dreams, TN" from Everything You've Come to Expect, he lost interest in writing love songs, with a friend suggesting "not doing that for a moment". In early 2016, upon watching Federico Fellini's 1963 film 8½, Turner was inspired by its depiction of writer's block, childhood memories and the science fiction genre. He began writing songs for the album on a Steinway Vertegrand piano he received as a 30th birthday gift from the Arctic Monkeys' manager Ian McAndrew. He wrote and recorded the demos in a spare room of his Los Angeles home dubbed "Lunar Surface". During the process Turner recalled piano lessons he had received from his father at the age of eight, commenting that he "never thought [his father's influence] would find its way into [his] compositions as much as it has on this record". Many of the vocal takes included on the finished album originate from Turner's home demos on a TASCAM 388 8-track recording machine. Guitarist Jamie Cook commented that he "was blown away by the direction Alex had gone in" when Turner played him the demos in February 2017. Initially unsure how they would record the songs, the two discussed Turner releasing a solo album, but ultimately decided against the idea. Cook began recording guitar ideas to complement the demos, with bassist Nick O'Malley approving of the demo for "Star Treatment".

In September 2017, the Arctic Monkeys began recording material at Vox Studios in Hollywood and La Frette in Paris. Frequent collaborator James Ford co-produced the album with Turner. During these sessions the piano and guitar parts began to mesh, with O'Malley and drummer Matt Helders joining. Helders commented that during recording he played with more restraint than on previous records, noting that "it's about playing for the songs". Further recording sessions took place with Ford in London. The group employed a wide array of guest musicians. Ford and guitarist Tom Rowley, (who has served as a touring member of the band since 2013), contributed to several tracks. Drummer Loren Humphrey of Guards, keyboardist James Righton and pianist Josephine Stephenson contributed to "Four Out of Five", "Science Fiction" and "The Ultracheese". Zach Dawes and Tyler Parkford of Mini Mansions, and Evan Weiss of Wires on Fire also performed on "American Sports" and "The World's First Ever Monster Truck Front Flip". Additionally, Cam Avery of Tame Impala contributed backing vocals to "She Looks Like Fun". The musicians performed together in a single room, influenced by images of the sessions for the Beach Boys' Pet Sounds (1966), as well as Phil Spector's Wall of Sound production method. Parkford joined the band as a touring member following the album's release, whilst Avery also joined the Tranquility Base Hotel & Casino Tour as an opening act and guest musician at some shows.

== Composition ==
=== Musical style and influences ===
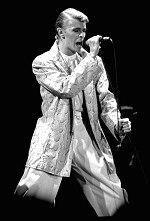
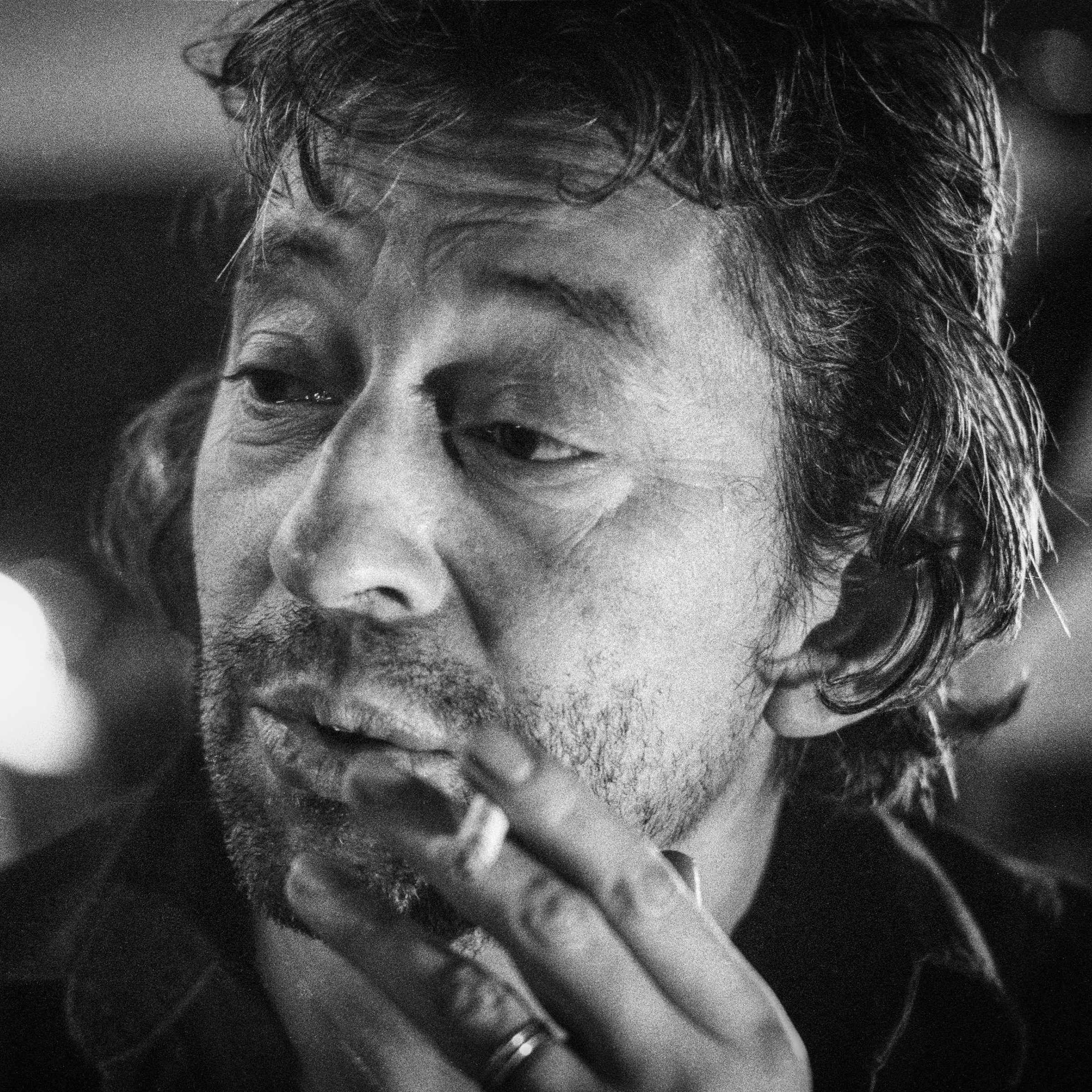
Several music critics cited David Bowie (left) and Serge Gainsbourg (right) as having influenced the album's style.

Tranquility Base Hotel & Casino is a departure from AM's guitar riff-driven work, resultant of Turner's usage of the piano over the guitar in its composition. It has been characterised as psychedelic pop, lounge pop, space pop, and glam rock. The album further incorporates influences from jazz, as well as soul, prog, funk, French pop and film soundtracks of the 1960s. Its sound has been described as "subdued, but warm and classic in the way that musicians who seek out storied mixing consoles aspire to", as well as "lush and claustrophobic". The melodic songs feature unconventional chord progressions, and often abandon the traditional "verse" and "chorus" structure. The album has been noted for its lack of distinct hooks, and its tendency to limit "casual consumption". Instrumentally, it incorporates vintage synthesisers and keyboards reminiscent of space age pop. Keyboards used on the album include organs, pianos, harpsichords and the dolceola, as well as the Orchestron, Farfisa and RMI Rocksichord. Multiple tracks feature baritone and lap steel guitars in addition to the electric and acoustic guitars typically used by the band, as well as a variety of percussion instruments, including rotary timpani and vibraphones.

The album has been compared to the works of David Bowie, Serge Gainsbourg, Leonard Cohen, Nick Cave, Jarvis Cocker, Richard Hawley and Father John Misty, as well as Pet Sounds (1966) by the Beach Boys. Turner has cited Gainsbourg's Histoire de Melody Nelson (1971), Cohen's Death of a Ladies' Man (1977), Dion's Born to Be with You (1975) and François de Roubaix's score for Le Samouraï (1967) as key influences. The album's drum and bass lines have been compared closely to those on Histoire de Melody Nelson, with the influence of Pet Sounds pervading the record, especially in its vocal harmonies.

=== Lyrics and themes ===
"Science fiction creates these other worlds within which we can explore our own, and I wanted to write something about that idea. So, through reading sci-fi ... I began to access that sort of vocabulary — then suddenly we're talking about virtual reality moon casino experiences."

— Alex Turner

Tranquility Base Hotel & Casino is a concept album depicting a luxury hotel at Tranquility Base, the location of the 1969 Moon landing. The record is said to be one of the bands' most complex yet surreal lyrical, visual, and conceptual pieces, as the album refers frequently to science fiction, incorporating "hyperrealist satire" and "interstellar escapism" in order to explore entertainment's role in periods of social change: "the desire to escape into it, and the desire to create it". This is influenced by current politics in the United States, as well as consumerism, fame, religion and technology. The "forgetful, distractible oddballs" Turner embodies as his narrators frequently become distracted. The multiple unreliable narrators are "sometimes barely [able to] string a sentence together", and draw influence from lounge music. Turner uses multiple vocal tones to "embody" the different characters, with his vocal range incorporating both deep and falsetto singing styles. Turner's lyrical voice has been described as "absurdist suave", as opposed to the "witty sleaze" of his previous work, and has been compared to Argentine short-story writer Jorge Luis Borges. The lyrics are dense and self-aware and have been described as "endlessly quotable", written in a "rambling, stream-of-consciousness style". Turner cited various films as influencing the lyrics, including Spirits of the Dead (1968), World on a Wire (1973) and the works of Jean-Pierre Melville. Furthermore, the ideas present within the books Amusing Ourselves to Death (1985) by Neil Postman and Infinite Jest (1996) by David Foster Wallace inspired Turner's philosophical exploration of the human condition in contemporary society.

Turner commented that he took a different approach to writing lyrics than on previous albums, noting that he "became less concerned on this album [with] compartmentalising every idea to the point where each song became this episode that starts and ends in three minutes". Canadian singer-songwriter Leonard Cohen inspired this different perspective on each lyric's relationship with its context. He further noted that his writing on the album was straightforward in a way he considered similar to the band's debut Whatever People Say I Am, That's What I'm Not (2006). On the connections between the two albums, Turner commented that "it's set in a completely different place, obviously, but there's something in the lyrics that reminds me of something in that writing. I'm tempted to say that it's something to do with how blunt it is. I think that was something I was trying to get away from, and perhaps I’ve returned to it now".

=== Songs ===
"Star Treatment", the album's opening track, begins with a reference to American indie rock band the Strokes' early influence on Turner. On their impact, Turner commented: "The arrival of the Strokes changed what music I was listening to, what shoes I was wearing. I grew my hair out and borrowed my mum's blazer. I was a huge fan". Its chorus describes a fictional band named "the Martini Police". The track's narrator expresses surprise that somebody has never seen the science fiction film Blade Runner (1982). Turner has stated that this was based on real-life interactions, noting his interest in the fact that "it goes beyond: 'What do you mean you've never seen Blade Runner?' and gets to: 'Oh my God, I envy you!'". Musically, the track's glam influences have been analogised to "David Bowie descending on a lunar wedding". It has also been compared to the soul of Curtis Mayfield, with Turner's "debonaire" vocal delivery being likened to rapping.

"One Point Perspective" is built around a "sweet" and "plucky" percussive piano motif containing "lavish" strings and a basic hip-hop beat. The song's "dandy" narrator has been compared to Pulp frontman Jarvis Cocker. Turner has alluded that the song was inspired by conversations he witnessed and experienced whilst under the influence of narcotics. Its title refers to a cinematic technique often employed by film directors such as Stanley Kubrick and Wes Anderson, which Turner described as "unsettling". Turner has noted that the track's jazz elements were influenced by his father, commenting that "the sort of jazzy bit of that, that every time it comes around, when I sit there, it feels like something he would play".

On "American Sports", the album explores a darker musical direction, featuring "spooky", heavily affected keyboards. Turner's vocals have been described as both "sinister" and "dreamy". The lyric "the trainer's explanation was accepted by the steward" was suggested by his grandfather, in reference to horse racing.The album's titular track mocks contemporary society's sterility, as well as containing political references, on which Turner has commented that "more of those ideas have certainly found a way into this record than anything I’ve done before". It is told from the perspective of the hotel's receptionist, named Mark. Musically, the track features "skittish" jazz drums, as well as harpsichords, performed by Turner and co-producer James Ford. "Golden Trunks" has been described as "unsettling", and contains a "raw and brooding" guitar riff that has been compared to the album's predecessor AM. Turner's falsetto vocals display "rakish charm", with the song depicting a conversation between Turner and a potential romantic interest. It has been suggested that the lyrics "the leader of the free world reminds you of a wrestler wearing tight golden trunks" is in reference to the then president of the United States Donald Trump.

"Four Out of Five"
The album's lead single is a glam rock song, which has been described as its most accessible track.

"Four Out of Five" has been described as a "Bowie-ish glam song", as well as being likened to a stylistic combination of the band's Suck It and See (2011) and Turner's work with the Last Shadow Puppets. Kitty Empire of The Observer compared the song's guitar riff to the band's single "Do I Wanna Know?" (2013), incorporating Lou Reed's "Satellite of Love" (1972). It has been labelled as the album's only "singalong anthem", and describes an acclaimed taqueria on the moon named the "Information-Action Ratio", in reference to Neil Postman's concept, exploring gentrification. The taqueria's name was a coincidental result of Matt Helders' backing vocals, with Turner commenting that "phonetically it's quite alluring". The articulation of Turner's vocals on the track incorporates elements of hip hop.

On "The World's First Ever Monster Truck Front Flip", Turner vocally alternates from a "Bowie-style drawl to the falsetto and to a gruff murmur", with its minimal percussion and bass guitar and use of reverb being compared to Pet Sounds. The track was inspired by a news report Turner read describing a monster truck front flip. "Science Fiction" is driven by a "slinky" riff, and has been compared stylistically to the band's Humbug (2009). The track's title is one of many references to science fiction on the album; however, Turner expressed that his reading of the genre was limited. "She Looks Like Fun" has been described as a "'60s-style novelty track". Lyrically, the song addresses social media; Turner was inspired by an episode of American comedy-drama television series High Maintenance in which with the need for "constant updating and refreshing" of social media is depicted. "Batphone" has also been compared to Humbug and AM, musically featuring a "heavier thump".

The album's "schmoozy" final track "The Ultracheese" has been compared to pop standards "Que Sera, Sera", "New York, New York", "Are You Lonesome Tonight?" and "Leavin' on Your Mind". It features a "gorgeous" acoustic and baritone guitar solos performed by Tom Rowley, and descending piano chords that "symbol a kind of final bow". Turner has commented that musically the song resembles his "default position", comparing it to previous tracks "Cornerstone" and "The Dream Synopsis". The track was recorded in a live take with a large ensemble, including baritone and pedal steel guitars, two drum kits, a bass guitar, a Wurlitzer, and two pianos. Turner referred to the song as the group's most successful implementation of this recording style.

== Artwork and title ==
The album's artwork was designed by Alex Turner using cardboard cut-outs and a Revox A77 tape machine, itself containing an early version of the album. On the artwork, Turner stated that "In the past I've definitely had record covers that don't, to me, represent what's on the wax, and I certainly don't feel that way about this one. By the end of it, I think I'd forgotten there even was a record. I'd just gotten obsessed with cardboard." Turner began by drawing a hexagon, to reflect the band's sixth studio album, eventually drawing influence from architects Eero Saarinen and John Lautner, becoming "quite consumed" by the process. The artwork was initially inspired by a photograph depicting the set for a Lunar Hilton hotel being built for 2001: A Space Odyssey (1968). Turner began imagining a model of the titular hotel within its lobby. He was further inspired by the rotating sign of Los Angeles food chain House of Pies, an element which he incorporated into the artwork.

The album's title is in reference to Tranquility Base, the first site on the Moon to be walked by humans. Turner was inspired by the conspiracy theory that Stanley Kubrick faked the first Moon landing, initially naming the spare room in which he wrote and recorded the project's demos "Lunar Surface". He stated that naming the room was "instrumental" in the conception of the title, alongside a series of Apollo-branded cups owned by Turner which depict an eagle with the caption "Tranquility Base".

== Release and promotion ==
In September 2017, bassist Nick O'Malley announced that the band had begun recording a follow-up to 2013's AM, stating that if a new album was not released in 2018 they would have had "problems". The release of Tranquility Base Hotel & Casino was first announced on 5 April 2018, through a short video directed by Ben Chappell. The video depicted the spinning model featured in the album's artwork, and included snippets of new music. The group announced promotional pop-up shops on the weekend of the album's release, in their native Sheffield, New York, Paris, Berlin, Tokyo, and Sydney. The Sydney pop-up venue also included a mini film festival curated by the band.

=== Singles and videos ===
No singles were released prior to the album, although multiple tracks were debuted before its release in the first leg of the Tranquility Base Hotel & Casino Tour. Two days after the album's release, "Four Out of Five" was issued as its lead single, alongside an accompanying music video directed by Ben Chappell and Aaron Brown. The video was compared to the works of Stanley Kubrick, depicting Turner walking through an elegant home reminiscent of The Shining and an underground train station evocative of the dystopia of A Clockwork Orange. The single debuted at number 18 on the UK Singles Chart.

In July, the group released a music video for the album's titular track, "Tranquility Base Hotel & Casino", again directed by Brown and Chappell. The stylised video is inspired by Kubrick, featuring the surreal science fiction style established in "Four Out of Five", and depicts Turner exploring a hotel. The track was announced as the album's second single alongside the release of the video. On 30 November, the group released a 7" vinyl version of the single, accompanied by the previously unreleased B-side "Anyways".

=== Tour ===
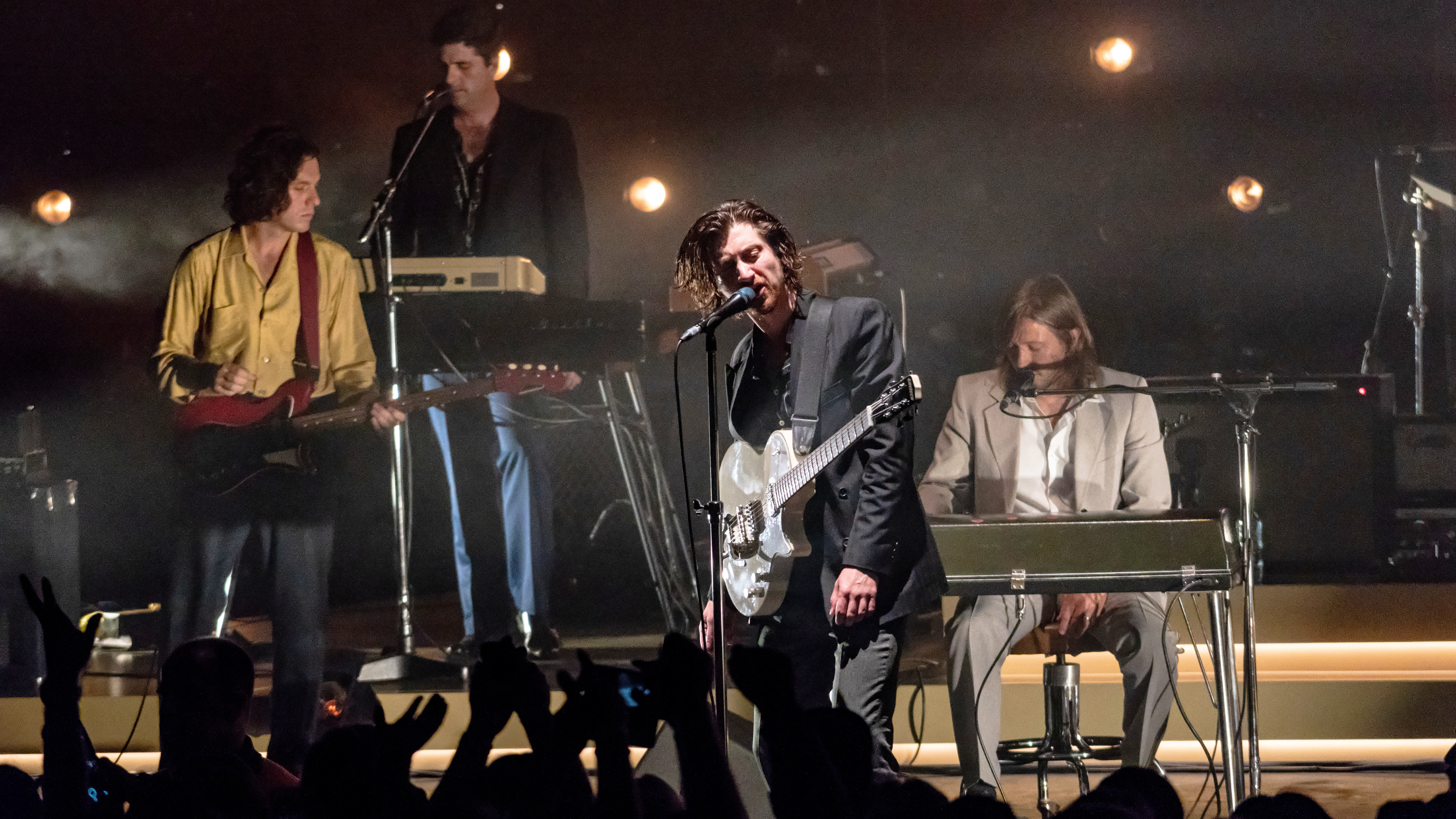
The band performing at the Royal Albert Hall in 2018.

In January 2018, the band announced a tour of North America and Europe which began in May, concluding in October at the Voodoo Experience. In October they extended the tour into April 2019, with dates added in Australia and New Zealand, as well as Latin America. The songs "American Sports", "Four Out of Five", "One Point Perspective" and "She Looks Like Fun" were debuted live in San Diego on 2 May. This was the tour's opening performance, and the Arctic Monkeys' first performance since 2014. For the tour, the group were joined by longtime touring members Tom Rowley and Davey Latter, as well as album contributors Tyler Parkford and Cam Avery, the latter of whom also acted as a supporting act. The band adapted their live show to better fit the stylistic differences of the album's material, with the new shows being described as "sophisticated". Turner's presence was also noted to be more "playful" than on the band's previous tours, attributed to his decreased usage of the guitar, with the band described as embodying "lounge lizard" characters.

The group released the 11-minute documentary film Warp Speed Chic on their YouTube channel in October 2018. The film was directed by Chappell, and features footage of the French leg of the tour, intercut with September 2017 footage of the band recording the album in France. In June 2019, they released another short documentary film depicting the concluding Mexican leg of the tour, again directed by Chappell. A live recording, Live at the Royal Albert Hall, was released in December 2020.

=== Other performances ===
The band made a number of television performances in promotion of the album including on the late-night talk shows The Tonight Show Starring Jimmy Fallon, The Late Late Show with James Corden and The Late Show With Stephen Colbert. In June, they performed live at BBC's Maida Vale Studios, with their performance being broadcast as a Live at the BBC special. Their setlist consisted of songs from Tranquility Base Hotel & Casino, as well as earlier songs. In September, the group released a live rendition of "Four Out of Five" and a cover of an untitled song by Stephen Fretwell as a part of the Spotify Singles series, recorded live at Electric Lady Studios in New York. In January 2019, the band made their debut performance on American music program Austin City Limits.

== Reception ==
=== Critical ===
Professional ratings
Aggregate scores
Source	Rating
AnyDecentMusic?	7.2/10
Metacritic	76/100
Review scores
Source	Rating
AllMusic	3.5/5 stars
Consequence of Sound	B−
The Daily Telegraph	4/5 stars
The Guardian	3/5 stars
The Independent	4/5 stars
NME	4/5 stars
Pitchfork	8.1/10
Q	5/5 stars
Rolling Stone	2/5 stars
Uncut	7/10

Tranquility Base Hotel & Casino received generally favourable reviews from critics, but was described as being "polarising" for listeners. At Metacritic, which assigns a normalised rating out of 100 to reviews from mainstream publications, the album received a score of 76, based on 32 reviews.

Thomas Smith of NME noted that the album was likely to divide listeners, describing it as "the band's most intriguing record to date". Cosette Schulz for Exclaim! suggested against dismissing the album without multiple listens, writing that it "feels like poetic social and fantasy-world commentary penned by Turner, who then fancied having a go at the piano and then brought the whole band in for good measure." For Q, Niall Doherty described it as "a strange, wonderful album, one that almost feels like Arctic Monkeys have embarked on their own full-band side-project". Roisin O'Connor of The Independent described it as "creative, intriguing and completely different". Spin's Larry Fitzmaurice similarly noted the album as the group's "strangest and most alluring", writing that a "sense of heading into the unknown – of charting new and strange artistic territory, accessibility be damned – pervades Tranquility Base Hotel & Casino as a whole, its own adventurousness proving a successful gambit". The Daily Telegraph's Neil McCormick found it to be "a work with its own internal logic that mocks the very notion of artistic integrity". John Robinson for Uncut praised the album as "low-key but engrossing", but noted that "it can be a little one-paced, and a little withholding".

For The Guardian, Alexis Petridis praised the project's humour, but criticised its occasional smugness, noting that the tracks "can feel like less than the sum of their parts". He concluded that the album was an imperfect success which showcased "evidence – albeit flawed – of a certain musical restlessness". Kitty Empire of sister publication The Observer was more positive, writing that despite a chance that the album might be poorly-received, the "voyage into themed purgatory ... is worth it". She praised the album's stylistic deviation from the accessible rock of AM, resulting in "a riveting and immersive listen". AllMusic writer Stephen Thomas Erlewine praised the album, writing that "the expansive aural horizons of Tranquility Base Hotel + Casino suggest there are plenty of avenues for Turner to steer Arctic Monkeys into a fruitful middle age". However, he noted that focused listening revealed careless details, and that the album was hindered by an absence of memorable songs. Similarly, Annie Zaleski of The A.V. Club noted that its lack of "obvious hooks" was its key flaw, with its structureless nature resulting in the album feeling "unmoored and even plodding". In a mixed review for Rolling Stone, Jon Dolan praised the album's ambition but criticised the album as "meandering", concluding that the new stylistic direction "doesn't quite work".

=== Accolades ===
Tranquility Base Hotel & Casino was nominated for the 2018 Mercury Prize, an annual prize awarded to the year's best British or Irish album based solely on said album's merit, regardless of an act's popularity or previous general success. This became the band's fourth nomination for the award: the second most nominations received by any act. The album was nominated for Best Alternative Music Album at the 61st Annual Grammy Awards, with single "Four Out of Five" nominated for Best Rock Performance.

The album also appeared on numerous year-end lists. At Album of the Year, which creates an aggregate of music critic's year-end lists, Tranquility Base Hotel & Casino was listed as the fourteenth best album of the year, with Q and Kitty Empire of The Observer naming it the best album of 2018. Publications including NME, The Independent and Mojo also listed Tranquility Base Hotel & Casino as the year's second best album. Uproxx, BBC Radio 6 Music and Entertainment Weekly included the album in the top five of their year-end lists, with Vulture and The Guardian including the album in their top ten. Publications that listed the album in their top twenty include Flood Magazine, Paste and The Line of Best Fit. Numerous publications included Tranquility Base Hotel & Casino in their top fifty albums of the year, including Crack Magazine, Esquire, musicOMH, Pitchfork, Uncut and Louder Than War, while Noisey listed the album in their top hundred.

At the end of the 2010s, the album was included in decade-end lists by The Independent (48) and NME (53).

== Commercial performance ==
Tranquility Base Hotel & Casino debuted at number one on the UK Albums Chart, with combined sales of 86,000 copies, and became the group's sixth consecutive album to debut at number one in the UK. In addition, with 24,500 vinyl copies sold in the first week, the album became the country's fastest selling vinyl record since 1993, a record held formerly by Liam Gallagher's As You Were. A week following its release, the album was certified silver by the British Phonographic Industry, receiving gold certification on June 1. The album debuted at number one in France, Australia, Scotland, Spain, Belgium, the Netherlands, Switzerland, Greece and Portugal. It additionally reached number two in Ireland, New Zealand, Denmark and Norway, and the top ten in Austria, the Czech Republic, Italy, Canada, Germany, Mexico, Finland, Sweden, Japan and Poland. In the United States, the album debuted at number eight on the Billboard 200 chart, selling 47,000 units, of which 37,000 were in traditional album sales.

== Track listing ==
All tracks are written by Alex Turner.

No.	Title	Length
1.	"Star Treatment"	5:54
2.	"One Point Perspective"	3:28
3.	"American Sports"	2:38
4.	"Tranquility Base Hotel & Casino"	3:31
5.	"Golden Trunks"	2:53
6.	"Four Out of Five"	5:12
7.	"The World's First Ever Monster Truck Front Flip"	3:00
8.	"Science Fiction"	3:05
9.	"She Looks Like Fun"	3:02
10.	"Batphone"	4:31
11.	"The Ultracheese"	3:37
Total length:		40:51

== Personnel ==
Credits adapted from liner notes.

Arctic Monkeys

- Alex Turner – vocals (all tracks), backing vocals (1–10), organ (1–7, 9, 10), piano (1, 2, 4–7, 9, 10), guitar (1, 2, 5–7, 9, 10), bass (4–10), Orchestron (1, 2, 4), synthesiser (7, 10), baritone guitar (1), dolceola (1), harpsichord (4), acoustic guitar (6), drums (10)
- Jamie Cook – guitar (1, 2, 4–9, 11), lap steel (1, 3), acoustic guitar (5), baritone guitar (10)
- Nick O'Malley – bass (1–3, 9, 11), backing vocals (1, 2), guitar (7), baritone guitar (8)
- Matt Helders – drums (1–3, 6, 7, 9, 11), rotary timpani (1), backing vocals (1), synthesisers (8), Farfisa (8)

Additional musicians

- James Ford – drums (1, 4, 7), percussion (1, 5, 6), Orchestron (2, 4, 6), vibraphone (1, 2), pedal steel (1, 11), acoustic guitar (3, 6), piano (8, 11), Farfisa (1), RMI Rocksichord (1), baritone guitar (1), harpsichord (4), synthesiser programming (4), synthesiser (4–6, 9, 10), rotary timpani (6), organ (9)
- Tom Rowley – guitar (5, 8), electric guitar (3, 6), acoustic guitar (5, 8), piano (7, 9), fuzz guitar (3), electric guitar solo (6), acoustic and baritone guitar solo (11)
- Zach Dawes – baritone guitar (3), piano (7)
- Tyler Parkford – piano (3), Farfisa (7)
- Evan Weiss – acoustic guitar (3, 7)
- Loren Humphrey – drums (6, 8, 9, 11)
- James Righton – Wurlitzer (6, 8, 11)
- Josephine Stephenson – piano (6, 8, 11)

Technical

- James Ford – production, engineering (London), mixing
- Alex Turner – production, engineering (Lunar Surface, LA)
- Jimmy Robertson – engineering (La Frette, Paris)
- Nico Quéré – engineering (La Frette, Paris)
- Anthony Cazade – engineering (La Frette, Paris)
- Jonathan Ratovoarisoa – engineering (La Frette, Paris)
- Michael Harris – engineering (Vox, LA)
- Loren Humphrey – engineering (Lunar Surface, LA)

Artwork

- Alex Turner – artwork
- Matthew Cooper – design
- Zackery Michael – photography
- Ben Chappell – band portraits, additional photography

== Charts ==
=== Weekly charts ===
2018 weekly chart performance
Chart (2018)	Peak position
Australian Albums (ARIA)	1
Austrian Albums (Ö3 Austria)	3
Belgian Albums (Ultratop Flanders)	1
Belgian Albums (Ultratop Wallonia)	1
Canadian Albums (Billboard)	4
Czech Albums (ČNS IFPI)	3
Danish Albums (Hitlisten)	2
Dutch Albums (Album Top 100)	1
Finnish Albums (Suomen virallinen lista)	5
French Albums (SNEP)	2
German Albums (Offizielle Top 100)	4
Greek Albums (IFPI)	1
Hungarian Albums (MAHASZ)	19
Irish Albums (IRMA)	2
Italian Albums (FIMI)	3
Japan Hot Albums (Billboard Japan)	19
Japanese Albums (Oricon)	9
Mexican Albums (AMPROFON)	4
New Zealand Albums (RMNZ)	2
Norwegian Albums (VG-lista)	2
Polish Albums (ZPAV)	9
Portuguese Albums (AFP)	1
Scottish Albums (Official Charts)	1
Spanish Albums (Promusicae)	1
Swedish Albums (Sverigetopplistan)	8
Swiss Albums (Schweizer Hitparade)	1
UK Albums (Official Charts)	1
UK Independent Albums (Official Charts)	1
US Billboard 200	8
US Top Rock Albums (Billboard)	1

=== Year-end charts ===
2018 year-end chart performance
Chart (2018)	Position
Australian Albums (ARIA)	85
Belgian Albums (Ultratop Flanders)	10
Belgian Albums (Ultratop Wallonia)	93
Dutch Albums (MegaCharts)	84
French Albums (SNEP)	173
Mexican Albums (AMPROFON)	74
Portuguese Albums (AFP)	22
Spanish Albums (PROMUSICAE)	63
UK Albums (OCC)	18
US Top Rock Albums (Billboard)	76

=== Decade-end charts ===
2010s decade-end chart performance
Chart (2010–2019)	Position
UK Vinyl Albums (OCC)	31

== Certifications ==
Certifications and sales for Tranquility Base Hotel & Casino
Region	Certification	Certified units/sales
United Kingdom (BPI)	Gold	287,000
