= Mini Mansions =

American band

- Mini Mansions, pictured in 2013

Background information
- Origin: Los Angeles, California, U.S.
- Genres: Indie pop; psychedelic pop; glam rock
- Years active: 2009–present
- Members: Michael Shuman; Zach Dawes; Tyler Parkford
- Website: MiniMansions.com

Mini Mansions are an American band founded by Zach Dawes, Tyler Parkford, and Queens of the Stone Age bassist Michael Shuman. Mini Mansions' style has been compared to The Beatles, Elliott Smith, and Fountains of Wayne (though this comparison has drawn some criticism from Michael Shuman of the band).

== History ==
Mini Mansions was founded in 2009 after Queens of the Stone Age decided to take a break after touring in support of Era Vulgaris. Their self-released EP from 2009 contains nine tracks. In 2014, they released the single "Death Is a Girl", that appeared on their second studio album The Great Pretenders, released on March 24, 2015. As of November 2015, videos for the songs "Any Emotions", "Freakout!", "Vertigo" featuring Alex Turner of the Arctic Monkeys, "Mirror Mountain", "Double Visions", "Creeps", and "The End, Again" (all from The Great Pretenders) have been released via the Band's Vevo page. A video for the B-side "Cheap Leather" featuring Fred Schneider of The B-52's has also been released. In 2016, the band released Flashbacks, a compilation album consisting of unreleased b-sides from the recording sessions for The Great Pretenders, via PledgeMusic.

On March 14, 2017, it was announced that the three members of Mini Mansions would be performing with the music band Sparks at the BBC Radio 6 Music Festival in Glasgow, Scotland on March 24, 2017.

On February 12, 2019, the band announced their third full-length album, Guy Walks Into a Bar..., on July 26, 2019. The album was preceded by the Works Every Time EP, released on September 28, 2018.

The band shared their initial single from their Guy... album called "GummyBear" in February 2019 and on March 13, 2019, they premiered the Liam Lynch-directed video for the track and announced an American spring concert tour.

== Members ==
- Michael Shuman − vocals, guitar, bass guitar, keyboards, drums
- Zach Dawes − bass guitar, keyboards
- Tyler Parkford − vocals, keyboards, guitar
- Jon Theodore − drums (touring)

== Discography ==
Studio albums

- Mini Mansions (2010)
- The Great Pretenders (2015)
- Guy Walks Into a Bar... (2019)

Compilation albums

- Flashbacks (2016)

EPs

- Mini Mansions (2009)
- ... Besides ... (2012)
- Works Every Time (2018)

Singles

- "Monk" (2010)
- "Kiddie Hypnogogia" (2010)
- "Wünderbars" (2010)
- "Death Is a Girl" (2014)
- "Any Emotions" (2015)
- "Freakout!" (2015)
- "Vertigo" (2015)
- "Double Visions" (2015)
- "Works Every Time" (2018)
- "Midnight in Tokyo" (2018)
- "GummyBear" (2019)
- "Hey Lover" (2019)
- "Bad Things (That Make You Feel Good)" (2019)
- "I'm in Love" (2019)
