= Shakedown! (theStart album) =

Studio album by theSTART
- Released: July 24, 2001
- Recorded: September–December 1999; December 2000–January 2001
- Studios: Sunset Sound Recorders, Los Angeles, C.A.; Stagg Street Studio, Van Nuys, C.A.; Josh's Garage
- Genres: Punk rock; power pop; synth-pop; new wave revival
- Length: 39:50
- Labels: The Label; Geffen
- Producers: Josh Abraham; theSTART

TheSTART chronology
Shakedown! (2001)	Death via Satellite (2003)

Singles from Shakedown!
- 1. "Gorgeous" Released: May 12, 2001

Shakedown! is the debut studio album by American rock band theSTART. It was released on July 24, 2001, through The Label Records, a short-lived record label owned by The Firm, with distribution from Geffen Records. Vocalist Aimee Echo and keyboardist/bassist Jamie Miller formed theSTART, originally known as Hero, in August 1998, and recruited drummer Scott Ellis and guitarist Mike Smith soon afterwards. After coming to the attention of producer Josh Abraham, the band signed to Abraham's imprint label, JAB Recordings, on 143 and Atlantic Records in July 1999. Originally known as Circles, Shakedown! was first recorded from September to December 1999, with additional recording taking place between December 2000 and January 2001. Original due to be released in the summer of 2000, Shakedown!'s release was delayed by the band switching labels in August 2000 and Smith's exit from the band in October 2000, after which Miller would move from bass to guitar and Jeff Jaeger would be recruited in his place; most of Smith's contributions on the album were re-recorded by Miller.

Upon release, Shakedown! received generally positive reviews from critics, who complimented its futuristic sound and songwriting. The album's sole single, "Gorgeous", was a minor hit and received rotation on MTV2. However, the album was ultimately a commercial failure, and theSTART parted ways with The Label and Geffen five months after its release.

== Music, writing and recording ==
In August 1998, Aimee Echo of Human Waste Project and Jamie Miller of Snot formed a new band called Hero. Echo and Miller had both become disenchanted with the increasingly aggressive nu metal scene that both of their respective bands were based in, and Echo had quit Human Waste Project in July of that year due to creative differences with the other members of the group. The duo subsequently sought to develop a sound that was less heavy and more reflective of their musical tastes and influences, drawing from 1970s and 1980s punk rock and new wave music. The band's sound was also described as power pop and synth-pop. Human Waste Project drummer Scott Ellis and guitarist Mike Smith, a friend of Miller, joined Hero not long after its formation; the band's first rehearsal took place on August 23, 1998, and they played their first show on September 9, 1998.

Hero's live performances were well received, and the band caught the attention of producer Josh Abraham. Abraham became an early supporter of the Hero's music, and subsequently signed the band to JAB Records, an imprint label he had recently established on 143 Records, which in turn was a Warner Music Group label distributed by Atlantic Records. The band signed their record deal with 143/Atlantic/JAB on July 29, 1999, and thereafter headed to Abraham's rehearsal space in Los Angeles to begin work on their debut album. Recording sessions for Hero's debut, then known as Circles, commenced in September 1999, and wrapped up by the end of the year. Brian Virtue engineered the album's recording sessions, whilst Dave Ogilive handled the album's mixing duties. Midway through the album's production, Hero changed their name to theSTART after learning that the name "Hero" was already taken by a number of bands, although this did not affect any of their pre-existing recording plans.

Shakedown! consists of a mix of polished, keyboard-driven material, and more immediate, punchier songs such as "Nemesis" and the album's title track. Miller was responsible for composing the album's music, which was worked on in and out of the studio, whilst Aimee handled the album's lyrics and melodies. Echo's lyrics, which were described as secretive, emotive and sometimes very personal, cover a variety of themes, such as love, loss of love and other people. The album's title track features "veiled sociopolitcal commentary", and "Communion" is "disguised as a love song, [...] but it's really about alien abduction." As Echo or Miller had no expectations of what the band's output should look like, the album's writing process proved to be swift. The album features Troy Van Leeuwen playing guitar on the album's final track, "Time", as well as a recording of Echo and Miller's dog, Eno, howling at a movie scene involving actor Will Ferrell in A Night at the Roxbury (1998) included as a hidden track.

Following its completion, Circles was given a tentative release date of the summer of 2000. However, when 143 Records were unable to get Atlantic to distribute theSTART, JAB Records closed down and the album was shelved. Not long after, The Firm, Inc. offered to buy out theSTART's record contract from 143/Atlantic and make the band the first act on their new record label, The Label Records, which had a pressing-and-distribution (P&D) deal with Geffen Records. The band moved to The Label in August 2000, and Circles' release date was pushed back to January 2001, so The Label had enough time to properly promote the album.

In October 2000, Mike Smith amicably left theSTART to pursue other musical interests. As a result, Miller moved into Smith's position as the band's guitarist, and Jeff Jaeger was hired as the band's new bassist. In December 2000, theSTART recorded two new songs at Sunset Sound Recorders in Los Angeles, "Shakedown!" and "Her Song". Miller and Jaeger re-cut most of the album's guitar and bass tracks, respectively, although Smith's original guitar tracks appear on some of the album's songs. Among other changes, most of Ogilive's mixes were replaced by new ones done by Brian Virtue. Tom Lord-Alge was also brought in to mix the songs "Shakedown!" and "Gorgeous", which The Label considered the album's "focus tracks". Three songs that were intended to appear on Circles, "Be Mine", "Make It Through" and "The Sin Original" (featuring Jay Gordon of Orgy), were cut from the album.

== Release and promotion ==
On February 3, 2001, theSTART announced that Circles had been renamed Shakedown!. On March 2, the album's track listing was revealed. The album was scheduled to be released on June 5, 2001, although in late May it was pushed back to July 24, 2001. A UK release of the album was planned for late 2001 through Geffen, but never occurred. The band performed as an opening act for Strung Out in the UK on November 6, 2002 to see if Geffen would be willing to release the album; response to the band's show was underwhelming, with Drowned in Sound's Mat Hocking commenting that the band was performing to "the wrong audience".

The album's only single, "Gorgeous", was serviced to radio stations on May 12, 2001, and became a minor radio hit for the band. The song's music video, directed by Doug Freidman, features the band performing in front of an audience at the Whiskey a Go-Go in Los Angeles on June 12, 2001. theSTART notified fans of the video's shooting location eight days prior, and a number of the band's fans organized themselves via the band's forums to come to the video shoot dressed in white shirt and black tie. Echo was nearly struck by a lighting fixture during the recording of one of the video's takes, but was not hurt. The video was added to rotation on MTV2 in August 2001.

theSTART toured across the United States (with a few dates in Canada) for four months in support of Shakedown!. The band was initially going to perform on the Vans Warped Tour, though this was cancelled when the band was presented with an offer to tour with Sugar Ray from July 10 to August 18, 2001. Afterwards, theSTART toured as an opening act with Cold for Weezer from September 14 to September 29, 2001. From October 10 to 21, 2001, theSTART toured as an opening act for Incubus, before embarking on a mini-tour of the East Coast of the United States from October 22 and November 1, 2001, which included a performance at CBGB in New York City on October 27, 2001. Afterwards, the band reconvened with Incubus and toured with them again from November 2 to November 9, 2001.

Although theSTART were well received by critics and audiences, Shakedown! was a commercial failure upon its release, and Aimee Echo later remarked that the album had been "destroyed". Echo attributed the album's lack of success to The Label's marketing and promotion of Shakedown!; she remarked that The Label, which only had four people working on the label during its existence, was understaffed and the company had very few connections to its distributor, Geffen. Notably, The Label prevented theSTART from touring in support of Shakedown! until two weeks before the album's release, a decision which she felt hurt its sales. Other factors contributing to the album's low sales was the band's decision to tour with artists whose audiences may not have been receptive to the band's music, and the fact that Shakedown! was released at a time when the nu metal and rap metal genres were at their peak popularity, causing it to get lost in "a manure field of [...] date-rape rock".

After the band's tour with Incubus ended, theSTART were notified that The Label Records was closing down. Aimee Echo said that The Firm, Inc. had "branched itself out in a lot of different directions financially and they didn't feel [like] they wanted to put any more money into the record label", resulting in its closure. The band publicly parted ways with The Label/Geffen in January 2002. At the time of the band's departure from the label, Shakedown! had sold 9,300 copies in the United States, according to Nielsen SoundScan.

== Critical reception ==
Professional ratings
Review scores
Source	Rating
AllMusic	4/5 stars
The Battalion	2/5 stars
The Boston Phoenix	3/4 stars
Drowned In Sound	10/10
In Music We Trust	A−
Montreal Mirror	7.5/10

Shakedown! received generally positive reviews from critics. Mat Hocking of Drowned in Sound awarded the album a perfect 10 rating, hailing it as "a blueprint for a groundbreaking new revolution in rock music." AllMusic's Bret Love said that, outside of a weak mid-section and some issues with "retro kitsch", the album "provides many moments of flashback fun." Julia Watts and Michelle Woodgeard of The Lantern considered Shakedown! to be an "impressive debut album" featuring a "uniquely harsh, yet catchy-pop music quality that could rocket it to stardom." Conversely, The Battalion's Micah Grau awarded the album two stars out of five, criticizing the album's "lack of catchy lyrics, over synthesized sounds, and similar songs".

In February 2002, Shakedown! was ranked seventh on Alternative Press' Critic's Poll for the Top 10 albums of 2001.

== Track listing ==
All lyrics are written by Aimee Echo; all music is composed by Jamie Miller.

No.	Title	Length
1.	"Shakedown!"	3:21
2.	"Gorgeous"	3:29
3.	"Communion"	4:08
4.	"Melt"	3:21
5.	"Hang on Me"	4:14
6.	"Dirty Lion"	3:32
7.	"Her Song"	3:58
8.	"Glimmer Man"	2:38
9.	"Kiss It Better"	3:28
10.	"Nemesis"	3:30
11.	"Time"	4:14
Total length:		39:50

== Personnel ==
Personnel per liner notes.

theSTART
- Aimee Echo – vocals
- Jamie Miller – guitars, synthesizers, backing vocals, additional bass
- Scott Ellis – drums
- Jeff Jaeger – bass, backing vocals

Additional personnel

- Mike Smith – additional guitars
- Cailin McCarthy – backing vocals (1)
- Timothy Teasely – backing vocals (1)
- Michelle Payne – backing vocals (1)
- Nicole Payne – backing vocals (1)
- Troy Van Leeuwen – guitars (11)
- Eno – howling (11)
Production
- Josh Abraham – producer
- Brian Virtue – mixing ( 3–8, 11), engineering
- Dave Ogilive – mixing (9, 10)
- Tom Lord-Alge – mixing (1, 2)
- Tom Baker – mastering (at Precision Mastering)
- Monique Mirahzi – assistant engineer
- Josh Turner – assistant engineer
- Ryan – assistant engineer
- Jeff Left – assistant engineer
- Derek Carlson – assistant engineer
- Pete Magdalena – assistant engineer
- Chris Reynolds – assistant engineer

Art and design

- Les Scurry – production coordination
- Doug Erb – art direction
- Greg Allen – photography
- Joseph Cultice – photography
- Tina Phelan – makeup

== Release history ==
Region	Label	Format	Date	Catalog #	Ref.
United States	The Label; Geffen Records	CD	July 24, 2001	069493049-2	
Canada	The Label; Geffen Records	CD	July 24, 2001	069493049-2	
