= E-lux =

e-lux

Studio album by Human Waste Project
- Released: September 30, 1997
- Recorded: September 13–October 31, 1996
- Studio: Indigo Ranch Studios (Malibu, California)
- Genres: Alternative metal; alternative rock; nu metal
- Length: 47:51
- Labels: Hollywood; Polydor (UK)
- Producer: Ross Robinson

Singles from e-lux
- 1. "Powerstrip" Released: December 8, 1997

e-lux (Note: Stylised as e·lux, has also been styled as "E-lux or "E:lux". Stylised in lowercase.) is the sole studio album by American band Human Waste Project. After signing to Hollywood Records in June 1996, Human Waste Project set about recording an album with producer Ross Robinson. Stylistically, e-lux was inspired by horror movies and has been described as nu metal, alternative metal and alternative rock. The album's original title was "Electralux", but was changed to "e-lux" due to copyright infringement.

e-lux had a troubled development, and the album was delayed multiple times from its planned March 1997 release date due to record company problems to May and June 10, before eventually being released on September 30, 1997. e-lux was met with extremely positive reviews. The album was largely acclaimed by European publications, and as a result the album was eventually issued there in March 1998. While the album did not chart, the album's lone single, "Powerstrip", reached number 85 on the UK Singles Chart.

Human Waste Project toured heavily in support of e-lux. In April 1998, the band was dropped from Hollywood Records; however, they were still able to keep touring thanks to a supporting tour with Coal Chamber, which helped them fund an appearance at Ozzfest in June 1998. Following this, the band played their last show on July 8, 1998 and subsequently disbanded.

== Recording ==
Human Waste Project signed to the Disney-owned record label Hollywood Records on June 6, 1996. They subsequently recorded their debut E-Lux afterwards. The album was recorded between September 13 and October 31, 1996. The album would go on to experience various delays leading up to its eventual September 1997 release. The Malibu fires of 1996 (which forced the group to evacuate the Indigo Ranch studio in order to save their master tapes) and changes in personnel at Hollywood Records contributed to these delays.

== Reception ==
Professional ratings
Review scores
Source	Rating
Allmusic	3/5 stars
Drowned In Sound	8/10
Kerrang!	4/5 stars
Q	4/5 stars
Metal Hammer	7/10
Select	1/5 stars
Vox	3/5 stars

The album received mostly positive reviews from critics. AllMusic's Greg Prato compared the vocals of Aimee Echo to Gwen Stefani of No Doubt and noted that the group, while primarily being heavy metal, "often experiments with the uncommon." In a December 1997 review, Modern Drummer described E-Lux as being "what Courtney Love would sound like if she were really mad, warped, and placed in a agro band." The review also points out that the album's sound includes "a nod to Jane's Addiction and heavy-handed dashes of B-grade horror flick kitsch." In their February 1998 review, Q magazine stated that Echo "has the advantage over some of her shoutier sisters in that she can actually sing", while also praising the other members of the band, saying "Her band proves similarly versatile, switching moods from the harddriving intensity of 'Dog' to the dreamy 'Electra' with ease."

Morgan Lander of Kittie cited E-lux as an influence on the band's debut album, Spit (1999).

== Track listing ==
1. "Graverobbers from Mars" – 1:51
2. "Disease"– 3:24
3. "Drug Store"– 2:40
4. "Exit Wound"– 3:28
5. "Shine" – 4:25
6. "Hold Me Down"– 2:53
7. "Electra"– 3:58
8. "Drowned"– 3:42
9. "Interlude"– 3:02
10. "Powerstrip"– 4:06
11. "One Night in Spain..."– 4:52
12. "Slide"– 3:19
13. "Dog"– 3:25
14. "Get With It"- 2:46

=== B-sides ===
1. "She Gives" - 3:57 (appears on the 1997 "Powerstrip" single)

== Personnel ==
- Aimee Echo – vocals
- Scott Ellis – drums
- Jeff Schartoff – bass
- Mike Tempesta – guitar

== Chart performance ==
=== Singles ===
Year	Title	Chart	Position
1997	"Powerstrip"	UK Singles Chart	85

== Release history ==
Country	Date
United States	September 30, 1997
Europe	March 16, 1998
