= Sweethead (album) =

Studio album by Sweethead
- Released: November 2, 2009
- Recorded: Recorded at Casa de Leones Studios, Happy Ending Studios and Perfect Circle Studios
- Genre: Rock, alternative rock
- Length: 43:19
- Producer: Troy Van Leeuwen

Sweethead chronology
The Great Disruptors EP (2008)	Sweethead (2009)	Descent To The Surface (2016)

Professional ratings
Review scores
Source	Rating
Sputnikmusic	3/5 stars
Contactmusic	(favorable)

Sweethead is the debut album by rock group Sweethead on November 2, 2009 following the release of their EP The Great Disruptors in July of the same year. The album was produced by guitarist Troy Van Leeuwen. The only track to be featured from the EP was The Great Disruptors.

== Track listing ==
No.	Title	Length
1.	"The Sting" (Van Leeuwen, Sims, Nappi, Block)	2:42
2.	"Turned our Backs" (Van Leeuwen, Sims, Block)	2:32
3.	"P.I.G." (Van Leeuwen, Sims, Nappi)	3:03
4.	"Amazing Vanishing Conquest" (Van Leeuwen, Sims)	4:13
5.	"Running Out" (Van Leeuwen, Sims, Nappi, Block)	4:21
6.	"Sinkhole International" (Van Leeuwen, Sims)	3:14
7.	"Remote Control Boys" (Van Leeuwen, Sims, Nappi, Block)	3:14
8.	"Meet in the Road" (Van Leeuwen, Sims)	4:16
9.	"Other Side" (Van Leeuwen, Sims, Nappi)	4:21
10.	"The Great Disruptors" (Van Leeuwen, Sims, Nappi, Block)	3:07
11.	"A.W.O.L." (Van Leeuwen, Sims, Nappi, Block)	2:52
12.	"The Last Evening" (Van Leeuwen, Sims)	5:24

== Personnel ==
Sweethead

- Serrina Sims – vocals
- Troy Van Leeuwen – guitar, backing vocals, keyboards, bass
- Eddie Nappi – bass
- Norm Block – drums

Production personnel

- Troy Van Leeuwen – production, mixing, engineering
- Norm Block – engineering
- Max Allyn – engineering
- Billy Howerdel – engineering
- Justin Smith – engineering
- Alain Johannes – mastering
