= Gone Is Gone =

American metal band

- Origin: Los Angeles, California, U.S.
- Genres: Experimental metal
- Years active: 2016–present
- Labels: Black Dune; Rise; Clouds Hill
- Members: Troy Sanders; Troy Van Leeuwen; Tony Hajjar; Mike Zarin
- Website: goneisgoneofficial.com

Gone Is Gone is an American experimental rock supergroup formed in 2016. It consists of Troy Sanders of Mastodon, Troy Van Leeuwen of Queens of the Stone Age, Tony Hajjar of At the Drive-In and Sparta, as well as Mike Zarin, a multi-instrumentalist and founder of Sencit Music who appeared with Van Leeuwen on Sweethead's Descent to the Surface. The band has released one EP and two studio albums to date.

== Band members ==
- Troy Sanders – lead vocals, bass guitar
- Troy Van Leeuwen – guitar
- Tony Hajjar – drums
- Mike Zarin – guitar, keyboards, backing vocals

== Discography ==
- Gone Is Gone (EP, 2016)
- Echolocation (2017)
- If Everything Happens for a Reason... Then Nothing Really Matters at All (2020)
