= Brian O'Connor (musician) =

American bassist

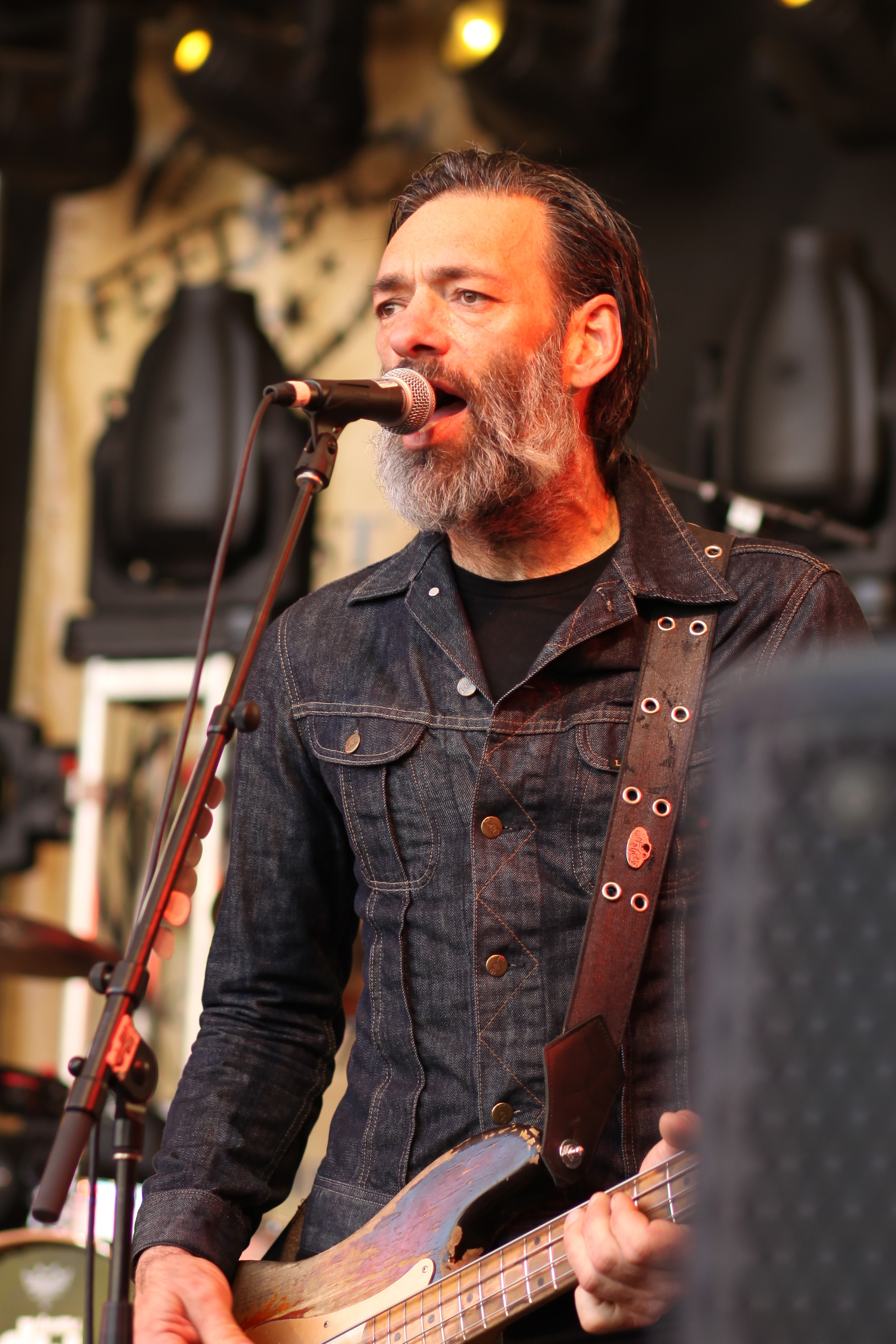
- O'Connor performing with the Eagles of Death Metal in 2013

Background information
- Also known as: B.O.C., Big Hands, Marc McFettridge
- Born: Palm Desert, California, U.S.
- Genres: Stoner rock; desert rock; hard rock
- Occupation: Musician
- Instruments: Bass; guitar; drums; vocals
- Member of: Mojave Lords; ToughMFs

Brian Scott O'Connor is an American musician. Primarily a bassist, he is best known as a touring and recording member of rock band Eagles of Death Metal. He has also appeared on recordings by The Desert Sessions, Masters of Reality, Peaches, Unkle, Axis of Justice and Sweethead.

== Biography ==
O'Connor grew up in the rural community of Carrolls between Kalama and Kelso-Longview, Washington. As a child, he played in a band named Shanna and the Country Bugs with his father and siblings. He worked for many years in construction before joining Eagles of Death Metal.

In June 2010, it was announced that O'Connor had been diagnosed with an unspecified cancer, for which he would be undergoing chemotherapy. A statement from O'Connor in regard to his diagnosis said: "In regards to my current health situation, with the remarkable support and love from my amazing friends and family, I am receiving the best medical and moral attention one could ask for. I cannot thank everyone enough for their continued support and involvement. I am excited for my full recovery and look forward to getting back to what I love most, melting face with my bass. I'm feeling great, after all, I am half unicorn. Keep ya posted."

During his cancer treatment, Dean Fertita of Queens of the Stone Age and The Dead Weather filled in on bass. Long-time friend and collaborator Josh Homme, along with Dave Grohl and John Paul Jones of Them Crooked Vultures, announced a concert at the Brixton Academy in London to raise money for O'Connor's treatment.

On August 12, 2010, Queens of The Stone Age, Eagles of Death Metal, The Last Shadow Puppets and Alain Johannes performed a benefit show at the Nokia Club in Los Angeles to raise funds for O'Connor. Former Queens of the Stone Age member Mark Lanegan sang four encore songs with the band.

In 2013, O'Connor played the character Talan Gwynek in the horror movie Wer. He left Eagles of Death Metal in 2014 after nine years with the band.

== Equipment ==
With Eagles of Death Metal, O'Connor used a worn Fender Precision Bass, Orange and Ampeg SVT bass amplifiers, and Orange bass cabinets. He also uses the ProCo Rat distortion pedal in addition to other pedals.

== Discography ==
With Eagles of Death Metal

- Death by Sexy (2006)
- Heart On (2008)

With Unkle

- Nights Temper EP (2007)
- War Stories (2007)

With Masters of Reality

- Pine Cross Dover (2009)

With Mojave Lords

- Unfuckwithable (2014)

Other appearances

- The Desert Sessions – Volumes 9 & 10 (2003)
- Axis of Justice – Concert Series - Volume 1 (2004)
- Peaches – Impeach My Bush (2006)
- Earthlings? – Humalian (EP) (2009)
- Sweethead – Descent To The Surface (2016)
