= Aimee Echo =

American singer

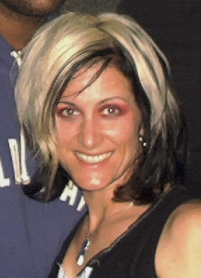
- Aimee Echo in 2003

Background information
- Born: Aimee Echo Rodrigues; March 27, 1970 (age 56); California, U.S.
- Genres: Punk rock; alternative rock; power pop; new wave revival; alternative metal
- Occupations: Singer; songwriter
- Years active: 1992–present
- Member of: theSTART
- Formerly of: Human Waste Project; Normandie
- Spouse: Jamie Miller (m. 2012)

Aimee Echo (née Rodrigues; born March 27, 1970) is an American singer. She rose to prominence as the singer of Human Waste Project, who she fronted between 1994 until the band's dissolution in 1998. Afterwards, she became the frontwoman of theSTART, which she co-founded with her husband Jamie Miller, and its side project Normandie.

== Personal life ==
Echo is a practitioner and authorized teacher of ashtanga yoga. She began practicing Yoga with Noah Williams and Kimberly Flynn in Los Angeles in 1999. She travelled to India annually beginning in 2007 to study with Sri K. Pattabhi Jois, his grandson R. Sharath, and daughter Saraswati at KPJAYI. She received authorization to teach Ashtanga Yoga from R. Sharath in 2010. She is a graduate of the Institute for Integrative Nutrition, a certified health coach, and a certified massage therapist. She was a primary teacher at Jois Yoga. She is the owner of Ashtanga Yoga Long Beach. She is married to Jamie Miller, drummer of Bad Religion, and lives in Zaferia, Long Beach.

== Discography ==
Human Waste Project

theSTART

Guest appearances

- Red Hot Chili Peppers – One Hot Minute (1995)
- Dave Navarro – Rhimorse (EP) (1995)
- Cradle of Thorns – Download This! (1996)
- Tura Satana – All Is Not Well (1997)
- Coal Chamber – Chamber Music (1999)
- Papa Roach – Infest (2000)
- Snot – Strait Up (2000)
- Professional Murder Music – Professional Murder Music (2001)
- Deadsy – (Colossus) (2001)
- Look What I Did – Minuteman for the Moment (2005)
- Teddybears – "Punkrocker" & "Yours to Keep" (2007) – live including Coachella Valley Music and Arts Festival and appearance on Last Call with Carson Daly
- Street Drum Corps – We Are Machines (2008)
- Night Horse – Perdition Hymns (2010)
