= Alive! (Snot album) =

Live album by Snot
- Released: July 30, 2002
- Recorded: May 1998
- Venue: The Palace (Hollywood, California)
- Genre: Nu metal; funk metal; hardcore punk
- Length: 46:18
- Label: Geffen; Hip-O
- Producer: Mikey Doling; John Fahnestock (co.)

Snot chronology
Strait Up (2000)	Alive! (2002)

Professional ratings
Review scores
Source	Rating
Allmusic	4/5 stars

Alive! is a live album by Snot. The songs were all performed and recorded at The Palace in Hollywood, California in May 1998. Released on July 30, 2002, it peaked at #12 on the Billboard Heatseekers chart.

In his review of the album, Allmusic's Bradley Torreano wrote, "Those who wonder what the big deal about this band is should start here, as this offers an optimum performance from a band that was only starting to develop when their career was sadly cut short."

The album features the song "Choose What?", one of only two tracks the band completed for their cancelled second album (the other being "Absent", which appeared on the soundtrack for the film Strangeland). The song, with altered lyrics, was included on the Strait Up album under the title "Starlit Eyes" with System of a Down frontman Serj Tankian on vocals.

== Track listing ==
1. "Intro" - 0:40
2. "Snot" - 3:53
3. "Joy Ride" - 2:43
4. "I Jus' Lie" - 3:56
5. "Stoopid" - 4:00
6. "The Box" - 3:25
7. "Snooze Button" - 5:06
8. "Absent" - 4:44
9. "Deadfall" - 2:27
10. "Get Some" - 5:43
11. "Tecato" - 6:20
12. "Choose What?" - 3:20 (studio track)
13. "Joy Ride" (multimedia track)
14. "Stoopid" (multimedia track)

== Personnel ==
Snot

- Lynn Strait – vocals
- Mikey Doling – guitar, producer, design concept
- John "Tumor" Fahnestock – bass, co-producer, design concept
- Jamie Miller – drums

Additional personnel

- Biff Dawes – engineer
- Ross Robinson – engineer (12)
- Adam Greenspan – overdubs
- Donat Kazarinoff – overdubs
- Mark Casselman – additional engineering, mixing, mastering
- Nic Adler – executive producer
- Sean Henning – executive producer
