= Handsome (band) =

American rock band

- Handsome in 1997

Background information
- Origin: United States
- Genres: Post-hardcore; alternative metal
- Years active: 1995–1998
- Labels: Full City Blend; Sub Pop; Epic
- Past members: Jeremy Chatelain; Peter Mengede; Tom Capone; Eddie Nappi; Pete Hines; Donny Campion

Handsome was an American rock supergroup formed in 1995. The group's lineup was singer Jeremy Chatelain, guitarists Peter Mengede (formerly of Helmet), Tom Capone (formerly of Quicksand), bassist Eddie Nappi, and drummer Pete Hines (formerly of Cro-Mags and Murphy's Law). Capone would leave the group in 1997, replaced by Donny Campion (formerly of Electric Love Hogs). They released two 7" vinyl singles in 1995, two CD singles in 1997 and one album, Handsome (1997), through Epic/Sony before disbanding.

== History ==
Handsome was conceived by Australian guitarist Peter Mengede, who was in the New York band Helmet from 1989 to 1993. Mengede was ousted from Helmet by frontman Page Hamilton, due to his dissatisfaction with their songwriting process. Mengede envisioned Handsome as being a band where all members would have an equal say.

By 1995, Mengede had recruited former Quicksand guitarist Tom Capone and former Cro-Mags and Murphy's Law drummer Pete Hines as well as bassist Eddie Nappi and Salt Lake City native Jeremy Chatelain. Regarding who came up with their name, drummer Pete Hines said in 1997, "Peter [Mengede] did. Tar from Chicago had an album called Handsome that he really liked and he thought it was a cool name. I'm psyched about it because all the names from New York are like Sick of It All, Biohazard, all these tough guy kinda names. I mean, New York's known for that, and we wanted to have a little tension [surrounding the name]." In 2023, Mengede claimed another reason he chose the name "Handsome" was so that the band would alphabetically come before Helmet at record stores.

After a short tour of the midwest with Deftones, they began recording material with producer Terry Date with the album, titled Handsome, released on February 4, 1997 through Epic/Sony. Peter Stepek, of AllMusic gave the album a positive review stating:

"Handsome delivers a distinctive hybrid that is complex and interesting, particularly when, as in 'Eden Complex,' the band shifts effortlessly from one hook filled section to the next. Should satisfy people who are looking for an intelligible yet hard(core) alternative."

In support of the album, Handsome toured with Silverchair, Local H, Less Than Jake and ALL (3/4 Descendents) in the US, while they supported Wu-Tang Clan and Voodoo Glow Skulls in Europe. Prior to their June 1997 shows in Europe, guitarist Capone left the group and was replaced by former Electric Love Hogs guitarist Donny Campion. In July 1997, the band played select dates at that year's Warped Tour. Following this, Handsome disbanded, with Mengede citing tensions within the band. They originally signed a three record deal with Epic, and had been working on new material, but were let go from the contract through a clause that had been enacted when Capone left.

=== Post-breakup ===
Handsome was Peter Mengede's last musical project in the United States, as he returned to Australia during late 2001, after having lived in New York for 15 years. He later formed the Brisbane band El Gordo. Following his departure from the group, Capone worked on numerous projects before forming his own, Adharma, in 2000, while singer Chatelain joined Blake Schwarzenbach's group Jets to Brazil before going on to join Helmet. Bassist Eddie Nappi went on to join the Mark Lanegan Band while he also worked with Queens of the Stone Age and former A Perfect Circle guitarist Troy Van Leeuwen in Enemy and is also a member of Van Leeuwen's latest group Sweethead.

== Musical style ==
Their sound has been compared to Deftones and Far. Pete Hines stated from the outset that the band knew they wanted "a melodic singer over really heavy music".

== Legacy ==
While Handsome failed to attain commercial success, their 1997 self-titled album has since received praise from contemporary critics. Kerrang! listed Handsome as one of the "12 most underrated albums of the '90s", while Louder Sound included them on a list of the "top 50 cult metal bands".

== Members ==
Final lineup

- Jeremy Chatelain – vocals (1995–1998)
- Peter Mengede – guitar (1995–1998)
- Eddie Nappi – bass (1995–1998)
- Pete Hines – drums (1995–1998)
- Donni Campion – guitar (1997–1998)

Former members

- Tom Capone – guitar (1995–1997)

== Discography ==
Studio albums

Title	Details
Handsome	Released: February 4, 1997; Label: Epic; Formats: CD, CS, LP

Singles

Title	Year	Album
"Swimming" / "Can't Connect"	1995	non-album single
"Waiting" / "Needles"	1995	non-album single
"Needles"	1997	Handsome
"Dim the Lights"	1997	Handsome
