= Big Hands =

Big Hands may refer to

- Gary "Big Hands" Johnson, American football player
- Brian O'Connor (bassist)
