= The Great Disruptors =

EP by Sweethead
- Released: July 13, 2009
- Recorded: Recorded at Casa de Leones Studios and Happy Ending Studios
- Genre: Rock, alternative rock
- Length: 17:01
- Producer: Troy Van Leeuwen

Sweethead chronology
| The Great Disruptors (2009) | Sweethead (2009) |

Professional ratings
Review scores
| Source | Rating |
|---|---|
| Chronicles of Chaos | 7/10 stars |

The Great Disruptors is the first EP by American rock band Sweethead and was released on July 13, 2009. It included a cover of The Kinks' "Tired of Waiting for You" which can also be downloaded for free at the band's website.

== Track listing ==
All tracks written by Sims, Van Leeuwen, Nappi and Block except where noted.

| No. | Title | Length |
|---|---|---|
| 1. | "The Great Disruptors" (Sims, Van Leeuwen, Block) | 3:07 |
| 2. | "Hardspun" | 2:21 |
| 3. | "Arcane Arcade" | 3:11 |
| 4. | "Traumatized and Dumb" | 5:31 |
| 5. | "Tired of Waiting for You" (Ray Davies) | 2:51 |

== Personnel ==
Sweethead

- Serrina Sims – vocals
- Troy Van Leeuwen – guitar, backing vocals, keyboards, bass
- Eddie Nappi – bass
- Norm Block – drums

Production personnel

- Troy Van Leeuwen – production, mixing, engineering
- Eddie Nappi – engineering
- Alain Johannes – mastering
