= 60 Cycle =

American rock band

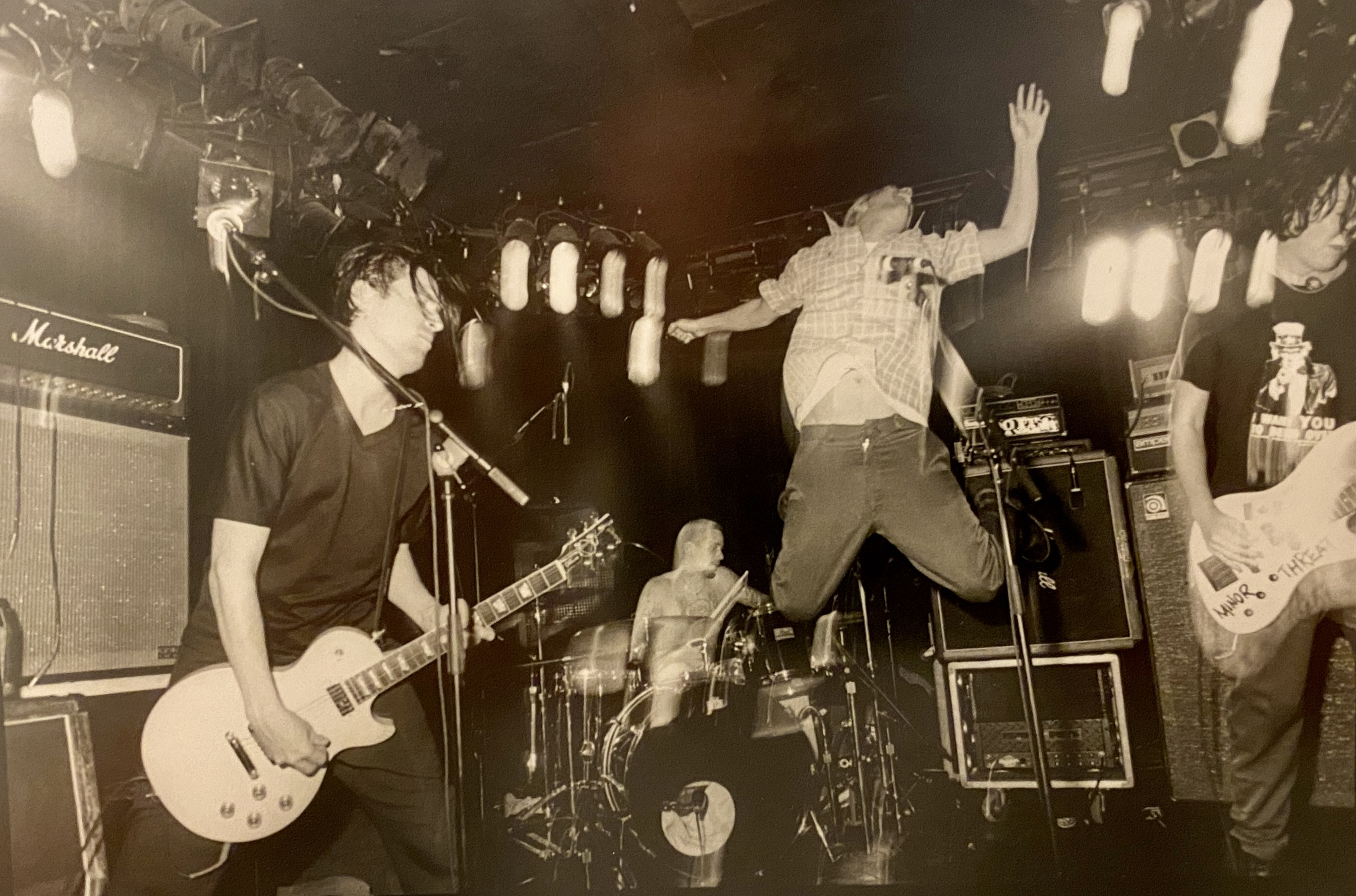

60 Cycle was an American rock band from Los Angeles, California, United States, formed in 1993. The band's line-up included founder and principal songwriter Joey Rubenstein(lead vocals, guitar), Troy Van Leeuwen (guitar, backing vocals), Glen Vagas (bass guitar,), and Dieter Hartmann (drums).

60 Cycle developed a style of power pop/punk music and was known for its unique melodic song craft and tight live performances. Before disbanding in 1996, the group released one self-titled record produced by Josh Abraham. The band contributed a song titled "Strapper" to the soundtrack of the 1998 film Boogie Boy starring Joan Jett and Traci Lords.

After the group's demise, Van Leeuwen and Scott went on to tour with the band Failure while Rubenstein joined the group Fluorescein. Both of these outfits garnered major label recording contracts and moderate touring success. Hartmann later developed a career as a composer for film and television www.dieterhartmann.com, while Van Leeuwen went on to play with notable acts such as A Perfect Circle and Queens of the Stone Age.
