= Get Some (album) =

Studio album by Snot
- Released: May 27, 1997
- Recorded: October–November 1996
- Studios: Long View Farm (North Brookfield, Massachusetts)
- Genres: Nu metal; funk metal; hardcore punk
- Length: 48:14
- Label: Geffen
- Producer: T-Ray

Snot chronology
Get Some (1997)	Strait Up (2000)

Singles from Get Some
- 1. "The Box" Released: 1997

Get Some is the debut studio album by the American nu metal band Snot. Released in 1997, it is the only album that features the band's original vocalist, Lynn Strait, who was killed in a car accident in December 1998 when a truck struck his car, killing him and his boxer Dobbs, who appears on the album cover.

== Musical style and influences ==
The album mixes elements of genres such as metal, hardcore punk and funk, in addition to experimenting with country on "Deadfall" and soft lounge-style music on the shorter interlude tracks. In a 2025 interview, bassist John Fahnestock said the band were influenced by Faith No More on the album, reflecting "we all love Faith No More. Faith No More does all kinds of crazy shit music genre wise, and I think it's a lot of the influence of what Snot was about, where every single song is kind of a lot different from the first, but they all fit together like a puzzle."

== Release and reception ==
Professional ratings
Review scores
Source	Rating
AllMusic	2.5/5 stars

Recorded in October and November 1996, the album was released on May 27, 1997, by Geffen Records.

In 1997, the Gavin Report gave the music a positive review, describing it as being original and mixing "crunchy guitars, low-end rhythms, and mutated funk grinds." Australian publication Tone Deaf reflected in 2015 that, "when Snot released their debut album Get Some in 1997 it was heralded as one of the most melodic, groove laden offerings of [the] nu metal scene", adding that "the album found immediate critical favor and won the band a legion of dedicated Snot Heads."

In 2022, Revolver featured Get Some on a list of "Top 5 One-Album Wonders", and labelled the music as a mix of "Red Hot Chili Peppers-esque funk-rock with sprinting hardcore thrashers and rambunctious Bizkit-ian rap-metal." In 2021, the staff of Revolver also included the album in their list of the "20 Essential Nu-Metal Albums".

== Track listing ==
All lyrics are written by Lynn Strait, except "Tecato", written by Lynn Strait and Peter Gardner; all music is composed by Snot.

No.	Title	Length
1.	"Snot"	3:23
2.	"Stoopid"	3:53
3.	"Joy Ride"	2:26
4.	"The Box"	3:25
5.	"Snooze Button"	4:17
6.	"313" (Instrumental)	2:25
7.	"Get Some"	4:56
8.	"Deadfall"	2:19
9.	"I Jus' Lie"	3:34
10.	"Get Some O' Deez" (Instrumental)	0:58
11.	"Unplugged"	4:11
12.	"Tecato"	4:30
13.	"Mr. Brett" (featuring Theo Kogan)	2:13
14.	"Get Some Keez" (Instrumental)	2:46
15.	"My Balls"	2:58
Total length:		48:14

== Personnel ==
Snot

- Lynn Strait – vocals
- Sonny Mayo – guitar
- Mikey Doling – guitar
- John Fahnestock – bass
- Jamie Miller – drums

Additional musicians

- Dave Fortman – guitar on "Deadfall"
- Glenn Nelson – banjo on "Deadfall"
- Theo Kogan – vocals on "Mr. Brett"

Production

- T-Ray – production
- Anton Pukshansky – engineering
- Jesse Henderson – assistant engineering
- Fran Flannery – assistant engineering
- Kelly Wohlford – assistant engineering
- Phil Nicolo – mixing
- Tom Coyne – mastering
- Nic Adler – executive production
- Sean Henning – executive production
- Wendy Sherman – art direction
- David Leaman – illustration
- Jon Gipe – photography
