= TheStart =

American rock band

theSTART
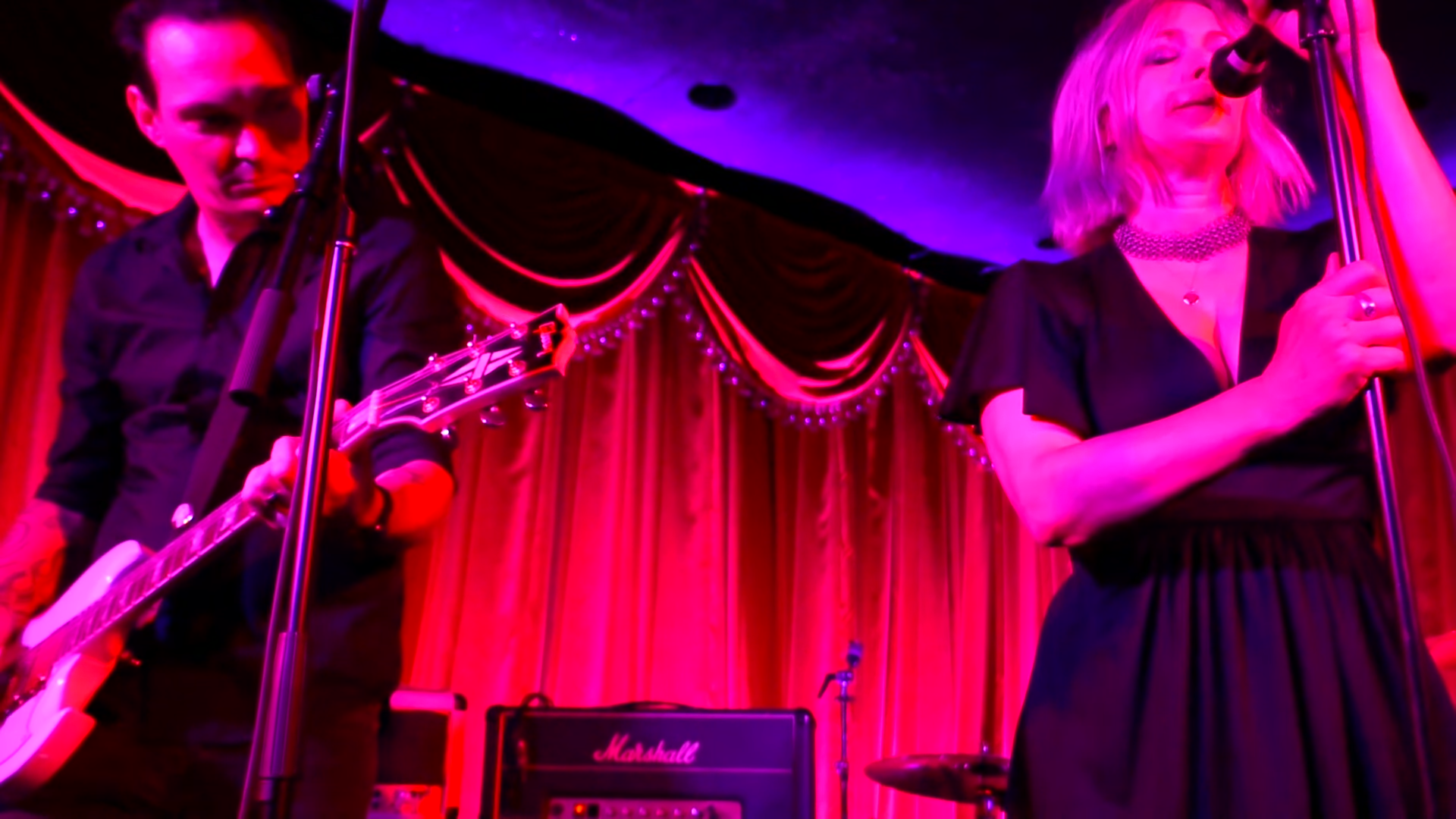
- Miller and Echo performing with theSTART in 2019

Background information
- Also known as: Hero (1998–1999)
- Origin: Los Angeles, California, U.S.
- Genres: Alternative rock; synth-pop; new wave revival
- Years active: 1998–present
- Labels: 143; Atlantic; The Label; Geffen; Autonomy; Small Stone; Nitro; Metropolis; New Black
- Spinoffs: Normandie
- Spinoff of: Human Waste Project
- Members: Aimee Echo; Jamie Miller
- Past members: Mike Smith; Jeff Jaeger; Billy Brimblecom Jr. Erick Sanger; Scott Ellis; Lance Webber; Chelsea Davis
- Website: thisisthestart.com

theStart (stylized as theSTART) is an American rock band from Los Angeles, California.

== History ==
Aimee Echo and Jamie Miller formed the band in 1998, originally named Hero. They changed it to theStart on October 31, 1999, because "Hero" was already being used by many other bands. Their starting lineup included Echo on vocals, Miller on bass and synths, Scott Ellis (who played with Echo in Human Waste Project) on drums and Mike Smith on guitars. When Smith left the band in October 2000 to pursue other musical interests, Jamie switched over from bass to guitars, and Jeff Jaeger was hired as the band's new bassist. Their debut album, Shakedown!, was released in July 2001 through The Label Records, a record label imprint of The Firm, Inc., with distribution from Geffen Records.

Following a period of touring, they discovered that their record label was closing. The band decided to fund their next EP themselves, releasing The 1234 in April 2002 and selling it at their shows. Shortly thereafter, they announced the departure of Scott Ellis. While spending the summer touring with Scarling., they found a distributor in Small Stone Records for a self-titled EP.

Jaeger left the group some time after Ellis did. Over the next year, the group found replacements, bringing in Erick Sanger and Billy Brimblecon Jr. With their new lineup, the group was signed to Nitro Records in October 2003, which re-released their self-titled EP as Death Via Satellite. Over the next year they recorded a new album, and Initiation was released on August 24, 2004.

Brimblecon left the group shortly before the release of Initiation, and the album's supporting tour featured a number of interim drummers, including Adrian Young (of No Doubt) and Frank Zummo (of Sum 41). Chelsea Davis was later selected as a permanent replacement. Later, in 2006, Sanger was let go from the group, replaced by Lance Webber. The group changed labels in 2007, moving from Nitro to their current label, Metropolis Records. Later that year, they released Ciao, Baby. After Lance Webber returned to college in 2009, Aimee, Jamie and Chelsea started a side project called Normandie, and toured as a trio.

In 2015, Miller became the drummer for Bad Religion, replacing the band's longtime drummer, Brooks Wackerman.

In 2017, the band released a 7-inch single for "Yvonne DeCarlo" and "Magic Number".

== Band members ==
Current members

- Aimee Echo – lead vocals (1998–present)
- Jamie Miller – bass (1998–2000), guitar (2000–present), synth, backing vocals (1998–present)

Touring members

- Adrian Young – drums (2004, 2006)
- Frank Zummo – drums (2004–2006)
- Lance Webber – bass (2006–2009)
- ??? – bass (2019–2020)

Former members

- Mike Smith – guitar (1998–2000)
- Jeff Jaeger – bass, backing vocals (2000–2002)
- Erick Sanger – bass, backing vocals (2003–2006)
- Scott Ellis – drums (1998–2002)
- Billy Brimblecom Jr. – drums (2003–2004, 2019–2020)
- Chelsea Davis – drums (2007–2012)

Timeline

== Discography ==
Studio albums

Title	Album details
Shakedown!	Released: July 24, 2001; Label: The Label/Geffen; Format: CD
Initiation	Released: August 24, 2004; Label: Nitro; Format: CD
Ciao, Baby	Released: June 5, 2007; Label: Metropolis; Format: CD

EPs

Title	Album details
The 1234 EP	Released: April 10, 2002; Label: Autonomy (self-released); Format: CD
theSTART (aka Death Via Satellite)	Released: August 1, 2002 December 9, 2003 (reissue); Label: Small Stone, Nitro; Format: CD

Singles

Title	Year	Album
"Gorgeous"	2001	Shakedown!
"The 1234"	2003	Death Via Satellite
"Blood on My Hands"	2007	Ciao, Baby
"Yvonne DeCarlo/Magic Number"	2017	non-album single

Music videos

Title	Year	Director(s)	Album
"Gorgeous"	2001	Doug Friedman	Shakedown!
"The 1234"	2003	Heath and Dave Lowbrow (The Lowbrow Bros.)	Death Via Satellite
"Like Days"	2004	Heath and Dave Lowbrow (The Lowbrow Bros.)	Initiation
