= Mike Smith (guitarist) =

American guitarist (born 1973)

- Born: October 11, 1973 (age 52); Middle River, Maryland, U.S.
- Genres: Alternative metal; funk metal; nu metal; alternative rock; rap metal
- Occupation: Musician
- Instruments: Guitar; vocals
- Years active: 1993–present
- Member of: Shedding Light
- Formerly of: Snot; TheStart; Limp Bizkit

Mike Smith (born October 11, 1973) is an American musician, best known as the former guitarist of Snot, TheStart, and Limp Bizkit.

== Career ==
Mike Smith played guitar for the hard rock band Rumbledog from 1993 to 1996 and appeared on the albums Rumbledog and The Drowning Pool. That band fired its singer and regrouped under the name Burning Orange, releasing the album Taar in 1996 before breaking up.

Smith was then recruited by Snot in 1998 to replace guitarist Sonny Mayo. He did not contribute to any Snot releases but toured with the band intermittently in later years. Smith was then briefly a member of TheStart in 1999-2000 and made some contributions to that band's debut album Shakedown!.

Smith was next recruited by Limp Bizkit in 2002 to replace guitarist Wes Borland after a nationwide search with thousands of auditions. He appeared on the 2003 album Results May Vary. During an early live performance with Limp Bizkit, Smith was injured onstage and diagnosed with a pinched nerve. Smith left the band in 2004 due to musical differences.

Smith then moved to Baltimore, Maryland and founded the band Evolver in which he served as both guitarist and lead vocalist. This band was active until 2013, having released two albums, and then regrouped in 2018 under the name Shedding Light. Smith has also worked as a guitar teacher.
