= Strait Up =

Studio album by Snot
- Released: November 7, 2000
- Recorded: 1998–2000
- Studio: 4th Street Recording (Santa Monica, California); Grand Master Studios (Hollywood, California); Westlake Studios (West Hollywood, California)
- Genre: Alternative metal; nu metal
- Length: 50:17
- Label: Immortal; Virgin
- Producer: Mike Doling; John "Tumor" Fahnestock; Jim Wirt; Ross Robinson

Snot chronology
Get Some (1997)	Strait Up (2000)	Alive! (2002)

Alternative cover

Strait Up is the second studio album by the American nu metal band Snot, released on November 7, 2000. The album features appearances by various alternative metal musicians. The album was released as a tribute to Snot's original lead singer Lynn Strait, who was killed in a car accident on December 11, 1998.

== Reception ==
Professional ratings
Review scores
Source	Rating
AllMusic	2.5/5 stars

The album peaked at No. 56 on the Billboard 200. CMJ called the album "A vivid cross section of nu-metal styles". Melody Maker gave the album 4 stars out of 5 and said that "The riffs are diamond hard and magnificently driven... the best of the band is found in their quieter moments." It won a 2000 Metal Edge Readers' Choice Award for Hits/Compilation/Live Album of the Year.

== Track listing ==
No.	Title	Lyrics	Music	Length
1.	"Starlit Eyes" (featuring Serj Tankian of System of a Down)	Serj Tankian	Mikey Doling; John Fahnestock; Jamie Miller	2:58
2.	"Take It Back" (featuring Jonathan Davis of Korn)	Jonathan Davis; Nathan Cox	Doling; Fahnestock	3:03
3.	"I Know Where You're At" (featuring M.C.U.D. of Hed PE)	Jared Gomes	Doling; Fahnestock	4:39
4.	"Catch a Spirit" (featuring Max Cavalera of Soulfly)	Max Cavalera	Doling; Fahnestock	3:55
5.	"Until Next Time" (featuring Jason Sears of R.K.L.)	Jason Sears	Lynn Strait; Doling; Fahnestock	3:11
6.	"Divided (An Argument for the Soul)" (featuring Brandon Boyd of Incubus)	Brandon Boyd	Doling; Fahnestock	3:46
7.	"Ozzy Speaks" (a spoken word track featuring Ozzy Osbourne)			0:16
8.	"Angel's Son" (featuring Lajon Witherspoon, Clint Lowery, and Morgan Rose of Sevendust)	Lajon Witherspoon; Clint Lowery	Lowery	3:49
9.	"Forever" (featuring Fred Durst of Limp Bizkit)	Fred Durst	Doling; Fahnestock	2:55
10.	"Funeral Flights" (featuring Dez Fafara of Coal Chamber)	Dez Fafara	Doling; Fahnestock	2:59
11.	"Requiem" (featuring Corey Taylor of Slipknot)	Corey Taylor; Doling; Fahnestock	Doling; Fahnestock	3:36
12.	"Reaching Out" (featuring Mark McGrath of Sugar Ray & Whitfield Crane of Ugly Kid Joe)	Mark McGrath; Whitfield Crane; Fahnestock; Stan Frazier; Doling	Doling; Fahnestock	4:39
13.	"Absent" (one of only two completed tracks for Snot's unfinished second album (appears on Strangeland's soundtrack featuring backing vocals by Aimee Echo))	Strait	Snot	5:30
14.	"Sad Air" (a spoken word track featuring Lynn Strait, with backing guitar by Snot guitarist Sonny Mayo)	Strait	Sonny Mayo	2:11
15.	"Strait Up" (a hidden track that is mixed by DJ Lethal)			5:58
Total length:				50:17

Note: On streaming, Ozzy Speaks is cut, and a song called 'Untitled' is added after 'Absent'

'Untitled' plays the song Absent, with Sad Air added at the end of the track.

The song erroneously labelled as "Sad Air Lynn Strait" plays Strait Up from the physical release.

== Personnel ==
Credits adapted from album's liner notes.

Snot

- Lynn Strait – vocals (tracks 13), spoken word (track 14)
- Mike Doling – guitars (tracks 1–6, 8–13), additional vocals (tracks 11, 12)
- Sonny Mayo – guitars (tracks 8, 10, 14), programming (track 14)
- John Fahnestock – bass (tracks 1–6, 8–13), additional vocals (tracks 11, 12)
- Jamie Miller – drums (track 13)

Guest musicians

- Brandon Boyd – vocals (track 6)
- Max Cavalera – vocals (track 4)
- Mike "Mad Dog" Combs – additional guitars (track 10)
- Nathan Cox – additional vocals (track 2)
- Whitfield Crane – additional vocals (track 12)
- Jonathan Davis – vocals (track 2)
- Marcello Dias – additional bass (track 4)
- Fred Durst – vocals (track 9)
- Aimee Echo – additional vocals (track 13)
- Klaus Eichstad – additional guitars (track 9)
- Dez Fafara – vocals (track 10)
- Stan Frazier – additional vocals (track 12)
- Jared "M.C.U.D." Gomes – vocals (track 3)
- Shannon Larkin – drums (tracks 1–6, 9–12)
- Clint Lowery – guitar and vocals (track 8)
- Mark McGrath – vocals (track 12)
- Shavo Odadjian – additional bass (track 4)
- Ozzy Osbourne – spoken word (track 7)
- DJ Product – turntables (track 3)
- Morgan Rose – drums (track 8)
- Jason Sears – vocals (track 5)
- Serj Tankian – vocals (track 1)
- Corey Taylor – vocals (track 11)
- Jim Wirt – strings (track 6), Hammond organ (track 8), piano (track 12)
- Lajon Witherspoon – vocals (track 8)

Production

- Nic Adler – executive producer
- Andrew Alekel – additional engineering
- Stefan Broadley – Pro Tools, programming
- Terry Date – vocal engineer (track 9)
- Mike Doling – producer (tracks 1–6, 8–12)
- John Fahnestock – producer (tracks 1–6, 9–12), art concept
- Diane Gallemore – front cover photo
- Sean Henning – executive producer
- Dave Holdridge – Pro Tools
- Donat Kazarinoff – engineer (track 14), pro-tools, programming
- Marek – assistant mix engineer
- Steve Piper – Pro Tools
- Justin Risley – Pro Tools
- Ross Robinson – producer (track 13)
- Wendy Sherman – art direction and design
- Happy Walters – co-executive producer
- Rick Will – mixing
- Jim Wirt – producer (tracks 1–6, 9–12), co-producer (track 8), engineer (tracks 1-6, 8-12)
