= Jamie Miller (drummer) =

American rock musician

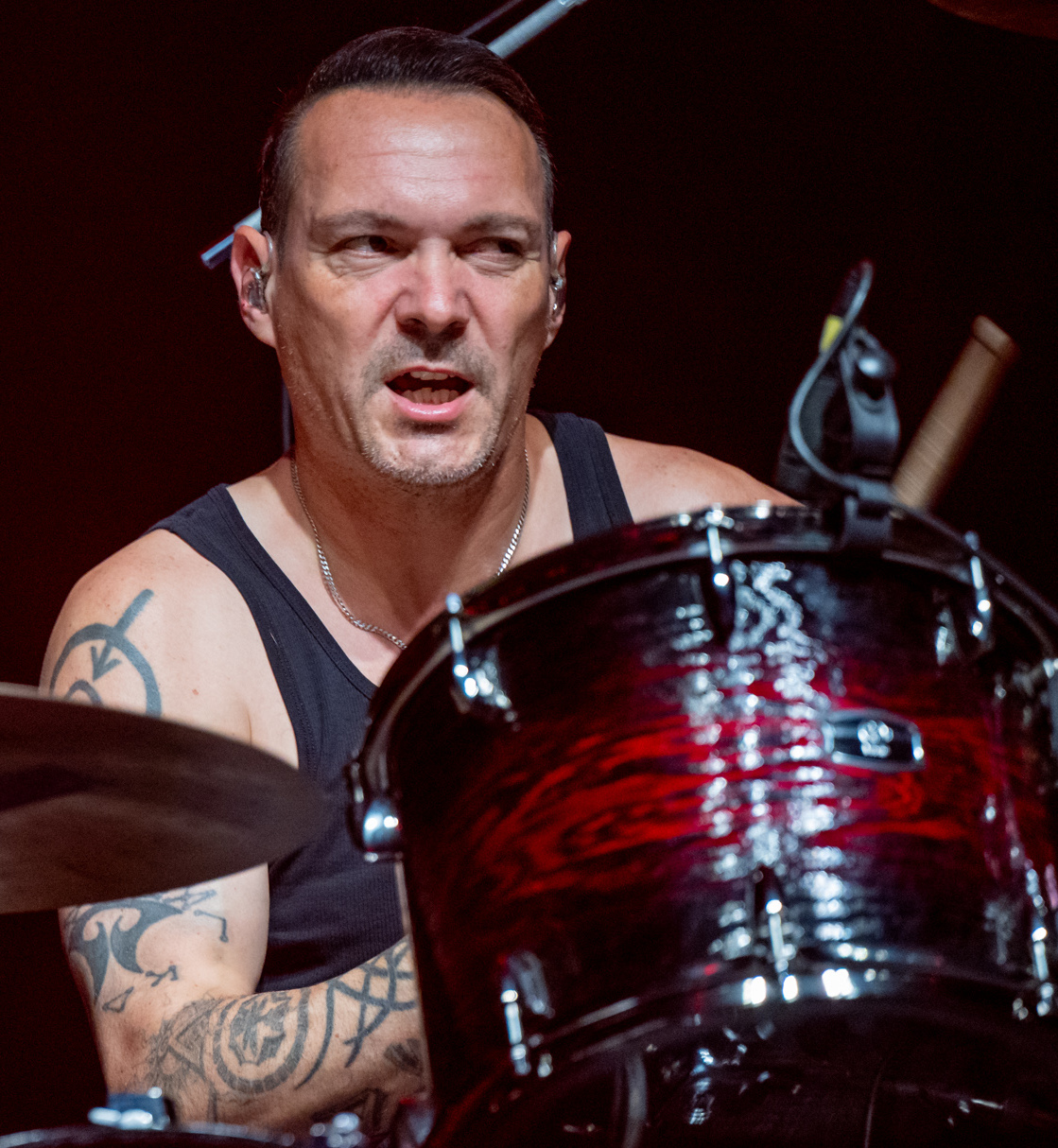
- Miller with Bad Religion in 2024

Background information
- Born: Baltimore, Maryland, U.S.
- Genres: Punk rock; alternative rock; heavy metal
- Occupation: Musician
- Instruments: Drums; guitar
- Years active: 1994–present
- Member of: Snot; theStart; Bad Religion
- Formerly of: Souls at Zero; …And You Will Know Us by the Trail of Dead; Orgy
- Spouse: Aimee Echo

Jamie Miller is an American musician, currently the drummer for rock bands Bad Religion, Vanishing Life and Snot. He is also the lead guitarist and the backing vocalist for theStart, and was formerly the drummer for Souls at Zero and the drummer and guitarist for ...And You Will Know Us By the Trail of Dead.

== Career ==
=== Souls at Zero (1994–1996) ===
Miller joined the band Souls at Zero, replacing drummer Shannon Larkin after he left to join Ugly Kid Joe in 1994. He played on Souls at Zero's final album A Taste for the Perverse.

=== Snot (1996–present) ===
Miller joined Snot in 1996. Snot signed with Geffen Records, and began work on their debut album, Get Some, released on May 27, 1997. Although the album received positive critical notice, sales were disappointing.

The band performed on the 1998 Ozzfest tour. In December 1998, band member Lynn Strait died in a car accident when a truck struck his car.

In 2008, the band reformed, with former Divine Heresy singer Tommy Vext on vocals. Tommy Cummings and Sonny Mayo left the band, and a new band, Tons, was formed in 2009 with a new vocalist. They recorded three new songs titled "Ability & Control", "1000 Ways of Pain" and "Fan the Flames" before members of the group moved on to new projects.

On February 11, 2014, Snot reunited again at the Whisky a Go Go in Hollywood.

=== theStart (1998–present) ===
Jamie Miller formed the synthrock band theStart (originally named Hero) along with Aimee Echo as the band's lead guitarist, synthesizer player and backing vocalist. They released three full-length studio albums and an EP on Geffen, Nitro and Metropolis. The band toured extensively.

=== …And You Will Know Us by the Trail of Dead (2011–2020) ===
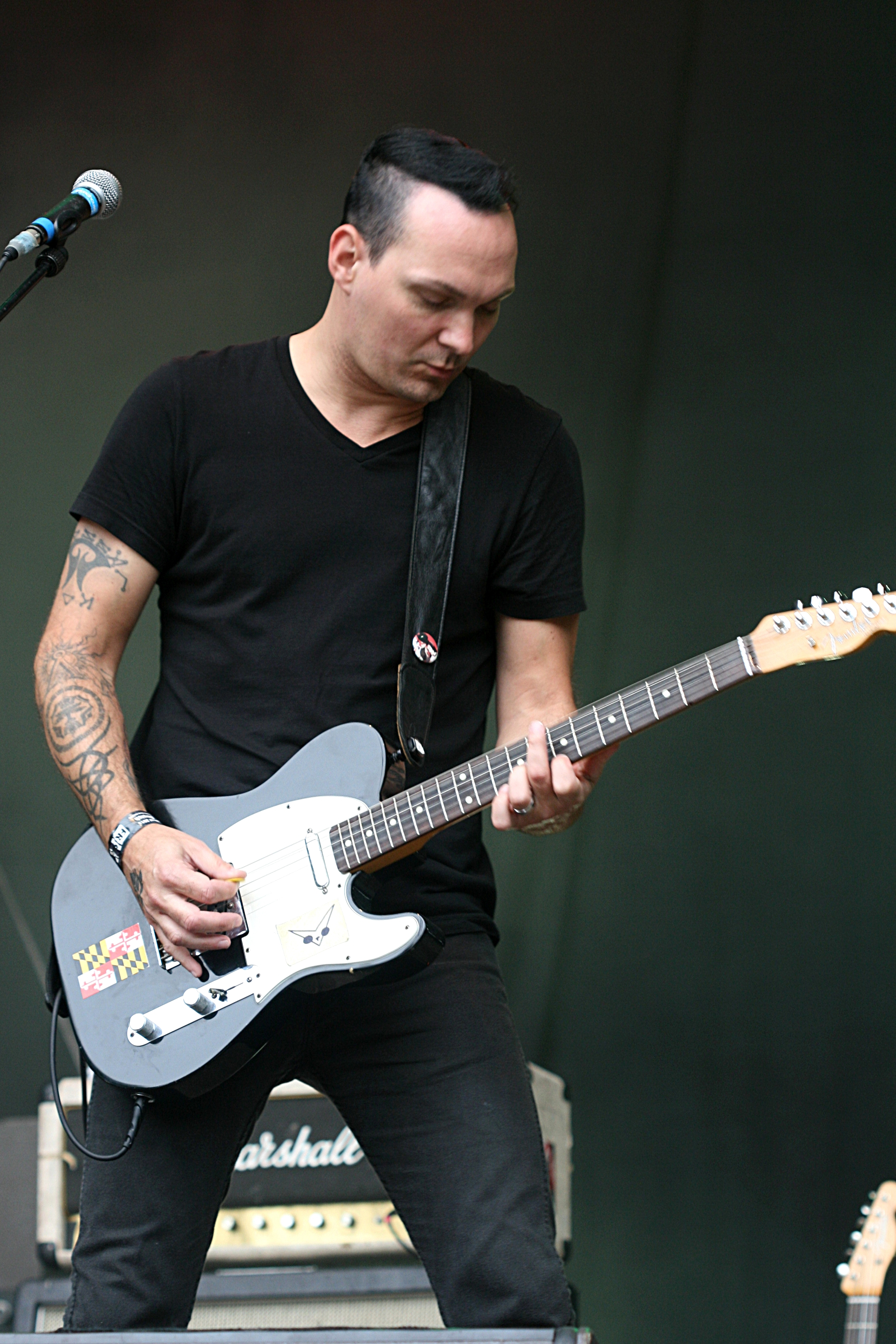
Miller with …And You Will Know Us by the Trail of Dead in 2013

Miller was a drummer and guitarist of the band ...And You Will Know Us by the Trail of Dead from 2011 to 2020. He replaced Kevin Allen.

=== Bad Religion (2015–present) ===
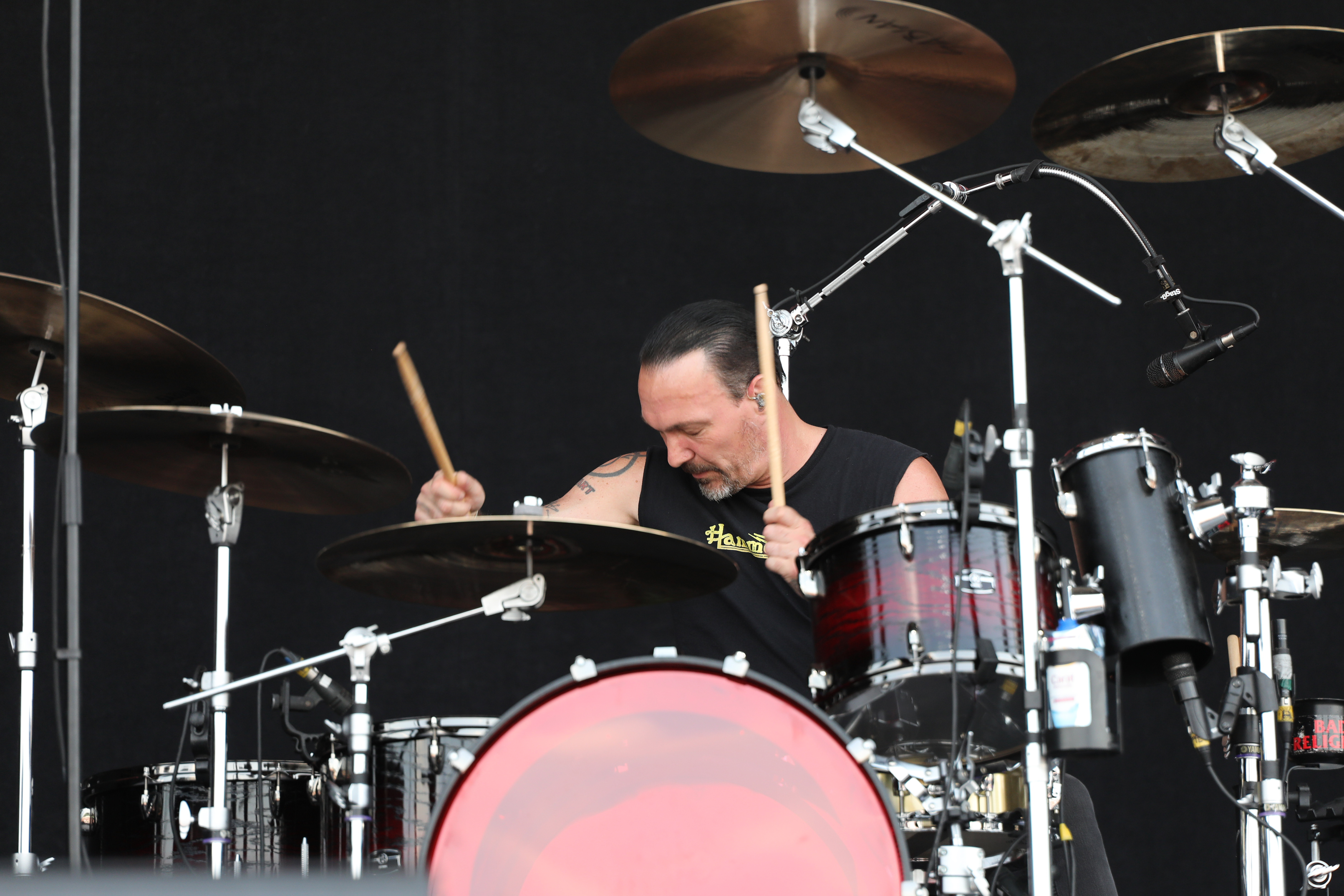
Miller with Bad Religion in 2022

In 2016, Miller became the drummer for Bad Religion by replacing longtime drummer Brooks Wackerman, who joined Avenged Sevenfold. Miller would not appear on a Bad Religion album until four years later, with Age of Unreason.

=== The Offspring (2021, 2026) ===
In September 2021, Miller performed with The Offspring filling in for friend Josh Freese due to Freese' prior commitments with Devo.

Miller filled in for the Offspring again during their SUPERCHARGED Worldwide in '26 tour while Brandon Pertzborn was on paternity leave.

== Influences ==
Miller cited Budgie of Siouxsie and the Banshees as his favourite drummer for having "a signature feel" the Banshees as his favourite band. "Whenever I hear one of their songs, I can hear his drumming and know that it's him. I love drummers like that. It's not necessarily that they have a signature sound, but rather a signature feel".

== Discography ==
=== Souls at Zero ===
- A Taste for the Perverse (1995)

=== Snot ===
- Get Some (1997)
- Strait Up (2000)
- Alive! (2002)

=== theStart ===
- Shakedown! (2001)
- The 1234 (2002)
- Death Via Satellite (2003)
- Initiation (2004)
- Ciao, Baby (2007)

=== Night Horse ===
- Perdition Hymns (2010)

=== …And You Will Know Us by the Trail of Dead ===
- Lost Songs (2012)
- IX (2014)

=== Bad Religion ===
- Age of Unreason (2019)
