= Descent to the Surface =

Descent To The Surface

Studio album by Sweethead
- Released: April 8, 2016
- Recorded: Recorded at Casa de Leones Studios, 11AD, Happy Ending Studios, Rancho De La Luna and Bedrock Studios
- Genres: Rock, alternative rock
- Label: Royal Rats
- Producer: Troy Van Leeuwen

Sweethead chronology
Sweethead (2009)	Descent To The Surface (2016)

Descent To The Surface is the second album by rock group Sweethead. It was released on April 8, 2016 and is the follow-up to their 2009 self titled debut album. For the recording of the album, band members Serrina and Troy Van Leeuwen are joined by an array of guest musicians.

== Track listing ==
All tracks are written by Serrina and Troy Van Leeuwen.

No.	Title	Length
1.	"Phantom Beat"	2:59
2.	"Turn Off My Mind"	3:28
3.	"Bull in a Turnstile"	3:07
4.	"Drink of Your Water"	3:54
5.	"Descent to the Surface"	4:11
6.	"Lazy"	3:49
7.	"Serpent"	3:40
8.	"War"	6:11
9.	"Mortal Panic"	3:37
10.	"Thousand Yard Stare"	2:44
11.	"The Bug"	4:31
12.	"Nomads"	4:13

== Personnel ==
Personnel adapted from Descent To The Surface liner notes.

=== Band ===
- Serrina Sims – vocals (1-12), war drums (8)
- Troy Van Leeuwen – guitars (1-12), keys (1, 2, 5-8, 10-12), sequencing (1, 2, 5, 11), percussion (1-6, 7, 11, 12), bass (2, 4, 5, 11, 12), backing vocals (2, 3, 5, 9), moog (3, 9), piano (4), moog lap steel (6, 8, 10), war drums (8)

=== Additional appearances ===
- Jonathan Hischke – bass (1, 3-5, 12)
- Norm Block – drums (1, 4, 5, 8, 11, 12)
- Jon Theodore – drums (2, 6, 9), shaman drum (12), cümbüş (12)
- Dean Fertita – keys (3)
- Jeff Friedl – drums (3)
- Nathan Connolly – guitars (5), backing vocals (5)
- Mike Zarin – bass (7)
- Antoine Hajjar – drums (7)
- Ben Chisolm – sequencing (7), keys (7)
- Eden Galindo – guitars (8)
- Eddie Nappi – bass (8)
- Brian O'Connor – bass (9)
- Alain Johannes – cig fiddle (12), cümbüş (12)

=== Technical personnel ===
- Troy Van Leeuwen – producer, mixing
- Sam Bell – mixing
- Alain Johannes – mastering, additional engineering
- Norm Block – additional engineering
- Dave Catching – additional engineering
- Johnny McDaid – additional engineering
- Eric Rennaker – additional engineering
- Serrina – artwork, layout
