= Joey Rubenstein =

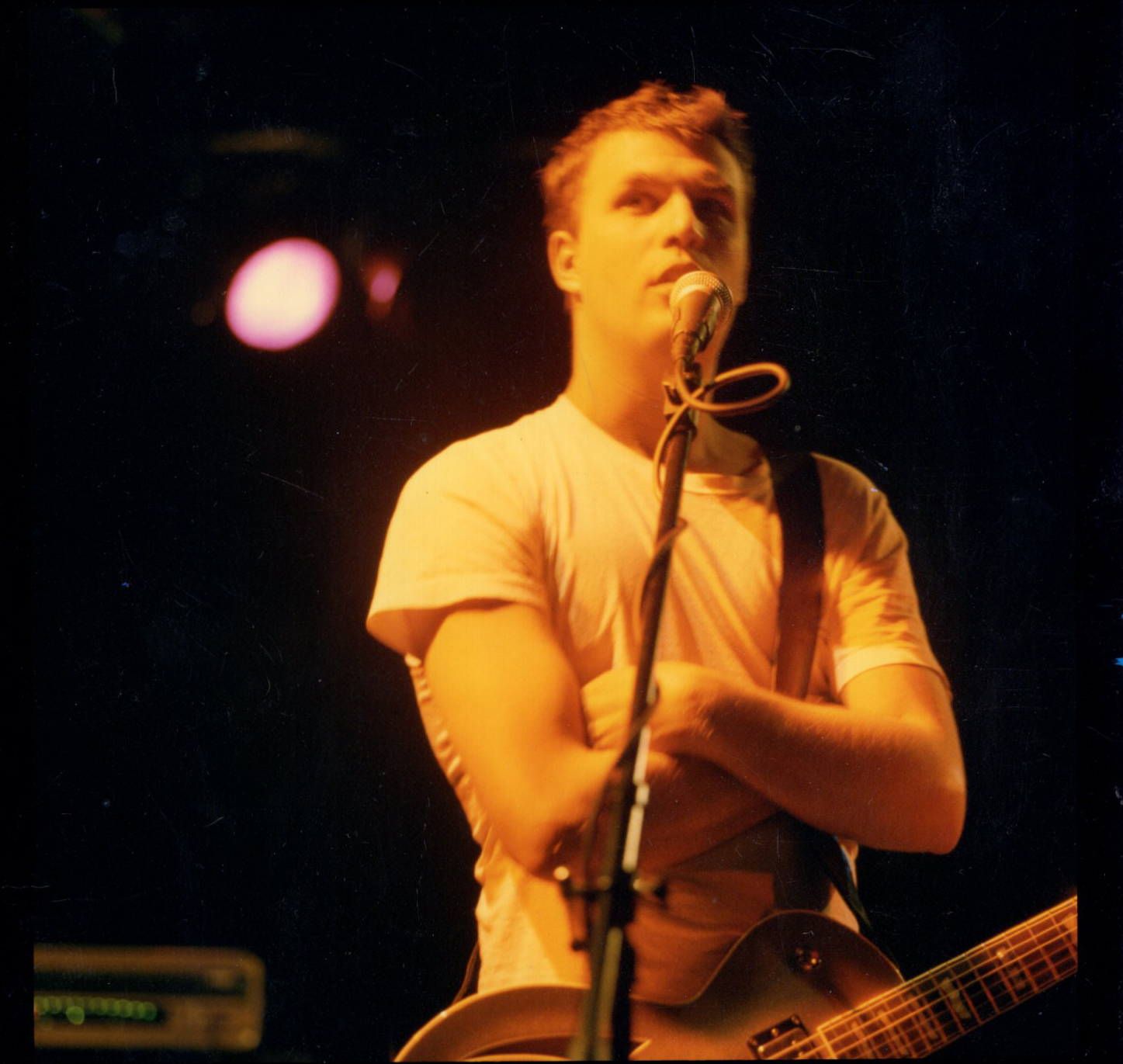
- Born: August 4, 1968 (age 58); Los Angeles, California
- Occupations: Musician, Internet entrepreneur
- Writing career
- Notable works: Casting Frontier (Website), Flourscein (Band), 60 Cycle (Band)
- Website: www.castingfrontier.com

Joey Rubenstein (born August 4, 1968) is an American internet entrepreneur, composer, touring and recording artist. He is the founder and former chief executive officer of Casting Frontier, a digital talent casting platform for the entertainment industry and was the lead guitarist in the American rock band Flourscein.

Rubenstein went to high school at Kibbutz Kabri, Western Galilee, and received a scholarship to study economics from the University of Essex in England.

== Music career ==
He formed his first professional touring and recording band, 60 Cycle, in 1993 with Troy Van Leeuwin of Queens of the Stoneage. 60 Cycle released their first single, Pretender, in 1995 a year before the release of their first self-titled record which was produced by Josh Abraham (Pink, Thirty Seconds to Mars, Kelly Clarkson). The song Strapper can be heard on the soundtrack of the 1998 film Boogie Boy starring Joan Jett and Traci Lords. After 60 Cycle, Joey's next band, Flourscein was eventually signed to David Geffen's DGC Records who re-issued their first record, "High Contrast Comedown", in January 1998. The album produced the radio single entitled, "Cathy's On Crank!". Flourscein spent years on the road touring with acts like Weezer and The Cult before Rubenstein tired of the touring lifestyle and began composing jingles for companies like Sky TV, Smarties Candee, Coke, American Express, Mattel.

== Casting Frontier ==
He developed the initial concept for Casting Frontier and its original coding software in 2007 while working as a casting professional in Los Angeles. The platform enables producers, talent and casting agents to effectively identify talent through "virtual" castings, live feeds and video submissions. The company's automation software, called iSession, is used throughout all areas of talent casting - from both talent submissions and people who solicit talent for representations and projects - in the United States and Canada and the company's database of talent is over 800,000 users. Rubenstein served as the company's C.E.O until Casting Frontier sold to Talent Systems (a subsidiary of Caltius Equity Partners) in 2020.
