= Human Waste Project =

American rock band

- Human Waste Project in 1997. From left to right: Jeff Schartoff, Mike Tempesta, Aimee Echo and Scott Ellis.

Background information
- Origin: Huntington Beach, California, U.S.
- Genres: Alternative metal; nu metal; alternative rock; gothic rock (early)
- Years active: 1993–1998; 2008–2009 (mini-reunions)
- Labels: Hollywood; Polydor (UK)
- Spinoffs: theSTART; Professional Murder Music
- Past members: Aimee Echo; Mike Tempesta; Jeff Schartoff; Scott Ellis; Michael Walsh; John Monte; Roman Marisak

Human Waste Project was an American alternative metal band from Huntington Beach, California. It was formed in December 1993 by bassist Jeff Schartoff and guitarist Roman Marisak, and after going through several shifts in personnel, the band's lineup solidified in 1994 with Schartoff, drummer Scott Ellis, vocalist Aimee Echo and guitarist Mike Tempesta.

Human Waste Project signed with Hollywood Records in June 1996, and released their debut (and only) album, E-lux, in September 1997. It received warm reviews from critics, but wasn't a commercial success. Touring and support from Kerrang! magazine helped Human Waste Project cultivate a cult following in the United Kingdom. The band also managed to make an appearance on second stage of Ozzfest UK in June 1998, after being dropped by Hollywood two months prior.

Shortly after the band's performance at Ozzfest, Aimee Echo quit Human Waste Project due to creative differences, and the band played its final show in July 1998. Between 2008 and 2009, the members of Human Waste Project had a few partial reunions, although the band never formally reformed.

== History ==
=== 1993–1998: Formation, E-lux and breakup ===
Human Waste Project was formed in December 1993 by Jeff Schartoff and Roman Marisak. However, Marisak and Schartoff lost contact, and Schartoff subsequently went about recruiting a new line-up. After recruiting drummer Scott Ellis, vocalist Aimee Echo joined the band after being asked by Ellis and Schartoff, who she was sharing a ride with to Lollapalooza, if she could scream. They initially also had another vocalist, Michael Walsh, who departed from the group in 1994, leaving Echo as the sole vocalist. John Monte joined as guitarist but did not last long and they went through a string of guitarists, one of whom was John Chase of Cellophane before finding Mike Tempesta. The group began opening for large name bands such as Sublime, Helmet, Deftones, and Korn and struck a deal with Hollywood Records on June 6, 1996. In November 1997, Human Waste Project toured the UK supporting Tura Satana. The tour was the result of a pact between Echo and Tura Satana frontwoman Tairrie B agreeing that they would both eventually tour Europe together, with whoever's band that got signed first taking the other with them as support. The band returned to the UK in December of that year with Coal Chamber. This trip awarded them press coverage that they did not find in the United States. Features with the band (particularly Aimee) were found in the European rock magazines, most notably Kerrang!. On June 20, 1998, the band played on the Kerrang! Stage at the UK Ozzfest.

Despite the band's success in the UK, the band's singer Aimee Echo was becoming disillusioned with the band due to her dislike with the band being typecast as just a heavy metal or nu metal act, as well as with E-lux's failure; this resulted in her quitting Human Waste Project following their performance at Ozzfest. As a result, Human Waste Project announced their disbandment, and they played their last official show at the House of Blues in Los Angeles on July 8, 1998, opening for Sepultura. Aimee Echo and Scott Ellis went on to form theSTART. Jeff Schartoff formed Professional Murder Music and joined Peter Murphy's live band. Mike Tempesta joined Powerman 5000.

=== 2008–2009: Reunions ===
On Aimee Echo's birthday, March 27, 2008, after a theSTART show at Crash Mansion in downtown Los Angeles, the remaining three HWP members came on stage and played "Dog" and "Shine" with her. In attendance were former members of Snot, Sevendust, Craig Riker of Deadsy, producer Ross Robinson and Chibi of The Birthday Massacre.

Human Waste Project had a publicized reunion show at the Key Club in West Hollywood on October 10, 2008, as the opening act for Snot. Three of the four original members were present (theSTART drummer Chelsea Davis filled in at the last minute for Scott Ellis). Their set list consisted of most of the songs off E-Lux and a cover of Depeche Mode's "I Feel You". Aimee stated that this would be the only full scale reunion show and the band would not be getting back together to tour.

Another mini-reunion occurred on July 9, 2009, at a theSTART show at The Roxy in West Hollywood. Mike Tempesta joined them mid-set to perform "Dog" and "One Night In Spain". The latter being a song theSTART have performed during their own shows.

On August 3, 2009, Mike Tempesta was announced on stage by Aimee Echo as being in the audience of a theSTART show in New York City at the Mercury Lounge. He joined them and performed one song.

== Discography ==
Studio albums

Year	Album details
1997	E-lux: Released: September 30, 1997; Label: Hollywood

Singles

- "Powerstrip" (UK: number 85)
