= Sweethead =

American alternative rock band

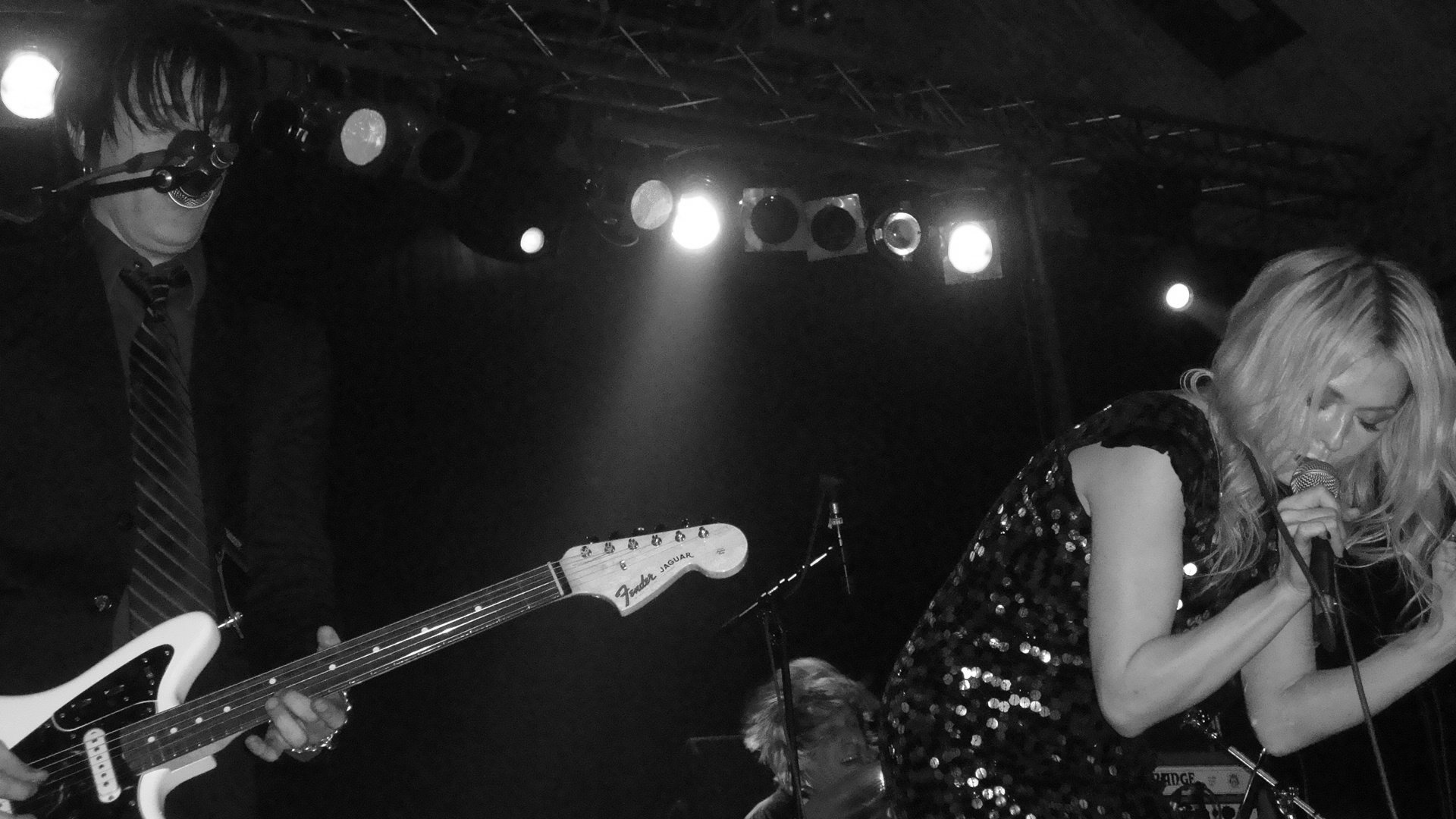
- Sweethead in 2009. Pictured: Troy Van Leeuwen (left) and Serrina Sims (right).

Background information
- Origin: United States
- Genres: Alternative rock
- Years active: 2008–present
- Label: The End
- Members: Serrina Sims; Troy Van Leeuwen; Eddie Nappi; Norm Block
- Website: sweetheadmusic.com

Sweethead is an American alternative rock band formed in 2008. The group's lineup consists of singer Serrina Sims and guitarist/multi-instrumentalist Troy Van Leeuwen (of Queens of the Stone Age, formerly of A Perfect Circle, Enemy and Failure). For recording and touring they are joined by a variety of guest musicians, many of which are current or former members of Queens of the Stone Age or Mark Lanegan Band.

Sweethead have released two studio albums—Sweethead (2009) and Descent to the Surface (2016)—and one extended play, The Great Disruptors (2009).

== History ==
=== Formation and The Great Disruptors (2008–2009) ===
Having played with Eddie Nappi (formerly of Handsome) and Norm Block (formerly of Plexi) in the Mark Lanegan Band (Nappi was also part of his previous group Enemy) while also writing material with singer Serrina Sims over the years, Queens of the Stone Age guitarist Troy Van Leeuwen formed Sweethead in 2008. The group's name was taken from the David Bowie song "Sweet Head" with Van Leeuwen stating that "I think band names are becoming sillier and sillier. That song just seemed to encapsulate what we thought of ourselves." The band, in 2009, toured as part of Snow Patrol's Taking Back the Cities Tour playing in Sweden, Denmark, Germany, Austria, Switzerland and France from May 18 through to June 2. Commenting on how the group came to tour with Snow Patrol:

'We gave Nathan Connolly a copy of our record and they loved it. I just mentioned to them. Well, if you guys ever need an opening band. They just happened to it "Come on the road!"'

They recorded their debut EP, titled The Great Disruptors, at Van Leeuwen's home studio and eventually released it on July 13, 2009. Van Leeuwen stated that the EP included the first songs recorded by the band with a cover of The Kinks' "Tired of Waiting for You" added, describing it as "a single with four B-sides." In August, the group released the video to the title track from the EP before going on to play a show at the London Barfly followed by appearances at both the Reading and Leeds Festivals. In late October and early November, the group supported Eagles of Death Metal for a number of shows on their UK tour.

=== Self-titled debut album (2009–2015) ===
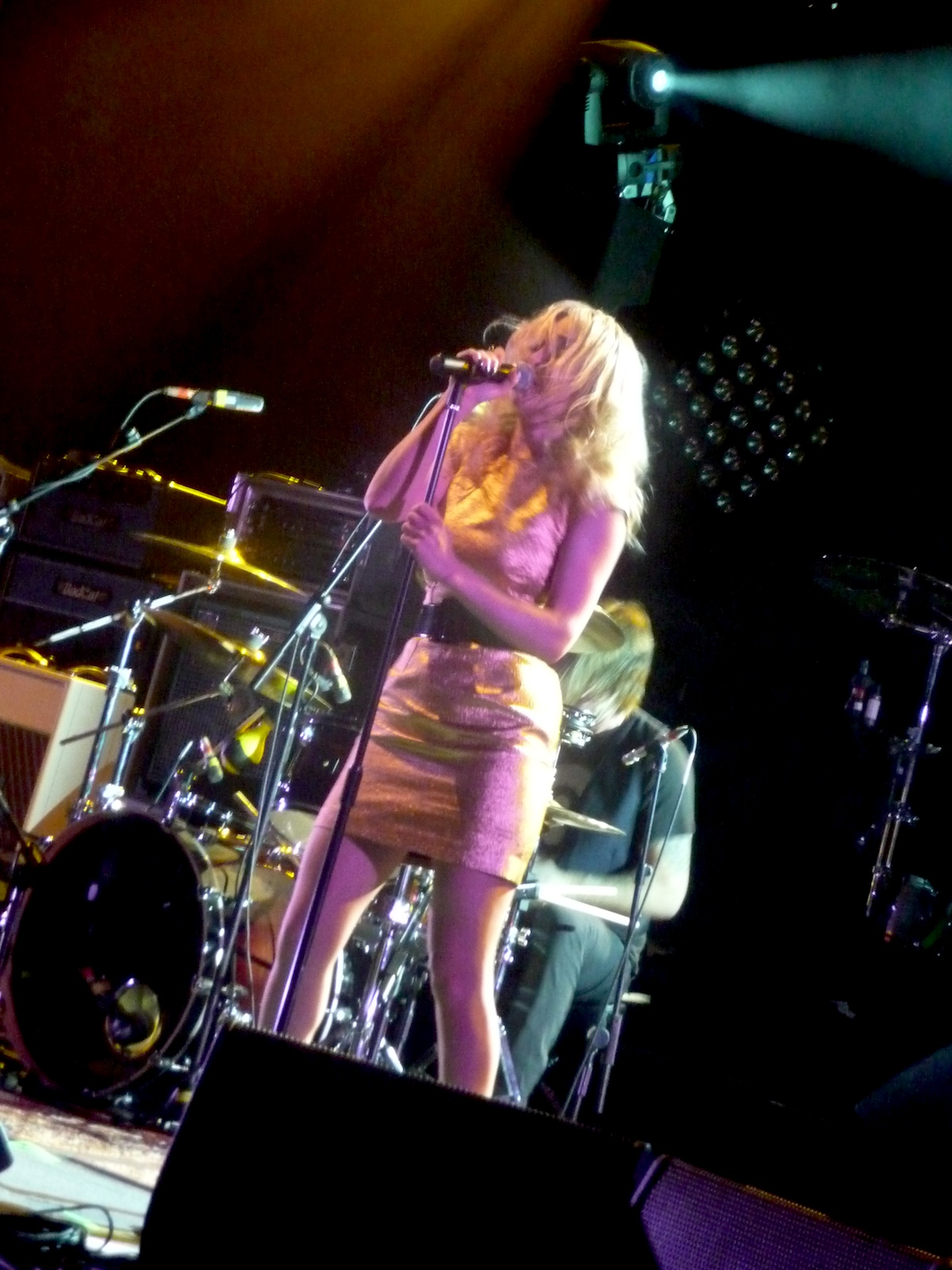
Sweethead supporting Them Crooked Vultures at the Hammersmith Apollo in 2009

With new material recorded, the group released Sweethead on November 2, 2009. The album was produced by Van Leeuwen with recording and engineering by Van Leeuwen, Block and Billy Howerdel (of A Perfect Circle and Ashes Divide) among others. The album was also mastered by Alain Johannes The group went on to tour as the main support for the German/UK leg of the Deserve the Future Tour with Them Crooked Vultures. In a November interview, Van Leeuwen hinted that should his commitments with Queens of the Stone Age clash with Sweethead, he would allow the group to continue with him switching to a writing and recording capacity until he could return:

'I think I'll always be involved in Sweethead, and I'll do my best to be involved as much as I can. But like I said, if things get too crazy with Queens Of The Stone Age, which they tend to do, it's totally understood that the idea should continue on, even if I move on to just doing the recording and the writing, and maybe not so much touring. It's really early to say. I love the band, and it's partly my baby, so I want to make sure that it's treated right.'

Serrina Sims stated in an interview that the group may record a new album in the first part of the new year, before the US release of the debut album in March 2010, and when Queens of the Stone Age release a new album and tour, Sweethead will reconvene and continue.

On April 5, 2010, the group announced a string of dates in Europe, including the Rock im Park Festival, as well as the UK, including the Download Festival. In June of the same year, they announced a handful of dates touring in the western US.

=== Descent to the Surface (2016–present) ===
On April 8, 2016, the band released their second studio album, Descent to the Surface.

== Members ==
- Serrina Sims – vocals
- Troy Van Leeuwen – guitar, backing vocals, various instruments

== Discography ==
Studio albums

- Sweethead (2009)
- Descent to the Surface (2016)

EPs

- The Great Disruptors (2009)
- Reverse Exorcism! (2013)
- Mortal Panic (2015)
