= Carrolls, Washington =

Unincorporated community in Washington, United States

- Unincorporated community
- Location in the state of Washington Carrolls (the United States)
- Coordinates: 46°04′17″N 122°51′44″W
- Country: United States
- State: Washington
- County: Cowlitz
- Elevation: 69 ft (21 m)
- Time zone: UTC−8 (PST)
  - Summer (DST): UTC−7 (PDT)
- ZIP Code: 98626 or 98609 (Carrolls has its own Post Office)
- Area code(s): 360, 564
- FIPS code: 53-10285
- GNIS feature ID: 1512067

Carrolls is an unincorporated community in Cowlitz County, Washington, south of the city of Kelso. Carrolls is located south on Old Pacific Highway from exit 36 of Interstate 5. The Carrolls community is part of the Kelso School District, a K-12 school district of nearly 5,000 students.

The community derives its name from Major Carroll, a pioneer resident.
