= Troy Van Leeuwen =

American rock musician and record producer (born 1968)

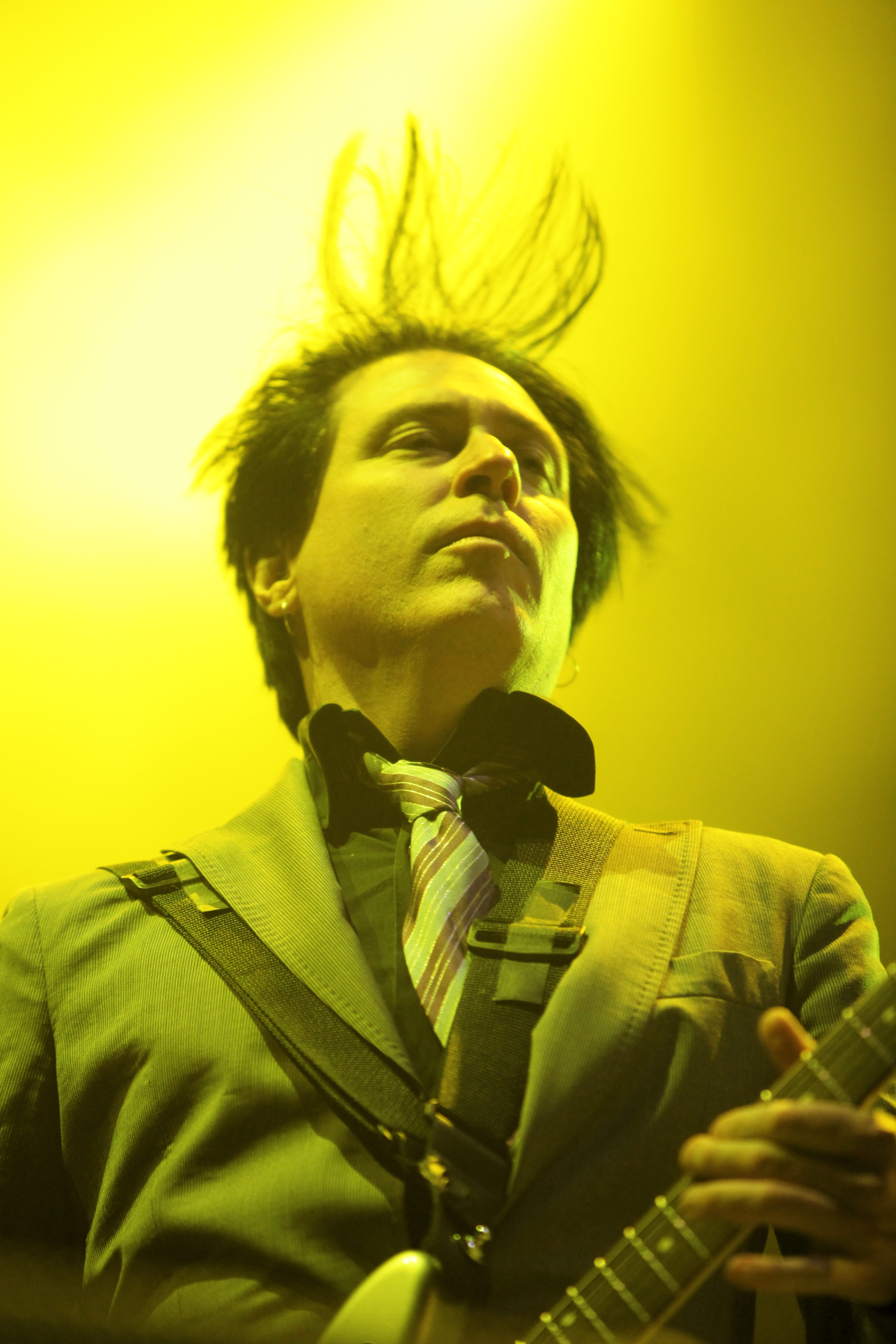
- Van Leeuwen performing in 2011

Background information
- Also known as: T.V. Leeuwen; Troy De Van Leeuwen; TVL; Tweezil Von Smoothy; Twizzy
- Born: Troy Dean Van Leeuwen; January 5, 1968 (age 58); Los Angeles, California, U.S.
- Genres: Rock; alternative rock; hard rock
- Occupations: Musician; songwriter; producer
- Instruments: Guitar; keyboards; synthesizers; percussion; bass; vocals
- Years active: 1983–present
- Labels: Warner Bros.; EMI; Virgin; LMC; MCA; Interscope; The Control Group; Matador; Beggars Banquet
- Member of: Queens of the Stone Age; Gone Is Gone; Sweethead
- Formerly of: Jester; Little Boots; 60 Cycle; Failure; A Perfect Circle; The Wondergirls; Enemy; Revenge of the Triads; Eagles of Death Metal; Mondo Generator

Troy Dean Van Leeuwen (Dutch pronunciation: [vɑn ˈleːu̯ə(n)]; born January 5, 1968) is an American musician and record producer. He is best known as a guitarist and multi-instrumentalist in the rock band Queens of the Stone Age, with whom he has recorded six studio albums. Having joined the band in 2002, he is the second-longest-serving member of the band, after founding member Josh Homme. Van Leeuwen is also a member of the supergroup Gone Is Gone and has fronted his own projects, Enemy and Sweethead.

Originally a member of Failure, Van Leeuwen joined the alternative rock supergroup A Perfect Circle in 1999, contributing to their first two studio albums, Mer de Noms (2000) and Thirteenth Step (2003), before joining Queens of the Stone Age to tour in support of their third studio album, Songs for the Deaf (2002). Van Leeuwen has remained in the band ever since, recording six albums with the band to date: Lullabies to Paralyze (2005), Era Vulgaris (2007), ...Like Clockwork (2013), Villains (2017), In Times New Roman... (2023) and Perfecth (2026).

Van Leeuwen has contributed to several other Queens of the Stone Age-related side-projects, including The Desert Sessions, Mondo Generator, Eagles of Death Metal and The Gutter Twins. In addition to his primary projects, Van Leeuwen has also been a touring member of The Damned, Jane's Addiction and Iggy Pop's band.

== Career ==
Van Leeuwen began playing in the late 1980s with Jester, a southern California band fronted by vocalist Eric Book. Jester released an EP, which contains the earliest recording of a 16-year-old Van Leeuwen. He then played in another local band called Little Boots, with which he recorded a number of demos and played a dozen shows before the band broke up. His next band was 60 Cycle, which released their debut "Pretender" in 1995 and their self-titled album the following year. During his time in 60 Cycle, Van Leeuwen met Kellii Scott, and the two began working on a project together (later known as Enemy). Van Leeuwen went on to tour with Failure in support of their third album, Fantastic Planet. The band released three records in the early to late 90s and didn't enjoy much commercial success, but they were praised by critics as a talented and almost revolutionary group (they later re-formed in 2014 without Troy). It was during a tour with Failure when Van Leeuwen met former Kyuss guitarist Josh Homme, who was then playing rhythm guitar with The Screaming Trees. After the late-90s hiatus of Failure, Van Leeuwen became a session musician and recording engineer, working with groups such as Orgy, Crazy Town, Coal Chamber and Korn.

=== A Perfect Circle ===
It was during his time as a session musician that Van Leeuwen met Tool frontman Maynard James Keenan, who offered him a spot in his and Billy Howerdel's new band, A Perfect Circle. The band played their first show at LA's Viper Club Reception on August 15, 1999. After playing shows in Los Angeles, the band entered the studio to begin work on their debut album, Mer de Noms. The album was released on May 23, 2000, making it the highest ever debut for a new rock band, selling over 188,000 copies in its first week, and appearing at number four on the Billboard 200. Van Leeuwen toured extensively with the band, initially as the opening act for Nine Inch Nails, followed a number of headlining tours around the world. Van Leeuwen recorded guitar parts on only three tracks of A Perfect Circle's second album, Thirteenth Step, before successfully auditioning for a spot in Josh Homme's Queens of the Stone Age.

=== Queens of the Stone Age ===
After outperforming Jeordie White and others in the audition, Van Leeuwen was welcomed as the band's second guitarist for their Songs for the Deaf tour. Besides playing guitar, Van Leeuwen also performed on lap steel guitar, keyboards, backing vocals and occasionally bass guitar. Due to the band's schedule, Van Leeuwen had only one week to learn 30 songs before the tour began. For the European leg of the album's supporting tour, Dave Grohl left to return to his main band Foo Fighters. He was replaced with former Danzig drummer Joey Castillo. Songs for the Deaf was a critical and commercial success, and the singles "No One Knows" and "Go with the Flow" became hits on both radio and MTV. The tour culminated in a number of headline dates in Australia in January 2004.

Van Leeuwen's first recording with QOTSA was Lullabies to Paralyze. The band entered the studio with long-time collaborator and multi-instrumentalist Alain Johannes, who replaced Nick Oliveri on the album. Van Leeuwen aimed to fill in some of the gaps in the music where he felt the sound could be expanded through atmospheric and ambient textures made by guitar, lap steel and piano. The album (the title of which is taken from a lyric in Mosquito Song from Songs for the Deaf) featured several guest appearances, most notably ZZ Top's Billy Gibbons, who performed backing vocals and lead guitar on "Burn the Witch" and the ZZ Top cover, "Precious and Grace". Despite reportedly turning down an invitation to remain with the band, Mark Lanegan recorded vocals on new tracks, and appeared with the band on the supporting tour when scheduling and his health permitted. The album was leaked onto the internet in February 2005, and was aired by Australian radio on March 3, 2005, as an unsubstantiated 'World Premiere'. The album was then officially released on March 22, 2005, in the US, and debuted as number 5 on the Billboard Music Chart: the greatest initial success of any QOTSA record to date. On November 22, 2005, the band released a live album/DVD set called Over the Years and Through the Woods, which featured a live concert filmed in London, and bonus features (including rare videos dating from 1998 to 2005).

After touring to support the album, the band headed back into the studio in July 2006. A year later, Van Leeuwen reported that the band had written new material that was "still in its infancy", which Homme later suggested might be released as an EP. This matured into their 2007 release Era Vulgaris, to which Van Leeuwen contributed a significant amount of material.

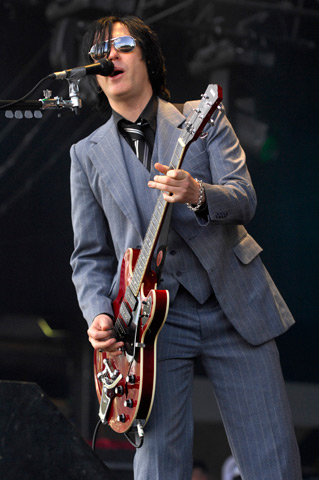
Van Leeuwen performing with Queens of the Stone Age in 2007

Several sites reported that the album would include many guest vocalists, including Trent Reznor from Nine Inch Nails, Julian Casablancas from The Strokes, Mark Lanegan, Billy Gibbons of ZZ Top, and wittingly, deceased humorist Erma Bombeck. Josh Homme described the record as "dark, hard, and electrical, sort of like a construction worker". Era Vulgaris was completed in early April 2007 and released in June 2007 in the US The tracks "Sick, Sick, Sick" and "3's & 7's" were released as singles in early June. Bassist Michael Shuman (Wires on Fire, Jubilee) and keyboardist Dean Fertita (The Waxwings, The Raconteurs) took over touring duties from Alain Johannes and Natasha Shneider respectively.

Following a subsequent interview with Homme, The Globe and Mail reported that the EP "could contain as many as 10 B-sides recorded during the Era Vulgaris sessions." It was since reported however that the EP would not be released due to the record label's unwillingness to put out another QOTSA release at this time. In a September issue of NME Magazine, Homme stated that he was going back to make the new QOTSA and Desert Sessions records, along with remastering the 1998 QOTSA self-titled album for an early 2009 release. Homme also stated Queens' new album is going to be a "desert orgy in the dark".

In 2013, QOTSA released ...Like Clockwork, Van Leeuwen's third full album with the band. On the album, Van Leeuwen plays guitar, percussion, twelve-string guitar, twelve-string slide guitar, lap steel, synthesizers, acoustic guitar and provides vocals. The album was the first QOTSA album to reach number one on the Billboard 200. It also reached number two on the UK Albums Chart and was nominated for three Grammy Awards, including Best Rock Album.

=== Other musical work ===
In 2001, Van Leeuwen joined the supergroup Revenge of the Triads with Nine Inch Nails keyboardist Charlie Clouser and Snake River Conspiracy bassist/producer Jason Slater. Van Leeuwen, who acted the band's main vocalist, described the band as a mixture of all three of the members influences, and stated that the band did not fit in any specific genre. The band was signed to LMC Records, an independent label distributed by MCA Records, and worked on a debut album before breaking up almost exactly a year later due to problems with LMC not paying the band and the members' losing interest in the project. The album remains unfinished and unreleased.

In 2005, Van Leeuwen released Hooray For Dark Matter with his side project Enemy. The album features bassist Eddie Nappi from the Mark Lanegan Band, and his former bandmate from Failure Kellii Scott on drums (who had replaced Quicksand's Alan Cage). Van Leeuwen describes Enemy as his "big, dumb rock trio", and "a vehicle driven by pure and utter disgust of mediocrity and general frustration with the human condition". During Van Leeuwen's time with A Perfect Circle, Enemy recorded a five track demo in what he called "guerilla-style recording" at various studios. The band unusually offered to be signed by a record label by advertising for the princely sum of $250,000 on eBay. Enemy was ultimately signed by Control Group/TCG, who released their debut album. After joining the Queens of the Stone Age, Van Leeuwen has also contributed music to band members' various side projects, such as The Desert Sessions, Mondo Generator, Eagles of Death Metal, The Gutter Twins, Mark Lanegan's solo album Bubblegum, and David Catching's album Shared Hallucinations. After the Era Vulgaris tour's end, Van Leeuwen began touring with his current side project, Sweethead.

In 2016, Van Leeuwen toured with Iggy Pop, Josh Homme, Matt Helders and Matt Sweeney in support of their album Post Pop Depression. He also formed Gone Is Gone, a supergroup also consisting of Mastodon singer and bass player Troy Sanders, At the Drive-In drummer Tony Hajjar, and multi-instrumentalist Mike Zarin. In 2017, he contributed guitar parts to Chelsea Wolfe's fifth studio album, Hiss Spun. He played on the Detroit hardcore collective The Armed's 2021 album Ultrapop and on their 2023 album Perfect Saviors.

In 2022, Van Leeuwen took on touring guitarist duties for The Damned on the US dates of their tour, temporarily replacing Captain Sensible. Later that year, he served as the touring guitarist for alternative rock band Jane's Addiction while longtime member Dave Navarro was ill with long COVID.

== Artistic influences ==
During Van Leeuwen's childhood, his father often played early rock and roll records for his son, including Chuck Berry. Van Leeuwen was inspired to learn how to play rock music himself after listening to Led Zeppelin records. Playing drums initially, Van Leeuwen sought to imitate Zeppelin's drummer, John Bonham, but later switched to guitar. In a 2005 interview, he cited Jimmy Page as a significant influence:

"Jimmy Page was the first influence I had as a guitar player. There were so many textures and different sounds that he got. The riffs that he made were undeniably great. Every one of them. Even the mistakes he made were great. So to me, that was a great first influence."

== Musical equipment ==
According to Van Leeuwen, Queens of the Stone Age (and Homme in particular) have a "veil of secrecy" regarding their exact setup, in order to maintain a unique guitar sound. However, over time Van Leeuwen eventually disclosed some information regarding his gear. When he first joined the band in 2002 for the Songs for the Deaf promotional tour, he leaned toward duplicating Josh Homme's setup, favoring Ampeg guitar combos and specific pedals. All of his guitars were fitted with a variety of Seymour Duncan pickups, most often Customs or JB. During the Lullabies to Paralyze period, both Homme and Van Leeuwen favored semi-hollow guitars with P-90 pickups due to their natural resonance. To avoid "bad feedback", he stuffed pieces of foam into the F-holes of some. On Era Vulgaris he switched to Fender Telecasters and Jaguars, recorded through small, cheap amps. His guitars are tuned in standard 440, mostly E, and C, though one-off tunings have appeared on a few songs. He is a steady user of Mastery bridges, utilizing their Offset and Tele models in addition to the Offset vibrato. Van Leeuwen has also said that his live rig is considerably different than what he uses during recording, due to considering most of his vintage equipment too unreliable for touring. He uses custom gauge Dunlop 11's for standard tuning and 12's for lower tunings. Van Leeuwen uses Silver Hercos .75mm picks, the same picks Jimmy Page uses, and got a signature version of them in early 2017.

=== Other instruments ===
In addition to guitar and lap steel, Van Leeuwen has also played a Clavia Nord Electro keyboard and later a Moog Little Phattie synthesizer during live performances and recordings. After Nick Oliveri's departure from the band, Van Leeuwen also played an Epiphone Rivoli bass and a custom Yamaha SA bass during several Queens of the Stone Age recordings and the Lullabies to Paralyze tour, sharing bass playing duties with Alain Johannes, as well as using a blue 1967 Mosrite Ventures bass in the "Little Sister" video. Following bassist Michael Shuman and keyboardist/guitarist Dean Fertita being hired during the production of Era Vulgaris, Van Leeuwen went back to primarily playing lead guitar live, although he still occasionally plays synths, lap steel, and backing vocals.

== Selected discography ==
Van Leeuwen has appeared on a wide range of albums from various bands and performers from many genres.

Year	Band or artist	Song or album	Credits
1986	Jester	Jester	Guitar
1995	60 Cycle	Pretender	Guitar
1996	60 Cycle	60 Cycle	Guitar
1998	Korn	Freak on a Leash	Engineer
1998	Orgy	Candyass	Guitar
1999	Coal Chamber	Chamber Music	Keyboards, technical assistant
1999	Crazy Town	The Gift of Game	Additional guitar, programming assistant
1999	Deadsy	Commencement	Guitar
2000	Professional Murder Music	Professional Murder Music	Guitar
2000	A Perfect Circle	Mer de Noms	Guitar
2000	Orgy	Vapor Transmission	Guitar
2003	UNKLE	Never, Never, Land	Guitar
2003	A Perfect Circle	Thirteenth Step	Guitar
2003	Slaves on Dope	Metafour	Production
2003	Mondo Generator	A Drug Problem That Never Existed	Additional performer
2003	The Desert Sessions	Vol 9: I See You Hearin' Me	Guitar, lap steel, bass
2003	The Desert Sessions	Vol 10: I Heart Disco	Guitar, lap steel, bass
2004	Failure	Golden	Guitar
2004	A Perfect Circle	aMotion	Guitar
2004	Orgy	Punk Statik Paranoia	Guitar
2005	Queens of the Stone Age	Lullabies to Paralyze	Guitar, bass, lap steel, piano, keyboards, handclaps, vocals
2005	Queens of the Stone Age	Over The Years And Through The Woods	Guitar, lap steel, bass, vocals
2005	Mark Lanegan Band	Bubblegum	Guitar, piano
2005	Enemy	Hooray For Dark Matter	Vocals, guitar, mixing, production
2006	Failure	Essentials	Guitar
2006	J-AX	Di Sana Pianta	Chitarrone
2006	Eagles of Death Metal	Death by Sexy	Performer, piano, backing vocals
2007	Queens of the Stone Age	Era Vulgaris	Guitar, bass, lap steel, piano, keyboard, vocals
2008	Eagles of Death Metal	Heart On	Vocals
2008	The Gutter Twins	Saturnalia	Guitar
2009	Sweethead	The Great Disruptors	Guitar, bass, backing vocals, production, mixing
2009	Sweethead	Sweethead	Guitar, bass, backing vocals, production, mixing
2009	Hello=Fire	Hello=Fire	Bass
2012	Robbie Williams	Take The Crown	Lead guitar
2013	Queens of the Stone Age	Like Clockwork	Guitar, backing vocals, percussion, keyboard, lap steel
2015	Failure	The Heart Is a Monster	Additional Guitar
2016	Gone Is Gone	Gone Is Gone	Guitar
2016	Sweethead	Descent to the Surface	Guitar, bass, backing vocals, production, mixing
2016	Iggy Pop	Post Pop Depression – Live at the Royal Albert Hall	Guitar
2017	Chelsea Wolfe	Hiss Spun	Guitar
2017	Gone Is Gone	Echolocation	Guitar
2017	Queens of the Stone Age	Villains	Guitar
2020	Gone Is Gone	If Everything Happens for a Reason... Then Nothing Really Matters at All	Guitar
2023	Queens of the Stone Age	In Times New Roman...	Guitar
2026	Queens of the Stone Age	Perfecth	Guitar

Preceded by Brendon McNichol	Multi-instrumentalist for Queens of the Stone Age; 2002–present	Succeeded by Incumbent
Preceded by no one	Rhythm guitarist for A Perfect Circle; 1999–2003	Succeeded by Danny Lohner
