= Lynn Strait =

American nu metal singer (1968–1998)

- Strait with his dog, Dobbs

Background information
- Born: James Lynn Strait II; August 7, 1968; Manhasset, New York, U.S.
- Died: December 11, 1998 (aged 30) US 101, Santa Barbara, California, U.S.
- Genres: Nu metal; funk metal; hardcore punk
- Occupations: Singer; songwriter
- Years active: 1988–1998
- Formerly of: Snot; Lethal Dose

James Lynn Strait II (August 7, 1968 – December 11, 1998) was an American singer. He was the lead vocalist and lyricist for the nu metal band Snot.

== Biography ==
Strait was born on August 7, 1968, in Manhasset, New York. His father was in the US Armed Forces, and the Strait family moved around the country throughout the late 1960s and early 1970s, before deciding to settle down in Santa Barbara, California, when Lynn was 10 years old. Although he was not diagnosed with it until he was an adult, Strait had Tourette's syndrome.

As a teenager, Strait embraced the 'SoCal' punk scene. Prior to his work with Snot, Strait had played bass in Goleta-based thrash metal band Lethal Dose, but he had never sung in a band. "I always wanted to because it seemed like a lot of fun. But I wasn't into what most bands were playing." Starting from scratch was an advantage for Strait: "There's nobody to emulate. I won't say what I do is groundbreaking, but some of it is original; there are weird patterns in my vocals, because I got to make up my style as I went along."

Strait was friends with Tairrie B, and Snot played their first show in 1995 opening for Manhole (later known as Tura Satana). He later appeared as a guest vocalist on Manhole's debut album All Is Not Well (1996), performing a duet with Tairrie B on the song "Down." Landing a recording contract was a dream come true for some of his friends, but Strait was apparently not impressed by the development. His response: "Now I can order cheese on my Whopper." While his bandmates were signing the contracts, Strait was completing a month-long sentence in the county jail, where he had spent a year in the early 1990s.

== Death and legacy ==
On December 11, 1998, Strait was traveling from Santa Barbara, California, to Los Angeles and was killed in a six-car crash. The crash occurred on a highway off-ramp. Only one other driver, David Redderson, was injured in the crash, and he was released from Saint Francis Hospital in Santa Barbara. Also killed in the accident was Strait's dog, Dobbs, who was on the cover of the band's 1997 debut album Get Some and served as the group's mascot.

The band Sevendust paid tribute to Strait with the song "Angel's Son." A tribute album entitled Strait Up was released on November 7, 2000, on Virgin Records/Immortal Records, compiled with the help of members of Limp Bizkit, Korn, Slipknot, Sevendust, Hed PE, Coal Chamber, Sugar Ray, System of a Down, Soulfly, Incubus, Ozzy Osbourne, and others. The album contains tributes to Strait with backing from the remaining band. Also on the record was a remixed version of Strait's last recording with Snot, a song titled "Absent," the original version of which was included on the Strangeland soundtrack.

On August 7, 1999, fans were encouraged to buy copies of Snot's debut CD Get Some in an attempt to cause a jump in the charts on what would have been Strait's 31st birthday. The band My Ruin fronted by Tairrie B paid tribute to him with a song called "Rockstar." The band NOFX mentions Strait and Dobbs in their song "Doornails," in which they pay tribute to deceased punk band members. Strait had previously provided backing vocals on their song "The Brews." Punk Rock band Lagwagon would pay tribute to Lynn with the song “Narrow Straits” in 1999 as the members of the band were all from Goleta and were friends with him. British band Reuben paid tribute to him and Kurt Cobain in their song "Push." The Italian rap rock band Folder also mentions Lynn in their 2005 album Right Things in the song "Precious".
