= Professional Murder Music =

American metal band

- Origin: Los Angeles, California, U.S.
- Genres: Nu metal, industrial metal
- Years active: 1998–present
- Labels: Wormhole; Flip; Geffen; Underground, Inc.
- Spinoff of: Human Waste Project
- Members: Roman Marisak; Tom Hatziemanouel; Jeff Schartoff
- Past members: Justin Bennett; Josh Memolo; Chris Olivas; Brian Harrah
- Website: murdermusic.com

Professional Murder Music (PMM) is an American industrial metal band from Los Angeles, California. The band was formed by bassist/keyboardist Jeff Schartoff and guitarist/vocalist Roman Marisak in 1998, just prior to the disbandment of their previous band, Human Waste Project. They currently operate their own indie label, Wormhole Records.

Their music has been used in film soundtracks including End of Days, Ginger Snaps, Valentine, and the video game Jet Set Radio for the Sega Dreamcast. Their work has also appeared on MTV's The Real World. The band participated in the Tattoo the Earth tour and shared the stage with acts including Fear Factory, Rammstein, Staind, Cold, and Powerman 5000. Since 2001, they have released three full-length albums, and a new single entitled "The Reflection" in 2013.

== History ==
Jeff Schartoff and Roman Marisak were members of the alternative metal band Human Waste Project, with Schartoff playing bass and Marisak acting as the band's occasional second guitarist.

Originally conceived as a side project, Professional Murder Music took its name from a term Schartoff used to describe Human Waste Project's sound. Following the disbandment of Human Waste Project in July 1998, Professional Murder Music became the primary focus for both members.

The band self-released a six-song EP in November 1998 and toured as an opening act for Spineshank and Fear Factory, attracting the attention of major record labels. On September 9, 1999, Professional Murder Music announced they had signed to Geffen Records.

Following their departure from Geffen Records, the band formed Wormhole Records to independently release Looking Through, with national distribution through Underground, Inc./Caroline.

== Major-label period (2001–2005) ==
The band worked with producer Josh Abraham on its debut album, with guest contributions from Dave Ogilvie and Troy Van Leeuwen.

== Lineup changes ==
During the recording of Looking Through, guitarist Brian Harrah and drummer Justin Bennett departed, with Tom Hatziemanouel and later Chris Olivas joining the lineup.

== Media appearances ==
The single “Slow” received rotation on MTV networks and was used in promotional segments.

== Discography ==
=== Studio albums ===
- Professional Murder Music (2001)
- Looking Through (2003)
- De Profundis (2005)

=== Singles ===
- The Reflection (2013)
- All Comes Down (2021)
- Everending (feat. Charlie Kennedy) (2021)
- Please (2022)

== Members ==
- Roman Marisak – vocals, guitars, programming (1999–present)
- Jeff Schartoff – bass, programming (1999–present)
- Tom Hatziemanouel – guitars (2003–present)

=== Former members ===
- Justin Bennett – drums, programming (1999–2004)
- Josh Memolo – drums (2004–2008)
- Chris Olivas – drums (2008–2011)
- Brian Harrah – guitars (1999–2003, 2008)
