= Professional Murder Music (album) =

Studio album by Professional Murder Music
- Released: May 22, 2001
- Studio: NRG Recording, North Hollywood; Plan-A Studios, Los Angeles; Westlake Audio, Los Angeles
- Genre: Industrial metal; nu metal
- Length: 47:22
- Label: Geffen
- Producer: Josh Abraham

Professional Murder Music chronology
Professional Murder Music (2001)	Looking Through (2003)

Professional ratings
Review scores
Source	Rating
AllMusic	3/5 stars

Professional Murder Music is the first studio album by American metal band Professional Murder Music, released on May 22, 2001, through Geffen Records. Reviewers particularly favored their cover of "A Night Like This".

== Track listing ==
1. "Slow" – 3:58
2. "Fall Again" – 3:55
3. "Of Unknown Origin" – 3:59
4. "Does It Dream" – 4:14
5. "Darker" – 4:01
6. "These Days" – 4:30
7. "Sleep Deprivation" – 4:25
8. "A Night Like This" (The Cure cover) – 3:28
9. "Everything in the World" – 3:20
10. "Dissolve" – 4:14
11. "Your World" – 3:35
12. "Painkiller Introduction" – 3:51
