= Enemy (American band) =

Band

- Origin: United States
- Genre: Alternative metal
- Years active: 2000–2006
- Label: The Control Group
- Past members: Troy Van Leeuwen; Eddie Nappi; Kellii Scott; Alan Cage
- Website: Official Site

Enemy was an American band fronted by guitarist and vocalist Troy Van Leeuwen (also of Queens of the Stone Age), with bassist Eddie Nappi (Handsome, Mark Lanegan Band), and drummer Kelli Scott (Failure). Former Quicksand drummer Alan Cage was a founding member before being replaced by Scott. Van Leeuwen has described Enemy as his "big, dumb rock trio".

Actually it's a vehicle driven by pure and utter disgust of mediocrity and general frustration with the human condition...[a]nd by obsession with anime.
--Van Leeuwen describing the band on their Myspace.com page.

== History ==
The concept for Enemy originated following the demise of Troy Van Leeuwen's previous band, Failure. In the interim, Van Leeuwen had joined A Perfect Circle, and Enemy managed to record a five-song demo during his downtime from touring:

We were doing what I call 'guerrilla-style' recording...[y]ou call in favors, get people to help you out and end up owing them money. We'd find a place, then spend a day tracking as many drum tracks as possible, then find another place — somebody's garage or something — and burn through a bunch of guitar tracks.
-- Troy Van Leeuwen with VH1.com, November 28, 2000

Taking the unusual step of offering to be signed by a record label by advertising for $250,000 on eBay, Enemy were ultimately signed by Control Group/TCG and released their debut album Hooray for Dark Matter in 2005.

== Discography ==
Release date	Title	Label
October 11, 2005	Hooray for Dark Matter	The Control Group, Five Knuckle Bullet
