= Snot (band) =

American nu metal/hardcore band

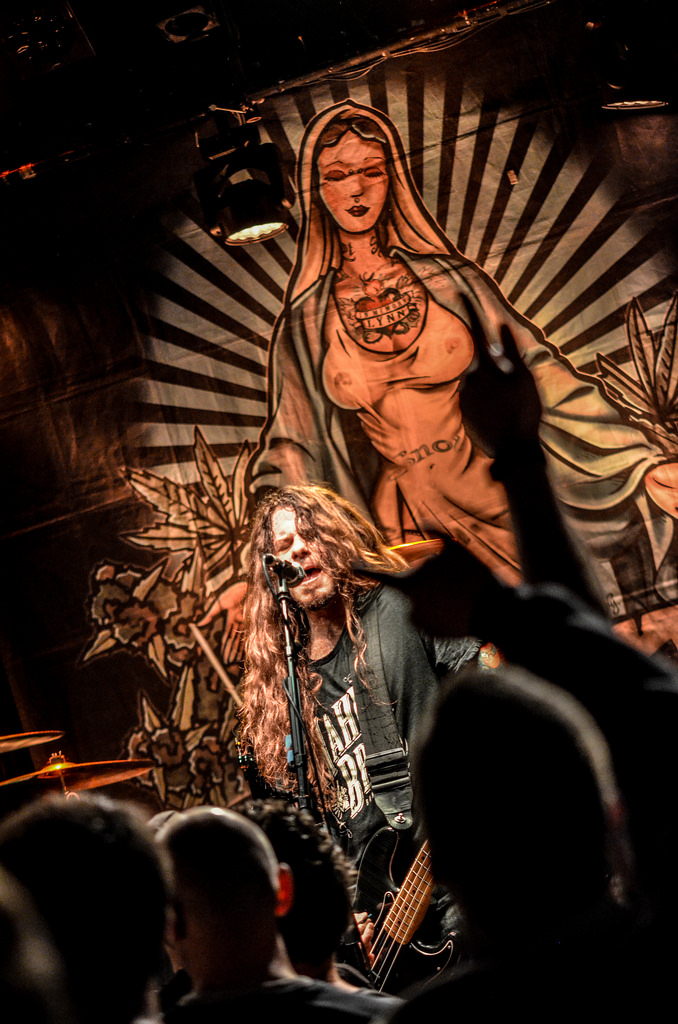
- John Fahnestock of Snot at Le Grillen, Colmar, 2015

Background information
- Origin: Santa Barbara, California, U.S.
- Genres: Nu metal; hardcore punk; funk metal
- Years active: 1995–1998; 2008–2011; 2014–2015; 2024–present
- Labels: Geffen; Immortal
- Members: Mikey Doling; John Fahnestock; Jamie Miller; Andy Knapp; Doc Coyle
- Past members: Lynn Strait; Sonny Mayo; Ruben Gonzalez; Brent; James "Fed" Carrol; Tommy Vext; Carl Bensley; Mike Smith; Dobbs Strait

Snot is an American nu metal band from Santa Barbara, California. Formed in 1995, the band released their only studio album Get Some with founding vocalist Lynn Strait in 1997 and disbanded after his death in 1998. In 2008, the lineup of lead guitarist Mikey Doling, bassist John Fahnestock, drummer Jamie Miller and rhythm guitarist Sonny Mayo reunited. In 2009, a new band, Tons, was formed, with Brandon Espinosa as vocalist. Snot reformed again in 2014, followed by another hiatus in 2015. The band reunited again in 2024, with Andy Knapp as their vocalist.

== History ==
=== Formation, Get Some and death of Lynn Strait (1995–1998) ===
The band was formed by singer Lynn Strait, the former bassist of a local punk band, Lethal Dose, and lead guitarist Mikey Doling, formerly of Kronix. After building a strong following with performances in Los Angeles, Snot signed with Geffen Records, and began work on their debut album with producer T-Ray. The album, titled Get Some, was released on May 13, 1997.

The band performed on the 1998 Ozzfest tour. On July 9, 1998, Strait was arrested in Mansfield, Massachusetts, after emerging nude from the oversized toilet prop used by Limp Bizkit in their performances. The band began work on their second album. On December 11, 1998, Strait died in a car accident when a truck struck his car, killing him and his dog, Dobbs. The band disbanded following Strait's death, with Doling stating, "We can't go on without Lynn. It's just bullshit when bands do that."

=== Post-accident (1999–2007) ===
Because Strait had not recorded vocals for the album, it was decided that the album's vocal tracks would be completed by friends of Strait as a tribute. Strait Up, released on November 7, 2000, featured appearances by the lead vocalists of System of a Down, Korn, Hed PE, Soulfly, Incubus, Sevendust, Limp Bizkit, Coal Chamber, Slipknot and Sugar Ray, among others. However, Doling told the Life is Peachy podcast in 2021, that the instrumental tracks written for the sophomore Snot album did not form the basis for Strait Up and he wrote new music for Strait Up, with each vocalists individual style in mind. It peaked at number 56 on the Billboard 200.

A live album, Alive!, was released on July 30, 2002. It peaked at number 12 on the Billboard Heatseekers chart. On April 5, 2007, the band reunited for a performance in Anaheim, California, with vocals performed by Invitro singer Jeff Weber.

=== First reunion, Tons and breakup (2008–2011) ===
In 2008, the band reformed, with Tommy Vext on vocals. Vext and Sonny Mayo left the band, and a new band, "Tons", was formed in 2009 with a new vocalist, Brandon Espinoza, formerly of Spineshank and minus knives. They have recorded new songs—"Ability & Control", "1000 Ways of Pain", "Fan the Flames", "New Enemies", "Underatax", and an unknown sixth song—before members of the group moved on to new projects.

=== Second reunion (2014–2015) ===
On February 11, 2014, Snot reunited again at the Whisky a Go Go in West Hollywood. This second reunion lineup once again features Vext, Mayo, Doling, Fahnestock and Miller. They went on to play three more shows in the Southern California area before once again going quiet, although they poked at the possibility of another future U.S. tour. In August it was announced that Snot would be hitting the road once again, starting November 28 and going through December 22 all throughout the U.S. An international tour is coming in January/February. However, in October, vocalist Tommy Vext announced he had left the band to form his new band, Westfield Massacre, and that Snot already had a replacement vocalist (Carl Bensley) in place. For the European dates, Mike Smith would fill in for Sonny Mayo, who was going to be unable to tour due to business commitments.

=== Third reunion (2024–present) ===
On September 29, 2024, after ten years of relative inactivity, Doling teased the return of Snot. The return was officially announced in November, with Mayo returning and a then unknown singer. The singer was announced to not be either Vext or Bensley. Andy Knapp was formally introduced as the new singer, with his first show with the band on January 17, 2025.

On April 25, 2025, Mayo left the band again ahead of their upcoming US tour to spend time with his family. Doc Coyle formerly of God Forbid and Bad Wolves will step in for the upcoming shows. On May 15, the band announced that former Godsmack drummer Shannon Larkin would fill in for Miller during their performance at that year's Welcome to Rockville, due to the latter touring with Bad Religion in Spain at the time. In July 2025, it was announced that Snot had entered the studio to begin recording new music under producer Chris Collier. As of May, 2026, they have completed 8 songs for their upcoming album.

== Musical style ==
Snot has been described as nu metal, hardcore punk, funk metal, and alternative metal.

== Members ==
Current lineup

- Mikey Doling – lead guitar (1995–1998, 2008–2011, 2014–2015, 2024–present)
- John "Tumor" Fahnestock – bass (1995–1998, 2008–2011, 2014–2015, 2024–present)
- Jamie Miller – drums (1996–1998, 2008–2011, 2014–2015, 2024–present)
- Andy Knapp – vocals (2024–present)
- Doc Coyle – rhythm guitar (2025–present)

Touring members

- Seven Antonopoulos – drums (2025–present; touring substitute for Miller)
- Angelo Miles – rhythm guitar (2026–present; touring substitute for Coyle)
- Shannon Larkin – drums (1998, 2025; touring substitute for Miller)

Former members

- Lynn Strait – vocals (1995–1998; died 1998)
- Ruben Gonzalez – bass (1995)
- Brent Trevino – drums (1995)
- Sonny Mayo – rhythm guitar (1995–1998, 2008–2009, 2014–2015, 2024–2025)
- James "Fed" Carrol – drums (1995–1996)
- Mike Smith – rhythm guitar (1998, 2015)
- Tommy Vext – vocals (2008–2009, 2014)
- Brandon Espinoza - vocals (2009)
- Carl Bensley – vocals (2014–2015)

Timeline

== Discography ==
=== Studio albums ===
- Get Some (1997)
- Strait Up (2000)

=== Live albums ===
- Alive! (2002)

=== Demos ===
- Snot (1995)
