= James Ford production discography =

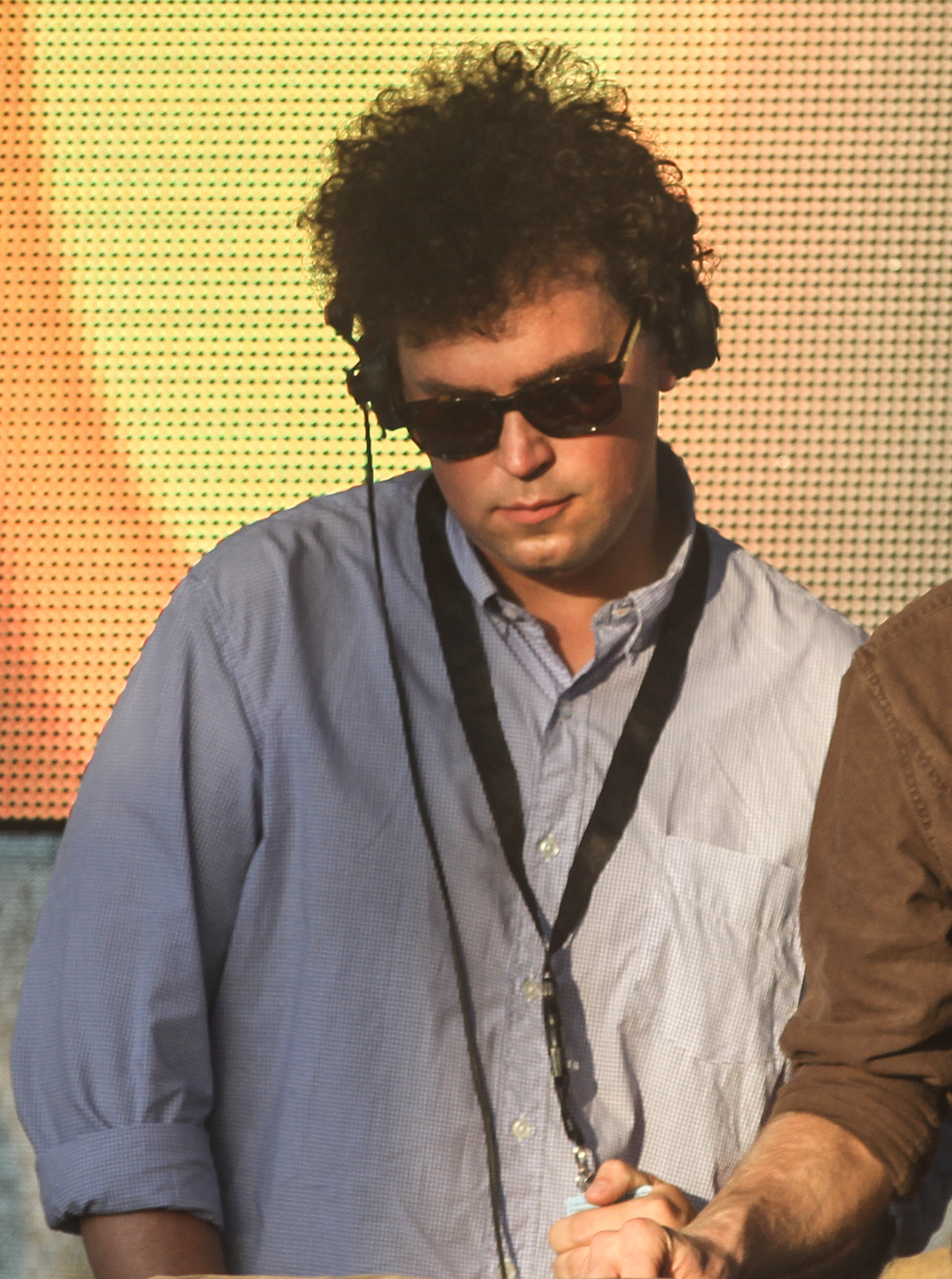
Ford in 2013

English record producer and songwriter James Ford has written and produced songs for various musicians, including Arctic Monkeys, Blur, Florence and the Machine, Depeche Mode, Haim, Jessie Ware, among others, also for his bands Simian Mobile Disco and the Last Shadow Puppets.

In 2023, Ford was named as the Producer of the Year by publication Consequence.

== Albums ==
This is a list of albums produced by James Ford in its entirety or majority, solo or with other producers.

Album	Year	Artist(s)	Other producers	Ref.
And the Big Red Nebula Band (As co-producer)	2004	Fingathing	Sneaky; Peter Parker	
Round & Round	2005	Garden	None	
For Screening Purposes Only	2005	Test Icicles	None	
Schmotime	2006	Absentee	None	
The Bright Lights and What I Should Have Learned	2006	Duels	None	
Making Dens	2006	Mystery Jets	Mystery Jets	
Favourite Worst Nightmare	2007	Arctic Monkeys	Mike Crossey	
Prince Umberto & The Sister Of Ill	2007	Bumblebeez	Invisibl	
Myths of the Near Future	2007	Klaxons	None	
Grown-Ups	2007	The Lodger	Alan Smyth	
Attack Decay Sustain Release	2007	Simian Mobile Disco	Jas Shaw	
The Age of the Understatement	2008	The Last Shadow Puppets	None	
Sleep Forever	2010	Crocodiles	None	
Detachments	2010	Detachments	None	
Crush Depth	2010	Chrome Hoof	Leo Smee	
Submarine (Extended play)	2011	Alex Turner	None	
EP (Extended play)	2011	Beth Ditto	Jas Shaw	
Suck It and See	2011	Arctic Monkeys	None	
A Bad Wind Blows in My Heart (As additional producer)	2013	Bill Ryder-Jones	Bill Ryder-Jones; Darren Jones^{[a]}	
AM (except "R U Mine?")	2013	Arctic Monkeys	Ross Orton	
Wilder Mind	2015	Mumford & Sons	None	
Message from the Other Side	2015	Damian Lazarus & the Ancient Moons	Damian Lazarus	
What Went Down	2015	Foals	None	
West Kirby County Primary (As additional producer)	2015	Bill Ryder-Jones	Bill Ryder-Jones	
Everything You've Come to Expect	2016	The Last Shadow Puppets	None	
Belladonna of Sadness	2017	Alexandra Savior	Alex Turner	
Spirit	2017	Depeche Mode	None	
Season High (As additional producer)	2017	Little Dragon	Little Dragon; Patrik Berger^{[a]}	
Everything Is Forgotten	2017	Methyl Ethel	Jake Webb	
Shock Machine	2017	Shock Machine	None	
What Do You Think About the Car? (Except "Brazil", "Paracetamol" and "Listen to Your Friends")	2017	Declan McKenna	Rostam Batmanglij; Max Marlow; Neil Comber	
A Fever Dream	2017	Everything Everything	Everything Everything	
Tranquility Base Hotel & Casino	2018	Arctic Monkeys	Alex Turner	
The Now Now	2018	Gorillaz	Gorillaz; Remi Kabaka Jr.	
Everything Not Saved Will Be Lost – Part 1 (As additional producer)	2019	Foals	Foals; Brett Shaw; Vincent Taurelle^{[a]} Tony Allen^{[a]}	
Everything Not Saved Will Be Lost – Part 2 (As additional producer)	2019	Foals	Foals; Brett Shaw; Vincent Taurelle^{[a]}	
What's Your Pleasure? (Except "Adore You")	2020	Jessie Ware	Benji B Adam Bainbridge; Morgan Geist; Midland^{[a]} Joseph Mount; Matthew Tavares	
Drunk Tank Pink	2021	Shame	None	
The Car	2022	Arctic Monkeys	None	
The Waeve	2023	The Waeve	Graham Coxon; Rose Elinor Dougall	
Memento Mori	2023	Depeche Mode	None	
That! Feels Good! (Except "Free Yourself", "Pearls", "Freak Me Now", and "Lightning")	2023	Jessie Ware	Stuart Price	
3D Country	2023	Geese	None	
The Ballad of Darren	2023	Blur	None	
Prelude to Ecstasy	2024	The Last Dinner Party	None	
Nonetheless	2024	Pet Shop Boys	None	
Lives Outgrown	2024	Beth Gibbons	Beth Gibbons	
Romance	2024	Fontaines D.C.	None	
City Lights	2024	The Waeve	None	
Cemetery Classics (As additional producer)	2024	Moon Diagrams	Moses Archuleta	
Forever Howlong	2025	Black Country, New Road	None	
More	2025	Pulp	None	
Générique	2025	Verlo	Alex Turner, Loren Humphrey	
The Mountain	2026	Gorillaz	Gorillaz, Samuel Egglenton, Remi Kabaka Jr., Bizarrap	
Help(2)	2026	Various (War Child)	None	
Emotional Junglist	2026	Nia Archives	Ethan P. Flynn, Jakwob, Nia Archives, Sampha	

== Songs ==
This is a list of song recordings written and/or produced by James Ford.

Song	Writers	Producers	Album	Year	Ref.
"Another Level" (Disclosure)	Disclosure; James Ford	—N/a	Never Enough	2021	
"Aries" (Gorillaz featuring Peter Hook and Georgia)	—N/a	Damon Albarn; Remi Kabaka Jr. James Ford; P2J^{[a]}	Song Machine, Season One: Strange Timez	2020	
"As Far as I Could Get" (Florence and the Machine)	Florence Welch; James Ford	—N/a	How Big, How Blue, How Beautiful	2015	
"Between Two Lungs" (Florence and the Machine)	—N/a	James Ford; Isabella Summers^{[a]}	Lungs	2009	
"British Bombs" (Declan McKenna)	—N/a	James Ford	Non-album single	2019	
"Broken English" (Halloweens)	Halloweens; James Ford	—N/a	Morning Kiss at the Acropolis	2020	
"Caught" (Florence and the Machine)	Florence Welch; James Ford	—N/a	How Big, How Blue, How Beautiful	2015	
"Celestial Dancers" (Birdy)	Birdy; Foy Vance; James Ford	—N/a	Young Heart	2021	
"Cornerstone" (Arctic Monkeys)	—N/a	James Ford	Humbug	2009	
"Count the Ways" (The Last Dinner Party)	Georgia Davies; Lizzie Mayland; Abigail Morris; Aurora Nishevci; Emily Roberts; Casper Miles; James Ford	—N/a	From the Pyre	2025	
"Cruel" (Jessie Ware)	Jessie Ware; James Ford; Dave Okumu	James Ford; Dave Okumu	Tough Love	2014	
"Deepest Lonely" (Birdy)	—N/a	James Ford	Young Heart	2021	
"Désolé" (Gorillaz featuring Fatoumata Diawara)	Damon Albarn; Remi Kabaka Jr. James Ford; Fatoumata Diawara	Damon Albarn; Remi Kabaka Jr. James Ford	Song Machine, Season One: Strange Timez	2020	
"Dog Days Are Over" (Florence and the Machine)	—N/a	James Ford; Isabella Summers^{[a]}	Lungs	2009	
"Don't Save Me" (Haim)	—N/a	Haim; James Ford	Days Are Gone	2013	
"Drumming Song" (Florence and the Machine)	Florence Welch; James Ford; Crispin Hunt	James Ford	Lungs	2009	
"Edge" (Haim)	—N/a	Haim; James Ford	Days Are Gone	2013	
"Everybody Scream" (Florence and the Machine)	—N/a	Florence Welch; Mark Bowen; James Ford; Aaron Dessner	Everybody Scream	2025	
"Fire and Rain" (Birdy)	—N/a	James Ford	Birdy	2011	
"Fort Knox (Sigrid)	—N/a	Sigrid; Askjell; James Ford	There's Always More That I Could Say	2025	
"Hardest of Hearts" (Florence and the Machine)	—N/a	James Ford; Isabella Summers^{[a]}	Lungs	2009	
"Hiding" (Florence and the Machine)	Florence Welch; James Ford	James Ford	How Big, How Blue, How Beautiful	2015	
"I'm Not Calling You a Liar" (Florence and the Machine)	—N/a	James Ford; Isabella Summers^{[a]}	Lungs	2009	
"If I Could Change Your Mind" (Haim)	Haim; James Ford	Haim; James Ford	Days Are Gone	2013	
"Kiss of Life" (Kylie Minogue and Jessie Ware)	Kylie Minogue; Jessie Ware; James Ford; Danny Parker; Shungudzo	James Ford	Disco: Guest List Edition	2021	
"Landscape" (Demo) (Florence and the Machine)	Florence Welch; James Ford	James Ford	Ceremonials	2011	
"Loneliness" (Birdy)	—N/a	James Ford	Young Heart	2021	
"The Lost Chord" (Gorillaz featuring Leee John)	Damon Albarn; Remi Kabaka Jr. James Ford; Leee John	Damon Albarn; Remi Kabaka Jr. James Ford	Song Machine, Season One: Strange Timez	2020	
"Midnight Caller" (Jessie Ware)	Jessie Ware; James Ford	James Ford	Tough Love	2014	
"Moderation" (Florence and the Machine)	Florence Welch; James Ford; Doveman; Matthew Daniel Siskin	James Ford; Matthew Daniel Siskin	Non-album single	2019	
"My Propeller" (Arctic Monkeys)	—N/a	James Ford	Humbug	2009	
"People Help the People" (Birdy)	—N/a	James Ford	Birdy	2011	
"Pure Feeling" (Florence and the Machine)	Florence Welch; James Ford	—N/a	How Big, How Blue, How Beautiful	2015	
"Run the Wild Flowers" (Friendly Fires)	Friendly Fires; James Ford	James Ford	Inflorescent	2019	
"Second Hand News" (Birdy)	—N/a	James Ford	Young Heart	2021	
"Secret Door" (Arctic Monkeys)	—N/a	James Ford	Humbug	2009	
"Send Me Down" (Haim)	—N/a	Haim; James Ford	Days Are Gone	2013	
"Shake" (Little Boots)	Little Boots; James Ford	James Ford	Nocturnes	2013	
"Shy Boy" (Carly Rae Jepsen)	—N/a	James Ford	The Loveliest Time	2023	
"Silhouettes" (Friendly Fires)	Friendly Fires; James Ford; Nick Hodgson	Mark Ralph; James Ford	Inflorescent	2019	
"St. Jude" (Florence and the Machine)	Florence Welch; James Ford	—N/a	How Big, How Blue, How Beautiful	2015	
"Surrender" (Birdy)	—N/a	James Ford	Young Heart	2021	
"Two Years" (Sigrid)	—N/a	Sigrid; Askjell; James Ford	There's Always More That I Could Say	2025	
"Want Your Feeling" (Jessie Ware)	—N/a	James Ford; Dev Hynes	Tough Love	2014	
"The Way We Are" (Jessie Ware)	Jessie Ware; Jimmy Napes; James Ford	James Ford	Tough Love	2014	
"This Is the Killer Speaking" (The Last Dinner Party)	Georgia Davies; Lizzie Mayland; Abigail Morris; Aurora Nishevci; Emily Roberts; Casper Miles; James Ford	—N/a	From the Pyre	2025	
"What You Don't Know" (Matthew Dear)	Matthew Dear; James Ford; Jas Shaw	Matthew Dear; James Ford; Jas Shaw	Bunny	2018	
"White Winter Hymnal" (Birdy)	—N/a	James Ford	Birdy	2011	
"Woman Is a Tree" (The Last Dinner Party)	Georgia Davies; Lizzie Mayland; Abigail Morris; Aurora Nishevci; Emily Roberts; Casper Miles; James Ford	—N/a	From the Pyre	2025	

== Notes ==
- ^{^[a]} signifies an additional producer
