= Nothing Matters (The Last Dinner Party song) =

2023 single by the Last Dinner Party

- Digital release cover

Single by the Last Dinner Party

from the album Prelude to Ecstasy
- Released: 19 April 2023
- Genre: Baroque pop; art pop; indie rock
- Length: 3:02
- Label: Universal
- Songwriters: Abigail Morris; Aurora Nishevci; Emily Roberts; Georgia Davies; Lizzie Mayland; Rhys Downing
- Producer: James Ford

The Last Dinner Party singles chronology
"Nothing Matters" (2023)	"Sinner" (2023)

Music video
- "Nothing Matters" on YouTube

"Nothing Matters" is the debut single by English indie rock band the Last Dinner Party. It was released on 19 April 2023 as the lead single from their debut album Prelude to Ecstasy (2024).

== Background ==
The Last Dinner Party quickly rose through the London live scene, receiving support slots for the Rolling Stones and Nick Cave before releasing any music. "Nothing Matters", their debut single, was released on 19 April 2023. The band released a statement on their Instagram page with the release of the song, reading "Thank you to everyone who has joined us on this journey so far, and to anyone who is new, welcome, take a seat at the dinner party. The feast is finally served".

== Lyrics and music ==
Lead singer Abigail Morris originally wrote the song as a "slow, sad ballad". However, the mood of the song changed once she reflected on the feelings of happiness regarding her relationship with her boyfriend at the time. The band collectively developed the song into its eventual form. "Put simply, it's a love song about not being afraid to be unbridled and unashamed in your passion for another person", the band said.

The Times described the song as a "thrilling rock, pop rush that sounded like ABBA or Sparks with a guitar solo by Brian May". The Line of Best Fit described it as containing "ornate art-pop melodies", "a sweeping Siouxsie-style chorus" and an "aesthetic of maximalism, grandeur, and joyful campy excess". Rolling Stone said it "was the kind of rock record that didn't seem to exist anymore ... the heady cocktail of cabaret, dank indie and wuthering-heights pop we needed, even if we didn't know it".

The song's chorus contains the lyric "I will fuck you like nothing matters". The radio edit changes the lyric to "I will have you like nothing matters", which the band performed during live television appearances on The Graham Norton Show and The Late Show with Stephen Colbert. The band met Courtney Love backstage at The Great Escape Festival in 2023, who suggested that the band censor the lyric to "I will punch you" for the radio edit.

Morris expressed frustration with the censored lyric, telling Variety in an interview, "There's no good word to fit in there ... because there's something so powerful about a woman saying 'I will fuck you', about being active rather than passive in sex. I didn't really think about how confident and secure that sounds as a sexual person".

== Commercial performance ==
The song debuted on the Billboard Adult Alternative Airplay chart in the United States for the week ending in July 1. It reached the top 10 in September.

"Nothing Matters" entered the UK Singles Chart at No. 71 on the week ending on 18 January 2024. A week before the release of Prelude to Ecstasy, the song cracked the top 40 by jumping 19 spots to No. 22.

== Critical reception ==
Billboard listed "Nothing Matters" at No. 94 in its staff's list of The 100 Best Songs of 2023. Triple J also listed the song at No. 89 in its Hottest 100 Songs of 2023.

== Music video ==
The music video was directed by Saorla Houston and references Sofia Coppola's 1999 film The Virgin Suicides and David Lynch's 2001 film Mulholland Drive. It was also inspired by Daisies (1966) and Black Swan (2010).

Most of the video was shot at Joldwynds, a 1930s Grade II listed modernist Art Deco house designed by Oliver Hill for the 1st Baron Greene. It is located on the Surrey Hills Area of Outstanding Natural Beauty overlooking the Weald.

== Cover versions ==
Sophie Ellis-Bextor performed a "faithful and energetic" cover of "Nothing Matters" in the BBC Radio 1 Live Lounge on 20 February 2024.

== In popular culture ==
The song is featured on the soundtrack of the video game EA Sports FC 24. The band remarked: "That's a whole generation of teenagers who will hear it and go 'that's a FIFA song' for the rest of their lives". It is also featured on The Sims 4: Life & Death, re-recorded by the band in Simlish, the game's fictional language.

== Charts ==
=== Weekly charts ===
Weekly chart performance for "Nothing Matters"
Chart (2023–2024)	Peak position
Germany Download (Official German Charts)	30
Latvia Airplay (LaIPA)	17
Lithuania Airplay (TopHit)	70
Ireland (IRMA)	22
UK Singles (Official Charts)	16
US Hot Rock & Alternative Songs (Billboard)	35
US Rock Airplay (Billboard)	15

=== Year-end charts ===
2023 year-end chart performance for "Nothing Matters"
Chart (2023)	Position
US Adult Alternative Songs (Billboard)	32

2024 year-end chart performance for "Nothing Matters"
Chart (2024)	Position
US Rock Airplay (Billboard)	34

== Certifications ==
Certifications for "Nothing Matters"
Region	Certification	Certified units/sales
Canada (Music Canada)	Gold	40,000^{‡}
New Zealand (RMNZ)	Gold	15,000^{‡}
United Kingdom (BPI)	Platinum	600,000^{‡}
United States (RIAA)	Gold	500,000^{‡}
^{‡} Sales+streaming figures based on certification alone.
