= Brit Awards 2025 =

British music awards ceremony

- Date: 1 March 2025
- Location: The O2 Arena
- Hosted by: Jack Whitehall

Highlights
- Most awards: Charli XCX (5)
- Most nominations: Charli XCX (6)
- Website: brits.co.uk

Television/radio coverage
- Network: ITV, ITV2 and ITVX (United Kingdom); YouTube (outside United Kingdom)

The Brit Awards 2025 was the 45th edition of the Brit Awards ceremony presented by British Phonographic Industry (BPI) to recognize the best in British and international music of 2024. The ceremony took place on Saturday 1 March 2025 at The O2 Arena in London. Jack Whitehall hosted the ceremony for the fifth time, returning as host after the 2021 ceremony. Harriet Rose and Munya Chawawa hosted ITV2's warm up show on 28 February. Launch show host Siân Welby was joined by Zeze Millz to host the live red carpet coverage on social media while Kiss Xtra DJ Henrie Kwushue and Jack Saunders provided backstage interviews during the ceremony.

For this year's ceremony, Charli XCX led the nominations with six, including British Album of the Year, Song of the Year and British Artist of the Year. Dua Lipa, the Last Dinner Party and Ezra Collective followed with four nominations each. The Beatles were nominated for Song of the Year for their "final song" "Now and Then", being their first nomination since 1983 where they were honoured with the Outstanding Contribution to Music award. Similarly, the Cure, who received three nominations including British Album of the Year for Songs of a Lost World (their first album in 16 years after 2008's 4:13 Dream), were nominated for an award for the first time since 1993.

== Background ==
=== Trophy ===
The designer for this year's trophy was artist Gabriel Moses. The sculpture was inspired by Moses' Nigerian heritage as well as his upbringing in South London.

=== Brits Week 2025 ===
In order to promote the awards ceremony and support the charity War Child, the BPI hosted a number of gigs as part of Brits Week. Artists performing as part of Brits Week included:

- Cat Burns at Moth Club, London (17 February)
- Joy Crookes at Islington Assembly Hall, London (18 February)
- Rachel Chinouriri at Omeara, London (20 February)
- Frank Turner at 93 Feet East, London (21 February)
- Nova Twins at Omeara, London (24 February)
- Kasabian with Blossoms at O2 Shepherd's Bush Empire, London (25 February)
- Clean Bandit and Friends at The Palladium, London (28 February)
- Tom Walker at King Tut's Wah Wah Hut, Glasgow (3 March)
- Soft Play at Village Underground, London (4 March)
- Rag'n'Bone Man at De La Warr Pavilion, Bexhill (5 March)

== Performers ==
=== Main ceremony ===
On 31 January 2025, the first batch of performers were announced. They included Little Mix member JADE, American singers Shaboozey and Teddy Swims, British singer Myles Smith and British group the Last Dinner Party. On 10 February, American singer Sabrina Carpenter was confirmed as a performer for the ceremony, as well as being announced as the recipient of the Brit Award for Global Success. On 17 February, the performer lineup was completed with the addition of Sam Fender and Lola Young. On 23 February, Shaboozey, via his Instagram Stories, announced that he would not be able to attend the ceremony due to "reasons beyond [his] control". On 26 February, just three days before the ceremony, Ezra Collective and Jorja Smith were announced to replace Shaboozey. A tribute montage was played during the show in memory of One Direction singer Liam Payne, who died in October 2024 aged 31.

List of performers
Artist(s)	Song(s)	UK Singles Chart reaction (week ending 13 March 2025)	UK Albums Chart reaction (week ending 13 March 2025)
Sabrina Carpenter	"Espresso" "Bed Chem"	N/A; 19 (+2)	Short n' Sweet - 1 (+2); Emails I Can't Send - 67 (+8)
Teddy Swims	"Bad Dreams" "The Door" "Lose Control"	10 (+6); 41 (+7); 32 (+9)	I've Tried Everything but Therapy (Part 2) - 21 (+14); I've Tried Everything but Therapy (Part 1) - 30 (+23)
Myles Smith	"Nice to Meet You" "Stargazing"	8 (+45); 43 (+23)	A Minute... - 72 (re-entry)
JADE	"Angel of My Dreams"	45 (re-entry)	—N/a
The Last Dinner Party	"Nothing Matters"	—N/a	—N/a
Lola Young	"Messy"	7 (+2)	This Wasn't Meant for You Anyway - 16 (new entry)
Sam Fender	"People Watching"	16 (-3)	People Watching - 4 (-3); Hypersonic Missiles - 87 (-8); Seventeen Going Under - 88 (-11)
Ezra Collective; Jorja Smith	"Shaking Body" "Ajala" "Victory Dance" "Little Things"	—N/a	—N/a

== Winners and nominees ==
The Rising Star shortlist was revealed on 26 November 2024. The complete list of nominees was announced on 23 January 2025. Winners appear first and are highlighted in bold.

British Album of the Year (presented by Teddy Swims)	Song of the Year (presented by Lenny Kravitz)
**Charli XCX – Brat**; The Cure – Songs of a Lost World; Dua Lipa – Radical Optimism; Ezra Collective – Dance, No One's Watching; The Last Dinner Party – Prelude to Ecstasy	**Charli XCX featuring Billie Eilish – "Guess"**; Artemas – "I Like the Way You Kiss Me"; The Beatles – "Now and Then"; Bl3ss with Camrin Watsin featuring Bbyclose – "Kisses"; Central Cee featuring Lil Baby – "Band4Band"; Chase & Status featuring Stormzy – "Backbone"; Coldplay – "Feelslikeimfallinginlove"; Dua Lipa – "Training Season"; Ella Henderson featuring Rudimental – "Alibi"; JADE – "Angel of My Dreams"; Jordan Adetunji – "Kehlani"; KSI featuring Trippie Redd – "Thick of It"; Myles Smith – "Stargazing"; Sam Ryder – "You're Christmas to Me"; Sonny Fodera with Jazzy and D.O.D. – "Somedays"
British Artist of the Year (presented by Jared Leto)	British Group (presented by Naomie Harris)
**Charli XCX**; Beabadoobee; Central Cee; Dua Lipa; Fred Again; Jamie xx; Michael Kiwanuka; Nia Archives; Rachel Chinouriri; Sam Fender	**Ezra Collective**; Bring Me the Horizon; Coldplay; The Cure; The Last Dinner Party
Best Pop Act (presented by Sugababes)	Best R&B Act (presented by Jason Isaacs)
**JADE**; Charli XCX; Dua Lipa; Lola Young; Myles Smith	**Raye**; Cleo Sol; Flo; Jorja Smith; Michael Kiwanuka
Best Dance Act (presented by Paloma Faith)	Best Alternative/Rock Act (presented by Serge Pizzorno)
**Charli XCX**; Becky Hill; Chase & Status; Fred Again; Nia Archives	**Sam Fender**; Beabadoobee; The Cure; Ezra Collective; The Last Dinner Party
Best Hip Hop/Grime/Rap Act (presented by Vick Hope and Bre Tiesi)	Best New Artist (presented by Jourdan Dunn and Emmett J. Scanlan)
**Stormzy**; Central Cee; Dave; Ghetts; Little Simz	**The Last Dinner Party**; English Teacher; Ezra Collective; Myles Smith; Rachel Chinouriri
International Artist of the Year (presented by Martin Compston & Vicky McClure)	International Group of the Year (presented by Munya Chawawa & Harriet Rose)
**Chappell Roan**; Adrianne Lenker; Asake; Benson Boone; Beyoncé; Billie Eilish; Kendrick Lamar; Sabrina Carpenter; Taylor Swift; Tyler, the Creator	**Fontaines D.C.**; Amyl and the Sniffers; Confidence Man; Future and Metro Boomin; Linkin Park
Best International Song (presented by Danny Dyer)	Rising Star (presented by the Last Dinner Party)
**Chappell Roan – "Good Luck, Babe!"**; Benson Boone – "Beautiful Things"; Beyoncé – "Texas Hold 'Em"; Billie Eilish – "Birds of a Feather"; Djo – "End of Beginning"; Eminem – "Houdini"; Hozier – "Too Sweet"; Jack Harlow – "Lovin on Me"; Noah Kahan – "Stick Season"; Post Malone featuring Morgan Wallen – "I Had Some Help"; Sabrina Carpenter – "Espresso"; Shaboozey – "A Bar Song (Tipsy)"; Taylor Swift featuring Post Malone – "Fortnight"; Teddy Swims – "Lose Control"; Tommy Richman – "Million Dollar Baby"	**Myles Smith**; Elmiene; Good Neighbours
Songwriter of the Year
**Charli XCX**
Producer of the Year
**A.G. Cook**
Global Success Award (presented by Diana Ross and Millie Bobby Brown)
**Sabrina Carpenter**

== Multiple nominations and awards ==
Artists who received multiple nominations
Nominations	Artist
6	Charli XCX
4	Dua Lipa
4	Ezra Collective
4	The Last Dinner Party
3	Billie Eilish
3	The Cure
3	Central Cee
3	Myles Smith
2	Beabadoobee
2	JADE
2	Fred Again
2	Beyoncé
2	Sabrina Carpenter
2	Chappell Roan
2	Benson Boone
2	Michael Kiwanuka
2	Nia Archives
2	Rachel Chinouriri
2	Sam Fender
2	Coldplay
2	Chase & Status
2	Stormzy
2	Taylor Swift
2	Post Malone

Artists who received multiple awards
Wins	Artist
5	Charli XCX
2	Chappell Roan
