= Sinner (The Last Dinner Party song) =

2023 single by the Last Dinner Party

Single by the Last Dinner Party

from the album Prelude to Ecstasy
- Released: 30 June 2023
- Genre: Baroque pop; art pop; indie rock
- Length: 2:56
- Label: Universal
- Songwriters: Abigail Morris; Aurora Nishevci; Emily Roberts; Georgia Davies; Lizzie Mayland; Rhys Downing
- Producer: James Ford

The Last Dinner Party singles chronology
| "Nothing Matters" (2023) | "Sinner" (2023) | "My Lady of Mercy" (2023) |

Music video
- "Sinner" on YouTube

"Sinner" is a song by English indie rock band the Last Dinner Party. It was released on 30 June 2023 as the second single from their debut album Prelude to Ecstasy (2024) by Universal.

== Production and release ==
Recorded by the band for their debut album Prelude to Ecstasy, the song was produced by James Ford and features as the eighth track on the album. On working with Ford, lead singer Abigail Morris opined; "I think I can speak for all of us when I say he's the best person we've ever worked with musically".

The single was released on 30 June 2023 through digital storefronts and streaming services by Universal. A physical release of the single on 7" vinyl was released on 19 July 2024, featuring new artwork and a live version of the song recorded at Melkweg, Amsterdam.

== Music and lyrics ==
"Sinner" is an indie rock song with elements of post-punk. The Guardian described the song as having "a keen pop sensibility on display" with "impressively stadium-ready axe heroics". According to Rolling Stone, the track could be the soundtrack to "a bacchanalian orgy in old Soho".

The song was written by guitarist Lizzie Mayland and is about their "relationship with London and where I grew up". Speaking to The Line of Best Fit they described escaping "prejudices" and coming from a place that is "small-minded socially". Moving away they opined; "you feel freer [to] be yourself and express your sexuality".

== Track listings ==
All music is composed by The Last Dinner Party.

7-inch vinyl
| No. | Title | Writer(s) | Length |
|---|---|---|---|
| 1. | "Sinner" | Lizzie Mayland | 2:56 |
| 2. | "Sinner – Live from Melkweg, Amsterdam" | Lizzie Mayland | 3:13 |

== Personnel ==
Adapted from the liner notes of Prelude to Ecstasy.

The Last Dinner Party

- Georgia Davies – bass guitar, additional vocals
- Lizzie Mayland – additional vocals, guitar
- Abigail Morris – lead vocals
- Aurora Nishevci – additional vocals, organ, piano, synthesizer
- Emily Roberts – guitar, additional vocals

Additional musicians

- Alistair Goodwin – bass trombone
- Robyn Blair – French horn
- Bradley Jones – trumpet
- Lucy Humphris – trumpet
- Chris Brewster – trombone
- James Ford – drums

Technical

- James Ford – production
- Chris Gehringer – mastering
- Alan Moulder – mixing
- Jimmy Robertson – engineering

== Charts ==
=== Weekly charts ===
Weekly chart performance for "Sinner"
| Chart (2024) | Peak position |
|---|---|
| Canada Modern Rock (Billboard Canada) | 18 |
| UK Singles Sales (OCC) | 12 |
| US Rock Airplay (Billboard) | 21 |

=== Year-end charts ===
Year-end chart performance for "Sinner"
| Chart (2024) | Position |
|---|---|
| US Rock Airplay (Billboard) | 50 |

Year-end chart performance for "Sinner"
| Chart (2025) | Position |
|---|---|
| Canada Modern Rock (Billboard) | 57 |

== Release history ==
Release history for "Sinner"
| Region | Date | Format(s) | Label(s) |
|---|---|---|---|
| Various | 30 June 2023 | Digital download; streaming | Universal |
| Various | 19 July 2024 | 7" vinyl; digital download; streaming | Universal |
