= Help(2) =

2026 charity album by various artists

Compilation album by various artists
- Released: 6 March 2026
- Recorded: November 2025
- Studio: Abbey Road (London)
- Length: 86:30
- Label: War Child Records
- Producer: James Ford

War Child charity albums chronology
War Child Presents Heroes (2009)	Help(2) (2026)	Forever Young (2026)

Singles from Help(2)
- 1. "Opening Night" Released: 22 January 2026; 2. "Flags" Released: 12 February 2026; 3. "Let's Do It Again!" Released: 17 February 2026; 4. "Begging for Change" Released: 19 February 2026; 5. "Helicopters" Released: 26 February 2026

Help(2) is a charity album created by the organisation War Child in order to raise funds for their work involving helping children living through war. It was released on 6 March 2026 through War Child Records. A continuation of its predecessor, The Help Album (1995), the album was produced by James Ford and was recorded in Abbey Road Studios in November 2025. It features a variety of artists such as Arctic Monkeys, Fontaines D.C., Olivia Rodrigo, Black Country, New Road, Cameron Winter, Beabadoobee, and Depeche Mode among others, while previous contributing artists such as Damon Albarn, Pulp and Oasis returned to collaborate.

Five singles were released in promotion of the album; "Opening Night" on 22 January, "Flags" on 12 February, "Let's Do It Again!" on 17 February, "Begging for Change" on 19 February and "Helicopters" on 26 February. Help(2) was received positively by critics, who were positive about the album's line-up of artists and described it as a worthy sequel to The Help Album.

The album will accompany a documentary film directed by Jonathan Glazer.

== Background and production ==
War Child is a charity which "[works] to protect, educate and stand up for the rights of children living through conflict". In previous years, War Child has released compilation albums bringing artists together to raise funds for the charity and to spread awareness. Most notable was The Help Album produced by Brian Eno, which was recorded in a single day in September 1995 and featured contributions from artists such as Radiohead, Blur and Oasis. The album would go on to sell 70,000 copies in its first week and raise £1,200,000 for the charity.

In 2025, War Child reached out to James Ford and asked him to work on Help(2), to which he felt "incredibly honoured". The album was recorded over a period of one week in Abbey Road Studios. During recording of the album, artists often collaborated with each other; examples include a choir consisting of members from English Teacher, Pulp and Black Country, New Road among others on "Flags", Cameron Winter and cellist Amy Langley performing together on "Warning" and Olivia Rodrigo with Blur guitarist Graham Coxon for "The Book of Love", a cover of the song by the Magnetic Fields.

== Release ==
War Child teased the album earlier in January 2026 with an Instagram post reading "There is a group of artists who are working on something in support of War Child. There will be more information coming soon." On 20 January, War Child confirmed the release of a brand new song by Arctic Monkeys, accompanied by a short slow-motion video of a child running into the sea. The song, titled "Opening Night", was released on 22 January, alongside the announcement of the album, scheduled to be released on 6 March 2026. "Opening Night" is a ballad about "political sloganeering" and "supercomputer crusades"; it had been worked on a couple of years before its release, but was unfinished. The second single "Flags", by Damon Albarn, Grian Chatten and Kae Tempest, was released on 12 February. The third single, "Let's Do It Again!" by The Last Dinner Party, was released on 17 February. The fourth single, "Begging for Change" by Pulp, was released on 19 February. A fifth single, "Helicopters" by Ezra Collective and Greentea Peng, was released on 26 February. On 2 March, it was revealed that a recording of Oasis' "Acquiesce" taken from their Live '25 Tour would be made available as a bonus track.

The album will include a companion film by Jonathan Glazer; Glazer gave cameras to children throughout the studio while the album was being recorded, allowing them to record artists without any restrictions. Footage recorded by children in Ukraine, Gaza, Yemen and Sudan was also obtained by Glazer's team and used in the film.

== Reception ==
Professional ratings
Aggregate scores
Source	Rating
Metacritic	82/100
Review scores
Source	Rating
AllMusic	4/5 stars
DIY	4.5/5 stars
Dork	4/5 stars
Hot Press	10/10
Pitchfork	7.6/10
Rolling Stone	3.5/5 stars
The Scotsman	4/5 stars
Under the Radar	8/10
Uncut	4.5/5 stars

Help(2) was received positively by critics upon release. At Metacritic, which aggregates scores from mainstream critics, Help(2) received a rating of 82 out of 100 based on six critic reviews, indicating "universal acclaim".

In a review for DIY, Matthew Davies Lombardi said the album had "something here for everyone" and that it was great to see a large variety of artists take part. Will Russell of Hot Press called it a "collaborative album on steroids" and said it had a good range of featured artists. Writing for Rolling Stone, Jonathan Bernstein described the album as "remarkably on-message and cohesive" and a "gratifying follow up to its storied predecessor".

Fiona Shepherd of The Scotsman said the album's line-up was "superb". Writing for Stereogum, Tom Breihan said that while some songs "[blurred] into each other", the album as a whole was enjoyable. Breihan also noted the album releasing shortly after the start of the 2026 Iran war made the songs "hit a little harder than they did before".

In an article for The Times, Jonathan Dean described the album as "another stellar collection by the biggest stars in the world". Andy Von Pip of Under the Radar said the album was "heartfelt" and that it "bridges generations and genres".

== Track listing ==
Help(2) track listing
No.	Title	Writer(s)	Producer(s)	Length
1.	"Opening Night" (Arctic Monkeys)	Alexander David Turner	James Ford; Loren Humphrey; Alex Turner	4:19
2.	"Flags" (Damon Albarn, Grian Chatten and Kae Tempest)	Albarn; Chatten; Tempest	Albarn; Ford; Marta Salogni; Toby L	5:07
3.	"Strangers" (Black Country, New Road)	Charlie Wayne; Georgia Ellery; Lewis Evans; Luke Mark; May Kershaw; Tyler Hyde	Salogni	4:29
4.	"Let's Do It Again!" (The Last Dinner Party)	Abigail Morris; Aurora Nishevci; Emily Roberts; Georgia Davies; Ford; Lizzie Mayland; Luca Caruso	Ford; Animesh Raval	4:31
5.	"Sunday Morning" (Beth Gibbons)	John Cale; Lou Reed	Ford	4:50
6.	"Lilac Wine" (Arooj Aftab and Beck)	James Shelton	Beck Hansen	3:46
7.	"The 343 Loop" (King Krule)	Archy Marshall	Marshall	2:06
8.	"Universal Soldier" (Depeche Mode)	Buffy Sainte-Marie	Ford	3:21
9.	"Helicopters" (Ezra Collective and Greentea Peng)	Aria Wells; Ifeoluwa Ogunjobi; Joe Armon-Jones; James Mollison; Olufemi Koleoso; Toyosi Koleoso	Ezra Collective	3:58
10.	"Nothing I Could Hide" (Arlo Parks)	Parks; Baird Robert Wittner Acheson	Baird	2:58
11.	"Parasite" (English Teacher and Graham Coxon)	Douglas Frost; Lewis Whiting; Lily Fontaine; Nicholas Eden	David Wrench	3:10
12.	"Say Yes" (Beabadoobee)	Elliott Smith	Catherine Marks	2:37
13.	"Relive, Redie" (Big Thief)	Adrianne Lenker	Dom Monks; James Krivchenia	3:34
14.	"Black Boys on Mopeds" (Fontaines D.C.)	Sinéad O'Connor	Raval; Ford; Humphrey	3:34
15.	"Warning" (Cameron Winter)	Winter	Winter	4:32
16.	"Don't Fight the Young" (Young Fathers)	Alloysious Massaquoi; Graham Hastings; Kayus Bankole	Massaquoi; Hastings; Bankole	2:28
17.	"Begging for Change" (Pulp)	Adam Betts; Andrew McKinney; Candida Doyle; Emma Smith; Jarvis Cocker; Jason Buckle; Mark Webber; Nick Banks	Raval; Ford	4:21
18.	"Naboo" (Sampha)	Sampha Sisay	Sisay	3:14
19.	"Obvious" (Wet Leg)	Rhian Teasdale	Jon McMullen	3:31
20.	"When the War Is Finally Done" (Foals)	Yannis Philippakis	Wrench; Lake Turner	3:58
21.	"Carried My Girl" (Bat for Lashes)	Natasha Khan	Khan; David Kosten	3:55
22.	"Sunday Light" (Anna Calvi, Nilüfer Yanya, Dove Ellis and Ellie Rowsell)	Calvi	Marks	4:02
23.	"The Book of Love" (Olivia Rodrigo)	Stephin Merritt	Marks; Ford; Toby L	4:09
Total length:				86:30

Bonus track
No.	Title	Writer(s)	Producer(s)	Length
24.	"Acquiesce" (Live from Wembley Stadium, 28 September '25) (Oasis)	Noel Gallagher	Callum Marinho	4:10
Total length:				90:40

== Charts ==
Chart performance for Help(2)
Chart (2026)	Peak position
Australian Albums (ARIA)	18
Austrian Albums (Ö3 Austria)	8
Belgian Albums (Ultratop Flanders)	2
Belgian Albums (Ultratop Wallonia)	4
Croatian International Albums (HDU)	4
Danish Albums (Hitlisten)	31
Dutch Albums (Album Top 100)	13
French Albums (SNEP)	31
German Compilation Albums (Offizielle Top 100)	1
Irish Compilation Albums (IRMA)	1
Italian Albums (FIMI)	40
Japanese Dance & Soul Albums (Oricon)	3
Japanese Download Albums (Billboard Japan)	63
Japanese Western Albums (Oricon)	11
New Zealand Albums (RMNZ)	24
Polish Albums (ZPAV)	53
Portuguese Albums (AFP)	21
Swedish Physical Albums (Sverigetopplistan)	12
UK Compilation Albums (Official Charts)	1
US Independent Albums (Billboard)	47
US Top Album Sales (Billboard)	18
