= From the Pyre =

Studio album by the Last Dinner Party
- Released: 17 October 2025
- Recorded: 2025
- Genres: Baroque pop; art rock
- Length: 42:58
- Label: Island
- Producer: Markus Dravs

The Last Dinner Party chronology
Prelude to Ecstasy (2024)	From the Pyre (2025)

Singles from From the Pyre
- 1. "This Is the Killer Speaking" Released: 17 July 2025; 2. "The Scythe" Released: 5 September 2025; 3. "Second Best" Released: 1 October 2025; 4. "Count the Ways" Released: 16 October 2025

From the Pyre is the second studio album by the English rock band the Last Dinner Party, released on 17 October 2025 on Island Records. Produced by Markus Dravs and mixed by Alan Moulder, the album was preceded by the singles, "This Is the Killer Speaking", "The Scythe", "Second Best" and "Count the Ways". Following the album's release, music videos for "Sail Away" and "Agnus Dei", were also released. The album is the follow-up to their critically acclaimed and award-nominated debut album, 2024's Prelude to Ecstasy.

After touring extensively with the band throughout 2024 and 2025, regular session drummer Casper Miles participated in the writing and recording process of the album alongside the core band members.

== Background and style ==
Originally, work had begun on the album in late 2024 with producer James Ford, who had produced the band's debut album, Prelude to Ecstasy, released earlier that year. However, Ford had to leave the following year after being diagnosed with leukaemia. By July, Ford had been in remission. From the Pyre was ultimately recorded in 2025 with producer Markus Dravs. The band said the songs from the album "are character-driven but still deeply personal," adding that the record is intended to be "a little darker, more raw and more earthy" than Prelude to Ecstasy.

== Promotion and singles ==
On 17 July 2025, the band released the lead single "This Is the Killer Speaking" alongside a music video and the announcement for the album. The song, which originally debuted live at the Metronome Festival in Prague in June 2024, was described in Billboard as "jaunty" and "country-tinged". In the U.S., the single reached No. 17 on the Adult Alternative Airplay chart and #26 on the Alternative Airplay chart. The second single, "The Scythe", was released on 5 September with another music video and additional details for their upcoming tour. On 1 October, they released the third single "Second Best" with a lyric video. The song, which took inspiration from Sparks (whom they covered on "This Town Ain't Big Enough for Both of Us" the previous year), was written by the Last Dinner Party's guitarist Emily Roberts, and it is based on her experience in a past relationship that involved recurrent betrayal. Upon the album's release, the band released the album's fourth single and music video for "Count the Ways" which reached No. 29 on the Adult Alternative Airplay chart. On 16 November 2025, band released the music video for "Sail Away"..On 11 December 2025 they released a video for "Agnus Dei".

The band began a UK tour in October 2025 and will embark on a thirty-one date North American tour in March 2026.

== Critical reception ==
Professional ratings
Aggregate scores
Source	Rating
AnyDecentMusic?	8.2/10
Metacritic	82/100
Review scores
Source	Rating
AllMusic	4/5 stars
The Arts Desk	4/5 stars
Classic Pop	4/5 stars
DIY	5/5 stars
The Line of Best Fit	8/10
MusicOMH	4.5/5 stars
Record Collector	5/5 stars
Rolling Stone UK	5/5 stars
The Times	4/5 stars
Uncut	7/10

According to the review aggregator Metacritic, From the Pyre received "universal acclaim" based on a weighted average score of 82 out of 100 from 13 critic scores. Another aggregator, AnyDecentMusic?, gave the album 8.2 out of 10 based on 19 reviews. Writing for The Line of Best Fit, John Amen gave the album an 8/10 rating and concluded, "Pyre, like/perhaps slightly more than Prelude, is fiercely ambitious, gloriously messy, and wickedly entrancing".

=== Year-end lists ===
Publication	List	Rank	Ref.
AllMusic	Best of 2025	N/A	
AllMusic	Favorite Rock & Metal Albums	N/A	
DIY	2025 Albums of the Year	10	
Hot Press	50 Best Albums of 2025	11	
NME	The 50 Albums of 2025	29	
Record Collector	The Best of 2025: New Albums Top 25	22	
Rough Trade	Albums of the Year 2025	31	
Under the Radar	Top 100 Albums of 2025	24	

== Track listing ==
All tracks are written by Georgia Davies, Lizzie Mayland, Abigail Morris, Aurora Nishevci, Emily Roberts, and Casper Miles, with additional writers noted.

From the Pyre track listing
No.	Title	Add. writer(s)	Length
1.	"Agnus Dei"		5:33
2.	"Count the Ways"	James Ford	3:58
3.	"Second Best"		3:31
4.	"This Is the Killer Speaking"	Ford	4:54
5.	"Rifle"		4:31
6.	"Woman Is a Tree"	Ford	3:57
7.	"I Hold Your Anger"		4:21
8.	"Sail Away"	Henry Spychalski	3:59
9.	"The Scythe"		4:45
10.	"Inferno"		3:29
Total length:			42:58

== Personnel ==
Credits adapted from Tidal.

=== The Last Dinner Party ===
- Georgia Davies – background vocals (tracks 1–8), bass (except 8)
- Lizzie Mayland – lead vocals (5), background vocals (except 5), rhythm guitar (except 8)
- Abigail Morris – lead vocals (except 5, 7), background vocals (5)
- Aurora Nishevci – lead vocals (7), background vocals (1–6, 8), piano (all tracks); conductor, string arrangement (except 8); organ (6)
- Emily Roberts – lead guitar (except 8), background vocals (all), flute (9)

=== Additional musicians ===
- Casper Miles – drums (except 8)
- Miriam Wakeling – cello (except 8)
- Cristina Cooper – cello (1–7, 9)
- Cecil Bignall – cello (1–7, 10)
- Fraser Bowles – cello (9, 10)
- Jordan Black, Jordi Juan Perez – clarinet (1, 3, 4)
- Pedro López, Rebecca Speller – flute (1, 3, 4)
- Sian Collins – French horn (4, 7, 10)
- Elise Campbell – French horn (4)
- Eleanor Blakeney – French horn (7, 10)
- Lorna Blackwood – programming (2, 8, 9)
- Nathen Durasamy – string arrangement (except 8)
- Elliot Slater – tenor saxophone (1, 3, 4)
- Jane Salmon – trombone (4)
- Phil Entwistle – trombone (7)
- Adam Chatterton, Matt Roberts – trumpet (4)
- Harry Evans, Kaitlin Wild – trumpet (7)
- Helena Sánchez, Irene Katsenelson – viola (except 8)
- Jordan Bergmans – viola (1–4, 6, 9, 10)
- Duncan Commin – viola (5, 7, 10)
- Will Harvey – violin (except 8)
- Kelly Moncaka, William Newell – violin (1–4, 6, 9)
- Tadasuke Iljima – violin (1, 3, 5, 7, 10)
- Collie Chan, Yuliya Ostapchuk – violin (1, 3)
- Elena Abad – violin (2, 4–6, 9, 10)
- Cristina Morell, Laci Olah – violin (2, 4, 6, 9)
- Coco Inman, Iryna Glyebova, Stuart McDonald – violin (5, 7, 10)

=== Technical ===
- Markus Dravs – production (all tracks), vocal production (2, 8, 9)
- Lorna Blackwood – vocal production (2, 8, 9)
- Tom Roach – engineering
- Eve Morris – engineering (1, 3, 4), recording (2, 4, 6, 9)
- Fiona Cruickshank – engineering (2, 4–7, 9, 10)
- Chiara Ferracuti, James Poucher, Luke Glazewski – engineering assistance
- George Lloyd-Owen – engineering assistance (1, 3, 4)
- Rebecca Horden – engineering assistance (2, 4, 6, 9, 10), recording (1, 3, 4)
- Marta Di Nozzi – engineering assistance (5, 7, 10)
- Alan Moulder – mixing
- Finn Howells – mixing assistance
- Christopher Parker – recording (5, 7, 10)
- Chris Gehringer – mastering

== Charts ==
Chart performance for From the Pyre
Chart (2025)	Peak position
Australian Albums (ARIA)	7
Austrian Albums (Ö3 Austria)	10
Belgian Albums (Ultratop Flanders)	8
Belgian Albums (Ultratop Wallonia)	24
Dutch Albums (Album Top 100)	6
French Albums (SNEP)	61
French Rock & Metal Albums (SNEP)	5
German Albums (Offizielle Top 100)	9
German Rock & Metal Albums (Offizielle Top 100)	3
Greek Albums (IFPI)	85
Irish Albums (Official Charts)	12
Japanese Western Albums (Oricon)	25
New Zealand Albums (RMNZ)	24
Polish Albums (ZPAV)	41
Portuguese Albums (AFP)	87
Scottish Albums (Official Charts)	1
Swedish Physical Albums (Sverigetopplistan)	14
Swiss Albums (Schweizer Hitparade)	14
UK Albums (Official Charts)	2
US Top Album Sales (Billboard)	16
