= Brit Award for Global Success =

British music award

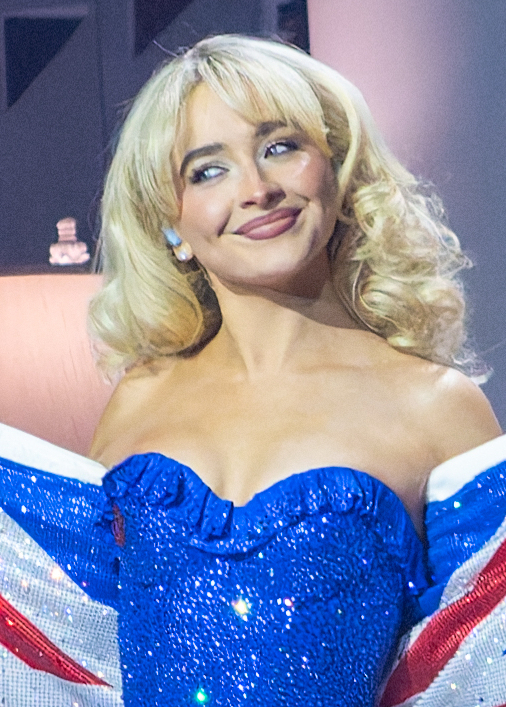
- 2025 winner Sabrina Carpenter
- Awarded for: Achievement in excellence in music
- Country: United Kingdom (UK)
- Presented by: British Phonographic Industry (BPI)
- First award: 2013-2019, 2025
- Currently held by: Sabrina Carpenter (2025)

Highlights
- Most awards: One Direction, Adele, and Ed Sheeran (2)
- Website: www.brits.co.uk

The Global Success Award was a special achievement award given by the British Phonographic Industry (BPI), an organisation which represents record companies and artists in the United Kingdom. The accolade is presented at the Brit Awards, an annual celebration of British and international music. The honourees are determined by the Brit Awards voting academy with over one-thousand members, which comprise record labels, publishers, managers, agents, media, and previous winners and nominees. The award is presented to an artist with "phenomenal global sales" during the eligibility period and, as of 2025, can be awarded to both British and international performers.

== History ==
The award was first presented at the 2013 Brit Awards and was then presented annually until 2019. On 10 February 2025, it was announced that the award would be revived and presented to Sabrina Carpenter, who would become the first international artist to receive the honour. The BBC suggested that the decision to revive an award for which only British acts had previously been eligible and present it to Carpenter was "a thinly-veiled ploy" to get her to perform at the ceremony and that the decision had only been taken because "they needed something to honour Sabrina". The award did not return for the 2026 ceremony.

== Recipients ==
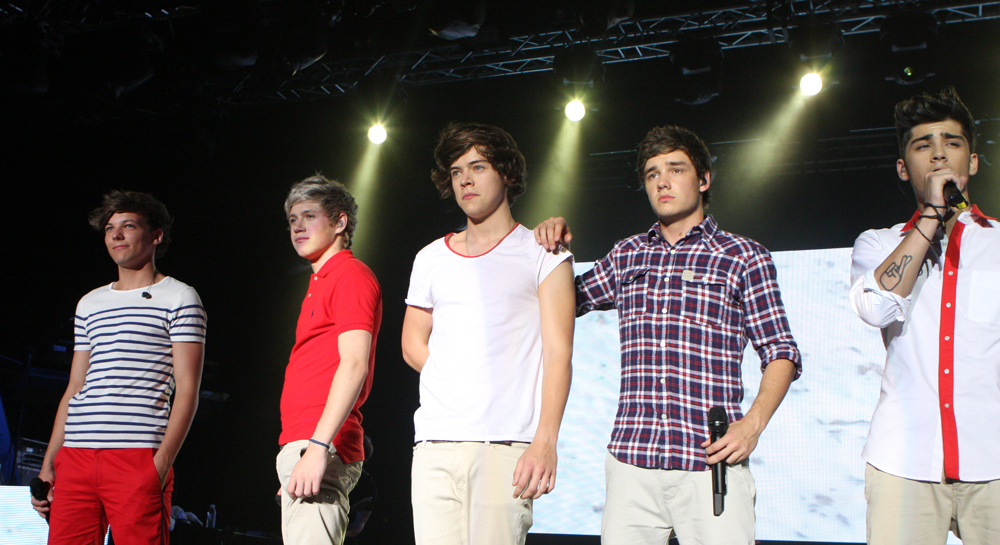
Inaugural recipients and two-time winners One Direction

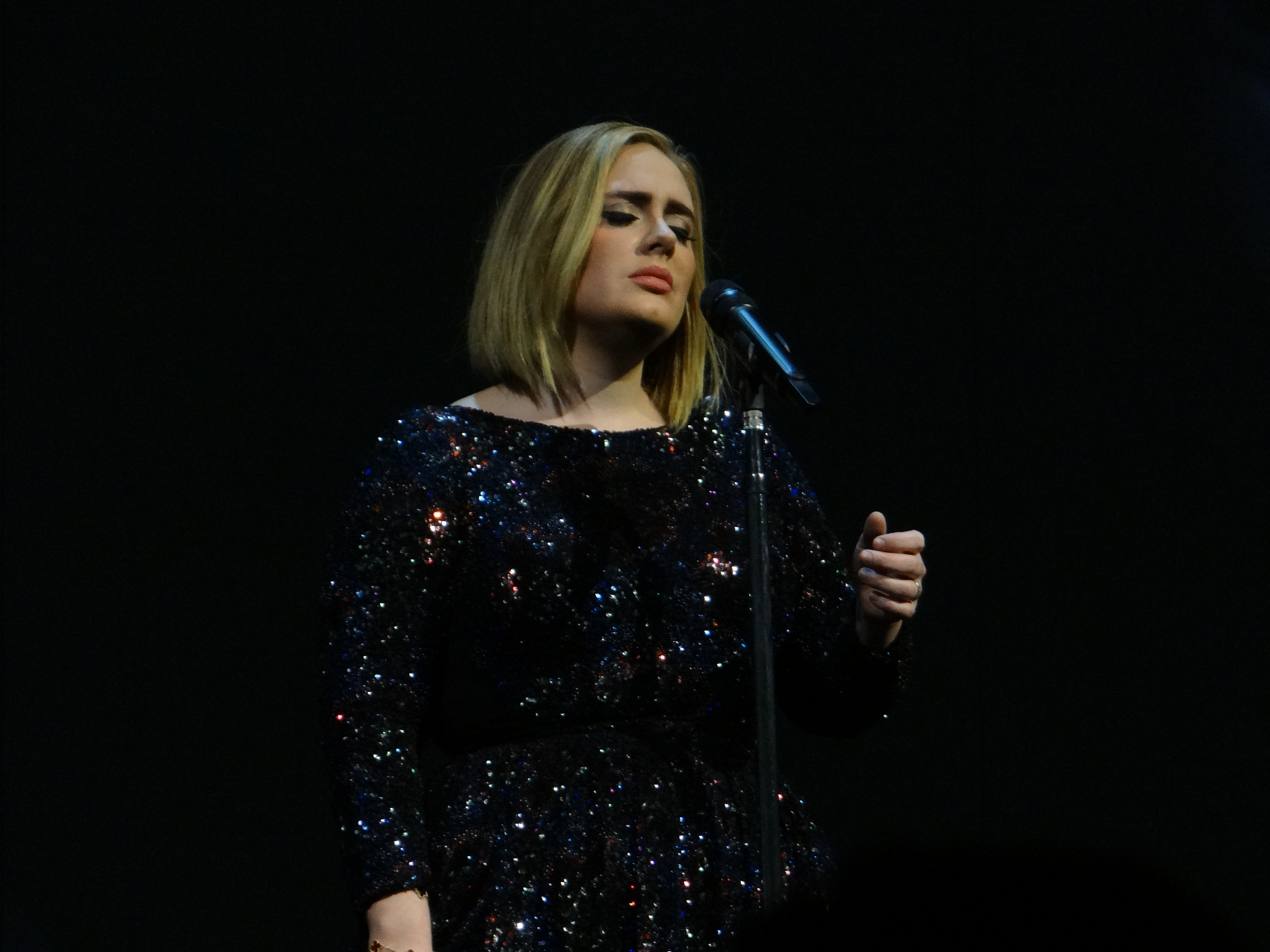
Adele has been selected to receive the award twice.

Year	Recipient(s)
2013	One Direction
2014	One Direction
2015	Sam Smith
2016	Adele
2017	Adele
2018	Ed Sheeran
2019	Ed Sheeran
2020	—N/a
2021	—N/a
2022	—N/a
2023	—N/a
2024	—N/a
2025	Sabrina Carpenter

== Artists with multiple wins ==
2 wins

- Adele
- Ed Sheeran
- One Direction
