= Lucia & the Best Boys =

Scottish indie rock band

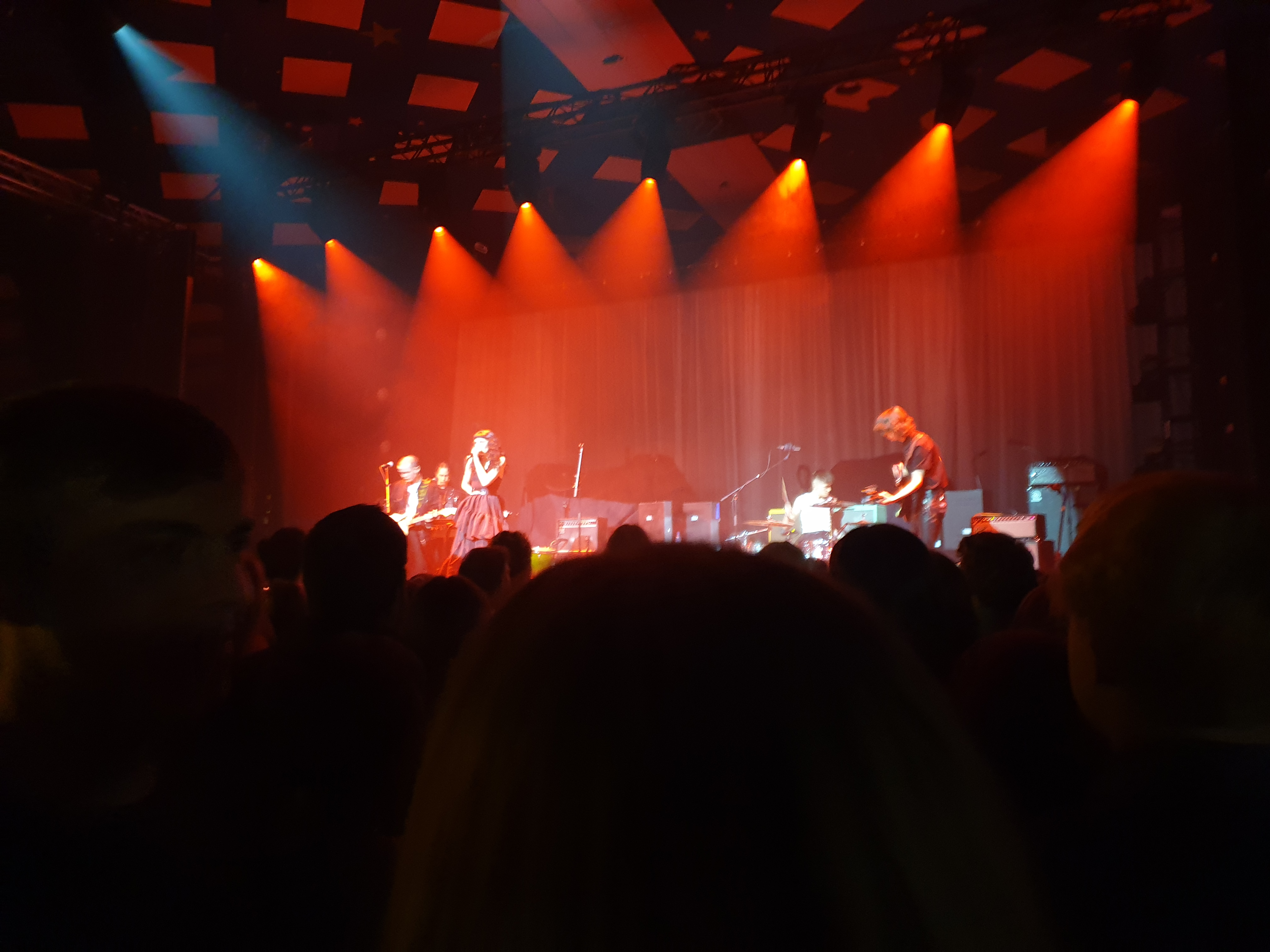
- Lucia & the Best Boys performing at the Barrowland Ballroom in Glasgow, 2022

Background information
- Origin: Glasgow, Scotland
- Genres: Indie rock
- Years active: 2017–present
- Label: Communion
- Members: Lucia Fairfull; Ally Scott; Christopher Ballantyne; Adam Campbell
- Website: luciaandthebestboys.co.uk

Lucia & the Best Boys are a Scottish indie rock band. The bands lineup consists of lead vocalist Lucia Fairfull, with Ally Scott, Christopher Ballantyne and Adam Campbell.

== Career ==
=== Formation and debut studio album ===
The band members met in Glasgow while performing in other bands. They were formerly known as Lucia and have been active since 2017. In 2023, they released their debut studio album Burning Castles, which peaked at No. 6 on the Scottish Albums Chart.

=== Garbage tour (2024) – present ===
The band supported the Scottish and American rock band Garbage during the European leg of their 2024 tour in all dates except in Italy, where Romina Falconi opened for Garbage.

In February of 2026, Lucia collaborated with Lauren Mayberry of Chvrches in making "Lonely Girl". In April 2026, the band released "You Look Like Somebody In Love" as a single for their album Picking Petals, scheduled to release on July 31, 2026. Later in 2026, they worked with the Last Dinner Party's Abigail Morris on the single "Big Romance".

== Discography ==
=== Studio albums ===
- Burning Castles (29 September 2023)
- Picking Petals (31 July 2026)

=== Extended plays ===
- Best Boy (2017)
- Cheap Talk (2 November 2018)
- Eternity (31 January 2020)
- The State of Things (9 October 2020)

=== Singles ===
- "Melted Ice Cream" (2017)
- "Blueheart" (February 2019)
- "Good Girls Do Bad Things" (October 2019)
- "City of Angels" (31 January 2020)
- "Let Go" (22 May 2020)
- "Perfectly Untrue" (September 2020)
- "Forever Forget" (January 2021)
- "When You Dress Up" (February 2023)
- "Burning Castles" (November 2023)
- "Favourite Thing to Lose" (December 2023)
- "Lonely Girl" (with Lauren Mayberry) (February 2026)
- "You Look Like Somebody In Love" (April 2026)
- "Big Romance" (with Abigail Morris) (May 2026)
