= Opening Night (song) =

Single by Arctic Monkeys

from the album Help(2)
- Released: 22 January 2026
- Recorded: November 2025
- Studio: Abbey Road
- Genre: Electronic; art rock; post-punk
- Length: 4:19
- Label: Domino; War Child
- Songwriter: Alex Turner
- Producers: James Ford; Loren Humphrey; Alex Turner

Arctic Monkeys singles chronology
"I Ain't Quite Where I Think I Am" (2022)	"Opening Night" (2026)

Music video
- "Opening Night" on YouTube

"Opening Night" is a song by English indie rock band Arctic Monkeys. It was released on 22 January 2026, through Domino Recording Company, in collaboration with charity organisation War Child. The track was written by lead singer Alex Turner and produced by frequent collaborator James Ford as well as Loren Humphrey and Turner. The song was recorded in a week in November 2025 at Abbey Road and served as the lead single for War Child's 2026 charity album Help(2).

== Background and recording ==
In late 2024, the band joined the project at the behest of frequent collaborator and producer James Ford. Of the collaboration drummer Matt Helders said: "Anything James touches turns to gold, if he's putting something together, we know it's going to be for the right reasons, and also be a good-quality thing, as well." The song they chose for the project was an unfinished demo that Turner had first composed a decade ago, during their recording sessions at Rancho De La Luna in Joshua Tree for AM (2013). The demo contained the music and lyrics of what would become the song's chorus, although Turner wrote a new verse and was convinced by James Ford to add a middle eight. In late November 2025, the band met at Abbey Road Studios, to re-record the song, marking the first time the band worked together since 2022.

It has been described as an electronic, art rock and post-punk track and has been compared to the works of Depeche Mode, Nine Inch Nails, early the Cure, Nick Cave, Siouxsie and the Banshees and with backing vocals reminiscent of Steely Dan.

== Release ==
In January 2026, multinational charity organisation War Child launched a new Instagram account titled "War Child Records", causing speculation into a new album featuring artists following the account, which included Arctic Monkeys. On 20 January, a single by the band was announced, an official collaboration with the charity, set for release two days later. The song was released that day, alongside an announcement of the corresponding War Child album, titled Help(2) as a nod to The Help Album (1995). The song is accompanied by a visualizer featuring a child running through a beach in slow motion, directed by filmmaker Jonathan Glazer.

== Critical reception ==
Professional ratings
Review scores
Source	Rating
Clash	7/10
NME	4/5 stars

NME's Rhian Daly described "Opening Night" as a "beautiful gift", gradually building over its runtime to "something gently stormy". Daly goes on to summarise the song as "interesting, enjoyable and for a mighty good cause". Andrew Sacher reviewed the song for BrooklynVegan, describing it as a "natural continuation" of the band's more recent evolution but also noting the presence of Matt Helders on the drums, an instrument that had less usage on Tranquility Base Hotel & Casino (2018) and The Car (2022). For Clash, Robin Murray wrote that Turner kept himself to familiar themes lyrically, but thought that while it had "moments of magic", it also could "be pretty daft – "ten years later" he murmurs at one point, before pointlessly adding "it's been a decade". In reviews of the album, Neil Yeung of AllMusic called the track an "slow-burning scorcher", while Dork 's Dan Harrison praised Opening Night as "their best song in years". Jonathan Dean of The Times also highlighted the track as one of the originals from the album that "bear repeat listening".

== Personnel ==
Personnel taken from War Child website.

Arctic Monkeys

- Alex Turner – vocals, drum machine
- Matt Helders – drums
- Nick O'Malley – bass guitar
- Jamie Cook – guitar

Additional musician

- Tom Rowley – guitar

Production

- James Ford – production, mixing
- Loren Humphrey – production, mixing
- Alex Turner – production
- Ed Farrell – engineering
- Seth Taylor – engineering
- Matt Colton – mastering

== Charts ==
Chart performance for "Opening Night"
Chart (2026)	Peak position
Belgium (Ultratop 50 Flanders)	35
Estonia Airplay (TopHit)	95
Ireland (IRMA)	37
Italy Airplay (EarOne)	84
Japan Hot Overseas (Billboard Japan)	15
Netherlands (Single Tip)	25
New Zealand Hot Singles (RMNZ)	5
Portugal (AFP)	102
UK Singles (Official Charts)	16
UK Indie (Official Charts)	4
US Hot Rock & Alternative Songs (Billboard)	36
