= Prelude to Ecstasy =

Studio album by the Last Dinner Party
- Released: 2 February 2024
- Genres: Baroque pop; indie pop; orchestral rock
- Length: 41:08
- Label: Island
- Producer: James Ford

The Last Dinner Party chronology
Prelude to Ecstasy (2024)	From the Pyre (2025)

Singles from Prelude to Ecstasy
- 1. "Nothing Matters" Released: 19 April 2023; 2. "Sinner" Released: 30 June 2023; 3. "My Lady of Mercy" Released: 9 October 2023; 4. "On Your Side" Released: 1 November 2023; 5. "Caesar on a TV Screen" Released: 4 January 2024; 6. "This Town Ain't Big Enough for Both of Us" Released: 28 August 2024

Prelude to Ecstasy is the debut studio album by the English indie rock band the Last Dinner Party, released on 2 February 2024 by Island Records. It was produced by James Ford, and includes the singles "Nothing Matters", "Sinner", "My Lady of Mercy", "On Your Side", and "Caesar on a TV Screen". The band toured the UK and Europe from January to July 2024 in support of the album.

The album received acclaim from critics and debuted at number one on the UK Albums Chart. It was the UK's biggest first week-selling debut album in nine years, since Communion by Years & Years. It received a nomination for the 2024 Mercury Prize.

== Background ==
A press release called the concept of ecstasy a "pendulum which swings between the extremes of human emotion, from the ecstasy of passion to the sublimity of pain" and one that "binds [the] album together". The band also stated that they "laid bare confessions directly from diary pages, and summoned an orchestra to bring our vision to life", calling it their "greatest honour and pride to present this offering to the world, it is everything we are".

== Singles ==
The band's debut single, "Nothing Matters", reached the top 10 of the US Adult Alternative Airplay chart in September 2023, and reached number 16 on the UK Singles Chart in February 2024.

== Critical reception ==
Professional ratings
Aggregate scores
Source	Rating
AnyDecentMusic?	8.3/10
Metacritic	84/100
Review scores
Source	Rating
AllMusic	4/5 stars
DIY	5/5 stars
Financial Times	4/5 stars
The Line of Best Fit	8/10
MusicOMH	5/5 stars
NME	4/5 stars
Pitchfork	6.5/10
Record Collector	5/5 stars
The Skinny	5/5 stars
Uncut	6/10

According to the review aggregator Metacritic, Prelude to Ecstasy received "universal acclaim" based on a weighted average score of 84 out of 100 from twenty-one critic scores. Uncut described it as "a rich saturnine, baroque-pop set full of romantic drama. Strings, piano and keyboard combine with multi-textured guitar in songs that, though engaging, tend toward the florid". John Earls of Record Collector wrote that "Prelude to Ecstasy inhabits its own world as magnificently as The Lexicon of Love or Dog Man Star in marrying its grandiose aims with massive tunes. ... There's not a weak moment in these 11 songs."

Sophie Williams of NME found the album to have "a melodic confidence throughout that's a rare find in a debut. The Last Dinner Party may have some reverence for their art-rock forebears (such as early Julia Holter or St Vincent), but also enough self-belief and magnetism to set them apart from what's come before", summarising it as "fantastic songs that are easy to embrace and return to". Reviewing the album for MusicOMH, David Murphy stated that the sound is "varied but invariably bold, gesturing camply towards a raft of classic pop styles" and that "the band always sound cohesive, not just a list of educated nods, the music impeccably arranged and with true depth to the writing".

DIY's Lisa Wright stated that Prelude to Ecstasy is "proof in an age of algorithms that a completely singular band can beat them all and come out on top without diminishing a shred of their vision". Ellie Robertson of The Skinny concluded that, "Whether you call it glam, goth, or grotesque, these writers are resurrecting a long lost art in popular music – using big sounds, with indulgent lyrics, crafting a listening experience so rich it borders on hedonism." Rolling Stone's David Browne opined that "there's no denying the way their blowsy, unrestrained songs knock you upside and down and leave you with a dizzying high", calling the "combined mood ... very post-lockdown".

Concluding his review for AllMusic, James Christopher Monger called the album "a remarkably assured set of bold-faced indie rock and maximalist goth pop teaming with earworm melodies, intelligent, darkly romantic lyrics, and thespian bluster". Sophia McDonald of The Line of Best Fit felt that "with classical references and themes of lust, revenge, and sorrow, this debut could be the soundtrack to a modern Shakespeare tragedy". Laura Snapes of Pitchfork wrote that it "channels baroque pop and prog of yore, yet for all its high drama, the results sometimes sound too carefully plotted and curiously professional", as "for songs that deal with the emotional violence meted out to women and queer people, there's not much mess in TLDP's proggy proficiency, the kind that glam originally stubbed its cigs out on".

=== Year-end lists ===
Select year-end rankings for Prelude to Ecstasy
Publication/critic	Accolade	Rank	Ref.
MOJO	The Best Albums Of 2024	46	
Time Out	The Best Albums of 2024	15	
Rough Trade UK	Albums of the Year 2024	5	

== Track listing ==
All tracks are written by Georgia Davies, Lizzie Mayland, Abigail Morris, Aurora Nishevci, and Emily Roberts. Tracks 2–5 and 8–11 co-written with Rhys Downing.

Prelude to Ecstasy track listing
No.	Title	Length
1.	"Prelude to Ecstasy"	1:36
2.	"Burn Alive"	3:21
3.	"Caesar on a TV Screen"	3:49
4.	"The Feminine Urge"	3:26
5.	"On Your Side"	4:27
6.	"Beautiful Boy"	3:47
7.	"Gjuha"	1:29
8.	"Sinner"	2:56
9.	"My Lady of Mercy"	2:55
10.	"Portrait of a Dead Girl"	4:57
11.	"Nothing Matters"	3:01
12.	"Mirror"	5:24
Total length:		41:08

Prelude to Ecstasy: Acoustics and Covers (includes entire Prelude to Ecstasy album along with nine bonus tracks)
No.	Title	Length
13.	"Caesar on a TV Screen (Acoustic)"	3:34
14.	"Sinner (Acoustic)"	3:14
15.	"My Lady of Mercy (Acoustic)"	2:58
16.	"Nothing Matters (Acoustic, Live from Studio Brussel)"	3:05
17.	"Mirror (Acoustic, Live from The Brudenell Social Club, Leeds)"	4:47
18.	"This Town Ain't Big Enough for Both of Us"	3:11
19.	"Up North (Live from Hebden Trades Club)"	3:31
20.	"Wicked Game (Live from Showbox Sodo, Seattle)"	3:39
21.	"Army Dreamers (Live from Studio Brussel)"	2:10
Total length:		30:09

== Prelude to Ecstasy: Acoustics and Covers ==
On 28 August 2024, the group released a cover of the Sparks song "This Town Ain't Big Enough for Both of Us", the lead single to Prelude to Ecstasy: Acoustics and Covers. The release contained the entire Prelude to Ecstasy album along with nine bonus tracks. These included live and acoustic versions of songs from the album along with live cover songs and "This Town Ain't Big Enough for Both of Us", recorded in studio. The album was released on limited edition amber colored vinyl through the band's website, CD, on streaming services and for digital download.

== Prelude to Ecstasy – A Short Film by the Last Dinner Party ==
In August 2024, the group announced the release of Prelude to Ecstasy – A Short Film by the Last Dinner Party, which was released on 12 September 2024. Fans could register for tickets to the premiere and could watch the film along with the band in Soho, London. The film was also released to YouTube the same day.

== Personnel ==
The Last Dinner Party

- Georgia Davies – bass guitar (all tracks), additional vocals (tracks 1, 4, 6–11)
- Lizzie Mayland – lead vocals (8), additional vocals (all tracks), guitar (except 7), flute (3, 6)
- Abigail Morris – lead vocals (except 7, 8), additional vocals (7, 8)
- Aurora Nishevci – lead vocals (7), additional vocals (1–2, 4, 6, 8–11), organ (1, 3–5, 7–12), piano (except 7), synthesizer (1–5, 8–12), conductor (2–4, 10, 12), string arrangement (11)
- Emily Roberts – guitar (all tracks), additional vocals (1, 4, 6, 8–11), flute (3, 6), mandolin (7)

Additional musicians

- Alex Marshall, Midori Jaeger – cello (tracks 1–4, 10, 12)
- Sam Becker – double bass (1–4, 12)
- Jenny Ames, Richard Jones, Zami Jalil – viola (1–4, 10, 12)
- Aleksandra Mansurova, Chihiro Ono, Emma Smith, Freya Goldmark, Lucy Wilkins, Paloma Deike, Phil Granell, Rosie Tompsett – violin (1–4, 10, 12)
- Pasha Mansurov – flute (1–3, 6, 12)
- Elsa Bradley – timpani (1–3), tubular bells (1, 5)
- Serafina Steer – harp (1, 3, 5, 11)
- Alistair Goodwin – bass trombone (1, 3, 8, 11–12)
- Robyn Blair – French horn (1, 3, 8, 11–12)
- Bradley Jones, Lucy Humphris – trumpet (1, 3, 8, 11–12)
- Chris Brewster – trombone (1, 3, 8)
- Ashley Myall – bassoon (1, 12)
- Rocío Bolaños – clarinet (1, 12)
- Philip Howarth – oboe (1, 12)
- James Ford – drums (except 3)
- Rebekah Rayner – drums (3)

Technical

- James Ford – production
- Chris Gehringer – mastering
- Alan Moulder – mixing
- Jimmy Robertson – engineering

== Charts ==
=== Weekly charts ===
Weekly chart performance for Prelude to Ecstasy
Chart (2024–2025)	Peak position
Australian Albums (ARIA)	35
Austrian Albums (Ö3 Austria)	9
Belgian Albums (Ultratop Flanders)	2
Belgian Albums (Ultratop Wallonia)	12
Dutch Albums (Album Top 100)	4
French Albums (SNEP)	107
German Albums (Offizielle Top 100)	15
Greek Albums (IFPI)	70
Irish Albums (Official Charts)	2
Portuguese Albums (AFP)	82
Scottish Albums (Official Charts)	1
Swiss Albums (Schweizer Hitparade)	10
UK Albums (Official Charts)	1

=== Year-end charts ===
Year-end chart performance for Prelude to Ecstasy
Chart (2024)	Position
Belgian Albums (Ultratop Flanders)	130
UK Albums (OCC)	83

== Certifications ==
Region	Certification	Certified units/sales
United Kingdom (BPI)	Gold	100,000^{‡}
^{‡} Sales+streaming figures based on certification alone.
