= The Last Dinner Party =

British alternative rock band

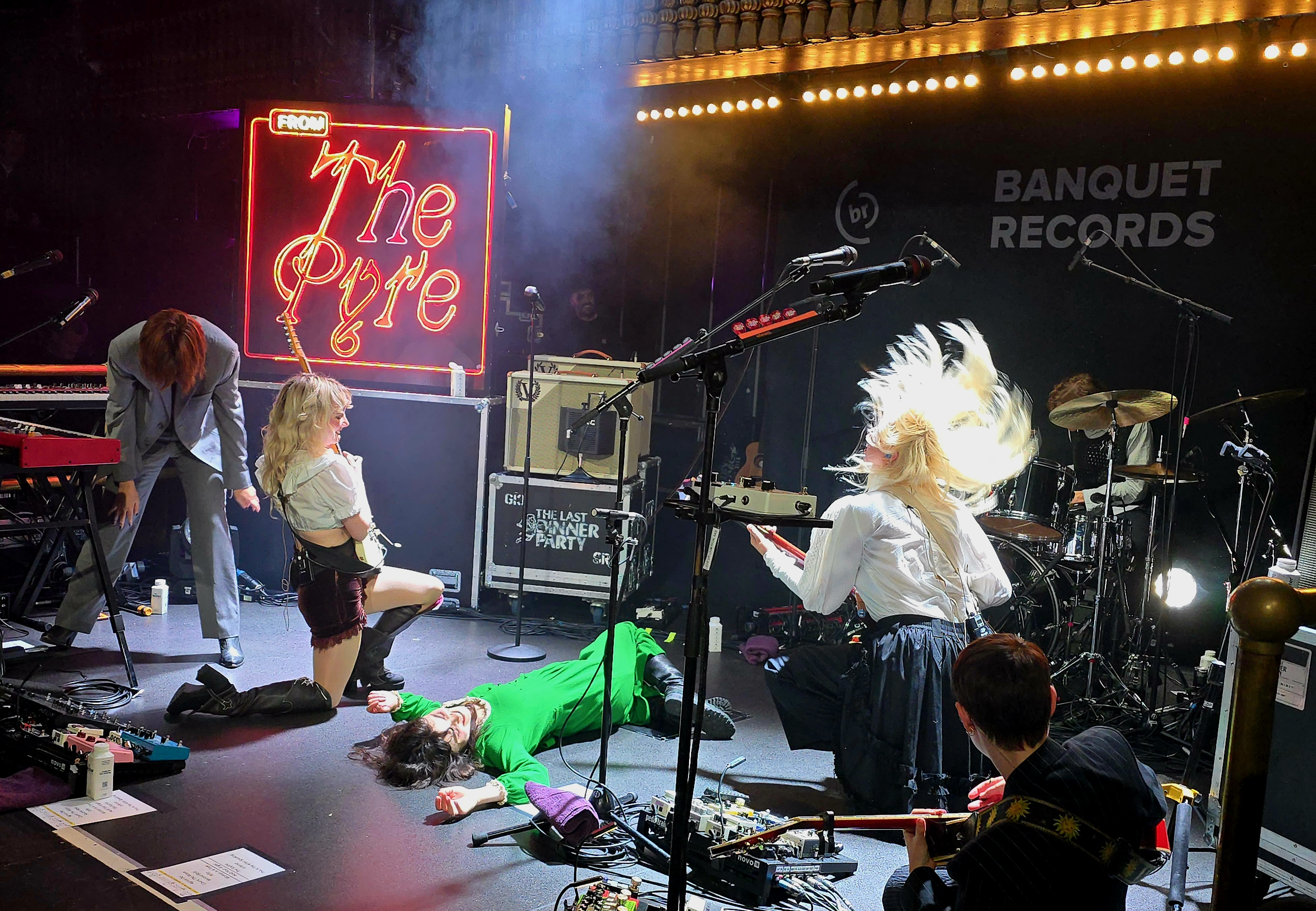
- The Last Dinner Party in 2025. L–R: Nishevci; Roberts; Morris; Davies; Mayland

Background information
- Also known as: The Dinner Party (2021–2023)
- Origin: London, England
- Genres: Baroque pop; art rock
- Years active: 2021–present
- Label: Island
- Members: Georgia Davies; Lizzie Mayland; Abigail Morris; Aurora Nishevci; Emily Roberts
- Website: thelastdinnerparty.co.uk

The Last Dinner Party are a British rock band from London, formed in 2021. The band consists of Abigail Morris (vocals), Lizzie Mayland (vocals, guitar), Emily Roberts (lead guitar, mandolin, flute), Georgia Davies (bass) and Aurora Nishevci (keyboards, vocals). They have no permanent drummer, and are currently joined for live performances by Dave Adsett and Luca Caruso.

The band signed with Island Records before releasing their debut single "Nothing Matters", a UK top-20 hit, in April 2023. They were awarded the Rising Star Brit Award in December 2023, subsequently winning the BBC Sound of 2024 poll. Their debut studio album, Prelude to Ecstasy, was released on 2 February 2024 and debuted at number one on the UK Albums Chart, recording the highest first-week sales for a debut album in over nine years. The album was subsequently nominated for the Mercury Prize. The group's second album, From the Pyre, was released on 17 October 2025 and charted at number two on the UK Albums Chart.

== History ==
=== 2018–2022: Formation and early years ===
Abigail Morris (from London), Georgia Davies (from Sydney, Australia) and Lizzie Mayland (from Hebden Bridge) met in 2018 during Freshers' Week at King's College London. They decided to form a band after frequently attending gigs together at The Windmill and feeling inspired by being part of the scene around the venue with bands such as Black Midi and HMLTD. Their original name, the Dinner Party, was "inspired by the idea of a huge debauched dinner party where people came together to celebrate with a hedonistic banquet".

Emily Roberts was recommended to Morris as a guitarist by a mutual friend and Nishevci was brought in. Roberts and Nishevci attended the Guildhall School of Music and Drama.

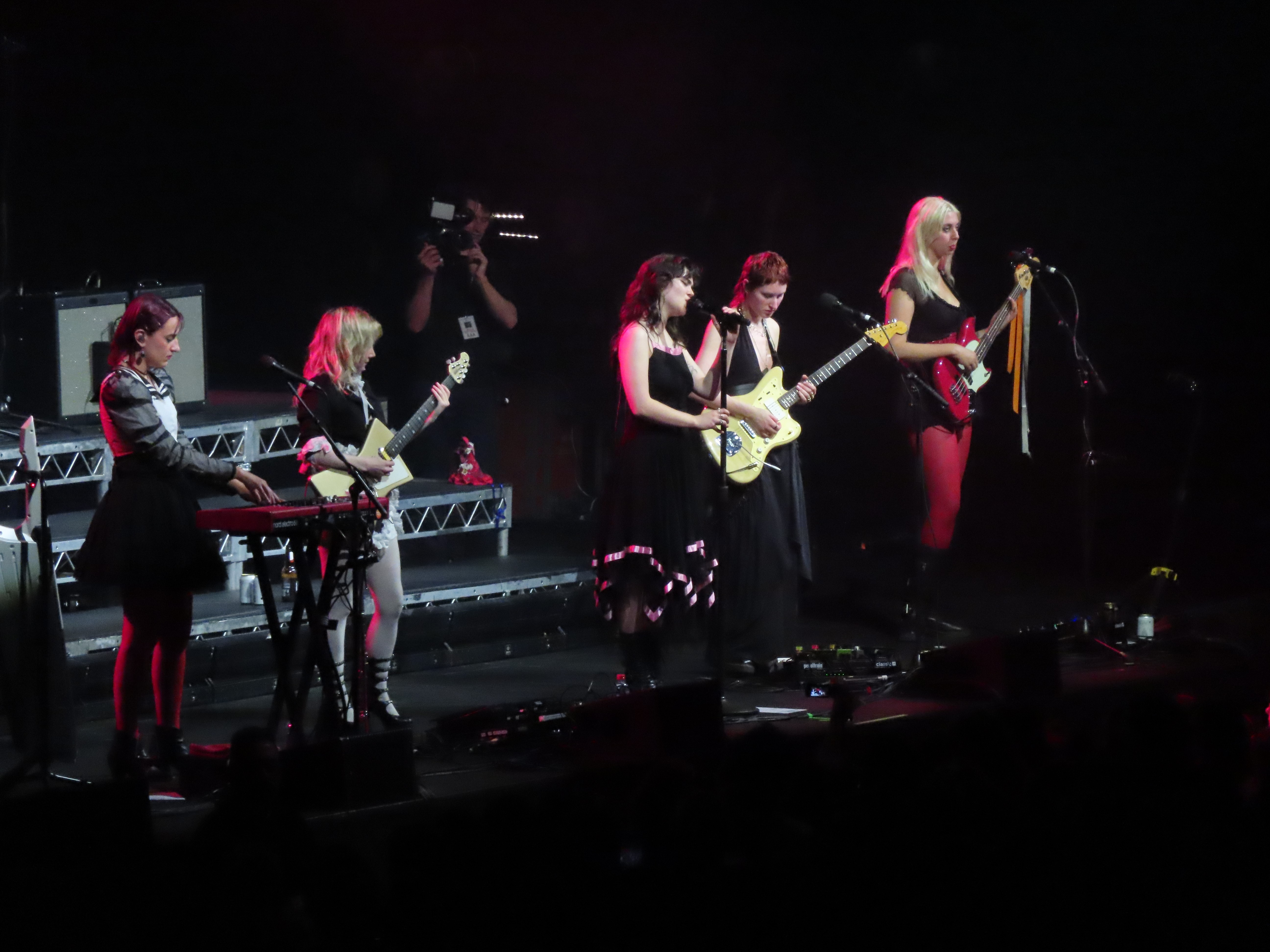
The group performing at Festival Hall in Melbourne in July 2024

The band initially struggled to find time to rehearse together because of the COVID-19 lockdown in the UK, and they did not perform live until their first gig at The George in London in November 2021. They signed with management group Q Prime in early 2022. They spent the following year honing their sound and building word-of-mouth support on the live circuit in London, including playing a set as the opening act (while still called the Dinner Party) for the Rolling Stones in Hyde Park in July 2022, and supported Benee on her world tour for the London show.

=== 2023–2024: Signing to Island Records and Prelude to Ecstasy ===
After signing with Island Records as the Last Dinner Party, to avoid confusion with the jazz supergroup Dinner Party, they released their debut single "Nothing Matters", produced by James Ford, on 19 April 2023. The song was later used as part of the soundtrack for EA Sports FC 24. During the summer of 2023 the band supported Hozier and played festivals in the UK, Ireland and Europe, including Glastonbury and Latitude. They were also invited to play a live session on the BBC Radio 6 Music show, New Music Fix Friday. The band opened for First Aid Kit on three of their UK dates in August 2023, including Liverpool.

After releasing two more Ford-produced singles, "Sinner" and "My Lady of Mercy", they made their first appearance on the BBC show Later... with Jools Holland on 21 October 2023 performing "Nothing Matters" and "My Lady of Mercy". On 1 November, the band officially announced their debut album Prelude to Ecstasy with the release date of 2 February 2024, and another single "On Your Side", followed later by "Caesar on a TV Screen" in January. Prelude to Ecstasy debuted at number one on the UK Albums Chart, becoming the biggest-first-week-selling debut album in over nine years.

In January 2024, they performed on the BBC's The Graham Norton Show. They were the winners of the BRITs Rising Star award at the Brit Awards 2024. On 28 August, they announced Prelude to Ecstasy: Acoustics and Covers, which features the original Prelude to Ecstasy album with five live and acoustic versions and four cover songs performed live and in studio. With its announcement, it was led with the single "This Town Ain't Big Enough for Both of Us", a cover of the Sparks song.

The album was subsequently nominated for the Mercury Prize.

On 9 May 2025, Lizzie Mayland released their debut solo EP, The Slow Fire of Sleep, under the name L Mayland.

=== 2025–present: From the Pyre ===
On 17 July 2025 the group revealed "This Is the Killer Speaking", the lead single from their second studio album From the Pyre, which was scheduled to be released on 17 October. The song had previously debuted live in June 2024 at the Metronome Festival in Prague. They had initially begun to work on the album with James Ford, who produced Prelude to Ecstasy, but Ford decided to leave upon his diagnosis with leukaemia the following year. By August, Markus Dravs had replaced him to produce. The album was also preceded by three more singles, "The Scythe", "Second Best" and "Count the Ways".

On 23 August 2025, the Last Dinner Party were due to play Victorious Festival. They pulled out after an incident the previous day in which Irish folk band the Mary Wallopers had their set cut off after they brought out a Palestinian flag. In a statement on Instagram, the band wrote: "As a band we cannot cosign political censorship and will therefore be boycotting the festival today".

On 16 February 2026, the group released the song "Let's Do It Again!", which was featured on the Help(2) charity album released on 6 March 2026 to benefit War Child. The album will raise funds and awareness for young people whose lives have been affected by war and conflict.

On 1 April 2026, Georgia Davies announced on social media that she had suffered a serious fall which resulted in a broken back needing immediate treatment. Due to her injury, she confirmed that she would be forced to miss the group's 2026 tour. The group's bass technician, Max Lilley, filled in for Davies while she recovered.

The group released a two-song 7" vinyl, The Scythe (Live From the Pyre), for Record Store Day on 18 April 2026.

== Musical style ==
"Nothing Matters" was described as "art-rock bombast" by Rolling Stone UK, while the Evening Standard and The Guardian described their look and sound as baroque pop with a Babyshambles twist.

The band have been compared to David Bowie, Fleetwood Mac, Kate Bush, Siouxsie and the Banshees, Sparks, Roxy Music, ABBA, Queen, Florence and the Machine and Warpaint. The band's members have cited Queen, St. Vincent, Chappell Roan, and Lana Del Rey as influences.

== Members ==
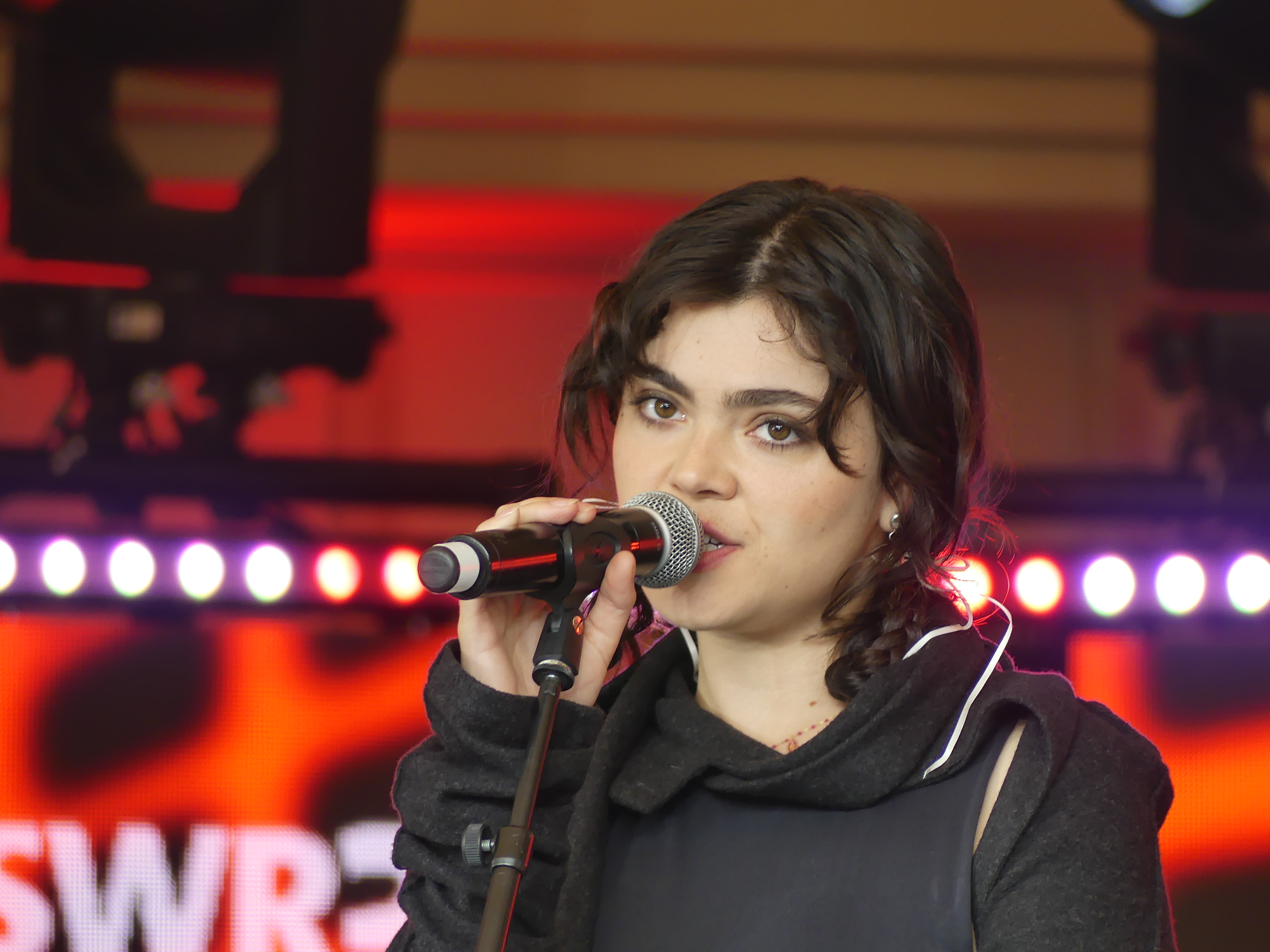
Abigail Morris

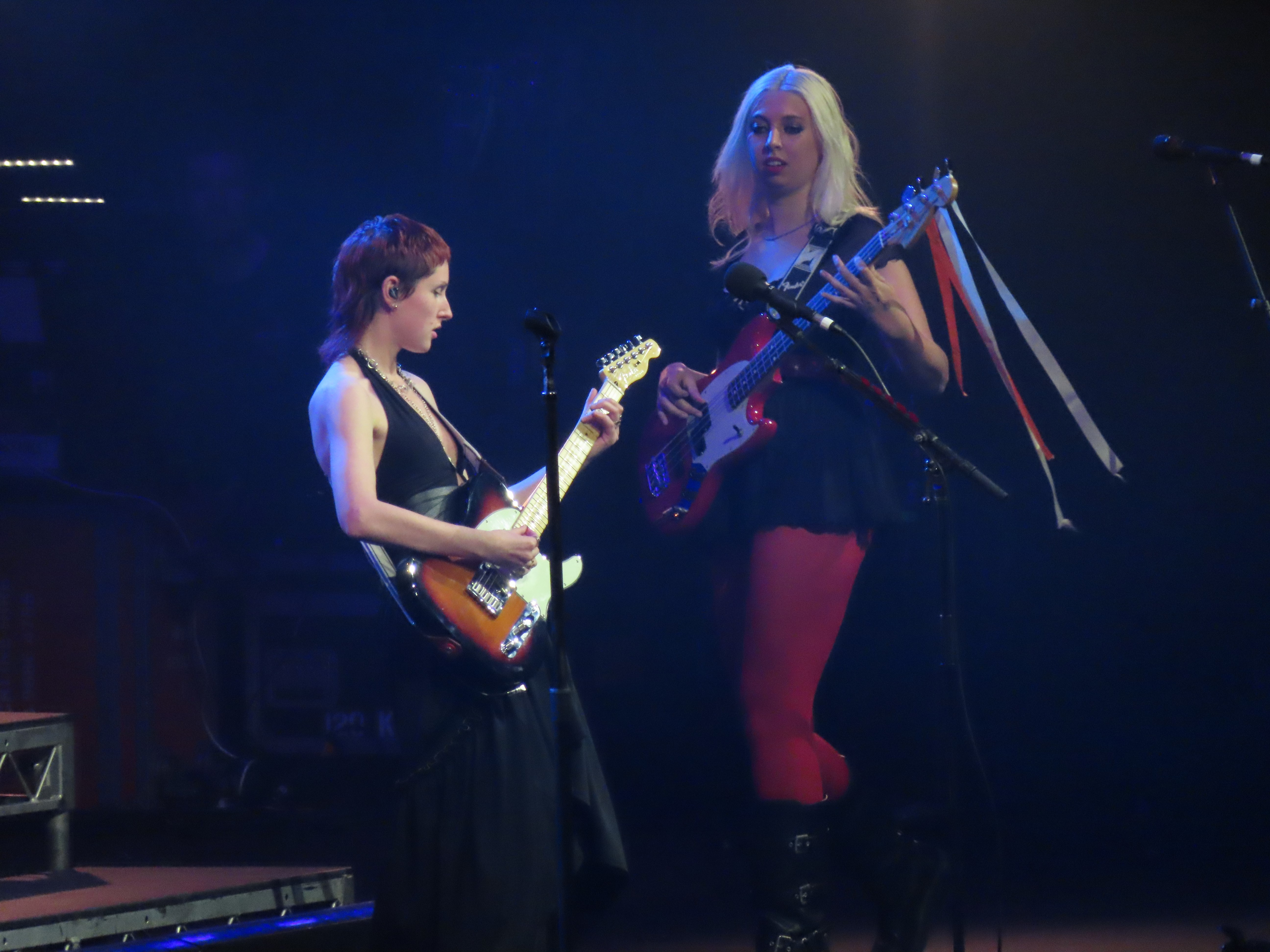
Lizzie Mayland (L) and Georgia Davies (R)

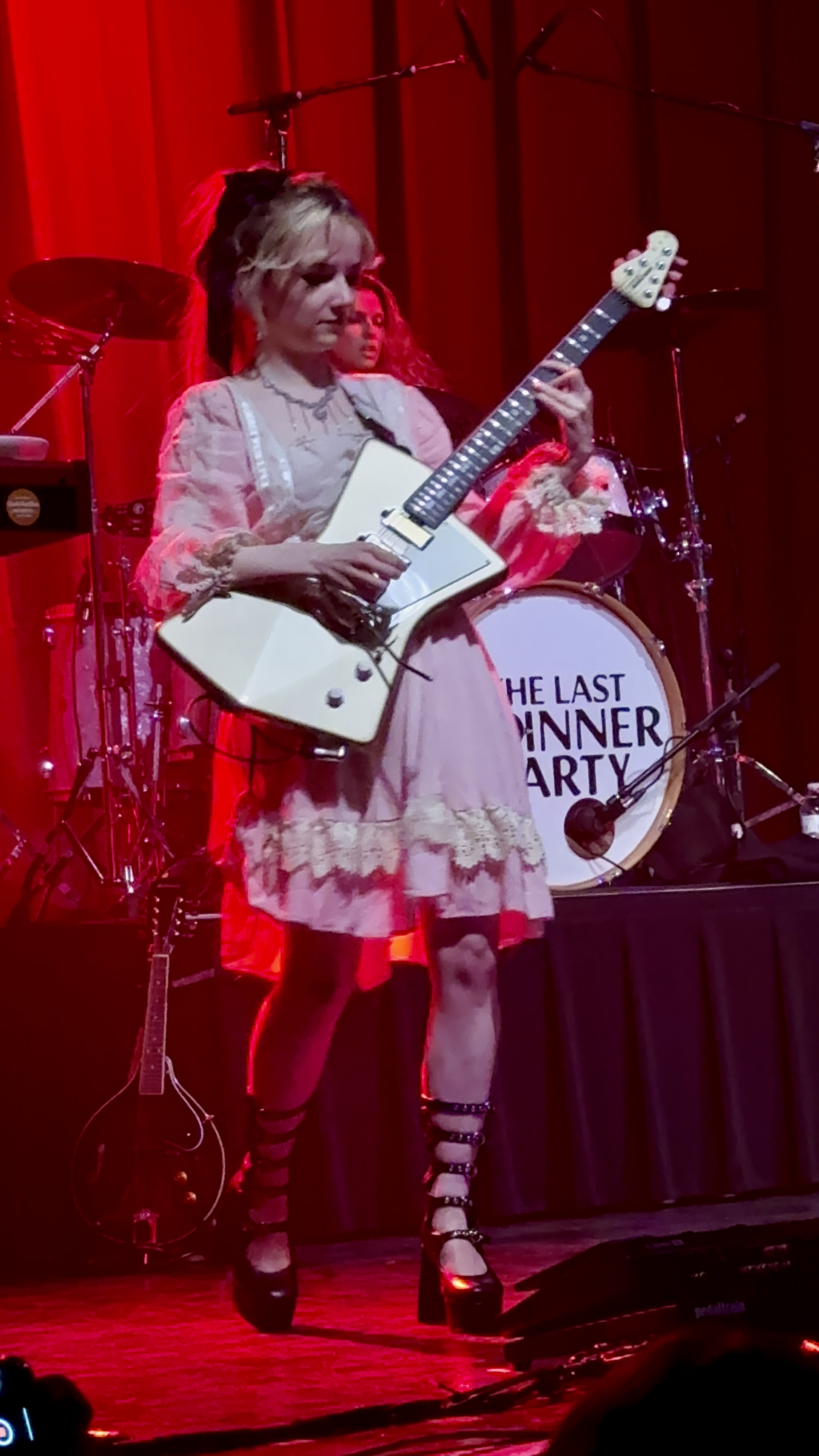
Emily Roberts

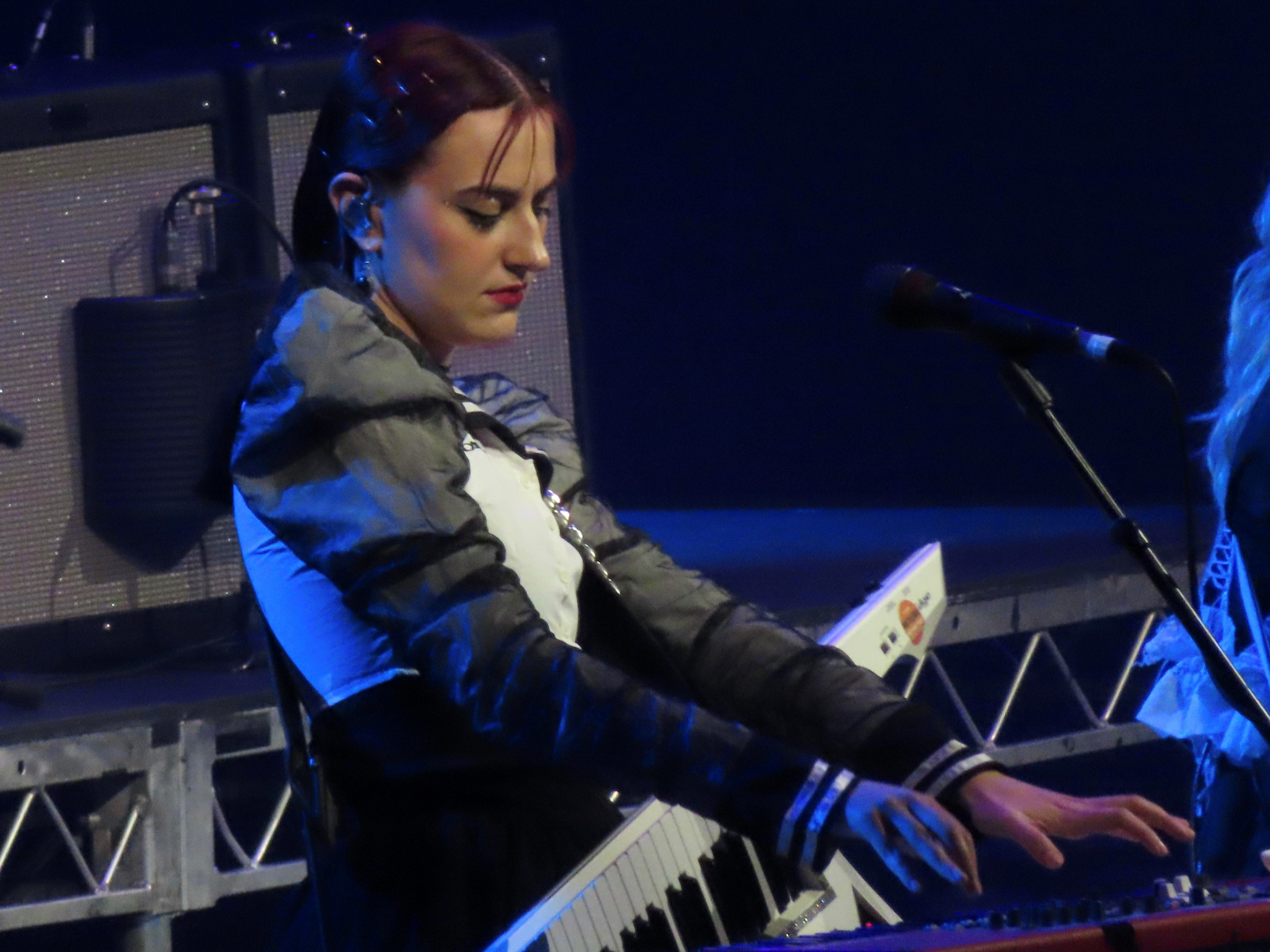
Aurora Nishevci

Georgia Davies – bass guitar, backing vocals
Georgia Davies was born on 6 May 1999, in Canberra, Australia. She grew up in Sydney's Northern Beaches, where she lived with her two younger brothers. Her early exposure to music began with piano lessons, but after watching Wayne's World, Davies became interested in the bass guitar. She was particularly drawn to the bass player's role in the rhythm section. In her teenage years, Davies performed with her brothers in a local band, entering high school talent shows together. She later moved to England to study literature at King's College London, while also attending gigs. Until 2018, Davies played bass and provided backing vocals for "Subterraneans", a band she joined while attending college. The group performed together until their last gig in early 2018.

Davies' professional music career began during her time at King's College, where she became friends with Abigail Morris and Lizzie Mayland, both fellow students. They regularly attended concerts together. Their friendship eventually led to the formation of the band which developed into The Last Dinner Party.

Davies' bass playing is heavily inspired by Peter Hook of Joy Division and New Order. Her father's love of these bands influenced her musical development. Beyond post-punk, Davies also brings a classical music influence. She also plays the piano on the Last Dinner Party's track "Prelude to Ecstasy".

Lizzie Mayland – rhythm guitar, flute, backing vocals

Mayland first met bandmates Georgia Davies and Abigail Morris during fresher's week at King’s College London. Although they initially enrolled there, Mayland later transferred to Goldsmiths, University of London, to pursue their passion for music. While at college, they contributed to the formation of the Dinner Party, which later evolved into The Last Dinner Party.

As a guitarist, Mayland draws inspiration from artists like Johnny Marr and Mac DeMarco. "This is The Killer Speaking" is one of their favourite songs to play on stage. Their background in art history also informs their approach.

Mayland also works as a soloist. On 9 May 2025, they released their debut solo EP The Slow Fire of Sleep under the name L.Mayland. Mayland's solo work is of a different style to their writing with The Last Dinner Party, including quiet sad songs and simple acoustic guitar. The music was written during quiet moments between tours with The Last Dinner Party, and is "very personal", coming "from a lot of lonely moments and quiet reflection."

Abigail Morris – lead vocals

In 2018, Morris began releasing music on SoundCloud under the name Amorina. Her streams also included an early demo of the future Prelude to Ecstasy track titled "Mirror".

In 2019, during Freshers' Week at King's College London, Morris met fellow students Lizzie Mayland and Georgia Davies. Together, they decided to start the band. A concert review by The Harvard Crimson praised her performance, noting "Morris's charismatic stage presence was engrossing as she danced around the stage before moving on to 'Caesar on a TV Screen'".

In addition to her work with The Last Dinner Party, Morris' other credits include providing backing vocals for HMLTD's second album, The Worm (2023). In 2025, she featured on BC Camplight's 2025 single "Two Legged Dog" from his seventh album, A Sober Conversation; the following year, she collaborated with Lucia & the Best Boys on their single "Big Romance".

Aurora Nishevci – keyboards, organ, piano, saxophone, synthesizer, keytar, backing vocals
In addition to her roles as an instrumentalist, Nishevci "conduct[s] all the orchestral arrangements."
In 2026, Nishevci and composer / arranger Nathan Durasamy formed a joint project Rora And The Untamed. Durasamy has previously assisted on arrangements for From The Pyre.

Emily Roberts – lead guitar, mandolin, flute, backing vocals

In The Last Dinner Party, Roberts plays lead guitar, mandolin, and flute, and contributes to song writing and backing vocals. In reviews of the band's debut album, Prelude to Ecstasy, Robert's guitar playing was described as "soaring, impressively stadium-ready axe heroics". Her live performances have also attracted positive reviews, with music critic Kitty Empire noting how Roberts "peels off rock solos with a Mona Lisa smile ... [and] precision and sangfroid". She normally plays a St. Vincent-signature Goldie from Music Man.

=== Current touring musicians ===
- Casper Miles – drums, percussion (2024–present) (Note: Miles has served as the band's primary live drummer since 2024; on dates or tours he is not available, several other drummers perform in his stead.)
- Luca Caruso – drums (2025–present; select shows and tours)
- Dave Adsett – drums (2025–present; select shows and tours)
- Amelia Lawn – keyboards, guitar (2026–present, substitute for Lizzie Mayland and Aurora Nishevci)

=== Former touring musicians ===
- Isis Dunthorne – drums, percussion (2023)
- Rebekah Rayner – drums, percussion (2023–2024)
- Daiana Azar – drums, percussion (2024)
- Victoria Smith – drums, percussion (2024–2025; substitute for Casper Miles)
- Max Lilley – bass (2026–present; substitute for Georgia Davies)

== Discography ==
=== Studio albums ===
List of albums, with selected chart positions
Title	Album details	Peak chart positions										Sales	Certifications
Title	Album details	UK	AUS	BEL	FRA	GER	IRE	NLD	SCO	SWI	US Heat.	Sales	Certifications
Prelude to Ecstasy	Released: 2 February 2024; Label: Island; Format: CD, LP, digital download	1	35	2	107	15	2	4	1	10	2	UK: 55,704	BPI: Gold
From the Pyre	Released: 17 October 2025; Label: Island; Format: CD, LP, digital download, cassette	2	7	8	61	9	12	6	1	14	*		
"—" denotes release that did not chart in that territory. "*" denotes a chart did not exist at that time.

=== Other releases ===
Year	Album details
2026	The Scythe (Live From the Pyre) (Record Store Day exclusive): Released: 18 April 2026; Label: Island; Format: 7" vinyl

=== Singles ===
List of singles, with selected chart positions
Title	Year	Peak chart positions										Certifications	Album
Title	Year	UK	CAN Rock	GER DL	IRE	JPN Over.	LTU Air.	LVA	NZ Hot	US AAA	US Rock	Certifications	Album
"Nothing Matters"	2023	16	21	27	22	—	65	17	34	5	35	BPI: Platinum; MC: Gold; RIAA: Gold; RMNZ: Gold	Prelude to Ecstasy
"Sinner"	2023	— (Note: "Sinner" did not enter the UK Singles Chart, but peaked at number 12 on the UK Singles Sales Chart Top 100.)	29	—	—	—	—	—	—	5	— (Note: "Sinner" did not enter the Hot Rock & Alternative Songs chart, but peaked at number 21 on the Rock & Alternative Airplay chart.)		Prelude to Ecstasy
"My Lady of Mercy"	2023	—	—	—	—	5	—	—	—	—	—		Prelude to Ecstasy
"On Your Side"	2023	—	—	—	—	—	—	—	—	—	—		Prelude to Ecstasy
"Caesar on a TV Screen"	2024	—	—	—	—	—	—	—	—	—	—		Prelude to Ecstasy
"This Town Ain't Big Enough for Both of Us"	2024	—	—	—	—	—	—	—	—	—	—		Prelude to Ecstasy: Acoustics and Covers
"This Is the Killer Speaking"	2025	—	—	—	—	—	—	—	—	17	— (Note: "This Is the Killer Speaking" did not enter the Hot Rock & Alternative Songs chart, but peaked at number 30 on the Rock & Alternative Airplay chart.)		From the Pyre
"The Scythe"	2025	— (Note: "The Scythe" did not enter the UK Singles Chart, but peaked at number 14 on the UK Singles Sales Chart Top 100.)	—	—	—	—	—	—	37	—	—		From the Pyre
"Second Best"	2025	—	—	—	—	6	—	—	—	—	—		From the Pyre
"Count the Ways"	2025	—	—	—	—	—	—	—	30	13	— (Note: "Count the Ways" did not enter the Hot Rock & Alternative Songs chart, but peaked at number 34 on the Rock & Alternative Airplay chart.)		From the Pyre
"Let's Do It Again!"	2026	—	—	—	—	—	—	—	—	—	—		Help(2)
"Big Dog"	2026	—	—	—	—	—	—	—	—	—	—		Non-album single
"—" denotes release that did not chart in that territory.

== Videography ==
=== Music videos ===
List of music videos
Title	Year	Director(s)
"Nothing Matters"	2023	Saorla Houston and the Last Dinner Party
"My Lady of Mercy"	2023	Harv Frost and Dora Paphides
"Sinner (Live)"	2023	Balan Evans and the Last Dinner Party
"On Your Side"	2023	Cal McIntyre
"On Your Side (Apple Music Sessions)"	2023	—
"Caesar on a TV Screen"	2024	Harv Frost
"Sinner (On the Road)"	2024	—
"The Feminine Urge"	2024	Harv Frost
"This Town Ain't Big Enough for Both of Us (On the Road)"	2024	—
"This Is the Killer Speaking"	2025	Harv Frost
"The Scythe"	2025	Fiona Jane Burgess
"Count the Ways"	2025	GRAJPER
"Sail Away"	2025	—
"Agnus Dei"	2025	—
"Let's Do It Again!" (Visualiser video)	2026	Jonathan Glazer

=== Prelude to Ecstasy – A Short Film by the Last Dinner Party ===
In August 2024, the group announced the release of their film, Prelude to Ecstasy – A Short Film by the Last Dinner Party, which was released on 12 September 2024. The film was directed by Harv Frost. Fans could register for tickets to the film's premiere in Soho, London, where they could view the film along with the band. The film was also released on YouTube that same day.

They continued to work with Frost, who later directed the video for "This Is the Killer Speaking", the first single from their 2025 album.

== Tours ==
=== Solo ===
The band's first tour was announced in June 2023; this was a 10-date UK tour scheduled for October 2023 starting in Blackpool Central Library as part of "Get It Loud In Libraries". This was followed by their first US tour, with five dates scheduled from 31 October to 9 November.

The band announced a second tour in November 2023 with eight dates throughout Europe in February 2024. They announced dates for the North American leg of the tour in January 2024 and UK and Ireland dates. The tour lasted from February until October. During this period, the band performed at Coachella in April, Primavera Sound Barcelona in May, and Primavera Sound Porto in June. Making their Australian debut, the band also performed at Spin Off Festival in Adelaide on 19 July. After this, they featured on Triple J radio's Like a Version, introducing the band to a wider Australian audience.

The band began their From The Pyre album launch shows on 15 October 2025 in Kingston, ending on 8 December at O2 Academy Brixton in London. In January 2026, they toured Australia and New Zealand, first appearing in Adelaide at the Adelaide Entertainment Centre Theatre on 13 January and finishing with Auckland, New Zealand, at Spark Arena on 22 January 2026. In 2026, they toured North America; they will support Sombr on tour in October 2026, and Olivia Rodrigo at the Los Angeles and Brooklyn dates of The Unraveled Tour in 2027.

=== Supporting ===
- Benee world tour (2022, one show)
- Florence and the Machine Dance Fever tour (2023, one show)
- Hozier Unreal Unearth tour (2023, 13 shows)
- Peter Doherty (2023, one show at The George Tavern)

== Awards and nominations ==
List of awards and nominations received by the Last Dinner Party
Award	Year	Category	Work	Result	Ref.
MTV Push	2023	MTV Push 2024	Themselves	Nominated	
Rolling Stone UK Awards	2023	Rising Star 2023	Themselves	Won	
BBC Sound of...	2024	Sound of 2024	Themselves	Won	
Brit Awards	2024	Rising Star	Themselves	Won	
Mercury Music Prize	2024	—N/a	Prelude to Ecstacy	Nominated	
Brit Awards	2025	Best New Artist	Themselves	Won	
Brit Awards	2025	British Group	Themselves	Nominated	
Brit Awards	2025	Alternative/Rock Act	Themselves	Nominated	
Brit Awards	2025	British Album	Prelude to Ecstacy	Nominated	
Brit Awards	2026	British Group	"Count The Ways"	Nominated	
Berlin Music Video Awards	2026	Best Art Direction	"Count The Ways"	Nominated	

=== Lists ===
Publication	List	Year (Note: Indicates the year of ceremony. Each year is linked to the article about the awards held that year, wherever possible.)	Song/Album	Rank	Ref.
Triple J	Hottest 100	2023	"Nothing Matters"	89	
Triple J	Hottest 100	2024	"The Feminine Urge"	78	
