= Abigail Morris (musician) =

British musician (born 1999)

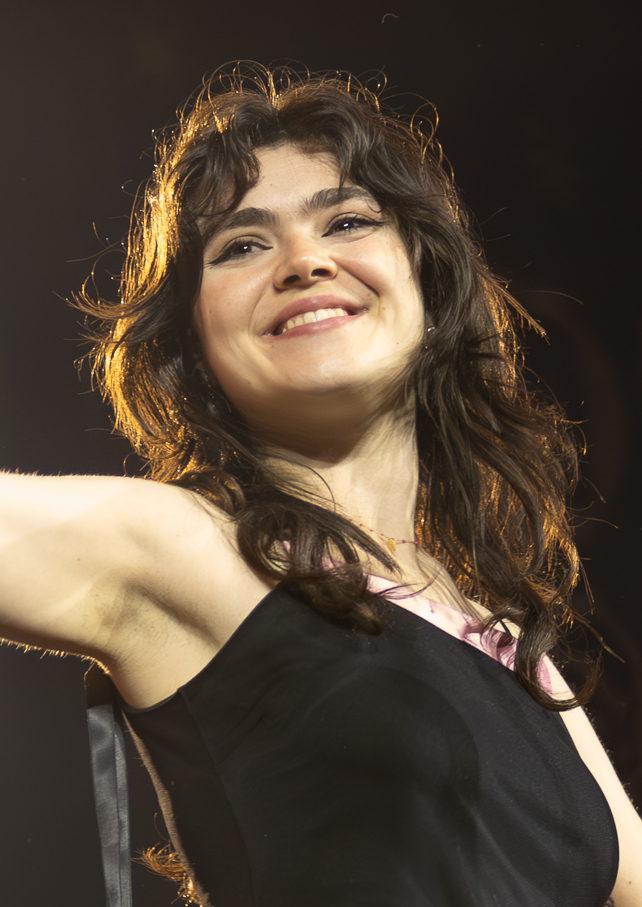
- Morris performing in Sydney, 2024

Background information
- Also known as: Amorina
- Born: Abigail Mary Eliza Kemp Morris; 19 October 1999 (age 27); London, England
- Occupation: Singer
- Instrument: Vocals
- Years active: 2020–present
- Member of: The Last Dinner Party

Abigail Mary Eliza Kemp Morris (born 19 October 1999) is an English musician and the lead vocalist for the indie rock band the Last Dinner Party.

== Early life ==
Abigail Mary Eliza Kemp Morris was born on 19 October 1999 in London, England. Morris grew up in London and attended boarding school at Bedales School in Hampshire. She then went on to study English at King's College London in 2019. Morris has been writing music since the age of thirteen.

== Career ==
In 2018, Morris began releasing music on SoundCloud under the name "Amorina". Her streams also included an early demo of the future Prelude to Ecstasy track titled "Mirror".

In 2019, during Freshers' Week at King's College London, Morris met fellow students Lizzie Mayland and Georgia Davies. Together, they decided to start a band. After being introduced to Emily Roberts and Aurora Nishevci, the group formed the indie rock band The Last Dinner Party. After a series of pub performances, the band performed their first gig at the George Tavern in London in November 2021, with Morris as the lead vocalist. Morris has cited Florence + the Machine, David Bowie, and Queen as some of her inspirations.

In addition to her work with The Last Dinner Party, Morris' other credits include providing backing vocals for HMLTD's second album, The Worm (2023). In 2025, she featured on BC Camplight's 2025 single "Two Legged Dog" from his seventh album, A Sober Conversation; the following year, she collaborated with Lucia & the Best Boys on their single "Big Romance".

== Musical style and influences ==
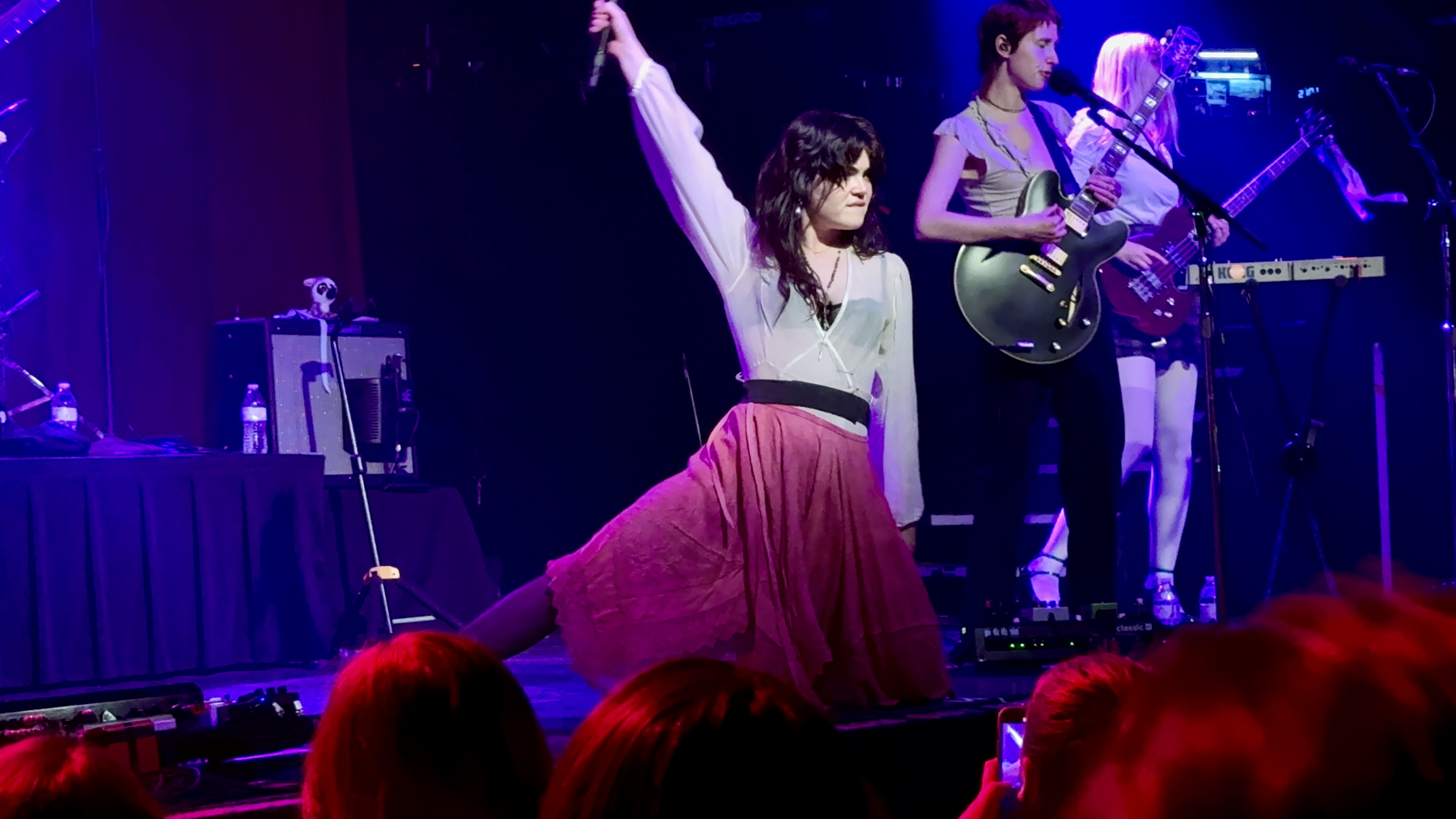
Morris on stage in Minneapolis, 2024

Discussing The Last Dinner Party, Morris told Vogue: "The visual world we create is so important to our music because the music will evolve constantly over time". In the same piece she cited the band's numerous musical inspirations, including David Bowie, Grace Jones, Weyes Blood, Hayley Williams and Pete Doherty; regarding their aesthetic inspirations, she cited Chloë Sevigny, Vivienne Westwood, Catholic imagery, and the 2016 film The Love Witch. Reviewing the band's debut album, Pitchfork wrote: "Prelude to Ecstasy spills over with baroque flourishes, ribboning woodwinds, and a theatrical sense of melodrama". A separate concert review by The Harvard Crimson praised Morris's stage presence, noting that "Morris's charismatic stage presence was engrossing as she danced around the stage before moving on to 'Caesar on a TV Screen'".

== Discography ==
=== With The Last Dinner Party ===
- Prelude to Ecstasy (2024)
- From the Pyre (2025)

=== As featured artist ===
- "Two Legged Dog" (BC Camplight featuring Abigail Morris)
- "Big Romance" (Lucia & the Best Boys with Abigail Morris)
