= Lizzie Mayland =

British indie rock musician

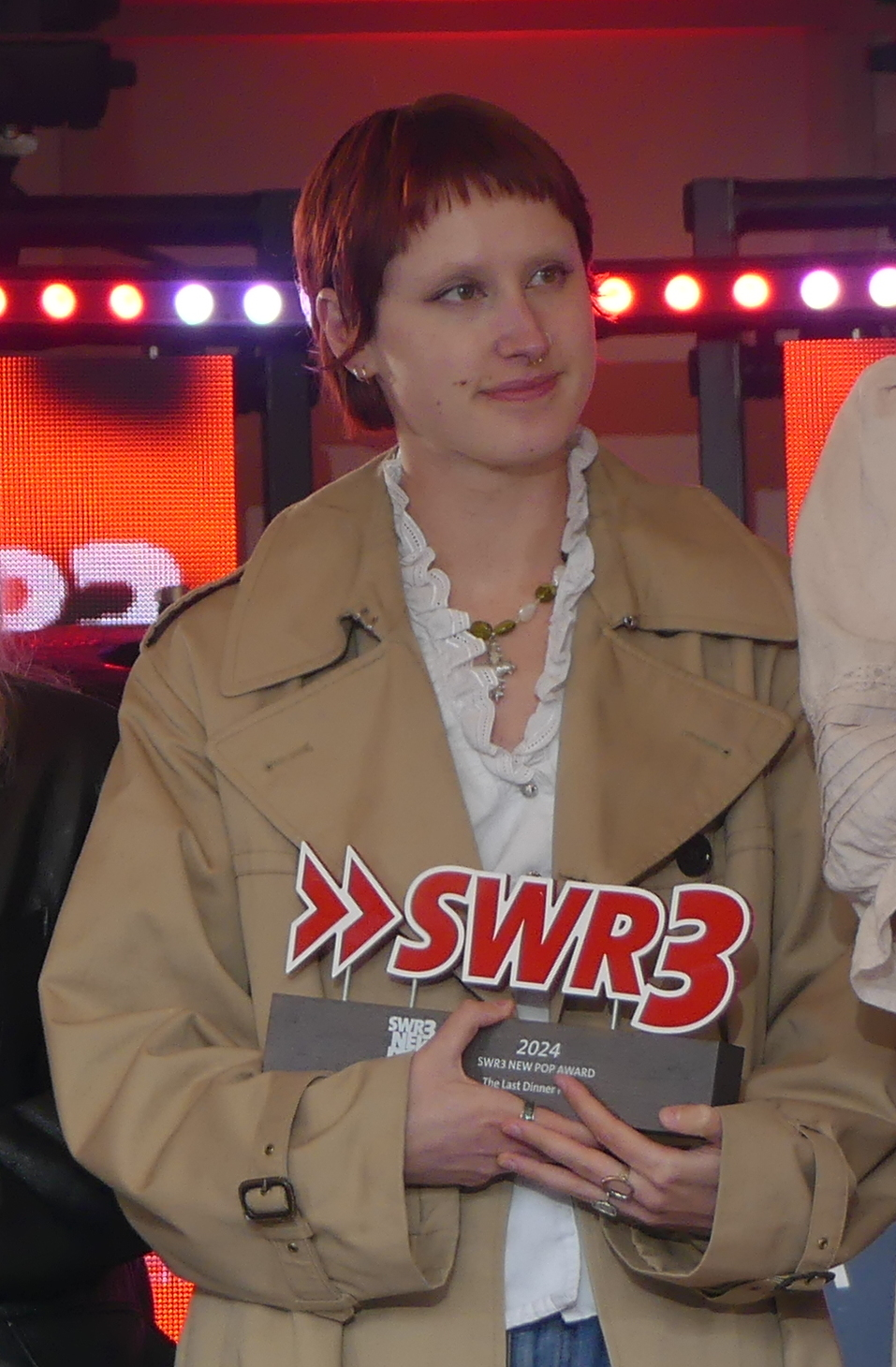
- Mayland in 2024

Background information
- Born: Elizabeth Louise Mayland; 31 January 1999 (age 27)
- Origin: Hebden Bridge, West Yorkshire, England
- Occupations: Guitarist; flautist; vocalist
- Years active: 2021–present
- Member of: The Last Dinner Party
- Website: thelastdinnerparty.co.uk

Elizabeth Louise Mayland (born 31 January 1999) is an English musician best known as the rhythm guitarist and vocalist for the Last Dinner Party. Additionally, they have pursued a solo career under the stage name L.Mayland. Their style is influenced by artists such as Amy Winehouse and Johnny Marr.

== Early life ==
Mayland was born on 31 January 1999, and grew up near Hebden Bridge in West Yorkshire. Raised in a Catholic family, they felt isolated during this upbringing; this became a theme that later influenced Mayland's songwriting, particularly in the song "Sinner." Mayland picked up the guitar after being inspired by Amy Winehouse, which coincided with the genesis of The Last Dinner Party.

== Career ==
Mayland first met bandmates Georgia Davies and Abigail Morris during fresher's week at King’s College London. Although they initially enrolled there, Mayland later transferred to Goldsmiths, University of London, to pursue their passion for music. While at college, they contributed to the formation of the Dinner Party, which later evolved into The Last Dinner Party.

As a guitarist, Mayland draws inspiration from artists like Johnny Marr and Mac DeMarco. "This is The Killer Speaking" is one of their favourite TLDP songs to play on stage. Their background in art history also informs their approach.

=== Solo work ===
On 9 May 2025, Mayland released their debut solo EP The Slow Fire of Sleep under the name L.Mayland. Mayland's solo work is of a different style to their writing with The Last Dinner Party, including quiet sad songs and simple acoustic guitar. The music was written during quiet moments between tours with The Last Dinner Party, and is "very personal", coming "from a lot of lonely moments and quiet reflection."

== Personal life ==
Mayland is non-binary and uses they/them pronouns.
