= Emily Roberts =

British guitarist and composer

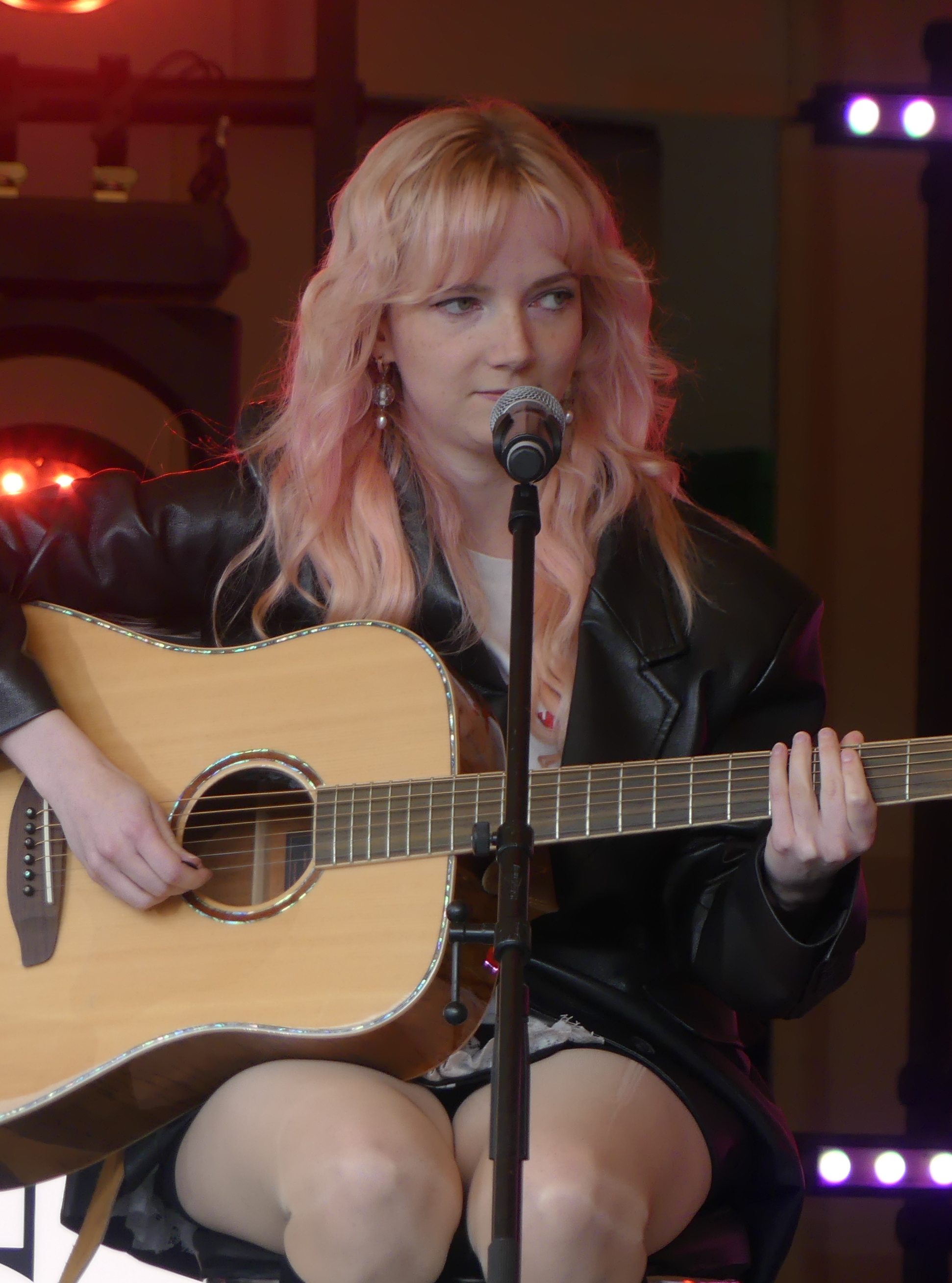
- Roberts performing in Germany, 2024

Background information
- Born: Emily Jane Roberts
- Origin: Chester, Cheshire, England
- Occupations: Guitarist; composer; producer; mandolinist; flautist; vocalist
- Years active: 2014–present
- Member of: The Last Dinner Party

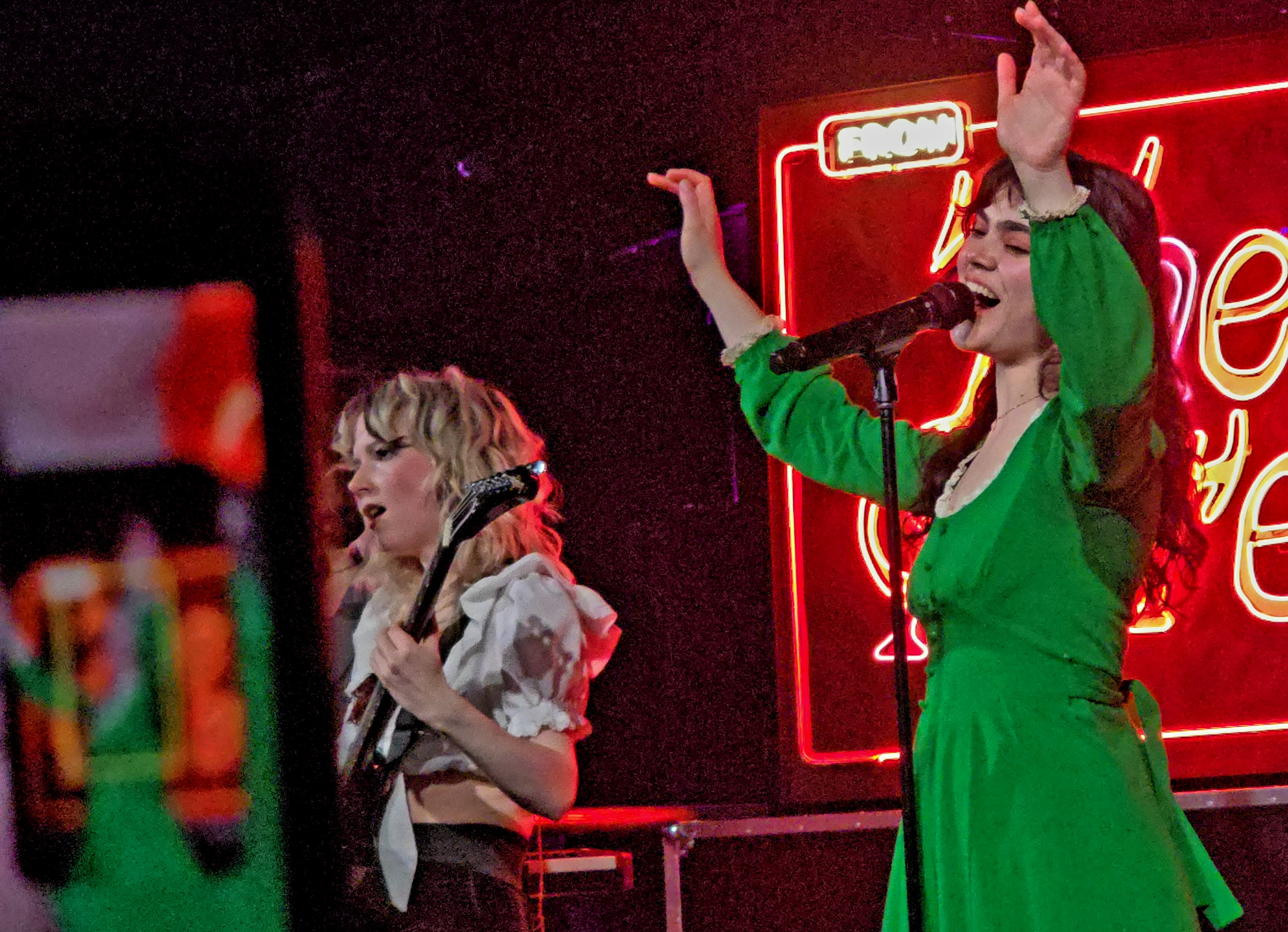
Roberts and Abigail Morris performing with The Last Dinner Party, 2025

Emily Jane Roberts is a British guitarist and composer. She is the lead guitarist of the indie rock band the Last Dinner Party, and has a background in jazz and classical music.

== Early life and education ==
Roberts grew up in Chester in Cheshire, North West England, and began playing guitar at the age of six; however, she found guitar lessons boring and quit. At age nine, she returned to the instrument, learning acoustic guitar from a local teacher.

She attended King's School, Macclesfield before moving to Manchester to attend Chetham's School of Music, where she studied both jazz and classical guitar. During her time there, she was a member of Chetham's Big Band and the Wigan Youth Jazz Orchestra. She later accepted a place in the BMus Jazz course at the Guildhall School of Music and Drama in London. Roberts was a semi-finalist in the BBC Young Jazz Musician competition in 2020.

== Career ==
Roberts's professional career began in 2014 when she joined the Creative Leadership Ensemble, a project focused on encouraging women in jazz. From 2016 to 2021, she performed with a variety of orchestras at the Royal Festival Hall, the Wigan International Jazz Festival, the Barbican Concert Hall, among others, and performed with Guildhall Jazz and the BBC Singers in a concert broadcast on BBC Radio 3. She gained experience in musical theatre by serving as the official electric guitar, mandolin, bass, and acoustic guitar understudy for the West End production of Our Ladies of Perpetual Succour at the Duke of York's Theatre in summer 2017.

Roberts toured with neofolk artist Blanco White in 2018 and performed with various artists across different genres, including London based indie pop band Pink Haze, and a Babyshambles cover band called "Ladyshambles." She joined a Queen tribute band called Fat Bottomed Girls in 2019. She attributes the time she spent that summer "trying to get inside Brian's playing" as a strong influence on her later style of playing. In the end, the tribute band only played live once, at a convention near Hull.

In 2021, Roberts began a song-writing collaboration with fellow musician Georgia Williams. As a duo, they called themselves Wednesday's Child, and released a debut five-track EP of the same name in 2021. In 2021 and 2024, Wednesday's Child featured on Tom Robinson's 'BBC Introducing' mixtapes featuring unsigned artists. This EP featured seven songs about seven women; all of which were composed jointly by Roberts and Williams. Tracks from this EP have been played on BBC radio, including "Theda" and "Paula" on BBC Radio London.

In 2022, Roberts released a solo jazz EP, The Persistence of Memory, which critics commended for its "exciting mix of styles ... jazz ... and soul", and for Robert's arrangements. The EP release was followed by live performances by Roberts at the annual London Jazz Festival, and tracks from the EP have had airplay on BBC Radio 3.

Roberts also played as a session guitarist for the musical Six, before joining The Last Dinner Party in 2022. In 2024, Roberts was one of the guests who performed on Sophie Ellis-Bextor's New Year's Eve Disco, which was broadcast on BBC One.

=== The Last Dinner Party ===
In The Last Dinner Party, Roberts plays lead guitar, mandolin, and flute, and contributes to song writing and backing vocals. In reviews of the band's debut album, Prelude to Ecstasy, Robert's guitar playing was described as "soaring, impressively stadium-ready axe heroics". Her live performances have also attracted positive reviews, with music critic Kitty Empire noting how Roberts "peels off rock solos with a Mona Lisa smile ... [and] precision and sangfroid". She normally plays a St. Vincent-signature Goldie from Music Man.

== Discography ==
=== EP ===
Release date	Artist	Title	Label
2021	Wednesday's Child	Wednesday's Child	
8 July 2022	Emily Jane Roberts	The Persistence of Memory	BridgeTheGap
2024	Wednesday's Child	Seven Sisters	

=== Track listing, The Persistence of Memory EP ===
- "I'll Tell You How the Sun Rose"
- "The Persistence of Memory", featuring Alice McCarthy
- "Mean Time"
- "Welcome to a Prayer"
- "Relaxing at the Underbelly"
