= Baker–Miller pink =

Color

Baker–Miller Pink

Color coordinates
- Hex triplet: #FF91AF
- sRGB^{B} (r, g, b): (255, 145, 175)
- HSV (h, s, v): (344°, 43%, 100%)
- CIELCh_{uv} (L, C, h): (73, 71, 356°)
- Source: Byrne (2003)
- ISCC–NBS descriptor: Strong purplish pink
- B: Normalized to [0–255] (byte)

Baker–Miller Pink, also known as P-618, Schauss pink, or Drunk-Tank Pink, is a tone of pink which has been observed to temporarily reduce hostile, violent, or aggressive behavior. It was originally created by mixing white indoor latex paint with red trim semi-gloss outdoor paint in a 1:8 ratio by volume.

Alexander Schauss, director of American Institute for Biosocial Research in Tacoma, Washington, did extensive research into the effects of the color on emotions at the Naval Correctional Facility in Seattle; he named it after the institute's directors, Baker and Miller. After Schauss' study, correctional facilities, sports team locker rooms, and artworks used Baker-Miller Pink to experiment with the observed effects. Across the U.S. and Europe, Baker-Miller Pink has been used to paint prison cells. As of 2015, 20% of prisons and police stations in Switzerland have at least one pink cell.

== History ==
In the late 1960s, Alexander Schauss, who now operates the American Institute for Biosocial Research in Tacoma, Washington, studied psychological and physiological responses to the color pink. Schauss had read studies by the Swiss psychiatrist Max Lüscher, who believed that color preferences provided clues about one's personality. Lüscher noticed that color preferences shifted according to psychological and physiological fluctuations in his patients. Lüscher asserted that color choice reflects emotional states. He theorized that one's color choices reflect corresponding changes in the endocrine system, which produces hormones. Schauss then postulated that the reverse might also be true; color might cause emotional and hormonal changes, and various wavelengths of light could trigger profound and measurable responses in the endocrine system.

In early tests in 1978, Schauss observed that color did affect muscle strength, either invigorating or enervating the subject, and even influenced the cardiovascular system. Schauss began to experiment on himself, with the help of his research assistant John Ott. He discovered that a particular shade of pink had the most profound effect. He labeled this tone of pink "P-618". Schauss noted that by merely staring at an 18 by 24 inches (46 cm × 61 cm) card printed with this color, especially after exercising, there would result "a marked effect on lowering the heart rate, pulse and respiration as compared to other colors."

In 1979, Schauss managed to convince the directors of a Naval correctional institute in Seattle to paint some prison confinement cells pink in order to examine the effects on prisoners. Schauss named the color after the Naval correctional institute directors, Baker and Miller.

At the correctional facility, the rates of assault before and after the interior was painted pink were monitored. According to the Navy's report, "Since the initiation of this procedure on 1 March 1979, there have been no incidents of erratic or hostile behavior during the initial phase of confinement." Only fifteen minutes of exposure ensured that the potential for violent or aggressive behavior fell, the report observed.

== Follow-up studies ==
Results of a controlled study by James E. Gilliam and David Unruh conflicted with Baker–Miller Pink's purported effect of lowering heart rate and strength. While the results of Schauss' study at the Naval correctional facility in Seattle showed that Baker–Miller pink had positive and calming effect on prisoners, when the same pink was employed at the main jail in Santa Clara County, California, the prison incident rate increased and even peaked compared to pre-pink months, despite a small decrease in the first month. Jail commander Lieut. Paul Becker found that the bright pink color calmed inmates after 15 minutes but had a reverse effect after 20 minutes. Some researchers believed the association of pink with femininity would be a bias in the results of Schauss' studies, citing the over-representation of male prisoners in the participants.

In 1987, Pamela Profusek and David Rainey of John Carroll University conducted a study observing if subjects would respond differently in a room painted red versus Baker-Miller Pink. Seven male and 39 female students were assigned to the two rooms, where they were tested for anxiety level, grip strength with a hand dynamometer, and motor precision with the board game Operation. While there were no significant differences among grip strength and motor precision, Profusek and Rainey found that participants in the pink room reported lower state-anxiety scores.

In 2014, Oliver Genschow and a team of psychologists at Ghent University wanted to re-test Schauss' hypothesis. 59 male prisoners who violated prison policies were randomly placed in pink or gray rooms. Officers were provided an aggression scale to examine behavior upon arrival and after three days. For both rooms, the prisoners showed reduced aggression after three days, but there were no differences based on room color.

=== Drunk Tank Pink ===
Adam Alter, NYU Assistant Professor of Marketing, published Drunk Tank Pink: And Other Unexpected Forces That Shape How We Feel, Think, and Behave examining how people are influenced by their environments, including the color of a room or how someone's name sounds. The book includes facts, anecdotes, and experiments providing explanations behind human behaviors and thoughts. Alter refers to Baker-Miller Pink, suggesting that a combination of physiological responses–the way pink interacts with our eyes–and societal associations with pink, like femininity, impacts behavior.

== Applications ==
=== Sports ===
In 1979, University of Iowa football coach Hayden Fry had the opposing team's locker room at Kinnick Stadium painted pink, which he noted was the color of little girls' bedrooms and thought would make the other team more passive. When the stadium was renovated in 2005, the university added more pink to the brick walls, urinals, showers, and lockers. Former University of Michigan head coach Bo Schembechler responded by ordering his team to cover the pink locker room in white paper.

The all-pink locker room received cultural criticism. Led by communications professor Kembrew McLeod, a "Million Robot March" brought together students and faculty who advocated for removing the pink locker room, claiming it was homophobic and sexist. Others supported the locker rooms as a tradition, with thousands of football fans wearing pink shirts adorned with defensive slogans advocating to keep the locker room color.

Norwich City F.C. painted their Carrow Road stadium's changing room pink, believing the calming effect of the color would lower testosterone levels. According to Dr. Alexander Latinjak, sports lecturer at the University of Suffolk, the specific shade of pink is associated with childhood experiences.

=== Art ===
Located in a former hospital in West Adams, CA, "Human Condition" is a site-specific exhibition, where artist Christopher Reynolds painted the cafeteria Baker-Miller Pink and called it The Schauss Kitchen. Reynolds drew from research conducted at Johns Hopkins Hospital in Baltimore, where the hospital's Health, Weight, and Stress clinic studied found that Baker-Miller pink had a stress-reducing effect on over a third of the tested subjects. Within the installation, all the cooking utensils were painted in Baker-Miller Pink, including a 800-page Cookbook meant to work against the audience's hunger. Reynolds also incorporated 18x24 inch pink mirrors to encourage self-reflection and a more direct interaction with Baker-Miller Pink. After her friends visited "Human Condition," American model and media personality Kendall Jenner posted on Instagram about painting her living room wall Baker-Miller pink, claiming she learned it was the only color proven to relax you and suppress your appetite.

At The Power Plant in Toronto, Canadian artist Kapwani Kiwanga explored how public architecture affects human behavior in her installation, "pink-blue." One half of the hallway exhibition is painted Baker-Miller pink, and the second half is a disorienting blue. Within the exhibit, Kiwanga showed her film, A primer, which focused on how color–including Baker-Miller Pink–is used to exert control.

British clothing brand Vollebak released a "Baker-Miller Pink Hoodie" to put wearers in a state of relaxation, especially for athletes entering high-endurance events. Vollebak's co-founder Steve Tidball cited tension and stress as major factors affecting sports performance. The hoodie zipped up to cover the face with small mesh breathing holes and included an in-built soundtrack of pink noise to slow the heart rate and a pair of "sling" pockets for wearers to slide their arms over their stomach to encourage deeper breathing.

In May 2018, Denver-based artist John Roemer unveiled a public installation, Baker-Miller Pink, outside of the Buell Theater as part of British artist Stuart Semple's installation project, "Happy City: Art for the People." The Baker-Miller Pink color spans three monochromatic panels to investigate if the color has a positive impact on public space by providing a visual break from an environment populated with signage and imagery.

=== Music ===
In 2018, the British post-punk band Shame recorded Drunk Tank Pink, an album about internal conflict and isolation. Band member Charlie Steen mentioned many of the lyrics were inspired by the thoughts he has right before he's about to sleep. After touring in Paris, Steen had to find a place to live in London–he wound up in an old nursing home and converted a laundry room into his bedroom, which he covered floor to ceiling in Baker-Miller Pink. Steen mentioned the band was unaware of the psychological experiment behind Drunk Tank Pink, but it all tied together with the album's meaning and his bedroom color.

Austrian musician Sofie Royer took inspiration from Schauss' experiment in her song, "Baker Miller Pink," released June 22, 2022. When discussing her lyrics and the song's meaning, the artist references Baker-Miller's Pink observed effect on reducing hostile behavior. Royer said the song protests the sedating, indoctrinating effects of consumer culture.

=== Food ===
In 2014, Dave and Meghan Miller opened their breakfast and brunch bakery, Baker Miller Bakery and Millhouse, where they incorporated Baker-Miller pink into its interior design and menu items, such as watermelon radishes on their avocado toast, pink-frosted donuts, and coffee labels. In 2023, the couple turned their bakery into a bagel deli called Bagel Miller, keeping its Baker-Miller pink patio and seating.

== See also ==
- List of colors
- Shades of pink
- Shades of magenta
- Color psychology
