= Color theory (disambiguation) =

Color theory are principles around the use of color in visual arts.

It may also refer to:

- Color Theory, an album by musician Soccer Mommy
- Theory of Colours, a book by Johann Wolfgang von Goethe

== See also ==
- Lüscher color test, a theory by Max Lüscher
