= Precious Okoyomon =

Nigerian-American artist, poet, and chef (born 1993)

- Born: 1993 (age 32–33); London, England
- Known for: Conceptual art, poetry
- Notable work: Earthseed, Ajebota, A Drop of Sun Under the Earth

Precious Okoyomon (born 1993) is a Nigerian-American artist, poet, and chef. They live and work in New York City.

== Early life and education ==
Okoyomon was born in London, England in 1993. At age eleven, they moved to Cincinnati, Ohio. Okoyomon attended the Shimer College in Chicago where they studied pataphysics, or the physics of the imagination. While still in college, Okoyomon worked at the three star Michelin restaurant Alinea for two years. For their thesis presentation at school, Okoyomon hosted a series of experimental dinners that featured dishes like rock soup, and had guests dine under hanging rope nooses.

== Work and career ==
Okoyomon's multidisciplinary practice investigates the racialization of the natural world, Christianity, intimacy, and ideas and experiences of life, death and time. Their installations, sculptures, performances, and poetry often draw from their family history as well as their encounters with queerness and the internet, and frequently return to figures like the angel, the sun, and trees as visual and conceptual motifs.

Okoyomon has had institutional solo exhibitions at the MMK in Frankfurt and the LUMA Westbau in Zurich, and group exhibitions at the Institute of Contemporary Arts in London, the Kunsthal Charlottenborg, and in 2018 were included in the 13th Baltic Triennial. Okoyomon participated in Hans Ulrich Obrist's 2018 Work Marathon, and has read their poetry at The Kitchen, The Studio Museum in Harlem, MoMA PS1, Hauser and Wirth, The KW Institute for Contemporary Art, Artists Space, and The Poetry Project, performing alongside Eileen Myles, Samuel Delany, and John Giorno. In 2019, Okoyomon was nominated for the Paulo Cunha E Silva Art Prize and was included in Cultured Magazine's "30 under 35" list of notable emerging artists. In 2021, Okoyomon received the Frieze Artist Award and produced a new Tower of Babel-themed commission for the Frieze New York fair.

=== Ajebota (2016) ===
Taking its title from a Youraba word meaning "spoiled rich kid," Okoyomon's first book of poetry, published by Bottlecap Press in 2016, explores the complexities of their identity as a black queer immigrant inhabiting a specific class position. The book which often makes use of internet shorthand and text abbreviation, frequently steals from the work of other poets, and ends with a poem composed of screenshots of a text conversation engages the challenges of writing and reading poetry in the digital age. The book which has been interpreted as a response to Alt Lit, cites Dana Ward, Hannah Black, Juliana Huxtable, Bhanu Kapil, Simone White, and Fred Moten among its many influences.

=== I Need Help (2018) ===
For Okoyomon's first art exhibition, they collaborated with Hannah Black at the New York Gallery Real Fine Arts on a sequel to Black's 2017 show "Some Context" commissioned by the Chisenhale Gallery in London, where Black filled the exhibition space with 20,000 copies of a book they produced entitled "The Situation" composed of interviews Black conducted with friends about a situation but where each explicit mention of what the situation is was redacted. In "I Need Help," as in "Some Context," many of the copies of the book were shredded. For Okoyomon's contribution to the show, they made a series of dolls consisting of raw wool bound by yarn. In a press release written by Okoyomon and Black, they propose that the exhibition "gestures towards a politics or aesthetics based on the underlying and frankly disgusting processes of rot and collapse that have produced the dirt from which everything grows.

=== Making Me Blush (2018) ===
In a two person exhibition at Quinn Harrelson / Current Projects, with the artist Puppies Puppies, Okoyomon presented their first large scale sculpture. In the piece, which re-stages the iconographic lynching trees of the American south, Okoyomon, hung a grouping of stuffed animals made to resemble angels, by the addition of taxidermied bird wings, from rope nooses attached to the limbs of a large live tree planted in a mound of soil. Conflating an esoteric Christian interpretation of an angel as a creature without life and without death, and theories of social death and slavery in the black radical tradition, Okoyomon constructed an artwork that models a complex notion of black life, by contrasting the physical impossibility of killing an angel from hanging, because the winged creature can always fly upwards to escape the pull of gravity, with the conceptual impossibility of living a life where one always has to fly just to stay alive. Okoyomon suggests that "black life is a mere mobilization of death." In an interview with Okoyomon at the 2019 DLD Conference in Munich, Hans Ulrich Obrist called the exhibition "an absolute highlight of 2018." Okoyomon's work from the exhibition is now included in the permanent collection of the Rubell Museum.

=== A Drop of Sun Under the Earth (2019) ===
Okoyomon's first institutional solo exhibition mounted at the LUMA Westbau in Zurich in collaboration with The Serpentine Galleries in 2019, curated by Fredi Fischli and Niels Olsen, continued the artist's exploration of history of the intersection of race and ideas about nature, light, life and death, and architecture. The show, building upon gestures first made in Making Me Blush the previous year, presents a forest of the artist's lynching tree sculptures in the museum's Heimo Zobernig designed schwarzescafé space. In an installation piece entitled "Frenzied Sun," Okoyomon created a machine that uses the gallery's air conditioning system to circulate cotton and cottonwood seeds through the space like snow. The show includes Okoyomon's first video work entitled "It's Disassociating Season," which was projected in the space and played on loop. Running for nine and a half minutes, the single channel video follows an animated bear smoking a blunt in the woods while a recording of the artist's brother recounting the times he was almost shot during encounters with the American police plays. In the film, a sun countenanced by the cartoon face of a black child swings in and out of view. The work intends to open up a conversation about racialized understandings of evil through tragic comedy. In another architectural intervention, Okoyomon has placed spheres made of black resin and cotton over the existing lighting features in the space. The work references to the Lantern Laws, an 18th century legal code that required black, mixed race, and indigenous people to carry lanterns if they were walking about New York City after sunset without the company of a white person. The show's press release, following the scholarship of Simone Browne, argues "the Lantern Laws lay[ed] the foundation for modern surveillance" and their existence reveals the long "history of the criminalization...of light, darkness, and the sun (which Okoyomon believes to be indisputably black)" The exhibition's title is taken from a Frantz Fanon's quotation from White Skin Black Masks, where the political philosopher and clinical psychiatrist offers people are “black, not because of a curse, but because [their] skin has been able to capture all the cosmic effluvia...a drop of sun under the earth.” Reviewer's noted Okoyomon's exhibition's engagement with Black studies Scholar Christina Sharpe's notion that anti-blackness is the weather, forwarded in her book "In the Wake: On Blackness and Being."

=== The End of The World (2019) ===
In Okoyomon's first play, commissioned for Serpentine Galleries's 2019 Cos X Park Night Series, curated by Claude Adjil, the artist cast four black women to play angels who have fallen to earth to initiate the reckoning. Performed in the Kensington Gardens Junya Ishigami Serpentine Architecture Pavilion, the play featured costumes made by Fabian Kis-Juhasz and a score written by Yves B. Golden.

=== Earthseed (2020) ===
Curated by Susanne Pfeffer, at the MMK in Frankfurt, Earthseed is Okoyomon's first institutional solo exhibition in Germany and their largest show to date. The exhibition's title is the name of a fictional religion in Octavia E. Butler’s books Parable of the Sower and Parable of the Talents, that proposes "the Earth’s seed can be transplanted anywhere and, through adaptation, will survive." Like the imagined religion, Okoyomon's exhibition envisions a "theology of mutation, flux, and motion."In a piece called "resistance is an atmospheric condition," Okoyomon filled the gallery space with the Japanese vine Kudzu. Responding to the gallery building's history as a passport office, Okoyomon used the invasive plant as an artwork to comment on ideas about immigration, invasion, race, and what is allowed to be considered natural. The show's press release recounts how Kudzu was first imported to the American South in 1876 with the intention that when planted its roots would strengthen the ecosystem's soil which as result of the excessive over cultivation of cotton by chattel slaves during the period was threatened by wide spread erosion. While the vine in some respects served its intended purpose and remains even today a foundational and necessary bulwark against the dissolution of the region's soil, the speed at which the vine was able to grow, when removed from its original planting and its natural predators, allowed it to consume massive tracts of land earning it the name "the vine that ate the south." Soon, growing or planting of Kudzu was made a criminal offense in many states. Okoyomon suggests that despite the fact that vine's "specific history as a failed remedy for the monumental toll slavery took on the ecological system of the American South has been largely forgotten," Kudzu might serve as a metaphor for Blackness itself, which like the plant, became monstrous when removed from its home in Africa and was taken to the states, where it functioned simultaneously as "indispensable to and irreconcilable with Western civilization." The show also includes six large scale sculptures, made out of raw wool, modeled after the dolls Okoyomon first exhibited in their first collaborative exhibition "I Need Help" with Hannah Black. Hannah Black wrote an essay for the exhibition's accompanying booklet.

Reviewing the show for the Frankfurter Allgemeine Zeitung, Stefan Trinks writes that the show is one of "those exhibitions, that despite [its] metabolic fullness, creates clarity." Trinks offers that Okoyomon's particular identity as an African immigrant to the United States might serve as a key to understanding the exhibition's complicated but perspicuous understanding of global Blackness, and the feelings of alienation and displacement that come along with navigating it.

=== Spiral Theory Test Kitchen (2018-ongoing) ===
In 2018, Okoyomon, Bobbi Salvör Menuez, and Quori Theodor, formed Spiral Theory Test Kitchen. In 2019, Rachel Hahn profiled "self-described collaborative queer cooking collective" and the experimental dishes they create, for Vogue Magazine, calling their meals "mind-altering." Other critics have noted the influence of BDSM, theories of quantum entanglement, Donna Haraway's scholarship, queer experience, language poetry, and Okoyomon's Nigerian upbringing on the group's psychosexual cuisine. In an article published by Eater, actress Indya Moore is quoted after eating a dinner made by the collective saying that “this is the most queer, trans, gender non-conforming food I’ve ever had in my whole life,” and joking “if you eat this food, it will deconstruct your toxic masculinity.” . For the Fashion designer Telfar's autumn/winter 2020 show at Florence’s Pitti Uomo, models were sent down a circular runway that doubled as a dining table for a meal prepared and envisioned by Spiral Theory Test Kitchen.

=== But Did U Die? (2020) ===
Okoyomon's second book "But Did U Die?" was published by Wonder Press in 2024. In an advanced blurb for the book by Eileen Myles, they write "Precious is every kind of artist but [they] could only be a poet. [Their] ‘also’ barges into every world, [Their] work is pure manifesto, stopping to laugh, it’s bawdy and pretty, handsome, cataclysmic and righteous. It’s food. It’s impatient and entirely on [their] own time and I think [they] touch ours, everyone else’s, in a burn the earth Jimi Hendrix way. No, [they're] post him. The earth is burnt. [They] start there."

=== Everything wants to kill you and you should be afraid (2026) ===
Okoyomon's work "Everything wants to kill you and you should be afraid" shows that nature can be gentle but sometimes dangerous. This artwork consists of various hanging toys and dolls that have been disassembled and reconstructed, with a pair of taxidermied bird wings on each one.

== Influences and inspirations ==
Okoyomon's practice has been influenced by the work of Pope L., Adrian Piper, Eileen Myles, Arthur Jafa, Pierre Huyghe, Anicka Yi, and Rirkrit Tiravanija. In an article in Artsy, Anicka Yi recognized Okoyomon as one of the female artists who deserves the art world's attention, calling Okoyomon "brilliant" and writing that she "believes [Okoyomon] is expanding the boundaries of what art can be." In a conversation at Art Basel Miami on Artist's influences, moderated by Hans Ulrich Obrist, Okoyomon and Rirkrit Tiravanija spoke about the inspiration they have had on each others work.
