= Drunk Tank Pink =

2021 studio album by Shame

Studio album by Shame
- Released: 15 January 2021
- Recorded: January–February 2020
- Genres: Post-punk, art punk
- Length: 41:35
- Label: Dead Oceans
- Producer: James Ford

Shame chronology
Songs of Praise (2018)	Drunk Tank Pink (2021)	Food for Worms (2023)

Singles from Drunk Tank Pink
- 1. "Alphabet" Released: 10 September 2020; 2. "Water in the Well" Released: 18 November 2020; 3. "Snow Day" Released: 3 December 2020; 4. "Nigel Hitter" Released: 6 January 2021; 5. "Born in Luton" Released: 20 June 2021

Drunk Tank Pink is the second studio album by the British post-punk band Shame, released on 15 January 2021 through Dead Oceans.

== Background ==
Following the conclusion of their Songs of Praise Tour, Shame swiftly commenced development of new material for their second studio album. The foundation of the album largely came together during a group trip to Scotland with electronic artist Makeness in April 2019, with songs like "Alphabet", "Snow Day", and "Great Dog" taking shape during that time. Most of the lyrical writing process took place at The Room Studios in Hither Green, London.

In late January 2020, NME reported that recording sessions for the album were complete and that on the album.

== Release ==
On 10 September 2020, Shame released the single "Alphabet", marking their first new material in two-and-a-half years. The same day, the band released a corresponding music video for "Alphabet", which features oversized heads in a tinsel pub. The music video was directed by Tegen Williams and produced by Kitty Wordsworth.

Two months later, on 18 November 2020, Shame released their second single, "Water in the Well," coinciding with the announcement of their next album Drunk Tank Pink, set for release on 15 January 15 2021. The music video for the single was directed by Pedro Takahashi.

Drunk Tank Pink was released during the COVID-19 pandemic in the United Kingdom. The band anticipated going on a headlining tour in February 2021 called the Socially Distant Tour, which was played at venues that allowed for social distancing. The tour began on 2 February 2021 in Leeds and ended on 27 February in Brighton.

== Artwork ==
The front cover of Drunk Tank Pink features a black-and-white image of Shame drummer Charlie Forbes's father, photographed by Tegen Williams. Frontman Charlie Steen explained how the album title and the text colour on the cover came to be: he painted his room pink and called it "the womb", and the colour he used is also known as "drunk tank pink", which is known to reduce aggressive behaviour and lower heart rates.

== Critical reception ==
Professional ratings
Aggregate scores
Source	Rating
AnyDecentMusic?	7.6/10
Metacritic	82/100
Review scores
Source	Rating
AllMusic	4/5 stars
Clash	8/10
Consequence of Sound	B+
DIY	4/5 stars
The Guardian	3/5 stars
Mojo	4/5 stars
NME	5/5 stars
Paste	7.8/10
Pitchfork	7.6/10
Uncut	4/5 stars

Drunk Tank Pink was met with widespread critical acclaim. At Metacritic, which assigns a normalised rating out of 100 to reviews from mainstream critics, the album received an average score of 82 based on 21 reviews, indicating "universal acclaim".

In a review for AllMusic, Heather Phares wrote: "Though it's named for the color used to subdue violently inebriated prisoners, there's little soothing about the band's second album; in fact, by comparison, their debut sounds almost staid. Shame sound unstoppable on Drunk Tank Pink, yet they also find new ways to channel that energy. At Clash, Erin Bashford said: "Drunk Tank Pink is a surreal landscape of desperation, frustration, and consideration, and a confident second record from the South Londoners. Each track feels like its own ecosystem, tackling its own demons and fighting with its own musical journey. It's certainly an album created with plenty of thought and various concepts tackled within its 40-odd minutes."

== Track listing ==
All tracks are written by Shame.

No.	Title	Length
1.	"Alphabet"	2:52
2.	"Nigel Hitter"	3:24
3.	"Born in Luton"	4:49
4.	"March Day"	3:12
5.	"Water in the Well"	3:07
6.	"Snow Day"	5:20
7.	"Human, for a Minute"	4:34
8.	"Great Dog"	2:00
9.	"6/1"	2:39
10.	"Harsh Degrees"	3:09
11.	"Station Wagon"	6:35
Total length:		41:35

Japanese edition bonus tracks
No.	Title	Length
12.	"Woodblock"	2:41
13.	"Alphabet" (Demo)	3:06
14.	"Water in the Well" (Demo)	3:28
Total length:		51:01

== Personnel ==
Shame

- Charlie Steen – lead vocals; claps (tracks 2, 7), guitars (track 8); additional piano, recorder (track 11); canoe painting, inner sleeve photography
- Eddie Green – guitars; backing vocals, claps (tracks 2, 7)
- Josh Finerty – bass, backing vocals; guitars (tracks 1, 4, 6, 9), synthesizer (tracks 2, 3, 8), claps (tracks 2, 7), percussion (tracks 3, 5, 7–9), drums (track 4), keyboards (track 7), piano (tracks 9, 11), table (track 9)
- Sean Coyle-Smith – guitars; backing vocals (tracks 1–5, 7–11), synthesizer (tracks 2, 3, 9, 10), claps (tracks 2, 7), percussion (tracks 5, 10)
- Charlie Forbes – drums; percussion (track 2), claps (tracks 2, 7)

Additional contributors

- James Ford – production, mixing; percussion (tracks 1, 2, 4–11), synthesizer (tracks 2–4, 8–10), claps (tracks 2, 7), keyboards (track 7)
- Matt Colton – mastering
- Anthony Cazade – engineering; claps (track 2)
- Tegan Williams – front cover photo
- Starkie Reay – back cover photo
- Anne Marie Fitzgerald – design
- Rosie Atcherley-Symes – additional design, discface
- Tatiana Pozuelo Méndez – additional design

== Charts ==
Chart performance for Drunk Tank Pink
Chart (2021)	Peak position
Belgian Albums (Ultratop Flanders)	23
Belgian Albums (Ultratop Wallonia)	107
Dutch Albums (Album Top 100)	97
Portuguese Albums (AFP)	50
Scottish Albums (Official Charts)	6
UK Albums (Official Charts)	8
