= Food for Worms =

Studio album by Shame
- Released: 24 February 2023
- Genre: Post-punk
- Length: 42:57
- Label: Dead Oceans
- Producer: Flood

Shame chronology
Drunk Tank Pink (2021)	Food for Worms (2023)	Cutthroat (2025)

Food for Worms is the third studio album by the British post-punk band Shame, released on 24 February 2023 through Dead Oceans. The album was produced by Flood and recorded live in the studio. It received positive reviews from critics and charted in the UK and several European countries.

== Critical reception ==
Professional ratings
Aggregate scores
Source	Rating
AnyDecentMusic?	7.3/10
Metacritic	75/100
Review scores
Source	Rating
AllMusic	3.5/5 stars
Clash	8/10
DIY	4.5/5 stars
The Independent	4/5 stars
Mojo	4/5 stars
NME	4/5 stars
The Observer	3/5 stars
Pitchfork	7.7/10
Slant Magazine	2.5/5 stars
Uncut	9/10

Food for Worms received a score of 75 out of 100 on review aggregator Metacritic based on 19 critics' reviews, indicating "generally favorable" reception. Heather Phares of AllMusic wrote that "On their previous albums, Shame always sounded resolutely sure of themselves. On Food for Worms, they're confident enough to entertain more possibilities and more vulnerability within their music." She concluded that "the results are a little muddled, but at its best, the album is a thrilling testament to creative bravery". Zach Schonfeld of Pitchfork felt that the band "emphasiz[e] melody, ramshackle piano, and reflections on friendship" on the album, as "their heart-on-sleeve earnestness further distinguishes this band" from their post-punk peers.

Erica Campbell of NME called the album "a refreshing refuge for those thirsting for music that stirs you up live, and allows you to play witness to a band's evolution of sound". Uncut stated that "the caustic wit of their first two albums is too often buried under shouty non-choruses and dirgey post-punk bluster, either side of a couple of more notable moments", while Mojo felt that "tracks such as the thunderous 'Six-Pack' or 'The Fall of Paul' might clang with dissonant noise or pinball off into a riot of machine gun rhythms, but it's generally not at the expense of songs that a festival crowd could bellow back at them".

DIY's Elvis Thirlwell remarked that the album "bulges with high-octane surprise", calling it "the sound of a band performing at the peak of their powers". Reviewing the album for The Independent, Megan Graye summarised that "Shame confidently embrace their flaws and resign themselves to the messy, beautiful chaos of their live shows. It's all captured within this bedhead of a record". James Mellen of Clash observed that the band "soften[s] the angsty post-punk edge of their first two projects" on Food for Worms, which he felt "shows the band at their most mature, most visceral, all while still playing with the youthful experimentation that launched them into stardom".

A staff review from Paste judged that "Shame tries to obscure the awkward fact that for a post-punk band, they're not the best at post-punk. But their washed-out rock songs are outstanding, finding new ground between their melancholic indie rock tendencies and the undercurrent of angst that propels the songs forward". Jamie Wilde of The Skinny found "the album's opening numbers are its most exciting" and overall that it "feels cohesive and wholeheartedly honest, embracing its rough edges with vulnerability. Guitar scene frontrunners once again? Most certainly." Writing for PopMatters, Alex Brent called it a "well-crafted and brilliantly performed album" that "showcases a group bringing in new influences and ideas, all with an infectious sense of enthusiasm and energy".

Slant Magazine's Fred Garrett opined that "for all the pulling and tugging at Shame's musical foundation, though, it's the moments that veer closest to familiarity that pay off most here" but felt that "aside from one or two cuts, though, nothing here is as satisfying as previous Shame highlights [that] managed to be both hooky and weird. For the most part, Food for Worms manages to be neither". Sam Eeckhout of The Line of Best Fit called the album "more evolution than revolution, a slow and slight nod to progression instead of the giant leap that would ignite the masses". Phil Mongredien of The Observer described it as "a small step back in the right direction, but at times they still sound somewhat leaden" on "their more introspective material".

== Track listing ==
All tracks are written by Shame.

Food for Worms track listing
No.	Title	Length
1.	"Fingers of Steel"	4:21
2.	"Six-Pack"	3:51
3.	"Yankees"	4:36
4.	"Alibis"	2:30
5.	"Adderall"	4:25
6.	"Orchid"	4:55
7.	"The Fall of Paul"	3:43
8.	"Burning by Design"	3:31
9.	"Different Person"	5:11
10.	"All the People"	5:54
Total length:		42:57

== Charts ==
Chart performance for Food for Worms
Chart (2023)	Peak position
Belgian Albums (Ultratop Flanders)	54
Belgian Albums (Ultratop Wallonia)	167
German Albums (Offizielle Top 100)	36
Scottish Albums (Official Charts)	9
UK Albums (Official Charts)	21
UK Independent Albums (Official Charts)	2
