= Cutthroat (album) =

Studio album by shame
- Released: 5 September 2025
- Studios: Salvation, Brighton, UK
- Genre: Post-punk
- Length: 39:56
- Label: Dead Oceans
- Producer: John Congleton

Shame chronology
Food for Worms (2023)	Cutthroat (2025)

Singles from Cutthroat
- 1. "Cutthroat" Released: 3 June 2025; 2. "Quiet Life" Released: 8 July 2025; 3. "Spartak" Released: 14 August 2025

Cutthroat is the fourth studio album by English post-punk band Shame. It was released on 5 September 2025, via Dead Oceans in LP, CD and digital formats.

== Background ==
Preceded by the band's 2023 release, Food for Worms, Cutthroat was produced by John Congleton and recorded at Salvation Studios in Brighton. It consists of twelve songs ranging between two and four minutes each, with a total runtime of approximately 40 minutes, and centres on ideas including conflict and corruption.

The title track, noted as "a brash, guitar-forward, psych punk jam", was released as the lead single on 3 June 2025, with a music video directed by Ja Humby. The second single of the album, "Quiet Life", was released on 8 July 2025. "Spartak" followed as the third single on 14 August 2025, alongside a music video directed by Charlie Steen.

== Reception ==
Professional ratings
Review scores
Source	Rating
AllMusic	3.5/5 stars
Dork	5/5 stars
Hot Press	8/10
MusicOMH	4.5/5 stars
NME	4/5 stars
Paste	8.2/10

Dan Harrison of Dork noted that the album "sounds like it was built with that same pressure in mind", stating "What makes Cutthroat stand up is all about the evolution of the band that made it," and giving it a rating of five out of five. Writing for Hot Press, Edwin McFee rated the album eight out of ten and described it as "a record that bristles with bravery, both musically and lyrically."

MusicOMH's Donovan Livesey assigned the project a rating of four-and-a-half stars, noting that "the album moves away from the sound Shame had been known for" and described it as "a thrill from start to finish, bold, brash, and full of life." Tatiana Tenreyro of Paste gave the album a score of 8.2 and commented that it "may lack the emotional vulnerability of Food for Worms, but none of its songs are devoid of thrills," referring to it as "bold and brash."

Cutthroat received a four-star rating from British music website NME, whose reviewer, David James Young, remarked "Cutthroat is at its most intriguing when it showcases the band's depth and multi-faceted nature," calling it a "testament to Shame's unwavering ability to adapt and evolve."

Writing for Beats Per Minute, John Amen was more ambivalent. He gave the album a rating of 68%, commenting, "Cutthroat offers some exhilarating moments, including the title track, but is also a problematic release." He concluded, "While the sequence brims with [shame's] signature I-may-be-fatigued-but-don’t-fuck-with-me attitude, the songs often fail to land, scattering like spores in a gale."

== Track listing ==
All tracks are written by shame
"Cutthroat" written with Seth Evans; "Plaster", "Packshot" written with Max Goulding.

Cutthroat track listing
No.	Title	Length
1.	"Cutthroat"	3:14
2.	"Cowards Around"	2:21
3.	"Quiet Life"	3:16
4.	"Nothing Better"	2:47
5.	"Plaster"	2:55
6.	"Spartak"	2:38
7.	"To and Fro"	2:26
8.	"Lampião"	3:29
9.	"After Party"	3:09
10.	"Screwdriver"	2:51
11.	"Packshot"	4:19
12.	"Axis of Evil"	3:31
Total length:		39:56

== Personnel ==
Credits adapted from Tidal.

=== Shame ===
- Charlie Steen – vocals, tambourine
- Sean Coyle-Smith – guitar
- Eddie Green – guitar
- Josh Finerty – bass
- Charlie Forbes – drums

=== Additional contributors ===
- John Congleton – production, mixing, engineering
- Matt Colton – mastering
- Jake Stainer – engineering
- Louie Edison – photography

== Charts ==
Chart performance for Cutthroat
Chart (2025)	Peak position
French Rock & Metal Albums (SNEP)	22
Scottish Albums (Official Charts)	19
UK Albums (Official Charts)	86
UK Independent Albums (Official Charts)	8
