= Color preferences =

Tendency for individual or group to prefer some colors over others

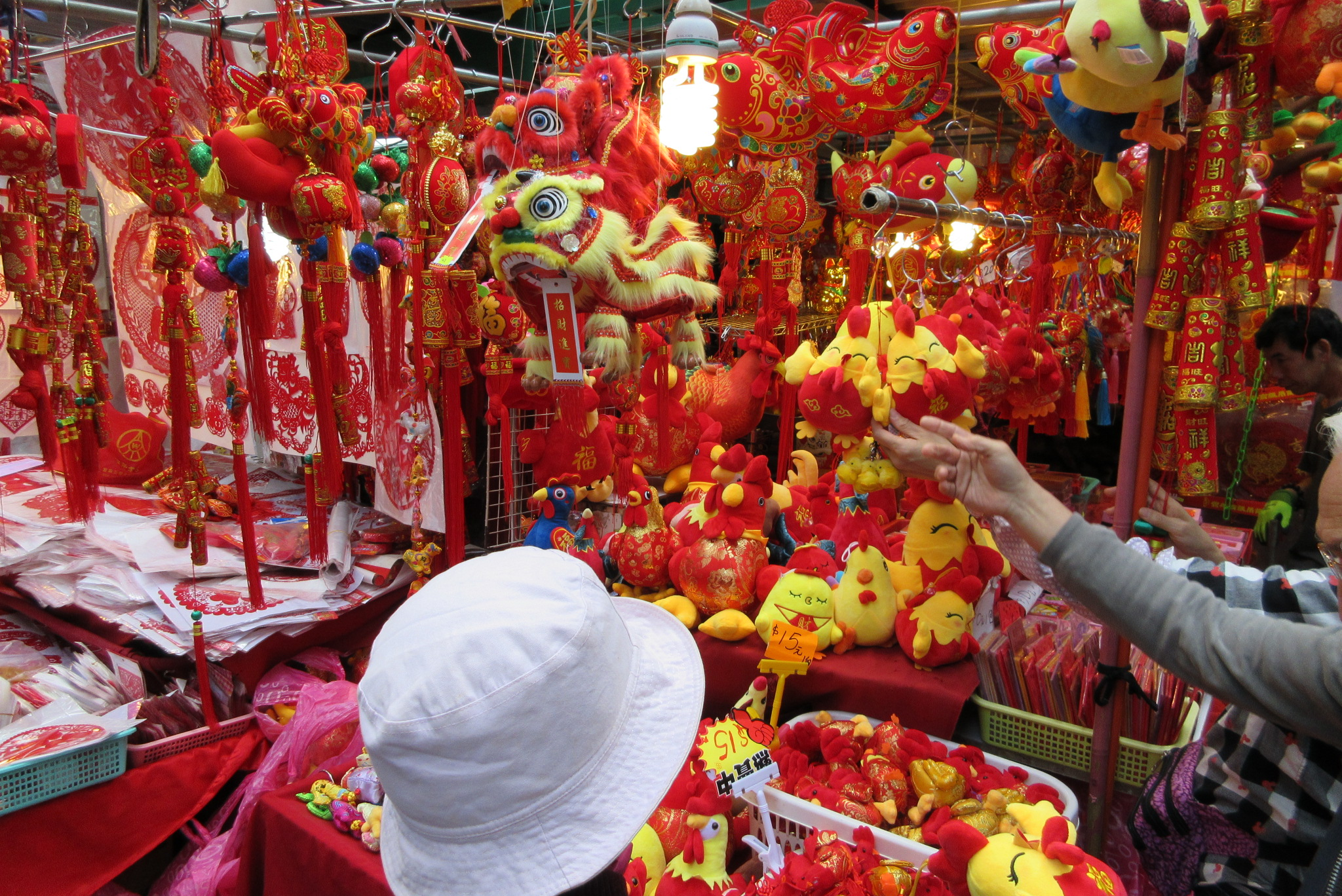
Red items on a street market stall in Wan Chai Market, Hong Kong. Red is considered lucky by many Chinese people.

In the psychology of color, color preferences are the tendency for an individual or a group to prefer some colors over others, such as having a favorite color or a traditional color.

== Introduction ==
An 'ecological valence theory' (EVT) has been suggested to explain why people have preferences for different colors. This is the idea that the preference for color is determined by the average affective response to everything the individual associates with the color. Hence, positive emotional experiences with a particular color are likely to increase the propensity to develop a preference for that color and vice versa. Social and cultural factors also factor into this affective response. A study in 2011 on the effects of "school spirit" and color preferences found students at the University of California, Berkeley were more likely to favor the university's official colors than were students from their rival Stanford University. This degree of preference was also correlated with their self-reported level of "school spirit". The researchers conducting the study concluded that this was evidence for the EVT.

== Children ==
Infants as young as 12 weeks old exhibit color preferences. Generally, children prefer the colors red/pink and blue, and cool colors are preferred over warm colors. Color perception of children 3–5 years of age is an indicator of their developmental stage. Color preferences tend to change as people age.

== In different societies ==
Favoritism of colors varies widely. Often societal influences will have a direct impact on what colors are favored and disdained. In the West, the color black symbolizes mourning and sadness, red symbolizes anger and violence, white symbolizes purity and peace, and yellow symbolizes joy and luck (other colors lack a consistent meaning). From a recent study, it was discussed that associative learning is the process where an individual develops color preferences. In different countries, color preference vary. In China, red indicates luck, while in Nigeria and Germany it means the exact opposite.

== See also ==
- Car color popularity
- Color psychology
- Color theory
- Color vision
- Lüscher color test
