= Kapwani Kiwanga =

Canadian artist (born 1978)

- Born: 1978 (age 47–48); Hamilton, Ontario, Canada
- Education: McGill University
- Alma mater: Ecole Nationale Supérieure des Beaux-Arts
- Occupation: Artist
- Known for: Video, installation, sound, performance artist
- Website: kapwanikiwanga.org

Kapwani Kiwanga (born 1978) is a Canadian and French artist working in Paris, France. Her work is known for dealing with issues of colonialism, gender, and the African diaspora.

== Early life and education ==
Kiwanga was born in 1978 in Hamilton, Ontario, Canada, and grew up in the nearby town of Brantford, where she took classes at the Glenhyrst Art Gallery. She has said that she gained her perspective on colonialism and Canada's Indigenous people from her time in Brantford, which is situated on the Haldimand Tract in the traditional territories of the Anishinaabe and Haudenosaunee peoples. Kiwanga studied anthropology and comparative religion at McGill University in Montreal, and art at the "La Seine" program at the Ecole Nationale Supérieure des Beaux-Arts in Paris. As such, Kiwanga’s artistic practice is intensely research-based, and she often embodies the guise of a scientist, anthropologist, or archivist in the performative “happenings” that are an integral aspect of her overall work in sculpture, painting, video and mixed media installations. Prior to moving to Paris, Kiwanga lived in Scotland, in the United Kingdom, and worked as a documentary filmmaker for television, earning her two BAFTA nominations. She lives and works in Paris.

== Work ==
Kiwanga's work is shaped by her academic background, and often involves multiple formats and media in order to present a diversity of experiences for the viewer. Kiwanga explores the social and political aspects of the world by presenting these multiple perspectives, a skill she formed growing up in Canada, visiting family in Tanzania, and spending much of her adult life in France. She employs strategies of social scientific research and documentary modes of presentation in her work. In her Afrogalactica trilogy project (commenced 2011), Kiwanga plays the role of an anthropologist from the future, whose research draws upon Afrofuturism, African astronomy and gender. In Safe Passage, Kiwanga goes through the history of blackness in America, from slavery to contemporary time and the effect of technology on issues like visibility. It is a sculptural work that is researched-driven and based in Kiwanga's anthropological roots.

Since her first solo exhibition in 2014 at Jeu de Paume, Paris, Kiwanga has received increasingly widespread critical attention for her interdisciplinary approach to art-making that prods the realms of history, psychology, and other social sciences, alongside the "pure" sciences. Her work aims to offer nuanced and subversive insight into what constitutes knowledge, truth and authority, both historically and in the present, especially in matters related to the administration of bodies, cultural identity, and behavior. In her ongoing project Flowers For Africa the artist mined archives related to African de-colonization to compile a list of flowers associated with individuals, nations and/or resistance movements; an image library that became the basis for meticulous sculptural recreations of individual flowers, or entire bouquets. Kapwani described the series, in relation to her overall approach, as such: “What I’m trying to do is to acquaint myself with these various historic times, and questions, and more generally an interest I have in power dynamics. With this project I have chosen to look from the African continent at these global questions of power dynamics. This project is a way for me to acquaint myself with different archives, consulting documents and simply pondering on those moments. In this process, this was the most natural gesture which emerged".

Throughout her career, Kiwanga has conducted research using historic and scientific collections for the creation of artworks and performed or presented her work at more than 50 institutions and festivals internationally since 2011. Her performances and exhibits include Afrogalactica: A Brief History of the Future at La Villa Arson, Nice (2012); Afrogalactica: A Brief History of the Future – A Thousand Years of Nonlinear History, Centre Pompidou, Paris (2013), where she plays the role of an anthropologist from the future who lectures about fictitious and factual topics including research into Afrofuturism, African astronomy and the construction of gender and racial categories; A Conservator's Tale, Jeu de Paume, Paris (2014); Museum of the Blind, Ethnological Museum of Berlin (2014); Afrogalactica: A Brief History of the Future – Across the Board, Tate Project in Lagos, Nigeria (2014); A Spell to Bound the Limitless, FIAC (in progress), Grand Palais, Paris (2015); Afrogalactica: A Brief History of the Future, Documenta 14, Athens (2017); Afrogalactica : A Brief History of the Future, Momentum Nordic Biennial of Contemporary Art, Sweden (2017); and Afrogalactica : A Brief History of the Future, Illingworth Kerr Gallery, Calgary (2018).

== Themes ==
=== Research and Archives ===
Throughout her career, Kiwanga has conducted research using historic and scientific collections for the creation of artworks. In her early performance trilogy Afrogalactica (2011–), Kiwanga plays the role of an anthropologist from the future who lectures about fictitious and factual topics including research into Afrofuturism, African astronomy and the construction of gender and racial categories. Kiwanga works with other conventions of academia and archives in other performances: A Conservator’s Tale (2014) and A spell to bound the Limitless (2014).

Maji Maji, her solo exhibition in 2014 at Jeu de Paume, Paris, featured the installation Rumours that Maji was a lie ... (2014); “a tower of shelving to anchor disparate material—a video, fabric, plants, slides, photographs, and prints—as testimony to the living memory of the war.” This interdisciplinary collection stemmed from research into the Maji Maji War when, “in 1905, in what was then Tanganyika, now Tanzania, the Germans crushed a rebellion led by Kinjeketile Ngwale, who had convinced his followers he could magically transform German bullets into water, or maji in Swahili.” Kinjeketile Suite (2015) at South London Gallery was a multimedia installation also taking the Maji Maji Rebellion as a point of departure.

=== Power and social control, color and light ===
In Linear Paintings (2017–) Kiwanga deploys research into the psychology and sociology of colour and architecture through paintings on drywall panels each featuring two coloured blocks. The colours selected by Kiwanga were sourced from technical manuals and social-architectural theory about the proposed effects of certain colours on prison populations, coastguards, industrial workers or hospital patients, among other contexts. Both the colours themselves and the height at which they meet on each panel when installed are drawn from research into the late-19th to early-20th century, when “interest in scientific methods and techniques to improve health care, control disease, and promote social and physical wellness surged with the rise of social hygiene movements and hospital reforms.”

The disciplinary functions of colour and light in architecture are also the focus of pink-blue (2017), an installation where one part of a hallway is painted Baker-Miller pink and illuminated with white fluorescent light, while the other part is painted white and is illuminated with blue fluorescent light. Baker-Miller pink is a specific shade of pink that has been used as interior paint to reduce aggressive behaviour in certain penal institutions starting in the 20th century following scientific research in the 1960s. The blue portion of the space references the use of blue lights in public spaces with the intention of deterring intravenous drug use because the light reduces the visibility of veins. The effectiveness of the harm-reduction claimed by both strategies has been called into question. The relationship in this work between architectural decisions and social control are summarised by writer Iman Sultan: “It’s clear that aesthetics are in a constant, ever-evolving relationship with power. Shadow and light can be used to subvert and rebel, just as they are employed, institutionally, to subdue and command.”

In the exhibition Safe Passage, Kiwanga used sculptural works to communicate ideas about racialized surveillance and legislation in America. The exhibition included Jalousie (2018); a screen-like sculpture with louvres composed of one-way mirrored glass referencing a typical jalousie, which is used to “peer out without being seen, while also creating shade and facilitating the circulation of cool air — a central concern of proponents of the public hygiene movements of the late 19th and early 20th centuries. Critic Simon Wu notes that, like the one-way mirrors used for Jalousie, Kiwanga often refers to the historical contexts and power dynamics that inspired the works obliquely, leaving the viewer’s experience of the artwork to reveal and reflect different things to different viewers. Glow (2019–) is a series of roughly human-sized sculptures taking the form of dark stone-clad, straight- edged shapes each inlaid with a light source, first included in Safe Passage. This series is based on research into the so-called Lantern Laws, a legal code in 18th Century New York that mandated Black, mixed-race and Indigenous people carry candle-lanterns when in public after dark when not accompanied by a white person. Art historian Elvan Zabunyan writes that the forms of the Glow series are “a reminder of those black bodies walking in the dark, lit to remain visible,” and how, “by shedding light on history, Kiwanga produces flashbacks and establishes trajectories in which ancient periods and current events coexist.”

For the installation Cloak (2022), commissioned for her solo exhibition Off-Grid at the New Museum, Kiwanga built on her research into visibility and control with a focus on the NYPD’s use of high-powered mobile floodlights for surveillance. In collaboration with the gallery, Kiwanga acquired a number of these floodlights, extracted and transformed their aluminium parts into a light absorbing paint that was applied to a beaded curtain and triangular wall panels interspersed with mirrored panels. As critic Aruna D'Souza writes, Kiwanga’s interest was in inverting the power dynamic that the material participated in, turning it from a tool for surveillance into something that absorbed light and obscured vision.

=== Material histories ===
In Kiwanga’s oeuvre, particular materials have become significant strands of the artist’s research. Some recurring materials explored by the artist include sisal fibre, shade-cloth, other textiles, sand, glass, light, seeds and various plants.

Shady (2018), Line (2023) and Black Blue Hour (2023), among others, all utilise shade cloth; a woven fabric that is widely used to create shade and “protect crops in commercial farming which, due to foreign investment, now covers swathes of landscape from North America to Africa.” As Glenn Adamson notes in the publication accompanying Off-Grid, the function of shade cloth as a filtering screen “is an apt metaphor for one of Kiwanga’s presiding concerns: the linkage between acts of looking and acts of power.”

Kiwanga also works with sisal, the fibre processed from the plant Agave sisalana, native to Central America. In works like White Gold: Morogoro (2016) and Maya Bantu (2021) the processed fibre is draped over metal structures as it might be seen drying in Tanzanian fields where the artist first encountered it and where the production of this fibre has become of major economic importance since its importation and use as a cash crop during the colonial era. Writer and curator Yesomi Umolu describes how the material can play a symbolic role, such as in Kiwanga’s 2015 solo exhibition Kinjeketile Suite at South London Gallery where “the sisal rope represented the extractive economy of the colony” positioned alongside photographs, magazines, political pamphlets, textiles and live plants, each representing or literally carrying the narratives of different people involved in Tanzanian political life, from before German colonisation until after its independence.

A recurring project that engages with archival collections and a living material is Flowers for Africa (2013–ongoing). While researching public archives in Dakar, Senegal, Kiwanga explored collections relating to the independence of Senegal from France including images of ceremonies and diplomatic events that happened to include floral arrangements. Kiwanga explains that “In Flowers for Africa, the authority of the archival image is replaced with floral arrangements. Bouquets, boutonnières, garlands, and centerpieces — present during key moments in African independence and captured on film, still or moving — are shown to florists, who appropriate them in their own compositional language.” It is these reconstructed floral arrangements that are displayed, left to wilt and decay. In contrast to typical archives, like those in Dakar where the artist first encountered these images, Kiwanga writes that artworks of Flowers for Africa “slip away from the status of factual evidence and become fallible witnesses.” This project connects many of the themes present in Kiwanga’s practice as she writes: “With this project, I intentionally reach beyond the historic image. It is my attempt to think of a new archive [...] the best chance one has of attending to, or leaning into, a place of liberation.”

== Major exhibitions ==
Solo exhibitions of Kapwani Kiwanga's work have been held at the Centre Georges Pompidou, CCA Glasgow, the Irish Museum of Modern Art, the Bienal Internacional de Arte Contemporáneo in Almeria, Spain, Salt Beyoglu in Istanbul, the South London Gallery, the Jeu de Paume, the Kassel Documentary Film and Video Festival, Paris Photo, and The Power Plant. Kiwanga was the 2016 Commissioned Artist at the Armory Show. In January–March 2018, the Glenhyrst Art Gallery of Brant held a solo exhibition of her work entitled Kapwani Kiwanga: Clearing. In February–May 2018, the Esker Foundation put on A wall is just a wall (and nothing more at all). From 8 February 2019 to 21 April 2019, Kiwanga was exhibited at the MIT List Visual Arts Center in a solo show titled Safe Passage. An exhibition at the New Museum in New York, from June 30 through October 16, 2022, examined the social history of light as a form of surveillance. The first major survey exhibition in Canada of the artist's work was held at the Museum of Contemporary Art, Toronto, from February 23 to July 23, 2023.

Also in 2024 Kiwanga presented her solo exhibition Where salt and freshwater meet and crooked trees filter the sun at Serralves Museum in Porto. In 2023, she was commissioned to produce a major new installation for the main hall of the CAPC Musée d’Art Contemporain de Bordeaux in southwestern France to mark the institution’s 50th anniversary. The site-specific artwork, Retenue (2023), consisted of indigo-dyed rope hung from the ceiling and arches of the former warehouse evoking the colonial purposes of the space for the accumulation and distribution of commodities through the global shipping trade. Water flowed along some of these ropes to fall into incisions in the ground metaphorically connecting the CAPC with the nearby Garonne river.

== Awards ==
Kiwanga has received two BAFTA nominations for her film and video works, and has received the following awards for her work:

- 2018: Frieze Artist Award
- 2018: Sobey Art Award
- 2018: ADAGP-Etant donnés
- 2020: Marcel Duchamp Prize
- 2025: Joan Miró Prize

Kiwanga’s work is found in major collections including Albertinum Staatliche Kunstsammlungen, Dresden; Kunsthaus Pasquart, Biel/Bienne; MIT List Visual Arts Center, Cambridge USA; MUSAC–Museo del Arte Contemporáneo de Castilla y Léon, Léon; Musée d’Art Contemporain, Montréal; Pérez Art Museum, Miami; National Gallery of Canada, Ottawa, Neuer Berliner Kunstverein, Berlin; Musée d’Art Moderne de la Ville de Paris, Paris, Solomon R. Guggenheim Museum, New York.
