= Concrete (Shame song) =

Single by Shame

from the album Songs of Praise
- Released: 20 September 2017
- Genre: Post-punk
- Length: 3:34
- Label: Dead Oceans
- Songwriter(s): Eddie Green; Charlie Forbes; Josh Finerty; Sean Coyle-Smith; Charlie Steen

Shame singles chronology
"Visa Vulture" (2017)	"Concrete" (2017)	"One Rizla" (2017)

Music video
- "Concrete" on YouTube

"Concrete" is a song by British punk rock band, Shame. The song is the first promotional single off of their debut studio album, Songs of Praise. The single was released on 20 September 2017 through Dead Oceans.

== Background ==
In an interview with National Public Radio, lead singer, Charlie Steen, described that track as a flâneur's perspective on the psychological and emotionally draining effects of a doomed relationship". Steen further described the track as "a moment where all of the worries and thoughts one might feel within this entrapment are isolated and embraced – a moment where the futility of reasoning is accepted."

The song features a call-and-response set of vocals between lead singer Steen and bassist Josh Finerty. Per an interview with NPR, the idea of that was to represent the trapping feeling of being in a relationship that almost feels like you're talking with yourself. The song went through several renditions as the band formed before the entire band contributed to the vocals at the ending of the track. Per Steen this gave the song a "schoolboy-choir [sound], vaguely angelic finale that we were looking for."

== Critical reception ==
Writing for National Public Radio (NPR), Bob Boilen called "Concrete" a passionate song with "call-and-response stuttered guitars". Boilen compared the track to fellow British post-punk band, Gang of Four. Boilen however said that Shame's music, and the song Concrete specifically feel "vital" with "19-year-old [Charlie] Steen and bassist Josh Finerty screaming at each other, revealing the inner dialog of the song's main character".

In a separate NPR review of the track, Lars Gotrich described a song that lurches like a vampire bat and kicks grinning teeth.

Cady Siregar, writing for The Quietus compared their song to post-punk band, Fat White Family, describing the song as "highly politicised songwriting and their merry-go-round of raucous hedonism on and off stage has perhaps inevitably drawn comparisons with Fat White Family - and Shame are part of the south London scene that spawned Fat Whites. But they have also helped revive the good old ‘Is guitar music dead?’ debate; Shame are, undeniably and perhaps frustratingly, all white men and that tired old debate seems only to include bands of white men."

John Norris, writing for Billboard praised the track for its exhilarating sound, and compared the track to Parquet Courts, Slint, The Clash, Beck, and Gang of Four. Norris said that the song has a "witty, melodic, fiery and addictive vibe".

== Music video ==
A corresponding music video was released on 20 September 2017, the same day as the single's release. The music video is a fourth wall breakdown between friction and reality. It features Steen walking on a treadmill before joining his bandmates.
