= Songs of Praise (Shame album) =

Studio album by Shame
- Released: 12 January 2018
- Recorded: April 2017
- Studio: Rockfield
- Genres: Post-punk; indie rock
- Length: 38:29
- Label: Dead Oceans
- Producers: Dan Foat; Nathan Boddy

Shame chronology
Live Sermons (2018)	Songs of Praise (2018)	Drunk Tank Pink (2021)

Singles from Songs of Praise
- 1. "Concrete" Released: 20 September 2017; 2. "One Rizla" Released: 15 November 2017; 3. "Lampoon" Released: 27 February 2018

Songs of Praise is the debut studio album by the British post-punk band Shame, released via Dead Oceans in January 2018.

== Critical reception ==
Professional ratings
Aggregate scores
Source	Rating
AnyDecentMusic?	7.9/10
Metacritic	83/100
Review scores
Source	Rating
AllMusic	4/5 stars
Financial Times	3/5 stars
The Guardian	4/5 stars
Mojo	4/5 stars
NME	5/5 stars
Pitchfork	7.5/10
Q	4/5 stars
Record Collector	5/5 stars
The Times	4/5 stars
Uncut	8/10

Songs of Praise was met with widespread critical acclaim. At Metacritic, which assigns a normalised rating out of 100 to reviews from mainstream critics, the album received an average score of 83, based on 20 reviews.

Reviewing for The Times in January 2018, Will Hodgkinson said "this album has excitement and confidence fizzing out of every song, the spirit of punk-rock defiance given an energy shot for a new generation." Eve Barlow of Pitchfork proclaimed, "the UK rock group separates themselves from their peers, imbuing their post-adolescent rage with wit and, crucially, a self-effacing awareness that they may never succeed." In Mojo, Martin Aston called Songs of Praise an "incendiary debut" from a band who are "a visceral, frayed, clanging racket but still mindful of tunes".

Robert Christgau was lukewarm about the album and said, although Shame can "assemble a fast rock song—I see where the honorific 'punk' comes up in their reviews of praise, but this music just isn't intense enough to merit it—their affect is devoid of any species of uplift: humor, empathy, solidarity, lyrics with a twist, all that corny stuff I retain a yen for. Formally anthemic, spiritually not is another way to put it. True enough, this has turned into a white male mindset, affliction, what have you. Part of the problem not part of the solution. Might they lift themselves out of it sometime? Hope so."

== Track listing ==
All tracks are written by Shame.

No.	Title	Length
1.	"Dust on Trial"	3:34
2.	"Concrete"	3:34
3.	"One Rizla"	3:34
4.	"The Lick"	4:11
5.	"Tasteless"	3:05
6.	"Donk"	1:41
7.	"Gold Hole"	4:46
8.	"Friction"	4:31
9.	"Lampoon"	2:34
10.	"Angie"	6:55
Total length:		38:29

== Personnel ==
Shame

- Charlie Steen – lead vocals
- Sean Coyle-Smith – guitar; backing vocals (track 2)
- Eddie Green – guitar; backing vocals (track 2)
- Josh Finerty – bass guitar; backing vocals (all tracks except 1); additional percussion (track 10)
- Charlie Forbes – drums; backing vocals (tracks 2, 3, 7–9)

Additional performers

- Holly Whitaker – backing vocals (track 10)
- Dan Foat – programming, keyboards
- Nathan Boddy – programming, keyboards

Production

- Dan Foat – production
- Nathan Boddy – production, mixing
- Sean Genockey – engineering
- Samir Alikhanizadeh – additional production (track 1)
- Joe Jones – assistant engineer
- Paul Carr – assistant engineer
- Ric Baxendale – additional engineering (tracks 1, 8, 10)
- Matt Colton – mastering

Artwork

- Holly Whitaker – photography
- Miles Johnson – design

== Charts ==
Chart (2018)	Peak position
Belgian Albums (Ultratop Flanders)	42
Belgian Albums (Ultratop Wallonia)	175
French Albums (SNEP)	106
Dutch Albums (Album Top 100)	94
Scottish Albums (Official Charts)	41
UK Albums (Official Charts)	32

== Accolades ==
Publication	Accolade	Rank	Ref.
Piccadilly Records	Top 100 Albums of 2018	72	
Rough Trade	Top 100 Albums of 2018	1	
Paste	The 50 Best Albums of 2018	12	
