= Color psychology =

Study of influence of color on human behavior

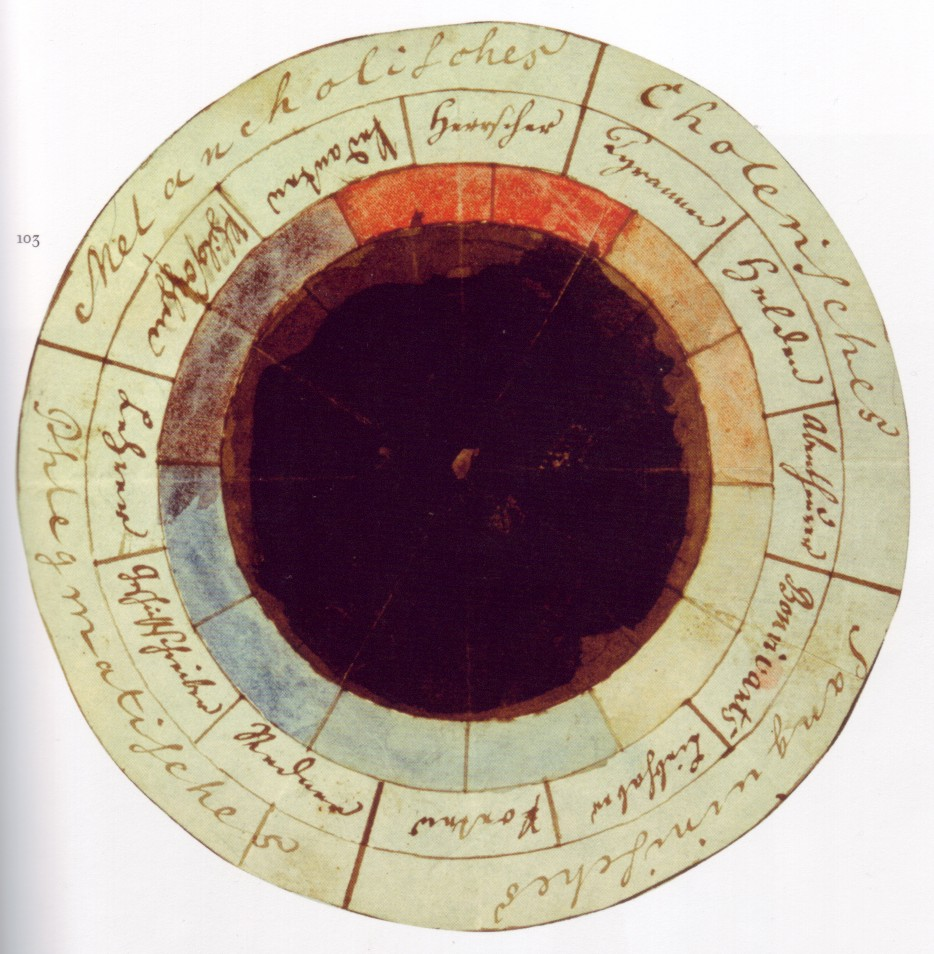
The "rose of temperaments" (Temperamenten-Rose) compiled by Goethe and Schiller in 1798/9. The diagram matches twelve colors to human occupations or their character traits, grouped in the four temperaments: * choleric (red/orange/yellow): tyrants, heroes, adventurers * sanguine (yellow/green/cyan) hedonists, lovers, poets * phlegmatic (cyan/blue/violet): public speakers, historians * melancholic (violet/magenta/red): philosophers, pedants, rulers

Color psychology is the study of colors and hues as a determinant of human behavior. Color influences perceptions that are not obvious, such as the taste of food. Colors have qualities that may cause certain emotions in people. How color influences individuals may differ depending on age, gender, and culture. Although color associations may vary contextually from culture to culture, one author asserts that color preference may be relatively uniform across gender and race.

Color psychology is widely used in marketing and branding. Marketers see color as an important factor, since color may influence consumer emotions and perceptions about goods and services. Logos for companies are important, since the logos may attract more customers.

The field of color psychology applies to many other domains such as medical therapy, sports, hospital settings, and even in game design. Carl Jung has been credited as one of the pioneers in this field for his research on the properties and meanings of color in our lives. According to Jung, "colors are the mother tongue of the subconscious".

Before there was color psychology as a field, color was being used for centuries as a method of treatment as early as 2000 BC. The ancient Egyptians documented color "cures" using painted rooms or sunlight shining through crystals as therapy. One of the earliest medical documents, the Huangdi Neijing, documents color diagnoses associated with color healing practices.

In 1810, German poet Johann Wolfgang von Goethe published Theory of Colors, a book explaining his beliefs on the psychological nature of color. In his book, von Goethe describes the color yellow as "serene" and blue as a mixture of "excitement and repose". In 1942, Kurt Goldstein, a German neurologist, conducted a series of experiments on various participants to determine the effects of color on motor function. In one experiment, Goldstein claims that a woman suffering from a cerebral disease was prone to frequently falling over and that wearing red significantly increased this. However, wearing the colors green or blue calmed these symptoms. Other researchers were unable to prove Goldstein's studies to be true through replication, therefore, his hypothesis is considered unproven. While Goldstein's hypothesis was never proven, his work encouraged further research into the physiological effects of color.

Carl Jung is most prominently associated with the pioneering stages of color psychology in the twentieth century. Jung was most interested in the properties and meanings of colors, as well as in art's potential as a tool for psychotherapy. His studies in and writings on color symbolism cover a broad range of topics, from mandalas to the works of Picasso, to the near-universal sovereignty of the color gold, the lattermost of which, according to Charles A. Riley II, "expresses... the apex of spirituality, and intuition". In pursuing his studies of color use and effects across cultures and time periods, as well as in examining his patients' self-created mandalas, Jung attempted to unlock and develop a language, or code, the ciphers of which would be colors. He looked to alchemy to further his understanding of the secret language of color, finding the key to his research in alchemical transmutation. His work has historically informed the modern field of color psychology.

== General model ==
The general model of color psychology relies on six basic principles:

1. Color may carry a specific meaning.
2. Color meaning is either based in learned meaning or biologically innate meaning.
3. The perception of a color causes evaluation automatically by the person perceiving.
4. The evaluation process forces color-motivated behavior.
5. Color usually exerts its influence automatically.
6. Color meaning and effect has to do with context as well.

== Embodied and referential theory of color ==
According to the embodied and referential theory of color, color may convey two types of meaning that uniquely stimulate and shape consumer preferences and behaviors.

- Referential meaning arises from the network of semantic associations that emerge through exposure to color stimuli. As such, referential meaning is learned and often dependent on contextual cues. For example, the referential meaning conveyed by the use of the color brown in effervescent beverages can evoke notions of cola taste, which are drawn from the learned association of prominent cola brands adding caramel color to their products.
- Embodied meaning results from attributes embodied in the aesthetic stimulus, independent of context and the semantic content it may evoke. This meaning is evoked from properties within the stimulus, that is feelings and other responses are activated simply from exposure to the color. For example, long wavelength colors such as red may stimulate arousal and increase attention. This model proposes that biological responses to color (e.g., physiological responses such as increased heart rate or attention) are driven by the embodied meaning of a color.
- The model also considers that influencers of color experience do not act in isolation. For instance, some learned color associations may represent a cognitive reinforcing or alteration of biologically based phenomena. Moreover, color associations may vary by culture and learned color associations may also influence some cultural aspects.
- The theory notes the importance of context for referential meanings of color (i.e., these meanings are context-dependent, while the embodied meanings are not).

== Influence of color on perception ==
Multiple researchers propose that one factor in the evolution of primate trichromatic color vision is to allow for better perception of the emotions or condition of others that can prove highly useful for complex social interaction. For example, flushed or pale skin can non-verbally communicate whether one is excited or sickly. Besides its use for social situations, color has an impact in multiple facets of our perceptions.

=== Taste ===
Color also affects how people perceive the edibility and flavor of foods and drinks. This extends beyond just the color of the food. The packaging of the food and its placement among other foods and objects also affect how people perceive it. For example, in food stores, bread is normally sold in packaging decorated with or tinted with golden or brown tones to promote the idea of home-baked and oven-freshness. People might mistake a cherry-flavored drink for being lime or lemon flavored if that drink was a green color. Additionally, a flavor may seem to be intensified by a color. People may rate a brown M&M as more chocolate flavored than a green M&M, based on color alone. This interaction may be mediated by our perceptions as well, especially depending on cultural expectation. Research in the UK demonstrated that individuals receiving a brown drink would have different expectations for the taste (i.e. expecting a cola) while someone from Taiwan may expect a grape-flavored drink because popular brown colored drinks in their culture are typically grape-flavored.

=== Time ===
Recent studies showed that the perceived duration of a red screen was longer than that of a blue screen. The results reflected gender differences; men overestimated the duration of the red screen. Additionally, the reaction times to a red screen were faster than those to a blue screen. Participants who reacted quickly to a red screen overestimated its duration. In a demo with 150 people chosen at random, it was found that inside a pod bathed in blue color, the average perceived duration of a minute was 11 seconds shorter than while in a pod bathed in red color. However, another study looking at perceived duration found opposite results regarding blue and red stimuli.

=== Light ===
The color of a light source affects the apparent color of an object the light shines on. For example, the color of an object might appear different in the light from the sun versus from an incandescent (tungsten) light bulb. With the incandescent light bulb, the object might appear more orange or "brownish", and dark colors might look even darker. Light and the color of an object may affect how one perceives its positioning. If light or shadow, or the color of the object, masks an object's true contour (outline of a figure) it may appear to be shaped differently from reality. Objects under a uniform light-source will promote better impression of three-dimensional shape. The color of an object may affect whether or not it seems to be in motion. In particular, the trajectories of objects under a light source whose intensity varies with space are more difficult to determine than identical objects under a uniform light source. This could possibly be interpreted as interference between motion and color perception, both of which are more difficult under variable lighting.

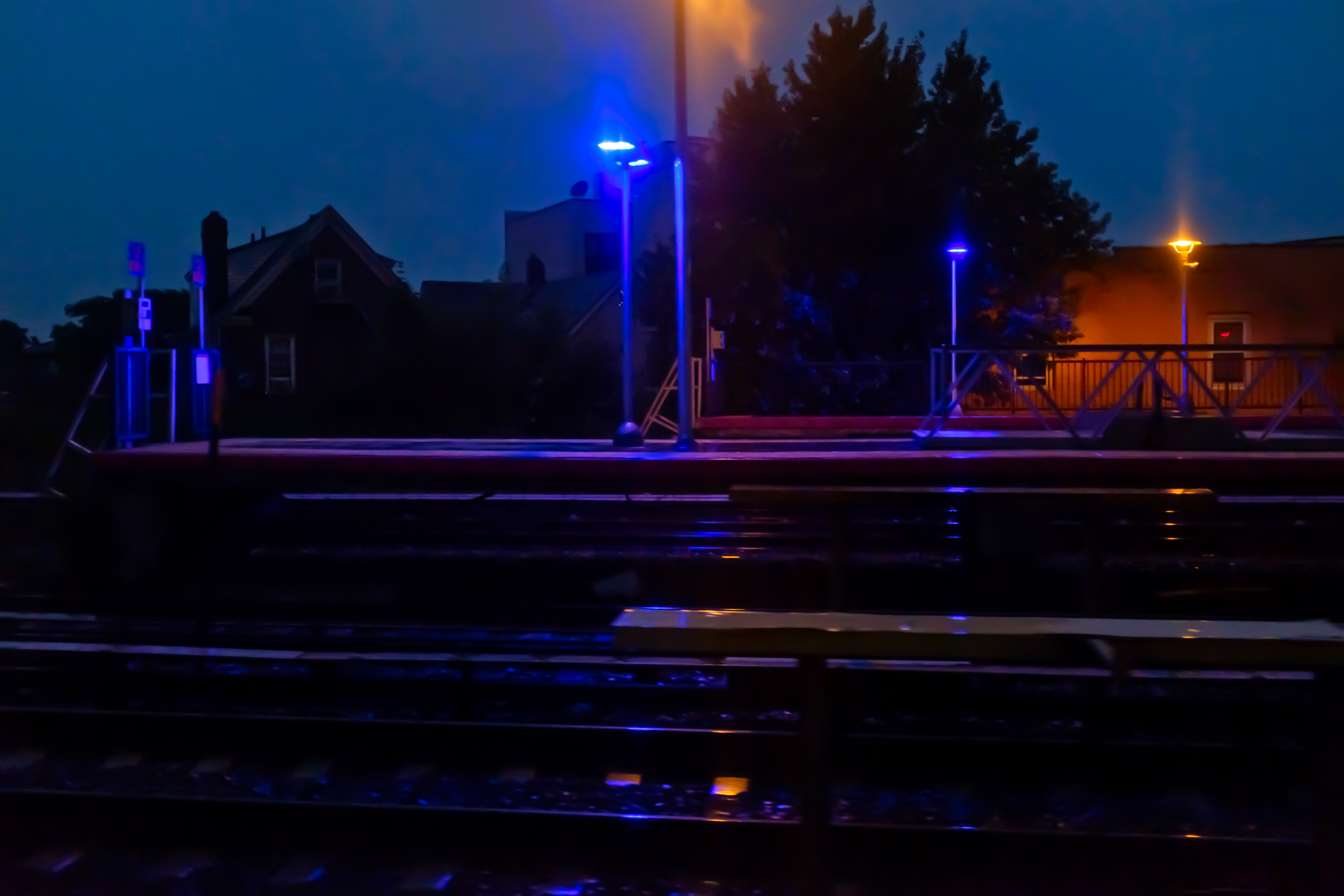
Blue lights (R) at the Woodside LIRR train station in New York

Blue light causes people to feel relaxed, which has led countries to install blue street lights in order to decrease suicide rates. A railroad company in Japan installed blue lighting at its stations in October 2009 in an effort to reduce the number of rail suicide attempts, although the effect of this technique has been questioned. In 2000, the city of Glasgow installed blue street lighting in certain neighborhoods and subsequently reported the anecdotal finding of reduced crime in these areas.

Lighting color could also have a strong effect on perceived experience in stores and other situations. For example, time seems to pass more slowly under red lights and time seems to pass quickly under blue light. Casinos take full advantage of this phenomenon by using lighting color to get people to spend more time and hence more money in their casino. However, a presumed influence of colored light (red vs. blue) on risk behavior could not be demonstrated.

=== Pharmaceuticals ===
The color of placebo pills is reported to be a factor in their effectiveness, with "hot-colored" (red, yellow, etc.) pills working better as stimulants and "cool-colored" (blue, purple, etc.) pills working better as depressants. This relationship is believed to be a consequence of patient expectations and not a direct effect of the color. Consequently, these effects appear to be culture-dependent.

== Color preference and the connection between color and emotion ==
Graph of color temperature comfort zones.

How people respond to different color stimuli varies from person to person. In a U.S. study by Lamancusa, blue is the top choice at 35%, followed by green (16%), purple (10%), and red (9%). A concept proposed by Dutton in evolutionary aesthetics is that blue and green may reflect a preference for certain habitats that were beneficial in an "ancestral environment". Orange, yellow, and brown are reported as the least popular colors, respectively.

One theory for why people prefer one color more than another is called ecological valence theory (EVT) proposed by Stephen Palmer and Karen Schloss. This theory asserts that people tend to like or dislike colors based on their associations of the color to other objects or situations that they have strong feelings about. For example, if someone associates the color blue with clean water, they would be more likely to favor blue. On the other hand, dislike of the color brown could be due to associations with feces or rotten food.

Another theory indicates that color preference may depend on ambient temperature. People who are cold are reported to select warm colors such as red or yellow often, while people who are hot favor cool colors such as blue and green. In another study, introverted individuals were found to be more attracted to cool colors, while extroverts prefer warmer colors.

Psychologist Andrew J. Elliot tested to see if the color of a person's clothing could make them appear more sexually appealing. He found heterosexual men and women dressed in red were significantly more likely to attract romantic attention from each other than when dressed in any other color. The color did not affect heterosexual women's assessment of other women's attractiveness (unrelated to romance). Other studies also have shown men dressed in red appeal to heterosexual women.

The Kelvin scale is used to quantify a color temperature spectrum that may be used to describe a light's warmth or coolness. These numbers are used to characterize the hue of artificial light. Since each person has their own unique method of perceiving color, there are a variety of color temperatures that will work well for certain tasks according to this scale. Neutral and soft white is a friendly and clean light best for kitchens and bathrooms or any kind of workspace; cool light is adequate for offices, hospitals, and other commercial uses; and warm light creates a cozy, calm, inviting atmosphere that is ideal for bedrooms, living rooms, family rooms, dining rooms, and other spaces requiring an intimate, personal mood.

In terms of brain mechanisms, areas of the visual cortex (usually V4 and V8) are associated with color perception, while completely different regions of the brain (usually the amygdala and other limbic structures) are associated with emotions. However, fMRI studies have shown that tasks requiring color-emotional integration show strong bilateral activation in areas of the brain that connect the visual cortex with limbic areas, and this activation is shown to largely coincide with the activity of the Default mode network. Thus, the connection between colors and emotions at the brain level can be explained by the functioning of part of the Default mode network.

== Uses in marketing ==
Since color is an important factor in the visual appearance of products as well as in brand recognition, color psychology has become important to marketing. Recent work in marketing has shown that color may be used to communicate brand personality. Marketers must be aware of the application of color in different media (e.g. print vs. web), as well as the varying meanings and emotions that a particular audience assigns to color.

Even though there are attempts to classify consumer responses to different colors, everyone perceives color differently. The physiological and emotional effect of color in each person is influenced by several factors such as past experiences, culture, religion, natural environment, gender, ethnicity, and nationality. When making color decisions, it is important to determine the target audience in order to convey the right message. Color decisions can influence both direct messages and secondary brand values and attributes in any communication. Color should be carefully selected to align with the key message and emotions being conveyed in a marketing piece.

Research on the effects of color on product preference and marketing show that product color could affect consumer preference and hence purchasing culture. This is mostly due to associative learning. Most results show that no specific color attracts all audiences, but that certain colors are deemed appropriate for certain products.

=== Brand meaning ===
The Color Wheel

Color is a very influential source of information when people are making a purchasing decision. Customers generally make an initial judgment about a product within 90 seconds of interaction with that product and approximately 62–90% of that judgment is based on color. Customers often see the logo of a brand or company as a representation of that company. Without prior experience to a logo, association with a brand begins with certain characteristics based on the primary logo color. A widely recognized example is Tiffany & Co.'s use of "Tiffany Blue," a trademarked color that has become strongly associated with the brand's identity and luxury positioning.

Color mapping provides a means of identifying potential logo colors for new brands and ensuring brand differentiation within a visually cluttered marketplace.

A study on logo color asked participants to rate how appropriate the logo color was for fictional companies based on the products each company produced. Participants were presented with fictional products in eight different colors identified as either "functional" or "sensory-social" and they had to rate the appropriateness of the color for each product. This study showed a pattern of logo color appropriateness based on product type. If the product was considered functional, fulfills a need or solves a problem, then a functional color was seen as most appropriate. If the product was seen as sensory-social, conveys attitudes, status, or social approval, then sensory-social colors were seen as more appropriate.

Just the use of color may portray meaning to company logos, according to some research that determined that color affects people's perceptions of a new or unknown company. Some companies such as Victoria's Secret and H&R Block used color to change their corporate image and create a new brand personality for a specific target audience. Research conducted on the relationship between logo color and five personality traits had participants rate a computer-made logo in different colors on scales relating to the dimensions of brand personality. Relationships were found between color and sincerity, excitement, competence, sophistication, and ruggedness. A follow-up study tested the effects of perceived brand personality and purchasing intentions. Participants were presented with a product and a summary of the preferred brand personality and had to rate the likelihood of purchasing a product based on packaging color. It was determined that purchasing intent was greater if the perceived personality matched the marketed product or service and in turn, color affects perceived brand personality and brand personality affects purchasing intent.

Although color may be useful in marketing, its value and extent of use depends on how it is used and the targeted audience. The use of color will have different effects on different people, therefore experimental findings must not be taken as universally true.

=== Specific color meanings ===
Different colors are perceived to mean different things. For example, tones of red lead to feelings of arousal while blue tones are often associated with feelings of relaxation. Both of these emotions are pleasant, so therefore, the colors themselves can procure positive feelings in advertisements. The chart below gives perceived meanings of different colors in the United States.

Functional (F): fulfills a need or solves a problem

Sensory-Social (S): conveys attitudes, status, or social approval

Red	Yellow	Green	Blue	Pink	Violet/Purple	Orange	Brown	Black	White
Lust (S)	Competence (S)	Good Taste (F)	Sophistication (S)	Authority (S)	Warmth (S)	Ruggedness (S)	Grief (S)	Happiness (S)	Sincerity (S)
Power (S)	Happiness (S)	Envy (S)	Competence (S)		Sophistication (S)	Excitement (S)		Sophistication (S)	Purity (S)
Excitement (S)	Inexpensive (F)	Eco-Friendly (F)	High quality (F)	Feminine and Flirty (S)	Power (S)			Expensive (F)	
Love (S)	Low Quality (F)	Health (S)	Corporate (F)					Fear (S)	
Speed (S)		Money (F)	Reliability (F)						
Anger (S)									

==== Color meanings in cartography ====
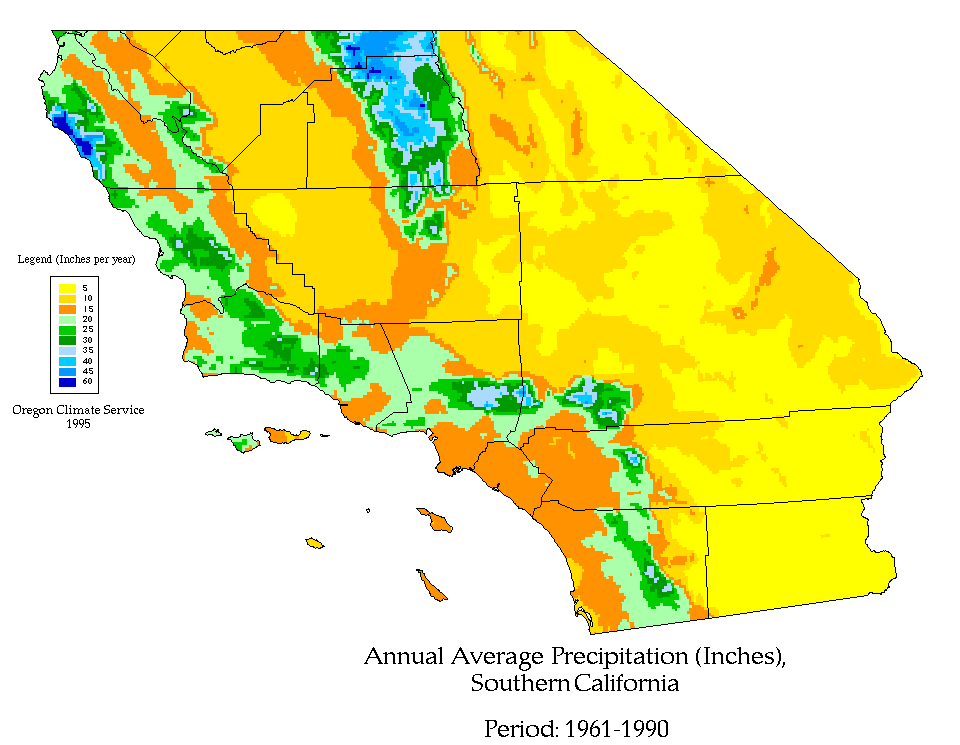
This map of precipitation leverages the natural connotations of blue as wet and yellow as dry, but readers have to make a conscious effort to not interpret green as vegetation.

In map design, additional color meanings are commonly employed to create intuitive map symbols, due to the natural colors of common geographic features. These correlations are commonly stylized and conventionalized, so that the color with the most intuitive meaning is often the nearest prototypical named color rather than that most similar to the real-world color (e.g., in very rare locations, water depth is symbolized using different shades of the color blue). Common, but by no means authoritative or exhaustive, examples include:

- Green: vegetation
- Blue: water (water bodies, precipitation), cold
- Gray/Black: human structures (roads, buildings)
- Brown: soil
- Yellow: dryness
- Red: heat, wildfire
- Purple: unnatural (contrasting with natural connotations of green, yellow, blue)

Other colors may have intuitive meaning due to their role in Gestalt psychology and other cognitive aspects of the map-reading process. For example, shades that contrast most with the background (i.e., dark on a white page, light on a dark screen) are naturally perceived as "more" (higher values of quantitative properties, more important in the Visual hierarchy) than shades with less contrast.

=== Combining colors ===
Target logo

Although some companies use a single color to represent their brand, many other companies use a combination of colors in their logo, and the combination may be perceived in different ways than those colors independently. When asked to rate color pair preference of preselected pairs, people generally prefer color pairs with similar hues when the two colors are both in the foreground; however, greater contrast between the figure and the background is preferred.

In contrast to a strong preference for similar color combinations, some study subjects demonstrate a preference for accenting with a highly contrasting color. In a study on color preference for Nike, Inc. sneakers, subjects generally combined colors near each other on the color wheel, such as blue and dark blue. However, a smaller segment preferred to have the Nike swoosh accentuated in a different, and contrasting, color. Most of the study subjects used a relatively small number of colors when designing their ideal athletic shoe. This finding has relevance for companies that produce multicolored merchandise, suggesting that to appeal to consumer preferences, companies should consider minimizing the number of colors visible and using similar hues in any one product.

=== Color name ===
Although different colors may be perceived in different ways, the names of those colors matters as well. These names are often called visual color descriptors. Many products and companies focus on producing a wide range of product colors to attract the largest population of consumers. For example, cosmetics brands produce a rainbow of colors for eye shadow and nail polish, to appeal to every type of client. Even companies such as Apple Inc. and Dell who make iPods and laptops do so with a certain amount of color personalization available to attract buyers. Moreover, the name given to a color by the marketer may attract or repel buyers as well. When asked to rate color swatches and products with either generic color names (such as brown) or "fancy" color names (such as mocha), participants rated items with fancy names as significantly more likable than items with generic names. In fact, the same paint color swatch with two different names produced different rating levels, and the same effect was found when participants rated the pleasantness of towels given fancy or generic color names, showing an overall pattern of preference for fancy color names more frequently than generic ones when describing exactly the same color.

In addition to fancy names being preferred for their aural appeal, they may contribute to the product they represent being liked more, and, therefore affecting sales. A yellow jelly bean with an atypical color name such as goldenrod is more likely to be selected than one with a more typical name such as lemon yellow. This could be due to greater interest in atypical names, as well as curiosity and willingness to "figure out" why that name was chosen. Purchasing intent patterns regarding custom sweatshirts from an online vendor also revealed a preference for atypical names. Participants were asked to imagine buying sweatshirts and were provided with a variety of color name options, some typical, some atypical. Color names that were atypical were selected more often than typical color names, again confirming a preference for atypical color names and for item descriptions using those names. Moreover, those who chose sweatshirts bearing atypical color names were described as more content with their purchase than those who selected similar items bearing typical color names.

=== Attracting attention ===
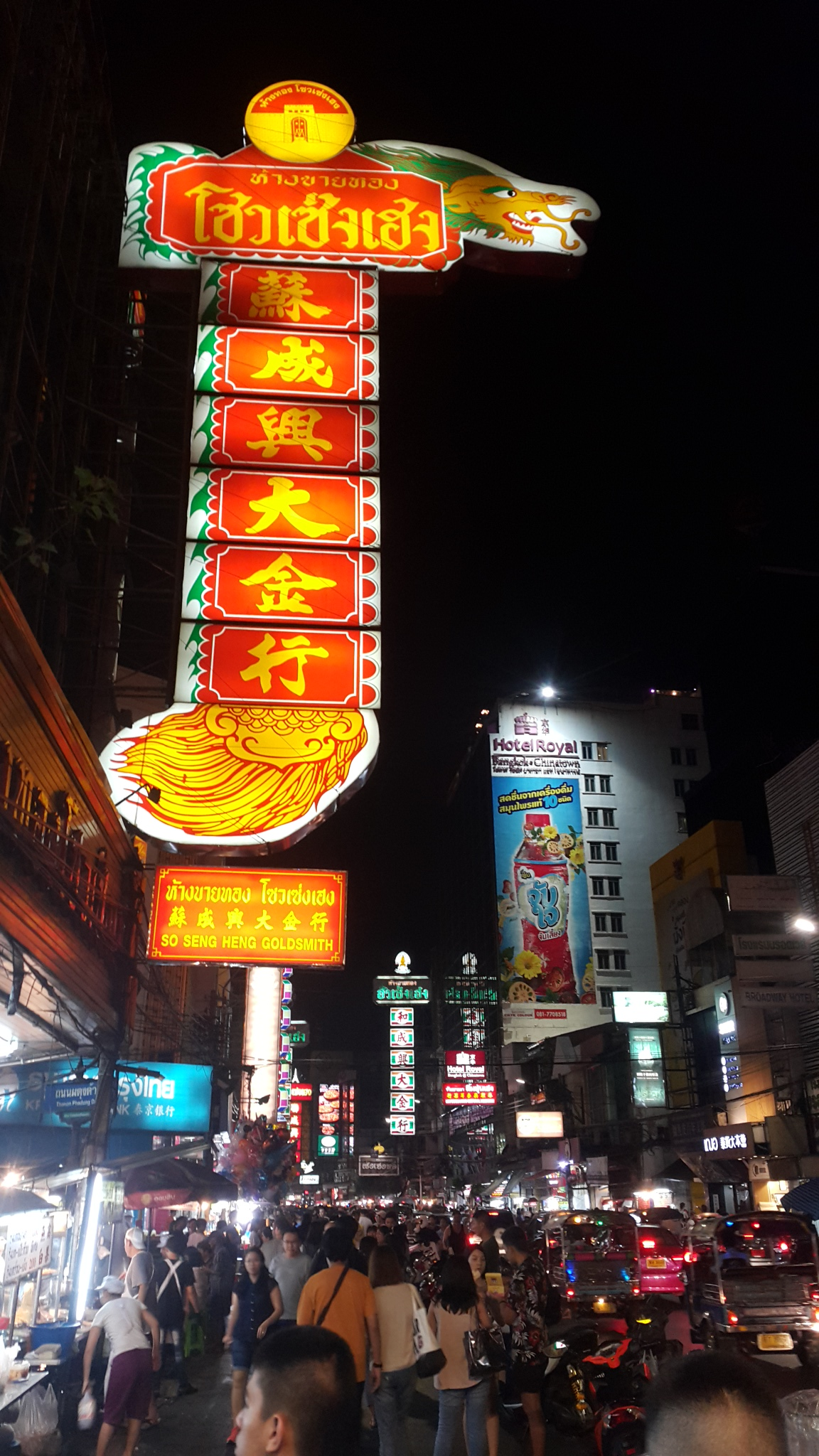
A store sign painted mainly red on a street in Bangkok to attract attention from passers-by

Color is used as a means to attract consumer attention to a product that then influences buying behavior. Consumers use color to identify for known brands or search for new alternatives. Variety seekers look for non-typical colors when selecting new brands. Attractive color packaging receives more consumer attention than unattractive color packaging, which can then influence buying behavior. A study that looked at visual color cues focused on predicted purchasing behavior for known and unknown brands. Participants were shown the same product in four different colors and brands. The results showed that study subjects picked packages based on colors that attracted their voluntary and involuntary attention. Associations made with that color such as 'green fits menthol', also affected their decision. Based on these findings implications can be made on the best color choices for packages. New companies or new products could consider using dissimilar colors to attract attention to the brand, but off-brand companies could consider using similar colors to the leading brand to emphasize product similarity. If a company is changing the look of a product, but keeping the product the same, they consider keeping the same color scheme since customers use color to identify and search for brands. This can be seen in Crayola crayons, where the logo has changed many times since 1934, but the basic package colors, gold and green, have been kept throughout.

Attention is captured subconsciously before study subjects consciously attend to something. Research looking at electroencephalography (EEGs) while subjects made decisions on color preference, found brain activation when a favorite color is present, before the participants consciously focused on it. When looking at various colors on a screen the subjects focused on their favorite color, or the color that stood out more, before they purposefully turned their attention to it. This implies that products can capture customer attention based on color, before they examine the product closely.

In interactive design and behavioral design, color is used to develop visual hierarchies where colors are placed into saliency hierarchies that match other hierarchies. Examples include matching a color hierarchy to a navigational structure hierarchy, or matching a behavioral science hierarchy to the most salient colors in a visual hierarchy, to increase the odds that important behavior change principles are noticed by a target audience and processed by them.

=== Store and display color ===
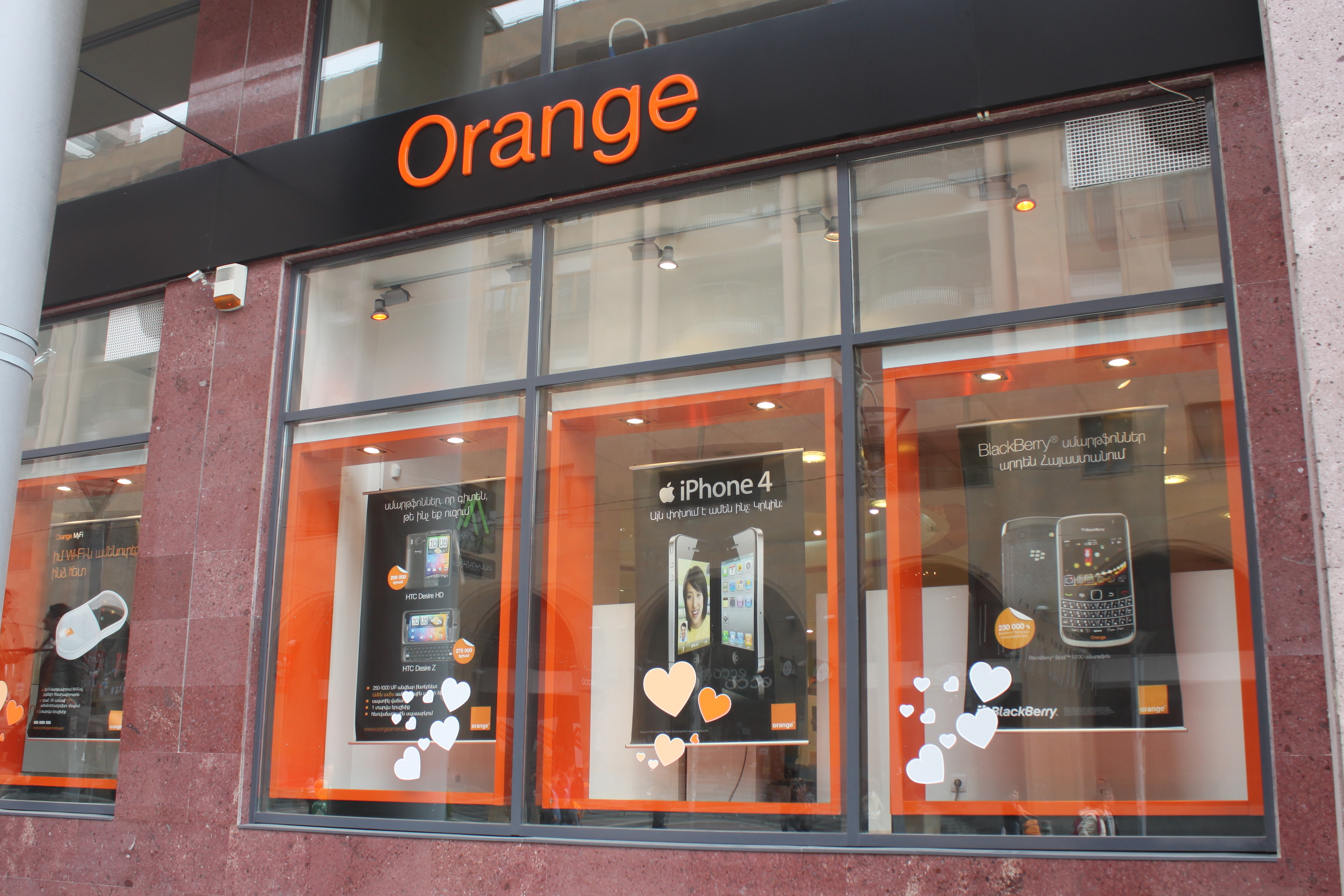
Warm colored window display

Color is not only used in products to attract attention, but also in window displays and stores. When study subjects are exposed to different colored walls and images of window displays and store interiors they tend to be drawn to some colors and not to others. Findings showed that subjects were physically drawn to warm colored displays; however, they rated cool colored displays as more favorable. This implies that warm colored store displays are more appropriate for spontaneous and unplanned purchases, whereas cool colored displays and store entrances may be a better fit for purchases where a lot of planning and customer deliberation occurs. This is especially relevant in shopping malls where patrons could easily walk into a store that attracts their attention without previous planning.

Other research has provided evidence that store color, not just the product, influences buying behaviors. When study subjects are exposed to different store color scenarios and then surveyed on intended buying behavior, among various other factors, store color is important for purchasing intentions. Blue, a cool color, was rated as more favorable and produced higher purchasing intentions than orange, a warm color. However, all negative effects to orange were neutralized when orange store color was paired with soft lighting. This shows that store color and lighting interact significantly. In this research, participants were not exposed to different colors of stores, but instead, color and lights were manipulated through the written description of the store.

== Applications for therapy ==
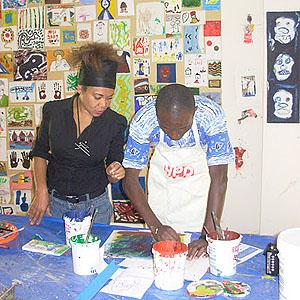
Art therapist Felicity Kodjo observes a patient during an art therapy workshop.

=== Art therapy ===
Art therapy is a separate but related field of applied psychology. It comes from psychoanalytic theories in the 1970s that argued that some of our emotions and experiences cannot be expressed in words alone, but in images and colors. One intersection where color psychology could be of use to art therapists is in evaluating what certain colors mean to clients when they use them to create art pieces. Even the lack of color use may be an important detail in art therapy, as people struggling with depression were shown to tend to use less color when they are painting. Research suggests that by focusing on color use rather than the resulting image made by a client, in order to start a dialogue about their feelings one may avoid client anxiety about producing a "good" product and focus more on what meaning the client assigns to the colors used.

=== Chromotherapy ===
Chromotherapy is a treatment method adapted from ancient color-based practices that uses wavelengths in the visual spectrum (colors we can see) to treat different conditions. This therapy has been researched to treat multiple physiological and psychiatric conditions, such as seasonal affective disorder (SAD), age-related cognitive decline, depression, and hypertension among others.

Many in the healthcare field believe that chromotherapy does not have a robust research backing and have described it as a pseudoscience. Other sources claim that while certain colors have been shown as beneficial to wellbeing, the clear definition of what wavelengths are beneficial and exactly how these benefits occur is not clear enough to put them to use in a medical setting.

== Individual differences ==
=== Gender ===
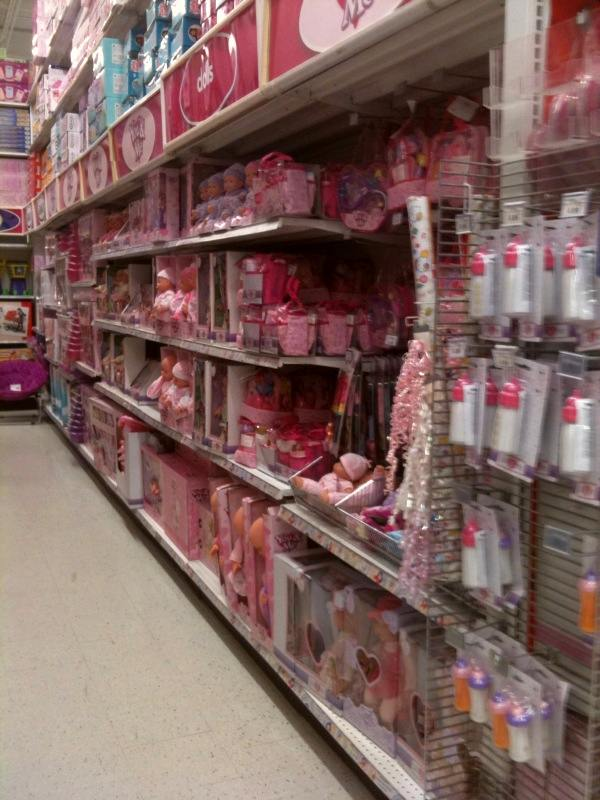
Pink girls section of toy store

Children's toys are often categorized as either boys or girls toys solely based on color. In a study on color effects on perception, adult participants were shown blurred images of children's toys where the only decipherable feature visible was the toy's color. In general participants categorized the toys into girl and boy toys based on the visible color of the image. This can be seen in companies interested in marketing masculine toys, such as building sets, to boys. For example, Lego uses pink to specifically advertise some sets to girls rather than boys. The classification of 'girl' and 'boy' toys on the Disney Store website also uses color associations for each gender. An analysis of the colors used showed that bold colored toys, such as red and black, were generally classified as 'boy only' toys and pastel colored toys, such as pink and purple, were classified as 'girl only' toys. Toys that were classified as both boy and girl toys took on 'boy only' toy colors. This again emphasizes the distinction in color use for children's toys.

Gender differences in color associations can also be seen amongst adults. Differences were noted for male and female participants, where the two genders did not agree on which color pairs they enjoyed the most when presented with a variety of colors. Men and women also did not agree on which colors should be classified as masculine and feminine. This could imply that men and women generally prefer different colors when purchasing items. Men and women also misperceive what colors the opposite gender views as fitting for them.

Gender has also shown to influence how colors are received, with some research suggesting women and men respectively prefer "warm" and "cool" colors. Black, white, and gray, as tones or shades, were shown to be received more positively by males than females.

=== Age ===
Children's toys for younger age groups are often marketed based on color, but as the age group increases, color becomes less gender-stereotyped. In general many toys become gender neutral and hence adopt gender-neutral colors. In the United States it is common to associate baby girls with pink and baby boys with blue. This difference in young children is a learned difference rather than an inborn one. Research has looked at the preference of young children, ages 7 months to 5 years, for small objects in different colors. The results showed that by the age of 2–2.5 years socially constructed gendered colors affects children's color preference, where girls prefer pink and boys avoid pink, but show no preference for other colors.

Contrary to the adult fondness for blue, in children yellow is the most favored color, perhaps owing to its associations with happiness. However, children like colors they find to be pleasant and comforting and their preferences don't change much, while adult color preference is usually easily influenced. Slightly older children who have developed a sense of favorite color often tend to pick items that are in that color.

Children's perceptions for color may be seen in a preference for a certain color of a food. The taste perceptions of all colors are not all the same with children and adults. "Each primary color has its own specific taste and the taste of secondary colors is a common taste of their constituent primary colors." Primary colors such as red and yellow, would indicate a similar taste when comparing pink and orange in a red/pink and yellow/orange pairing. It is perceived that infants prefer the pastel pinks and blues that are considered traditionally pleasant for a babies room. Busy patterns and strong colors in an infant's room is thought to contribute to hyperactivity, lack of sleep, and restlessness. Color priming and infants could be an example of acquired distinctiveness, which is one form of learning that suggests one source of information can predict the outcome, and any future associations with a color could be altered by the nature of this relation. Still, in other research, using pastels or neutral colors can affect the infant's perception to recognize color and give a better insight into their world of color psychology.

Ecological valence theory has been cited as a possible reason for differences in color preferences between adults and infants. Because adults have more associations between colors and objects or places from life experiences, their preferences change as they get older.

=== Culture ===
Many cultural differences exist on perceived color personality, meaning, and preference. When deciding on brand and product logos, companies should take into account their target consumer, since cultural differences exist. A study looked at color preference in British and Chinese participants. Each participant was presented with a total of 20 color swatches one at a time and had to rate the color on 10 different emotions. Results showed that British participants and Chinese participants differed on the like-dislike scale the most. Chinese participants tended to like colors that they self rated as clean, fresh, and modern, whereas British participants showed no such pattern. When evaluating purchasing intent, color preference affects buying behavior, where liked colors are more likely to be bought than disliked colors. This implies that companies should consider choosing their target consumer first and then make product colors based on the target's color preferences.

Wollard, (2000) seems to think that color can affect one's mood, but the effect also can depend on one's culture and what one's personal reflection may be. For example, someone from Japan may not associate red with anger, as people from the U.S. tend to do. Also, a person who likes the color brown may associate brown with happiness. However, Wollard does think that colors can make everyone feel the same, or close to the same, mood.

Studies have shown people from the same region, regardless of ethnicity, will have the same color preferences. Common associations connecting colors to a particular emotion may also differ cross-culturally. For instance, one study examined color relationships with emotion with participants in Germany, Mexico, Poland, Russia, and the United States; finding that red was associated with anger and viewed as strong and active. However, only Poles related purple with both anger and jealousy while Germans linked jealousy with yellow. This highlights how the influence of different cultures can potentially change perceptions of color and its relationship to emotion.

== Sports performance ==
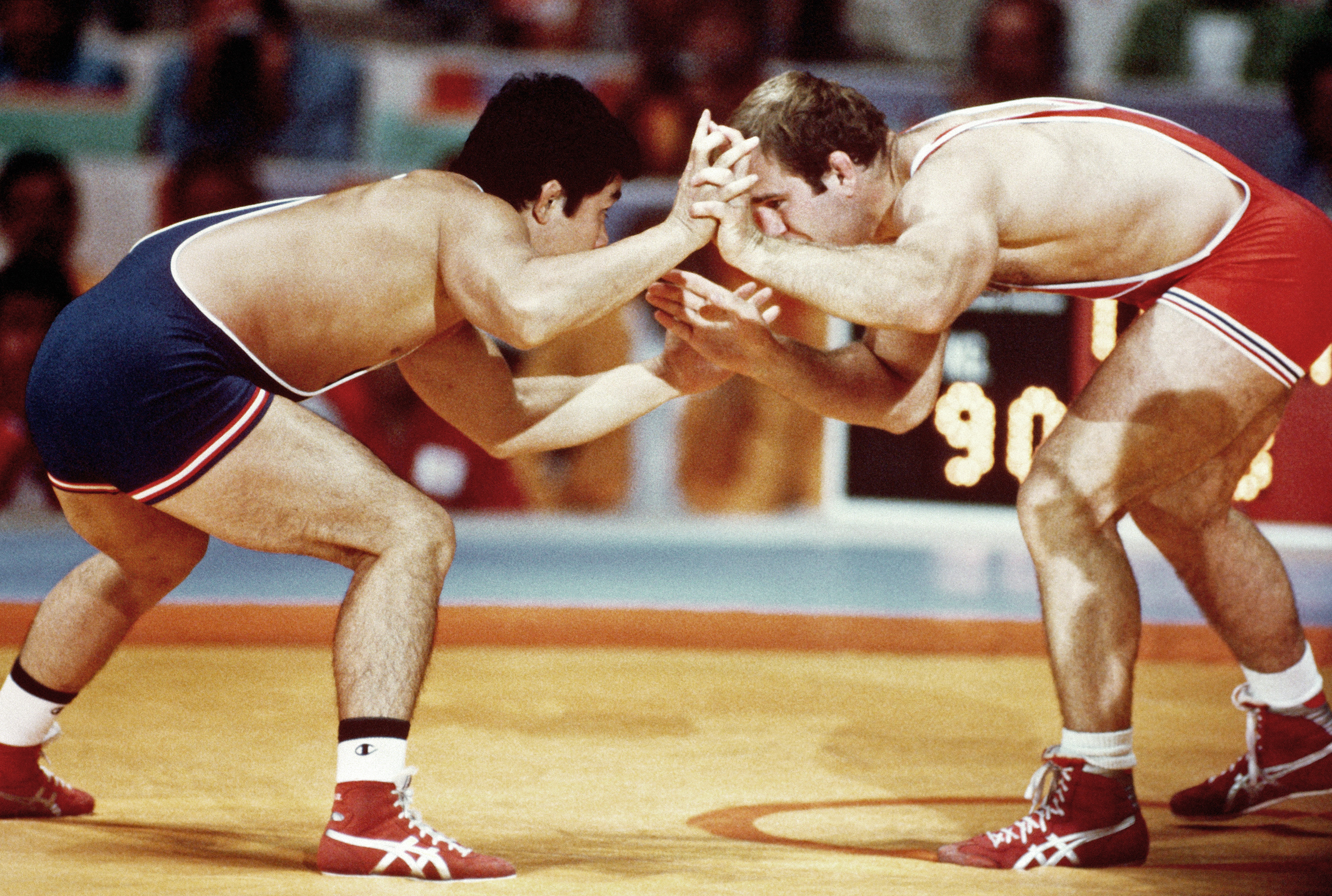
Ed Banach wrestles Akira Ohta during the 1984 Summer Olympics.

The color red has been found to influence sports performance. During the 2004 Summer Olympics the competitors in boxing, taekwondo, freestyle wrestling, and Greco-Roman wrestling were randomly given blue or red uniforms. A later study found that those wearing red won 55% of all their matches which was a statistically significant increase greater than the expected 50%. The colors affected bouts where the competitors were closely matched in ability, where those wearing red won 60% of the matches, but not matches between more unevenly matched competitors. In post-war England, football teams wearing red uniforms have averaged higher league positions and have had proportionally more championship winners than teams using other colors. In cities with more than one team, the teams wearing red outperformed the teams wearing other colors.

A study of the UEFA Euro 2004 found similar results. Another study found that those taking penalty kicks performed worst when the goalkeeper had a red uniform. More anecdotal is the historical dominance of the domestic honors by red-wearing teams such AFC Ajax, FC Bayern Munich, Liverpool F.C., and Manchester United F.C. Videos of taekwondo matches were manipulated in one study so that the red and blue colors of the protective gears were reversed. Both the original and the manipulated videos were shown to referees. The competitors wearing red were given higher scores despite the videos otherwise being identical.

Not only can color influence the players themselves in sports, but it can also influence other people's perceptions of the players. For example, one study demonstrates the effects of wearing various colored boxer trunks on the referees perception of the boxers. The results of the study indicated that competitors who wore red and black-colored trunks appeared stronger, more aggressive, and more dominant to the referee observing the match.

== Use in hospitals ==
At the turn of the 20th century, white was widely used in hospitals. In 1914, a surgeon in a San Francisco hospital, Harry Sherman, adopted green, "the complementary colour to hemoglobin" to avoid dazzle. This was adopted by a number of other American hospitals in the following decades. In 1916 Howard Kemp Prossor, a British art connoisseur, advanced a "colour cure" for shell shock. At around the same time, architect William Ludlow began to advocate pale pastel blues and greens in hospitals for therapeutic purposes and advising that "white is negative". In 1930, Dr. Charles Ireland of Guy's Hospital in London wrote Colour and Cancer, a book advocating the use of concentrated doses of colored light for treating cancer. The practice of using color in hospitals became widespread in the 1930s, particularly promoted by Faber Birren, who established himself as an "industrial color consultant" in 1934 and advised that an environment of soft colors, especially green, would be soothing for patients.

Red is perceived as a strong and active color which may influence both the person wearing it and others perceiving it. An evolutionary psychology explanation is that red may signal health as opposed to anemic paleness, or indicate anger due to flushing instead of paleness due to fear. It has been argued that detecting flushing may have influenced the development of primate trichromate vision. Primate studies have found that some species evaluate rivals and possible mates depending on red color characteristics. Facial redness is associated with testosterone levels in humans, and male skin tends to be redder than female skin.

== Gaming ==
Since color is such an important element in how people interpret their environment, color psychology can enhance the feeling of immersion in people that play video games. By using color psychology to cause immersion in players, players can have fewer errors playing video games in comparison to a game that does not utilize color psychology immersion.

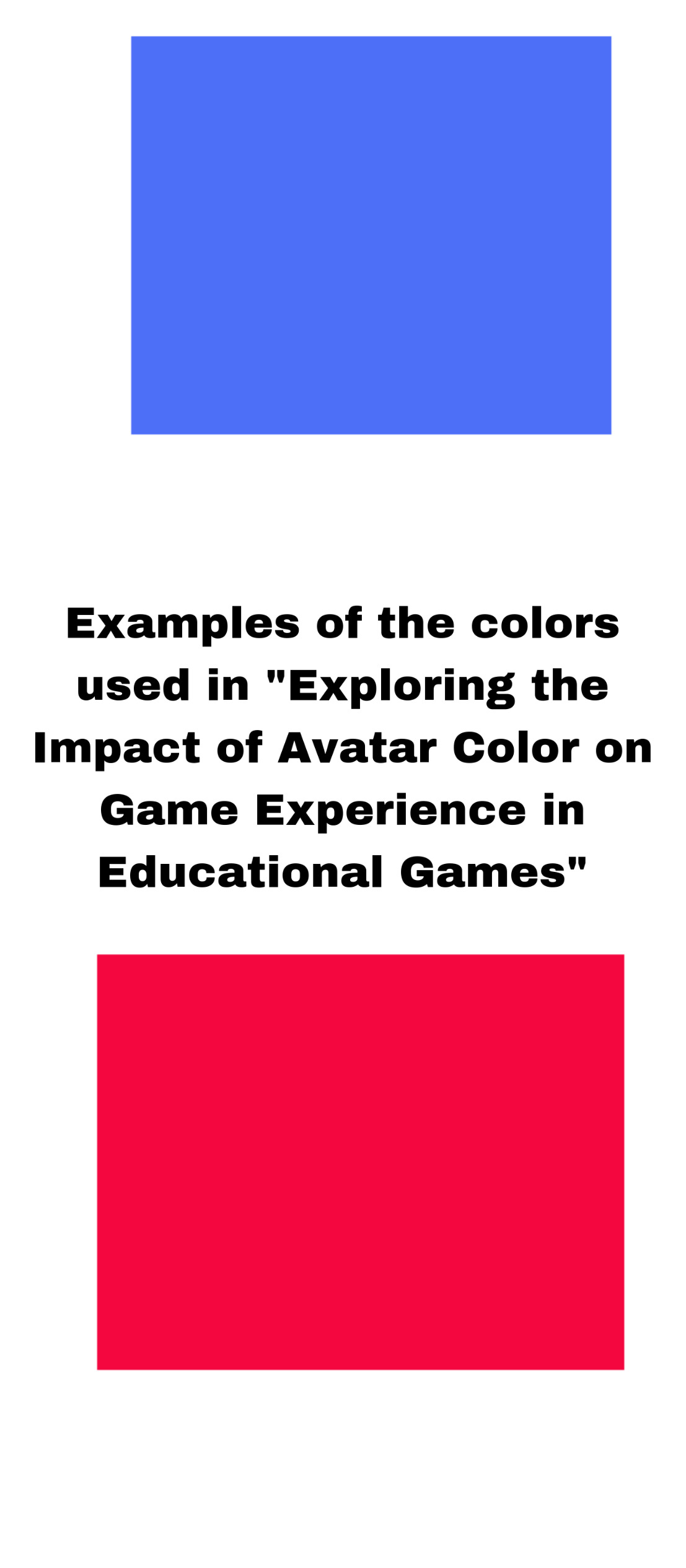
"The Impact of Avatar Color on Game Experience in Educational Games" color selector

Color psychology can even affect someone through the avatars they choose to use. A recent study from 2016 assessed the impact of avatar color on the gaming experience for educational games. The research compared two different color avatars; blue and red. They then measured the players using the avatars in terms of competence, immersion and flow. The study found that the players with the red avatar performed poorly compared to those with blue avatars. Another study on experienced players of first-person shooter games found that those assigned to wear red uniforms instead of blue won 55% of the matches.

Research also indicates that color in video games can elicit various emotions in the player. Feelings of joy and sadness were strongly associated with the brightness, value, saturation, chroma and lightness of the game being played. The greater the color saturation was in the video game, the more strongly felt these emotions were among the players. Less color saturation in the video game predicted higher feelings of fear.

== See also ==
- Color symbolism
- Color vision
- Kruithof curve
- Lüscher color test
- Visual perception
