= Max Lüscher =

Swiss psychotherapist (1923–2017)

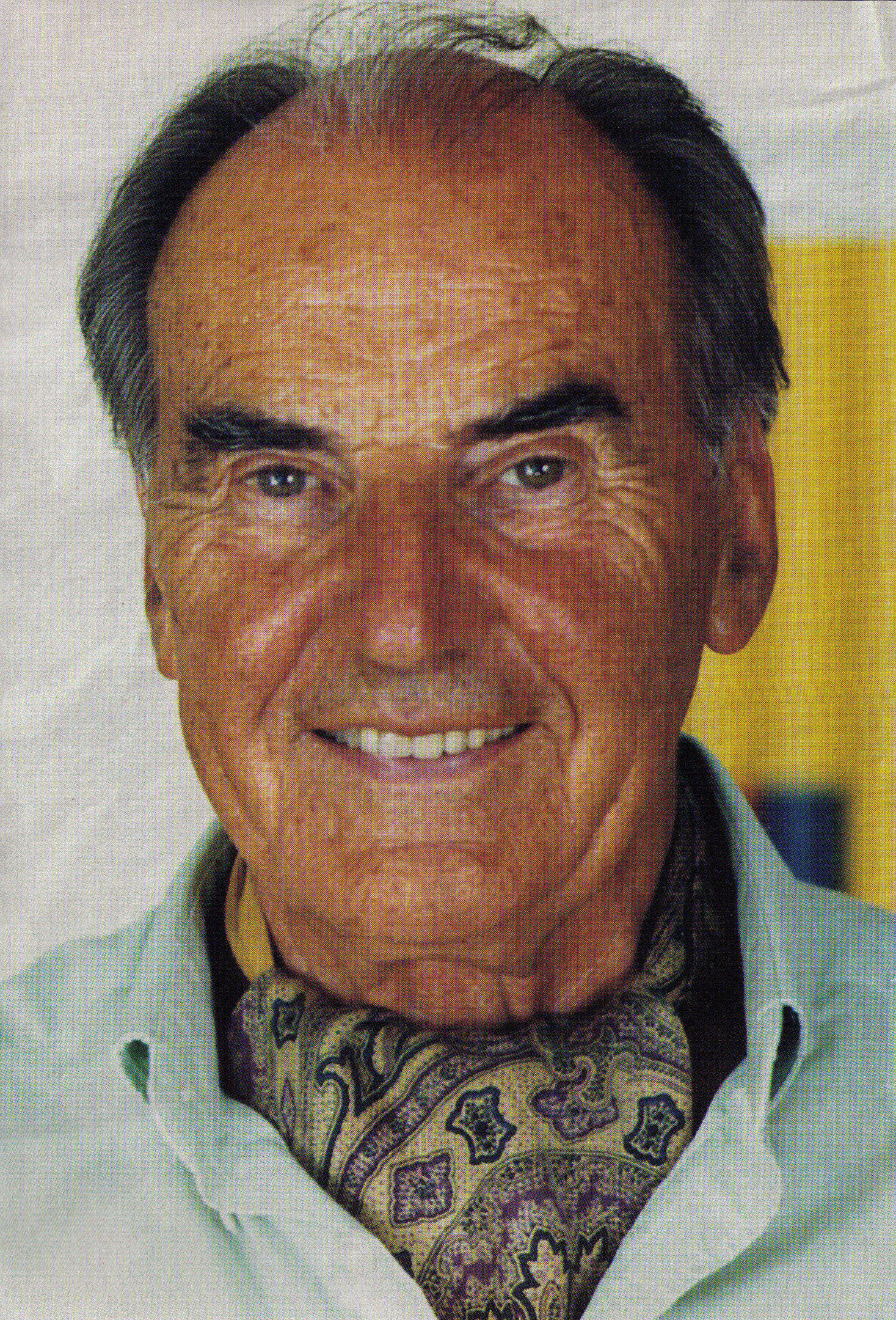
Lüscher in 2005

Max Lüscher (9 September 1923 – 2 February 2017) was a Swiss psychotherapist known for inventing the Lüscher color test, a tool for measuring an individual's psychophysical state based on their color preferences. Besides research, teaching and practicing psychotherapy in Basel, Lüscher worked for international companies, amongst other things giving color advice. His book The Lüscher Test has been translated into more than 30 languages.

== Biography ==
Max Lüscher was born in Basel, Switzerland on 9 September 1923. After receiving his Swiss "Matura", comparable to a diploma, he focused on studying psychiatry and achieved his doctorate in the areas of philosophy, psychology, and the philosophy of law. Lüscher completed his dissertation on "Color as an aid in psychological diagnosis". This project was chosen as the summa cum laude by his professors. After this, working as a psychotherapist, Lüscher created his first color test which was published in 1947. This test used color cards to determine the current emotional state of the test-taker. From 1961 to 1965, Lüscher lived in Berlin and continued his career as a psychotherapist. Lüscher was noted for his guest lectures and training seminars for physicians. The "Lüscher Color-Diagnostics" are now used in several universities across the world.

== The Lüscher test colors ==
The test colors from the Lüscher Color-Diagnosis chosen based on favoritism. The test-taker chooses the card color they like best and then orders the rest from most-preferred to least-preferred. Numbers are printed on the backside of each card, and after the test-taker orders them, the examiner turns them over and references an accompanying book that contains all of the different number combinations and their meaning. Lüscher argues that the subject's choice of color shows the state of their psychosomatic and emotional status and how they feel about themselves.

Lüscher relates to his four fundamental colors to the following fundamental categories:

- Blue: Contentment

Feeling of belonging, the inner connection and the relationship to one’s partner.
"How I feel towards a person that is close to me"

- Green: Self-respect

Inner control of willpower and the capacity to enjoy.
"The way I want to be"

- Red: Self confidence

Activity, drive and the reaction to challenges.
"How I react to challenges"

- Yellow: Development

Attitude of anticipation, attitude towards future development and towards new encounters.
"What I expect for the future"

A 1984 comparison of the Lüscher color test and the Minnesota Multiphasic Personality Inventory found little agreement between the two tests, prompting the authors to urge cautious use of the former.

== Bibliography ==
- Max Lüscher: „The Lüscher Colour Test", Remarkable Test That Reveals Your Personality Through Color, Pan Books, 1972, ISBN 978-0-330-02809-7
- Max Lüscher: „Color - the mother tongue of the unconscious", Capsugel N.V. (1973)
- Max Lüscher: „The 4-Color Person", Pocketbooks, Simon Schuster, 1979, ISBN 0-671-83457-6
- Max Lüscher, „Colors of Love" : Getting in Touch with Your Romantic Self, St. Martin's Press, New York, 1996, ISBN 978-0-312-14295-7
- Max Lüscher: „The Luscher Profile", Mindscape (1986), ASIN B000WY2OU8
- Max Lüscher: „Personality Signs", Warner Books, 1981, ISBN 978-0-446-81317-4
- Max Lüscher: „Der Lüscher-Test. Persönlichkeitsbeurteilung durch Farbwahl", Rowohlt, Reinbek, 1985, ISBN 3-498-03812-5
- Max Lüscher: „Das Harmoniegesetz in uns", Ullstein, 2003, ISBN 3-548-36656-2
- Max Lüscher: „Der Vier-Farben-Mensch", Ullstein, 2005, ISBN 3-548-36797-6
