= Lantern laws =

Lantern laws refer to the 18th-century legal code in New York City that mandated Black, mixed race, and Indigenous people carry candle lanterns while walking the streets after dark and not in company of a white person.

== Interpretations in Black studies ==
University of Texas at Austin Professor Simone Browne's 2015 book Dark Matters: On the Surveillance of Blackness argues that the history of the policing of Black people in and after the institution of chattel slavery remains central to contemporary technologies and practices of surveillance. Browne argues that the candle lantern is an early example of a "supervisory technology", noting that the law carried a number of possible punishments for individuals caught walking without one of these illuminating apparatuses. Furthermore, she points out that during this period, any white person was deputized to stop any Black, mixed race, or Indigenous person they found in violation of the mandate. Browne proposes that this precedent, first devised and implemented during the colonial era, established the "legal framework for stop-and-frisk policing practices... long before our contemporary era".

R. Joshua Scannell's City University of New York dissertation "Electric Light: Automating the Carceral State During the Quantification of Everything," extends Browne's work to connect Lantern Laws in the past with the NYPD's present-day militarization of "high-intensity artificial lights, flood lights or the flashing roof lights from the police cars throughout the night in certain housing projects" which "[subject] people to violent illumination".

The artist Kapwani Kiwanga has explored the history of forced illumination in her work.
