= Vollebak =

British clothing brand

- Industry: Clothing
- Founders: Steve Tidball; Nick Tidball
- Headquarters: London
- Products: Clothing; Sportswear

Vollebak is a British clothing brand specialising in men's sportswear and adventure clothing. The brand was launched in 2016 by twin brothers and former advertising creatives Nick and Steve Tidball (born 1979), and the company headquarters is located in London.

In December 2015 the company's Relaxation Hoodie was worn by Jon Glaser and Jimmy Fallon on The Tonight Show Starring Jimmy Fallon.

In August 2018 Vollebak created a jacket coated in graphene and in May 2020 a jacket made primarily from copper.

According to a Russian magazine, writing about the 100 Year Hoodie "Beat the elements: it now repels rain, wind, snow as well as fire." The brand advertises the hoodie as "Highly durable and abrasion resistant, it’s also water repellent, stretchy and fireproof."

As of November 24, 2021, the brand has raised $10 million in outside funding, including a Series A round led by London-based venture firm Venrex, with participation from Airbnb co-founder Joe Gebbia and Headspace CFO Sean Brecker.

In 2022 Vollebak received an undisclosed amount from the BFC Venrex Fashion Fund.

== Awards ==
- The Solar Charged Jacket was included in the TIME Magazine Best Inventions list in 2018
- The Graphene Jacket was a finalist in Fast Company's Innovation by Design awards 2019
- The Plant and Algae T Shirt received an honorable mention in Fast Company Magazine's World Changing Ideas awards 2020
- The Full Metal Jacket was included in the TIME Magazine Best Inventions list in 2020
