= Andrew J. Elliot =

American social psychologist

Andrew J. Elliot (born 1962) is an American social psychologist, professor of psychology at the University of Rochester. His research on the hierarchical model of approach and avoidance motivation focuses on combining classic and contemporary methods to test various theories. Elliot's work in social psychology is cited frequently by those in the field, causing him to be named one of Thomson Reuters' ISI Highly Cited for the Social Sciences in 2010.

Elliot received his B.A in 1985 at Taylor University in Indiana, and then went on to secure a Ph.D. in social-personality psychology at the University of Wisconsin–Madison in 1994. He has served on the editorial boards of multiple psychological journals, and he is currently editor of Advances in Motivation Science and consulting editor to the Journal of Educational Psychology, the Journal of Personality, and the Personality and Social Psychology Review. He was also the Churchill Fellow at Cambridge University in 2010, and has served as the visiting senior fellow at Jesus College in Oxford University during the 2013–2014 academic year. He was awarded the 2003 Friedrich Wilhelm Bessel Research award for mid-career contributions to Psychology, and 2013 Ed and Carol Diener Award for Outstanding Contributions to Personality Psychology. He is the recipient of several grants to continue his work from many research foundations including Institute of Education Sciences and the Humboldt Foundation.

Elliot's research focuses have had many different facets, although his primary focus is on achievement motivation and approach-avoidance motivation more generally.

== Selected works ==
=== Books ===
- Elliot, A.J. (2008) Handbook of Approach and Avoidance Motivation New York: Taylor and Francis Group.
- Elliot, A.J. and Dweck, Carol S. (2005) Handbook of Competence and Motivation New York: The Guildford Press.

=== Papers ===
- Korn, R. M., & Elliot, A. J. (2016). The 2 × 2 Standpoints Model of Achievement Goals. Frontiers in Psychology, 7(May), 1–12.
- Roskes, M., Elliot, A.J., Nijstad, B., & De Dreu, C.K.W. (2013). Avoidance motivation and conservation of energy. Emotion Review, 5, 264–268.
- Law, W., Elliot, A.J., & Murayama, K. (2012). Perceived competence moderates the relation between performance-approach and performance-avoidance goals. Journal of Educational Psychology, 104, 806–819.
- Murayama, K., & Elliot, A.J. (2011). Achievement motivation and memory: Achievement Goals differentially influence immediate and delayed remember-know recognition memory. Personality and Social Psychology Bulletin, 37, 1339–1348.
