= Shame (band) =

British five-piece post-punk band

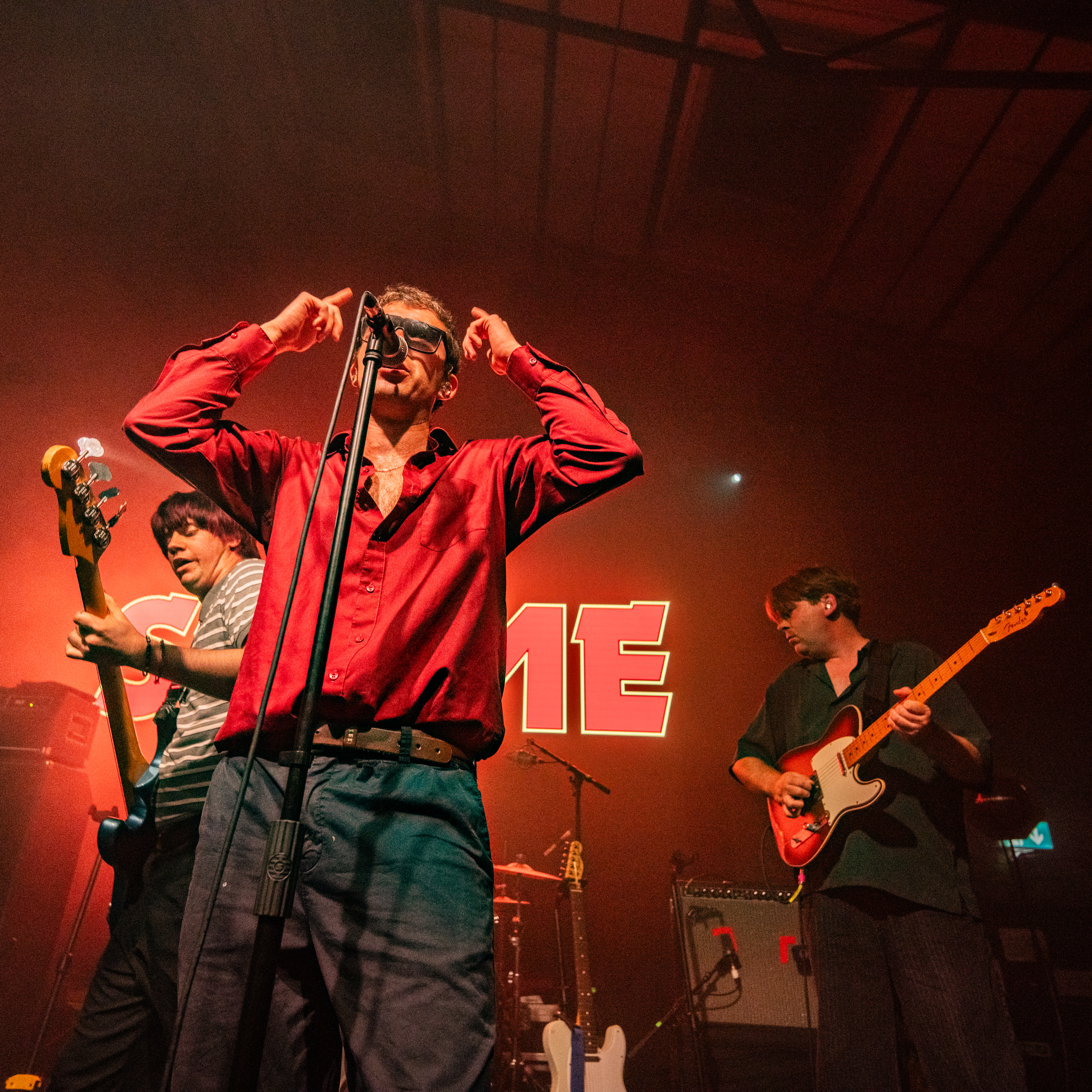
- At Village Underground during SXSW London, June 2026

Background information
- Origin: South London, England
- Genres: Post-punk, indie rock
- Years active: 2014–present
- Label: Dead Oceans
- Members: Eddie Green; Charlie Forbes; Josh Finerty; Sean Coyle-Smith; Charlie Steen
- Website: shame.world

Shame (stylised in all lowercase as shame) are a British five-piece post-punk band from South London. Formed in 2014, the group consists of lead vocalist Charlie Steen, guitarists Eddie Green and Sean Coyle-Smith, bassist Josh Finerty, and drummer Charlie Forbes. They are affiliated with the Windmill scene in their native Brixton, along with other South London post-punk bands such as Black Midi and Squid.

Signed to Dead Oceans, the band's debut album Songs of Praise was released on 12 January 2018. This was followed by Drunk Tank Pink on 15 January 2021, which debuted at number eight on the UK Albums Chart. The band's third album Food for Worms was released on 24 February 2023. The band released their fourth album Cutthroat on 5 September 2025. The group has received positive reviews from publications including NME, Paste, and Clash.

== History ==
Shame originated at Queen's Head pub in Brixton, where Charlie Forbes' dad coined the term for the band's name.The band began writing music while still in secondary school, producing their 2014 EP Gone Fisting, and started recording their first album in their early twenties.

Shame released their debut album, Songs of Praise, on 12 January 2018 through Dead Oceans. The record holds an aggregated score of 83 based on 20 reviews. The album spent two weeks on the U.K. Albums Chart and peaked at No. 32. The performance of the album would lead to the band's first main stage spot at a major festival, when they performed at Reading and Leeds on 26 August later that year.

In late January 2020, NME reported that Shame was working on their second studio album and that recording had been completed. On 18 November 2020, the band confirmed that their second studio album, entitled Drunk Tank Pink, would come out 15 January 2021, a little more than three years after their debut album. In December 2020, shame released the single "Snow Day" with an accompanying visualiser.

In November 2022, the band announced their third album accompanied with a new single "Fingers of Steel", followed by later tracks "Six-Pack" and "Adderall" prior to the album's release. The album, Food for Worms, was released on 24 February 2023.The band performed at the Glastonbury Festival on 24 June that year, with a setlist including songs from the new album.

Shame released their fourth studio album, Cutthroat, on 5 September 2025.

== Influences ==
Shame have cited influences including Gilla Band, Talking Heads, the Fall, the Sound, Television, U2, Smashing Pumpkins, Dinosaur Jr., Pavement, Nirvana, the Cramps, Dr. Feelgood, Roxy Music, the Chemical Brothers, the Beatles, David Bowie, Lou Reed, the Velvet Underground, Country Teasers, Mannequin Pussy and the Pixies.

== Members ==
- Charlie Steen – lead vocalist
- Eddie Green – guitarist
- Sean Coyle-Smith – guitarist
- Josh Finerty – bassist
- Charlie Forbes – drummer

== Discography ==
=== Studio albums ===
Title	Album details	Peak chart positions							Certifications (sales thresholds)
Title	Album details	UK	UK Indie	UK Vinyl	BEL (FL)	BEL (WA)	NLD	SCO	Certifications (sales thresholds)
Songs of Praise	Released: 12 January 2018; Label: Dead Oceans; Formats: CD, digital download, LP	32	5	1	42	175	94	41	
Drunk Tank Pink	Released: 15 January 2021; Label: Dead Oceans; Formats: CD, digital download, LP	8	3	2	23	107	97	6	
Food for Worms	Released: 24 February 2023; Label: Dead Oceans; Formats: CD, digital download, LP	21	2	2	54	167	—	9	
Cutthroat	Released: 5 September 2025; Label: Dead Oceans; Formats: CD, digital download, LP	86	8	10	—	—	—	19	

=== Live albums ===
Title	Album details
Live at Génériq Festival 17-2-17, Dijon	Released: 22 April 2018; Label: Dijon (001); Formats: Cassette
Live Sermons	Released: 12 January 2018; Label: Dead Oceans (DOC144BONUS); Formats: Promo CD
Live In The Flesh	Released: 19 April 2021; Label: Dead Oceans; Formats: Digital download, vinyl (limited edition)

=== EPs ===
Title	EP details
Gone Fisting	Released: 23 November 2014; Label: Self-released (Shame001); Formats: CD

=== Singles ===
Title	Year	Album
"Gold Hole"	2016	Songs of Praise
"The Lick"	2016	Songs of Praise
"Tasteless"	2017	Songs of Praise
"Visa Vulture"	2017	Non-album single
"Concrete"	2017	Songs of Praise
"One Rizla"	2017	Songs of Praise
"Alphabet"	2020	Drunk Tank Pink
"Water in the Well"	2020	Drunk Tank Pink
"Snow Day"	2020	Drunk Tank Pink
"Nigel Hitter"	2021	Drunk Tank Pink
"This Side of the Sun"	2021	Non-album singles
"Baldur’s Gate"	2021	Non-album singles
"Fingers of Steel"	2022	Food for Worms
"Six-Pack"	2022	Food for Worms
"Adderall" + "Slimbo"	2023	Food for Worms
"Cutthroat"	2025	Cutthroat
