= Lüscher color test =

Discredited psychological test

The Lüscher color test is a psychological test invented by Max Lüscher in Basel, Switzerland, first published in 1947 in German and first translated to English in 1969. The simplest form of the test instructs a subject to order a series of 8 colors in order of preference. This test claims that the order of preference can reveal characteristics of the subject's personality, but many modern psychologists consider it to be an example of the Barnum effect, where vague statements are assumed to be more meaningful then they actually are. The simplicity of the test has allowed it to be heavily tested.

== History ==
Lüscher developed his color test during his doctoral studies at the University of Basel. He first published the idea at the first World Congress of Psychology in Lausanne in 1947 and later as his thesis in 1949, titled "Color as a Psychological Means of Examination". After expanding and publishing his ideas throughout the next 2 decades, the test gained widespread popularity as it was first translated to English in the 1969 + 1971 editions.

== Methodology ==
In the simple (short, or 8-color) test, as published in 1969, a subject is presented with 8 cards, each containing a color. The colors include 4 "basic" (blue, yellow, red, green) and "auxiliary" (violet, brown, grey, and black) colors. The subject is instructed to select the color that they "like best" or "feel the most sympathy" toward. This selection is performed iteratively with the remaining colors until all the colors have been ordered by preference. The order is recorded, with each color corresponding to a numerical value, 0-7.

A series of symbols are applied to the results (in pairs) to indicate the subject's relationship to the color, where:

Symbol	Relationship	Choice
+	strong preference	1st & 2nd
×	sympathetic	3rd & 4th
=	indifference	5th & 6th
−	rejection	7th & 8th

For each symbol, the color pair can then be analyzed individually. For example, +0+7 (a strong preference for gray and black) indicates that the subject:

...feels he has been unjustly and undeservedly treated and betrayed in his hopes [and is] disgruntled and in revolt against his existing circumstances which he considers and affront.

Finally, a 5th pair comprising the first and last colors can be analyzed (e.g. +0-5). Each combination gives a percentage for how often it was chosen in Lüscher's prior tests of 36,892 students. Stars are also sometimes indicated, where a high number of accumulated stars can be interpreted as a potential psychological disorder. The test can then be repeated. If the second test run differs from the first, it is assumed that the latter is more spontaneous and therefore more authentic.

Alternatively, the full test can also be used, but this was only published by Lüscher in German and was not included as part of the initial English translations.

== Psychological basis ==
Lüscher believed that sensory perception of color is objective and universally shared by all, but that color preferences are subjective, and that this distinction allows subjective states to be objectively measured by using test colors. Lüscher believed that because the color selections are guided in an unconscious manner, they reveal the person as they really are, not as they perceive themselves or would like to be perceived.

Lüscher believed that personality traits could be identified based on one's choice of color. Therefore, subjects who select identical color combinations have similar personalities. In order to measure this, he conducted a test in which subjects were shown 8 different colored cards and asked to place them in order of preference. Colors are divided between "basic" (blue, yellow, red, green) and "auxiliary" (violet, brown, grey, and black).

Colors	Meanings
Blue	"Depth of feeling" passive, concentric, tranquility, calm, tenderness
Green	"Elasticity of will" passive, concentric, defensive, persistence, self-esteem/assertion, pride, control
Red (Note: The color is often called orange-red and is described as being more orange than red, despite the affective values applied to it being inline with associations with true red in other studies.)	"Force of will" excentric, active aggressive, competitive, action, desire, excitement, sexuality
Yellow	"Spontaneity" excentric, active, projective, aspiring, expectancy, exhilaration
Violet	"Identification" unrealistic/wishful fulfillment, charm, enchantment
Brown	Bodily senses, indicates the body's condition
Black	Nothingness, renunciation, surrender or relinquishment
Grey	Non-involvement and concealment

After subjects placed the cards in order from most liked to least liked, they were asked to evaluate the extent to which their personalities matched the descriptive statements formed by Lüscher of each color.

The results of the Lüscher color diagnostic contain indications pertaining to personal assessment and special, professional recommendations as to how psychological stress and the resulting physical symptoms can be avoided. It also offers additional information for verbal and homeopathic therapy.

== Criticism ==
The test ranks high on a published list of discredited procedures in psychology. It lacks construct validity and is considered as example of the Barnum effect, where an ostensible personality analysis (actually consisting of vague generalities applicable to the majority of people) is reported to be accurate by subjects who had completed a personality test before reviewing their "results". A 1984 comparison of the Lüscher color test and the Minnesota Multiphasic Personality Inventory (MMPI) found little agreement between the two tests, prompting the authors to urge cautious use of the former. Some still stand up for the Lüscher color test as providing high accuracy in a non-verbal test involving as few as eight colors, especially in children, even though the majority of the scientific community puts it high on discredited tests lists.

Most validation studies do not find the Lüscher color test to be meaningful, but one validation study has recommended it as a possible pre-screening for Taylor–Johnson Temperament Analysis.

The original English translation contains an extensive bibliography supporting the test. However, an analysis of the references found that many of them do not even exist.

== Applications ==
The Lüscher color test has been applied to the assessment of criminality.

== See also ==
- Personality psychology
- Rorschach test
