= Windmill scene =

British musical scene

- Other names: Speedy scene; gristle rock
- Stylistic origins: Art rock; experimental rock; post-punk; progressive rock; post-rock
- Cultural origins: Mid–2010s, London, particularly Brixton

Other topics
- Crank wave; Speedy Wunderground; sprechsang; Queen's Head; Chunk

The Windmill scene (also known as the Speedy scene or gristle rock) is a musical scene based around the Windmill pub in Brixton, London, that emerged during the mid–2010s. The term is usually identified with a blend of experimental rock and post-punk, featuring erratic, spoken vocals as well as inspiration from genres such as progressive rock and post-rock. A key figure in the scene's formation is producer Dan Carey, who signed many Windmill bands to his record label, Speedy Wunderground, which has also given it the name Speedy scene. The term "Windmill indie" has been used synonymously with "post-Brexit new wave" and "crank wave".

Among the bands described as being part of the scene are Black Midi, Black Country, New Road, Squid, Shame, HMLTD, the Last Dinner Party, Sorry, Fat White Family, Heartworms, Goat Girl, PVA, Maruja, and occasionally, Fontaines D.C..

== Etymology ==
The name "Windmill scene" is in reference to the Brixton pub venue the Windmill, a central venue to the scene. Coda Radio noted it as based broadly in Brixton, rather than only the Windmill. In 2019, NME writer Mark Beaumont named the scene "gristle rock", describing it as "art-sleaze-punk-freak. In 2024, he described the style as "gruesome post-punk, torture-chamber Velvets and twisted rock'n'roll".

The term "Windmill indie" has been used synonymously with "post-Brexit new wave" and "crank wave". Matthew Perpetua of NPR explained the term, writing "For one thing, there's no getting around how much of this music is a direct response to the social dynamics of post-Brexit England... The politics aren't always foregrounded, but there's an unmistakable feeling of shame, disappointment and pessimism about Britain's future permeating all of this music". Nonetheless, Black Midi bassist Cameron Picton criticised the term in an article in 2022, saying "I don't think there's actually any bearing of Brexit on any of our music. And if you were going to call anything post-Brexit, it would be the bands that are starting out now, maybe". Picton also stated in April 2026 that he didn't think the label "Windmill scene" accurately encompassed the diversity of bands and musicians operating in London.

== Characteristics ==
The Windmill scene encompasses a wide variety of experimental sounds, generally with some roots in post-punk. Of its most prominent acts, Clash noted Black Midi as jazz rock, Black Country, New Road as chamber pop and Squid as art rock. Many of the musicians first became interested in music through the post-punk revival, but developed their own musical identities. Clash also noted a higher frequency of women performers than was traditional in post-punk, as well as calling it "some of the most interesting music the country’s heard for a very long time".

The Independent, writer Kieran Read noted post-rock as a common influence, and that their connections are mostly social factors, particularly performing at the Windmill and working with producer Dan Carey. However Rolling Stone noted that as early as 2021 the label was being applied as a musical category to bands with little connection to the Windmill, such as English Teacher. Publications such as Clash have noted crank wave as a ubiquitous sound of the Windmill scene, however Kieran Read argued that although the Windmill scene bands were often compared, "they don’t actually sound all that alike" and that of them, only Black Midi were a defining crank wave band. KRUI-FM noted the sound of the Windmill scene is defined by bands fusing crank wave and the Louisville post-rock sound.

Many of the bands in the scene were influenced by Edinburgh band Country Teasers, with Goat Girl lead vocalist and guitarist Lottie Pendlebury stating in a 2018 interview of their vocalist Ben Wallers, "The whole weird South London ‘scene’ that everyone is always ranting on about is because of him completely. Every single band that I know [is inspired by him]. I don’t think he even knows it... He’s an idol. He follows this idea that a lot of comedians do, in this satirical way. It’s funny, but also really important to have that tongue-in-cheek humour about something completely disastrous."

== History ==
=== Origins at the Queen's Head (2011–2015) ===
In the early 2010s, Fat White Family helped to establish a post-punk scene based around the Queen's Head, Brixton

During the early to mid-2010s, Brixton pub and venue the Queen's Head, began to grow a post-punk scene. In an article by The Independent, Mark Beaumont called Fat White Family "the original agitators of the post-everything south London art rock scene". In 2017, Clash stated "most bands blossoming in South London [have] a deep-rooted connection to the Fat White Family". Members of Fat White Family lived and rehearsed at the pub. Shame drummer Charlie Forbes had grown up attending the pub with his father, who was friends with its landlord. Upon the formation of the band, they were offered a practice space at the venue for free. Both Shame and Fat White Family would organised the live music nights. Fat White Family's night was Slide-In, which hosted acts including Childhood, Jerkcurb and King Krule, with Fat White Family also frequently performing. Shame organised Chimney Shitters which hosted HMLTD, Goat Girl and Sorry.

The venue helped Shame and Fat White Family gain connections with other London bands, by 2015 forming a scene that also included HMLTD, Goat Girl, Dead Pretties, Sorry and Yowl. The scene arose as a part of the 2010s post-punk revival. In the community, scenesters were allowed mostly free rein of the building, with a 2013 article by the Guardian noting Fat White Family as "More than regulars, not quite employees, they rehearse here, sleep here when homeless – which appears to be quite often – and occasionally help out behind the bar." Loud And Quiet noted it as a doss-house. The pub's patrons would share instruments, with Shame being given their first drum kit and microphone by Rumer, as well as being frequented by members of Alabama 3 and Stiff Little Fingers, who would give the bands advice on maneuvering the record industry. However, it was also a location of frequent use of elicit substances, particularly heroin and crack cocaine.

The scene gained national headlines in 2013 when Fat White Family climbed onto the Queen's Head's roof holding a banner saying "The Witch is Dead" in celebration of the death of Margaret Thatcher, former Conservative Party Prime Minister of the United Kingdom. In 2019, Louder Than War described the Queen's Head as "the breeding ground and birthplace of cutting edge acts like the Fat White Family and Shame, and the scene of some of the wildest and most hedonistic parties".

In 2015, the landlord of the Queen's Head forfeited its lease, leading it to be purchased by new owners. It closed for a few months, reopening as a gastropub whose prices were too high for much of the community that had spawned around it.

=== Relocation to the Windmill (2015–2017) ===
Because of the closure of the Queen's Head, Shame relocated their live night to the Windmill, leading much of the Queen's Head scene to begin attending the venue

Historically, the arts in London were mostly based in North London, and venues in the West End of London enforced an "exclusive" and "hierarchical" booking system that alienated many groups. In South London, the Windmill instead operated an "open-door philosophy", which allowed a diverse array of performers. The venue opened in 1971, then relaunched in 1992, when it became a fixture of the city's Irish traditional music scene. By 2000, the Irish scene had mostly declined, leading promoter Tim Perry to pivot its focus towards the growing prevalence of indie rock. During this time, it hosted performances by Bloc Party, Florence and the Machine, Hot Chip and Metronomy.

Following the closure of the Queen's Head, Shame relocated their Chimney Shitters night to the Windmill. They chose the venue because it "was one of the few venues that would let us do that" and that without organising their own nights "being put on these bills by random London promoters, where there was no thought given to it. We would end up supporting a folk acoustic duo, and we just thought this is ridiculous". In response, much of the Queen's Head scene began to gravitate to the Windmill and which saw more frequent attendees and quickly built a larger and more tight-knit community. By 2018, the Windmill had become what Rosy Bones of Goat Girl named "the Mecca" of the London scene. Matt Maltese also noted the Shacklewell Arms in Dalston as another of the community's "home from home". During this time, the Old Blue Last in Shoreditch was frequented by the scene, but it began to boycotted by bands following a 2018 incident when Hotel Lux vocalist Lewis Duffin was choked by a security guard while supporting Shame. Around 2016, many of the artists began to be represented by Golden Arm Management, and his record label Wintermute Tapes, including Dead Pretties, Sorry and Lice.

=== Early attention and second-wave (2017–2019) ===
HMLTD were one of their first bands from the Windmill scene to gain mainstream attention

Around 2017, HMLTD began to gain significant attention from the mainstream, signing to Sony Records. That year, they were featured in the Guardian's "One to watch", noting them as "the latest outfit to be hailed as rock's saviours". However, on 15 May, Vice published an article accusing the band of queerbaiting due to the glam rock-inspired image. In response, Sony did not allow them to release new music for ten months and encouraged them to adopt a different aesthetic, with "parkas and wear mod cuts". Because of this, they lost much of the attention surrounding them and were soon dropped by Sony. January 2018 saw the release of Shame's debut album Songs of Praise, which saw critical acclaim and brought attention to the scene. They were named one of the picks for BBC's "Sound of 2018"

2018 also saw the emergence of a second-wave of Windmill bands, including Black Midi, Crewel Intentions, Drug Store Romeos and Sistertalk. Performances of these acts were often organised by a different set of promoters, such as TUSK and Femme Collective. Shame credited the growth of the scene as a political reaction against the British mainstream of the time, particularly the 2017 United Kingdom general election which saw an increased turnout to support Jeremy Corbyn who ultimately did not become Prime Minister of the United Kingdom. On a separate occasion, they said the Windmill in particular fostered a larger scene because the promoters make an effort to have bands frequently return to the venue. In a 2022 interview, Anouska Sokolow of Windmill band Honeyglaze explained the expansion of the scene as deriving from the area surrounding the Windmill having a large university student population. Many of the groups in this wave were signing to Speedy Wunderground, such as Black Country, New Road and Black Midi.

=== Mainstream breakthrough (2019–present) ===
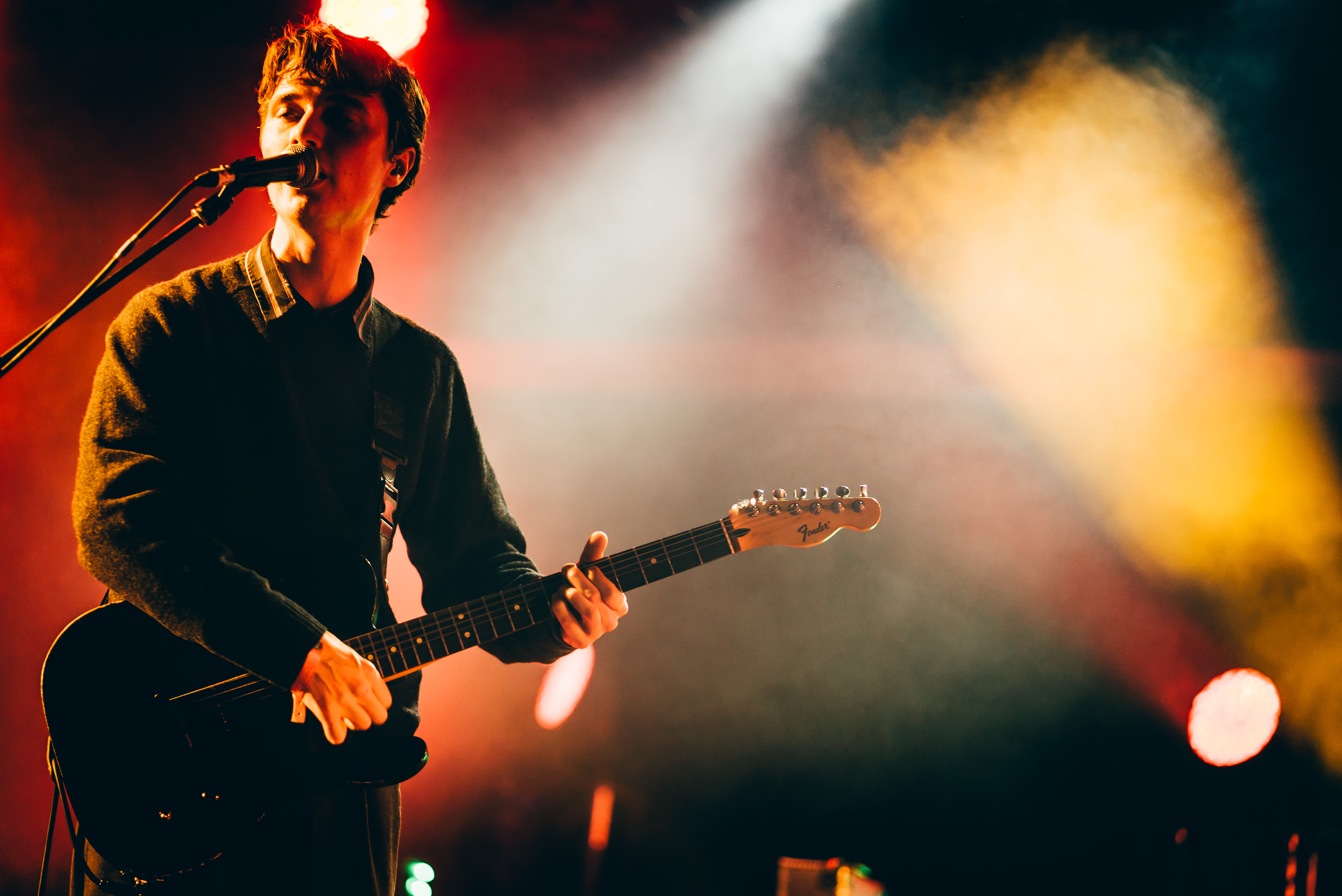
Isaac Wood of Black Country, New Road performing in 2020

Described by Dylan Wolf of Ramapo College of New Jersey's Ramapo News in 2025 as "the most significant movement in rock music in the past decade", the Windmill scene began to be acknowledged by mainstream outlets like NPR Music and The Independent in the early 2020s as an emerging force in British guitar music. In February 2019, the South London scene's "unofficial documentarian" Lou Smith uploaded a video of Black Country, New Road live at the Windmill to YouTube. The video garnered thousands of views and helped establish an online community of fans. His YouTube channel has been cited as capturing the earliest performances of groups such as Fat White Family, Black Midi, Shame, Warmduscher, and Black Country, New Road, helping them attract wider industry interest. Bassist Georgia Davies of the Last Dinner Party cited Smith's recording of their fourth ever gig as quickly garnering them interest from labels, managers, agents and lawyers. They were signed a few months after the performance.

Frontrunners of the movement have achieved commercial success, with Black Country, New Road's Ants from Up There album debuting at No. 3 on the UK Albums Chart, and a well received performance by Black Midi of the song "bmbmbm" on the Hyundai Mercury Prize in 2019. The scene is widely described as sharing a spoken vocal style as well as a blend of experimental rock and post-punk. Nonetheless, some of the scene's biggest exponents, such as Black Midi and its guitarist Geordie Greep, began to incorporate different influences to their work, such as progressive rock and world music, as well as indie rock and chamber pop in the case of Black Country, New Road. The Windmill scene has also begun to have an influence in foreign acts, with the United States' Geese and Sprain, and Chile's Candelabro and Hesse Kassel being compared to Windmill bands.

== Reactions ==
In 2020, the scene's central promoter, Tim Perry critised the category, stating "the whole 'Windmill scene' thing... There isn't a fucking scene! There are certain linked people but that’s it. The bands are so different anyway!" In 2024, Geordie Greep of Black Midi stated of the categorisation "It seemed a bit forced. That's the vibe of these things. People really like being a fan of something and having that thing be interconnected. I mean, it's cool, but it's not really about music."

In a 2022 interview, Charlie Wayne of Black Country, New Road stated "it wasn't like we were all going to each other's houses and having massive blowouts. The idea of scene implies that there's something a bit more substantial than just being mates... I was speaking to Cameron from black midi about Squid's new album, and he was like, 'It's sort of weird that people think about Squid in this scene, because I don't even know whether they played at the Windmill—and if they did, I never saw them.' I've seen them personally at, like, one or two gigs." However, his bandmate Georgia Ellery countered "It definitely made for a really exciting environment—playing at the Windmill, on a lineup with black midi or, other bands that you had no idea what they were going to sound like. It felt very exciting to me, and a good community because [Tim Perry] puts anything on. He's kind of a selector at this point... I did feel like I was part of a community, which is a nice feeling."

Georgia Davies of Windmill band the Last Dinner Party stated in 2023 that "I feel like The Windmill scene is going to be looked back on as this musical ethos, and its own genre and scene. It felt like being part of something", with her bandmate Abigail Morris mirroring "When we first moved to London, we would go every week. Something felt exciting and alive about it, especially with bands like Black Midi and HMLTD. They were also doing it in this way that started with playing live first, and there’s this whole mystery around it" Honeyglaze bassist Tim Curtis said "The Windmill scene is actually only maybe 40% post-punk, the rest of it is all kinds of music and it’s just people who hang out at this pub. We’re comfortable being associated with the scene because it’s the actual community we’re part of. The style isn’t a focus, it’s just an association"

== See also ==
- Sprechgesang
- Postmodern music
- Brexit
- Crank wave
- 2010s post-punk revival
- Chunk
