= Post-punk revival =

Genre of indie rock music

- Other names: Indie rock revival; Garage rock revival
- Stylistic origins: Indie rock; post-punk; new wave; alternative rock; garage rock; garage punk; Britpop
- Cultural origins: Late 1990s and early 2000s, United States, Europe, and Australia
- Derivative forms: Landfill indie; indie surf

Subgenres
- Dance-punk revival; new rave

Other topics
- New wave of new wave; crank wave; sass

Post-punk revival (also known as indie rock revival or garage rock revival) is a musical scene and movement that emerged in the early 2000s. Originating as a stripped-down and back-to-basics version of guitar rock inspired by the original sounds and aesthetics of post-punk, new wave and garage rock, the movement became closely associated with the new wave revival and garage rock revival.

The genre has an emphasis on "rock authenticity" that was seen as a reaction to the commercialism of MTV-oriented nu metal, hip hop and "bland" post-Britpop groups. The commercial breakthrough of the genre came with the release of the Strokes' Is This It and the White Stripes' White Blood Cells, both in 2001. The genre reached a zenith in the middle of the decade with the success of Bloc Party, Arctic Monkeys, the Killers, and Yeah Yeah Yeahs. Over time, later indie and post-punk bands were criticized with the term "landfill indie".

== Definitions and characteristics ==
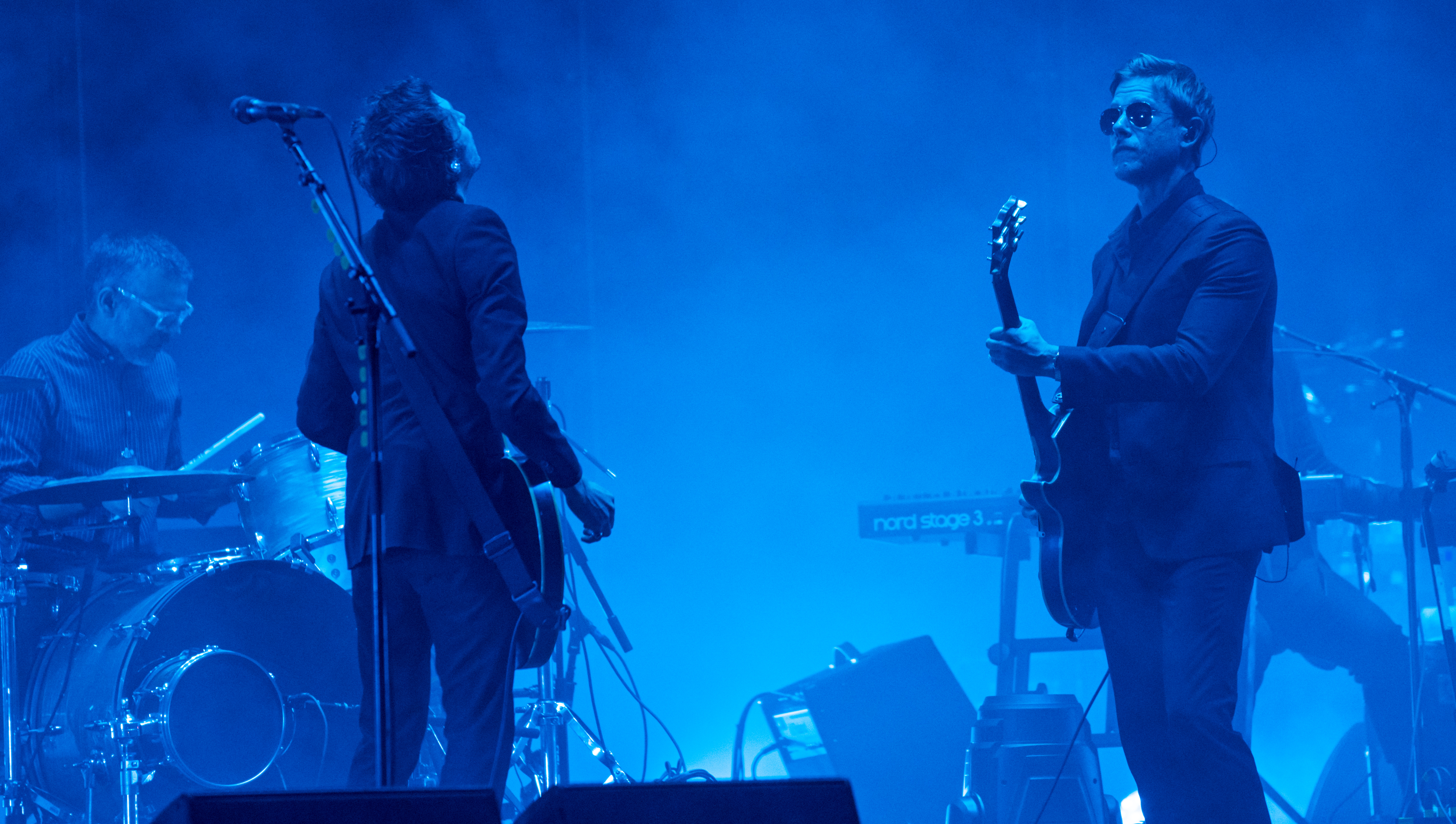
Interpol, one of the founding post-punk revival bands, pictured here in 2019

The term post-punk was coined to describe groups who took punk and experimented with more challenging musical structures and lyrical themes, and a self-consciously art-based image, while retaining punk's initial iconoclastic stance.

In the early 2000s, a new group of bands that played a stripped down and back-to-basics version of guitar rock emerged into the mainstream. They were variously characterized as part of a garage rock, new wave or post-punk revival. Inspired by the original sounds and aesthetics of garage rock of the 1960s and new wave and post-punk of the late 1970s and early 1980s, with other influences that ranged from traditional blues, through new wave to grunge. They shared an emphasis on energetic live performance and used aesthetics (in hair and clothes) closely aligned with their fans, often drawing on fashion of the 1950s and 1960s, with "skinny ties, white belts [and] shag haircuts". There was an emphasis on "rock authenticity" that was seen as a reaction to the commercialism of MTV-oriented nu metal, hip hop and "bland" post-Britpop groups.

Because the bands came from countries around the world, cited diverse influences and adopted differing styles of dress, their unity as a genre has been disputed. For garage rock historian Eric James Abbey, these were diverse bands that appropriated (or were given) the label "garage" to gain a degree of credibility. AllMusic argued that rather than a revival, the history of post-punk was more of a continuum from the mid-1980s, with scattered bands that included Big Flame, World Domination Enterprises, and Minimal Compact extending the genre. In the mid-1990s, notable bands in this vein included Six Finger Satellite, Brainiac and Elastica. At the turn of the century, the term "post-punk" began to appear in the music press again, with a number of critics reviving the label to describe a new set of bands that shared some of the aesthetics of the original post-punk era. Music critic Simon Reynolds noted that bands like the Rapture and Franz Ferdinand were influenced by the more angular strain of post-punk, particularly bands such as Wire and Gang of Four. Additionally, cultural theorist Mark Fisher opined that Franz Ferdinand were taking influences from the '80s Scottish post-punk scene by comparing their sound to bands like Josef K. Subsequently, Franz Ferdinand would go on to cover the song "Get Up and Use Me" by Scottish post-punk band the Fire Engines. Others identified this movement as another wave of garage rock revivalism, with NME in 2003 designating it a "new garage rock revolution", or simply a "new rock revolution". According to music critic Jim DeRogatis, the Strokes, the White Stripes and the Hives all had a sound "to some extent rooted in Nuggets-era garage rock".

== History ==
=== Background ===
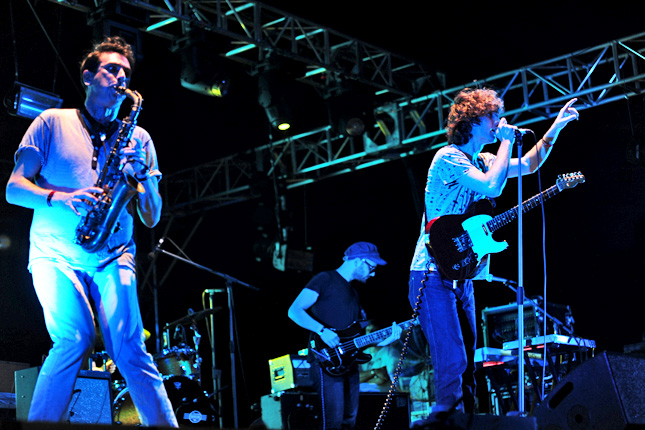
The Rapture performing in 2011

There was interest in garage rock and elements of punk in the 1980s and 1990s, and by 2000 local music scenes in several countries had bands playing alternative and indie music. The Detroit rock scene included the White Stripes and the Von Bondies. New York's scene included the Strokes, Interpol, Yeah Yeah Yeahs, Le Tigre, TV on the Radio, LCD Soundsystem, the Walkmen, the Rapture, and Liars. In Los Angeles and San Francisco, the scene was centered around Black Rebel Motorcycle Club, Brian Jonestown Massacre, the Dandy Warhols and Silversun Pickups. Other countries had their own local bands incorporating post-punk music.

=== 2001–2007: Commercial breakthrough ===
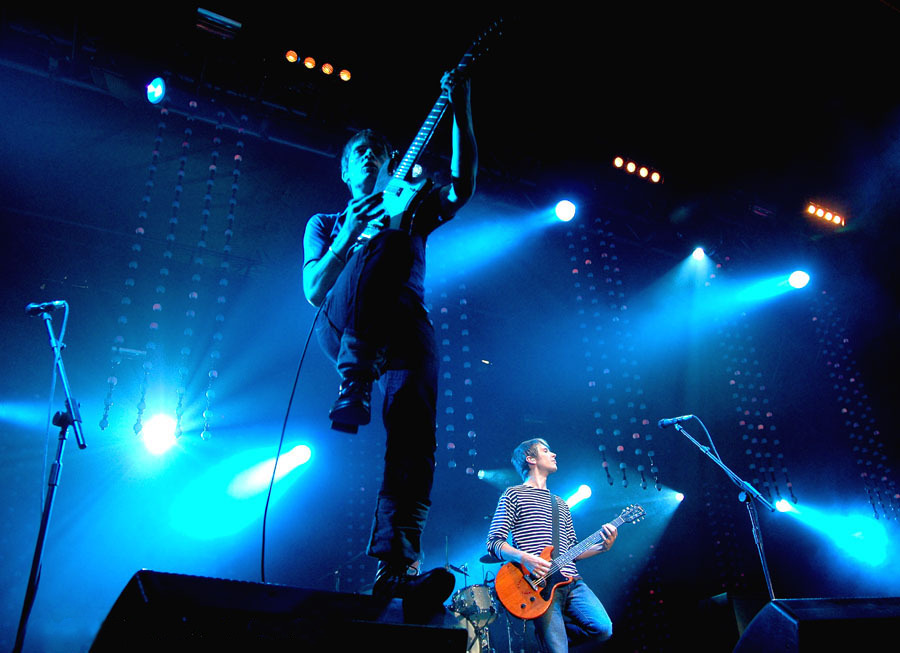
Franz Ferdinand on stage in 2006

The commercial breakthrough from these scenes began initially in the UK, and was led by a small group of bands. The Strokes emerged from the New York club scene with their debut album, Is This It (2001), which debuted at No. 2 in the UK and cracked the Top 40 in America. The White Stripes, from Detroit, released their third album, White Blood Cells (2001), which charted decently in both the US and the UK, as well as spawning two transatlantic Top 25 singles. The Hives, from Sweden, became a mainstream success with their compilation album Your New Favourite Band (2001) which peaked at No. 7 on the UK charts. Also in 2001, Black Rebel Motorcycle Club's debut album, B.R.M.C., hit No. 5 in the UK. The Vines, from Australia, released Highly Evolved in 2002, which was a top 5 success in both England and Australia, and peaked at No. 11 in the US. With the Strokes, White Stripes, Hives and others, they were christened by parts of the media as part of a cohort of "The" bands, and dubbed "the saviours of rock 'n' roll", prompting Rolling Stone magazine to declare on its September 2002 cover, "Rock is Back!" This press attention, in turn, led to accusations of hype, and some dismissed the scene as unoriginal, image-conscious and tuneless. According to Reynolds, "apart from maybe the White Stripes, none could really be described as retro".

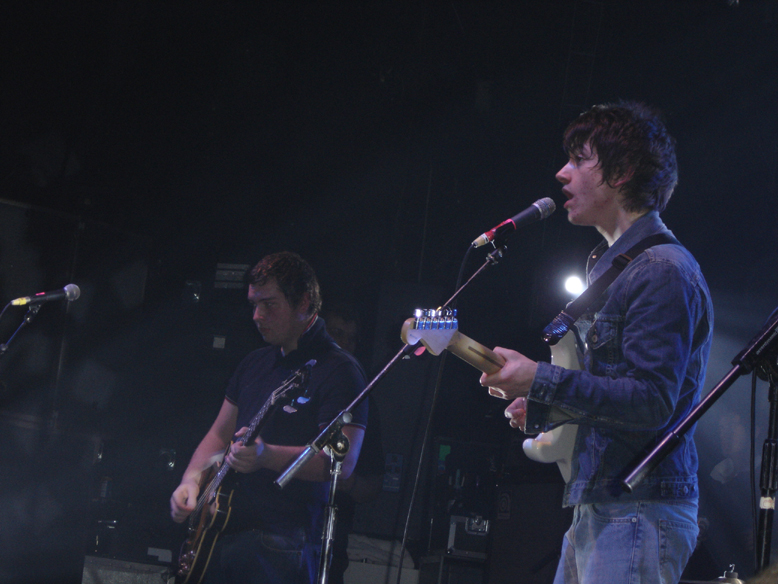
Arctic Monkeys on stage in 2006

In the wake of this attention, existing acts like Yeah Yeah Yeahs were able to sign to major record labels. A second wave of bands that managed to gain international recognition as a result of the movement included Interpol, the Black Keys, the Killers, Kings of Leon, Modest Mouse, the Shins, the Bravery, Spoon, the Hold Steady, and the National in the US, and Franz Ferdinand, Bloc Party, the Futureheads, the Cribs, the Libertines, Kaiser Chiefs and the Kooks in the UK. Arctic Monkeys were the most prominent act to owe their initial commercial success to the use of Internet social networking, with two No. 1 singles and Whatever People Say I Am, That's What I'm Not (2006), which became the fastest-selling debut album in British chart history.

=== 2008–2010: "Landfill indie" and decline in popularity ===
In Britain, in the years following Whatever People Say I Am, That's What I'm Not there was a proliferation of bands, such as the Pigeon Detectives, Milburn, the Fratellis and the Rifles, who created a more formulaic derivative of the earlier acts. By the end of the decade, critics had taken to referring to this wave of acts as "landfill indie", a description coined by Andrew Harrison of The Word magazine. In a 2009 article for The Guardian, journalist Peter Robinson cited the landfill indie movement as dead, blaming Scouting for Girls, the Wombats and Joe Lean by stating "If landfill indie had been a game of Buckaroo, those three sent the whole donkey's arse of radio-friendly mainstream guitar band monotony flying high into the air, legs flailing." A 2020 Vice article cited Johnny Borrell, vocalist of Razorlight, as the "one man who defined, embodied and lived Landfill Indie" due to his forming of a "spectacularly middle-of-the-road" band despite his close proximity to the Libertines' "desperate kinetic energy, mythologised love-hate dynamic and vision of a dilapidated Britain animated by romance and narcotics".

By 2008, the initial success of the movement was beginning to subside, leading commentators to discuss its decline as a phenomenon and argue that it had been overtaken by the more musically and emotionally complex music of indie rock bands like Arcade Fire and Death Cab for Cutie. By the end of the decade, many of the bands of the movement had broken up, were on hiatus, or had moved into other musical areas, and very few were making significant impact on the charts.

Bands that returned to recording and touring in the 2010s included Franz Ferdinand, Arctic Monkeys, the Strokes and Interpol.

=== 2011–present: Crank wave, Post-Brexit New Wave and Windmill scene ===
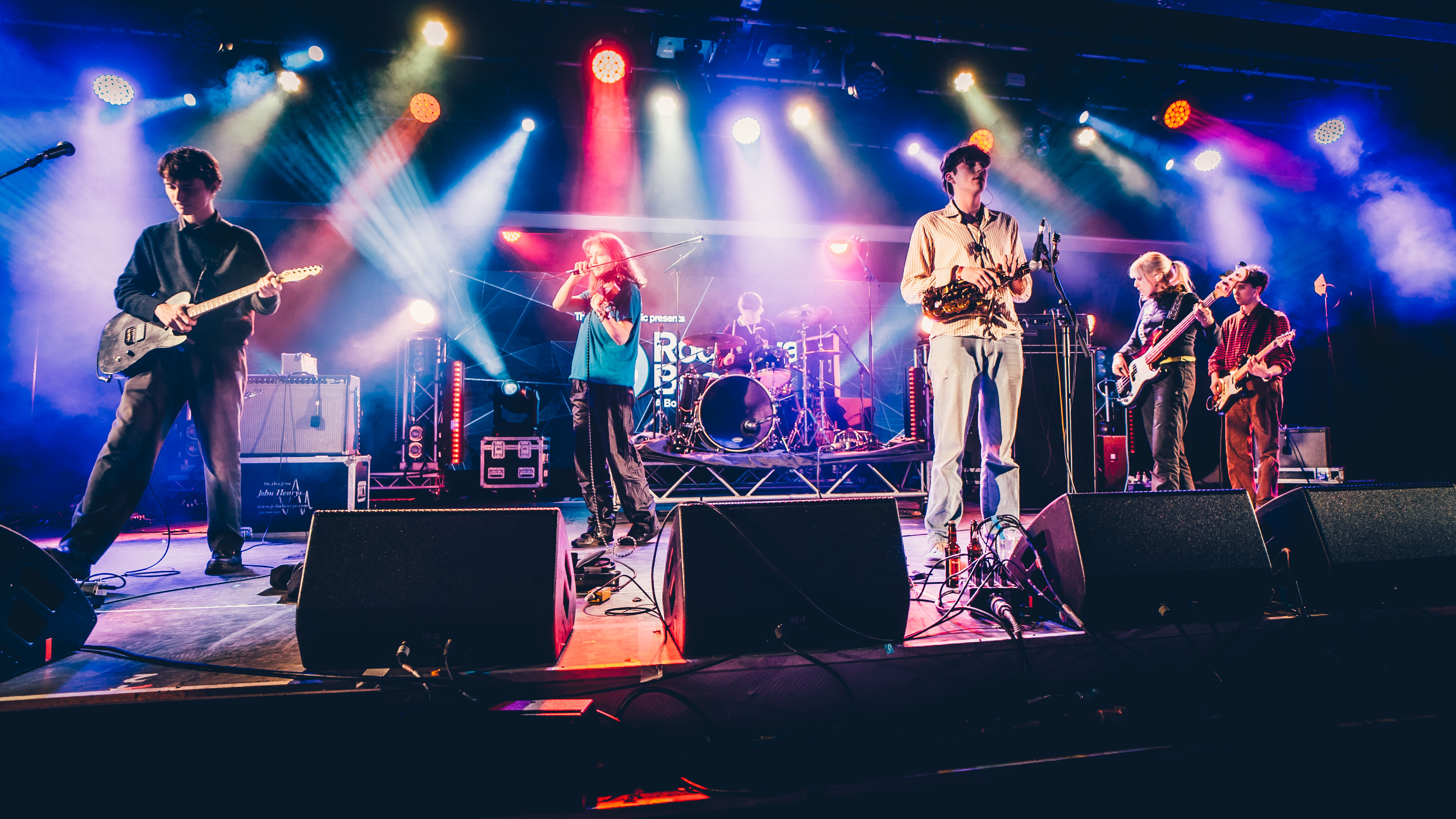
Black Country, New Road performing in 2020

Post punk artists that attained prominence in the 2010s and early 2020s included Parquet Courts, Protomartyr, Priests and Geese (United States), Preoccupations (Canada), Iceage (Denmark), and Viagra Boys (Sweden).

In the mid-to-late 2010s and early 2020s, a new wave of post-punk bands from Britain and Ireland emerged. The groups in this scene have been described with the term "crank wave" by NME in 2019, and as "Post-Brexit New Wave" by NPR writer Matthew Perpetua in 2021. Perpetua describes the groups in the scene as "U.K. bands that kinda talk-sing over post-punk music, and sometimes it's more like post-rock." Many of the acts are associated with producer Dan Carey and his record label Speedy Wunderground, and with The Windmill, a music venue in Brixton, London. Artists that have been identified as part of the style include Black Midi, Squid, Black Country, New Road, Dry Cleaning, Shame, Sleaford Mods, Fontaines D.C., the Murder Capital, Idles and Yard Act.

Critical pushback on the lack of innovation, and homogeneity, of some of the bands under this umbrella has led to some referring to the bands they deem less interesting as "landfill post-punk". The term was coined by Sam Dynes, writing for The Mancunion, who stated that "a clear fondness for Mark E Smith runs through most of the lesser bands to the point of parody".

Other notable British post-punk revival bands of this era include Trash Kit and Shopping (both of which included Ray Aggs as a member), and Big Joanie. These groups emerged from the scenes surrounding the London music venues Power Lunches and DIY Space for London.

== See also ==
- List of post-punk revival bands
- New rave
- New wave of new wave
