= Anywhere but Here =

Anywhere but Here may refer to:

== Books and comics ==
- "Anywhere but Here" (Buffy comic), a 2008 Buffy the Vampire Slayer comic
- Anywhere but Here (novel), a 1986 novel by Mona Simpson
- Anywhere but Here, a 1988–2003 manga series by Miki Tori

== Film and television ==
- Anywhere but Here (film), a 1999 adaptation of Mona Simpson's novel
- "Anywhere but Here" (Third Watch), a 1999 TV episode

== Music ==
=== Albums ===
- Anywhere but Here (The Ataris album), 1997
- Anywhere but Here (Chris Cagle album) or the title song, 2005
- Anywhere but Here (Mayday Parade album) or the title song, 2009
- Anywhere but Here (Sorry album), 2022
- Anywhere but Here, by Kayak, 2011
- Anywhere but Here, an EP by Gingger Shankar, 2010

=== Songs ===
- "Anywhere but Here" (Sammy Kershaw song), by Sammy Kershaw, 1992
- "Anywhere but Here", by Brice Long, 2005; also recorded by Chris Cagle, 2006
- "Anywhere but Here", by Bruce Robison and Kelly Willis from Our Year, 2014
- "Anywhere but Here", by Five Finger Death Punch from The Wrong Side of Heaven and the Righteous Side of Hell, Volume 1, 2013
- "Anywhere but Here", by Hilary Duff from the A Cinderella Story film soundtrack, 2003
- "Anywhere but Here", by Pvris from Evergreen, 2023
- "Anywhere but Here", by Rise Against from Siren Song of the Counter Culture, 2004
- "Anywhere but Here", by SafetySuit from Life Left to Go, 2008
- "Anywhere but Here", by White Town from Monopole, 2011
- "Anywhere but Here", by Yellowcard from Where We Stand, 1999
- "Anywhere but Here", from the musical Finding Neverland, 2012
