= Drive to Goldenhammer =

Studio album by Divorce
- Released: 7 March 2025
- Recorded: 2024
- Studio: The Calm Farm (North Yorkshire)
- Genre: Alternative country (Note: Attributed to multiple references:); chamber pop (Note: Attributed to multiple references:); indie rock (Note: Attributed to multiple references:); folk (Note: Attributed to multiple references:)
- Length: 43:44
- Label: Gravity; Capitol
- Producer: Catherine Marks

Divorce chronology
Heady Metal (2023)	Drive to Goldenhammer (2025)

Singles from Drive to Goldenhammer
- 1. "All My Freaks" Released: 23 September 2024; 2. "Wendolene" Released: 27 August 2025

Drive to Goldenhammer is the debut studio album by the British alternative country band Divorce. It was released digitally on 7 March 2025, via Gravity and Capitol. The deluxe version of the album was released on 27 August 2025.

== Background ==
Preceded by the band's 2023 Heady Metal EP, Drive to Goldenhammer incorporates elements of chamber pop, indie rock, electronic, folk, and country, and centers on the themes of introspection, personal growth, and vulnerability. It was written and recorded in a studio in Wiltshire and on a farm in North Yorkshire, and produced by Australian producer and engineer Catherine Marks.

"All My Freaks" was released as the first single of the album on 23 September 2024. Alongside a deluxe version of the album, "Wendolene" was released as the second single on 27 August 2025. The deluxe version encompasses material including demo tracks, sessions for BBC Radio and new songs including "Wendolene", "O Calamity", and "Chip".

== Reception ==
Professional ratings
Aggregate scores
Source	Rating
Metacritic	85/100
Review scores
Source	Rating
Clash	9/10
DIY	4.5/5 stars
Dork	4/5
God Is in the TV	9/10
The Line of Best Fit	7/10
Mojo	4/5 stars
MusicOMH	4/5 stars
The Skinny	5/5 stars
Sputnikmusic	4.0/5
Uncut	8/10

Andrew Williams of The Skinny rated the album five stars and called it "a strong early contender for album of the year" and "a debut album that looks set to push them to the front of the next-big-thing queue."

The album received a 9/10 rating from Clash, whose reviewer Jamie Wilde remarked, "It's rare to find a debut album that exudes as much honesty as what Drive to Goldenhammer does." Gemma Cockrell of God Is in the TV also gave it a 9/10 rating, referring to it as "a deeply organic, lived-in record that echoes the warmth of the pastoral landscapes the band immersed themselves in."

In a four-star review for MusicOMH, John Murphy described Drive to Goldenhammer as "hard to classify", "confident", "ambitious", and "one of those albums that you hear more in each time you listen to it." Sputnikmusic's Dakota West Foss gave it a 4.0 rating and noted it as "a smashing success because it never lets these inspirations get in the way of actually feeling inspired," citing influences of Arctic Monkeys and The Naked and Famous on the album. Jordan Ellison of Dork, in his review with a rating of 4/5, described the album as "both carefully constructed and marvelously spontaneous," and commented on the production, stating it contains "a perfect balance of polish and grit."

Rating the album seven out of ten, The Line of Best Fit's Matt Young stated that the album adds "strong roots and demonstrates that their combination of talent, originality, and introspection has the potential to journey anywhere they wish," noting its "rich tapestry of sounds and themes." The Guardian writer Lisa Wright commented on the album displaying "a depth to the songwriting that feels hard-earned, exciting and entirely their own," describing its songs as "big-hearted and full of personal exploration."

Hester Aalberts of Dutch magazine Oor opined that the album is "strongly narrative" and stylistically incorporates multiple genres, noting its similarity to The Last Dinner Party's debut album, Prelude to Ecstasy. The album was assigned a rating of 4.5 stars by Daisy Carter of DIY, who called the project "a dynamic, difficult-to-predict listen that gently but deftly rebuts anyone who thinks they already know what Divorce are all about."

== Track listing ==
Drive to Goldenhammer track listing
No.	Title	Writer(s)	Length
1.	"Antarctica"	Felix Mackenzie-Barrow	3:14
2.	"Lord"	Mackenzie-Barrow; Tiger Cohen-Towell	3:30
3.	"Fever Pitch"	Cohen-Towell	3:28
4.	"Karen"	Cohen-Towell	3:57
5.	"Jet Show"	Mackenzie-Barrow; Cohen-Towell	3:20
6.	"Parachuter"	Mackenzie-Barrow	3:15
7.	"All My Freaks"	Cohen-Towell	3:01
8.	"Hangman"	Mackenzie-Barrow	3:09
9.	"Pill"	Cohen-Towell	5:09
10.	"Old Broken String"	Mackenzie-Barrow	4:46
11.	"Where Do You Go"	Cohen-Towell	3:15
12.	"Mercy"	Mackenzie-Barrow	3:40
Total length:			43:44

Drive to Goldenhammer (Deluxe Edition) track listing
No.	Title	Writer(s)	Length
13.	"Wendolene"	Mackenzie-Barrow; Cohen-Towell; Adam Peter-Smith; Kasper Sandstrom	4:02
14.	"O Calamity"	Mackenzie-Barrow; Cohen-Towell; Peter-Smith; Sandstrom	2:24
15.	"Chip"	Mackenzie-Barrow; Cohen-Towell; Peter-Smith; Sandstrom	3:13
16.	"Tiny Animals (Demo)"	Mackenzie-Barrow; Cohen-Towell; Peter-Smith; Sandstrom	4:02
17.	"Pretty Lights (Demo)"	Mackenzie-Barrow; Cohen-Towell; Peter-Smith; Sandstrom	2:37
18.	"Karen (Abbey Road Session)"	Cohen-Towell	4:26
19.	"Pill (Live at the BBC)"	Cohen-Towell	5:16
20.	"I Want to Break Free (Live at the BBC)"	John Richard Deacon	3:24
Total length:			73:08

== Personnel ==
Credits adapted from the album's liner notes and Tidal.

=== Divorce ===
- Adam Peter-Smith – Organelle (tracks 1–8, 11), electric guitar (1–7, 9, 11, 18), backing vocals (5–7, 11, 12, 17), synthesizer (7, 13, 16, 20), Archtop semi-acoustic guitar (10), baritone guitar (11), acoustic guitar (12), guitar (13–17, 19), organ (13–16, 18–20); güiro, harmonica (14); production (16, 17), engineering (16)
- Felix Mackenzie-Barrow – electric guitar (1–9, 11, 13, 16, 18–20), vocals (1–3, 5–17, 20), piano (2, 3, 8–10, 13, 20), acoustic guitar (2, 4, 6, 8, 9, 12, 13, 17, 19), 12-string acoustic guitar (2, 4, 8, 9, 12), Rhodes (3, 5, 6, 11, 15), Organelle (3), 12-string electric guitar (4, 8), baritone guitar (8), harmonium (10), mandolin (13, 14), synthesizer (13), bass (14), guitar (15, 16), production (16, 17), engineering (16)
- Kasper Sandstrom – drums (1–13, 15–20), acoustic guitar (1), synthesizer (2, 5, 7, 9), percussion (2, 9, 11, 13, 14, 19), backing vocals (3, 5, 6, 8, 10–12, 17, 19), electric guitar (3), 12-string electric guitar (6), programming (9), Organelle (10), mandolin (14); production, mixing (16, 17); engineering (16)
- Tiger Cohen-Towell – bass, vocals (all tracks); synthesizer (2, 5, 13), electric organ (3), piano (9), Organelle (12), backing vocals (13, 17), glockenspiel (13), production (16, 17), engineering (16), xylophone (17)

=== Additional contributors ===
- Catherine Marks – production (1–12, 15), mixing (13–15), whistling (9)
- Richie Kennedy – production (13–15, 19), engineering (1–12)
- Sarah Meyz – production (18)
- Dan Roberts – production (20), mixing (19, 20)
- Drew Dungate Smith – engineering (13–15, 17, 19)
- Dani Bennett Spragg – engineering (18)
- Daniela Sicilia – engineering (18)
- Leah Morris – engineering (18)
- Marta Di Nozzi – engineering (18)
- Guy Worth – engineering (19, 20)
- Bob Mackenzie – engineering assistance (1–12), backing vocals (6)
- Mike Mogis – mixing (1–12)
- Eduardo De La Paz – mixing (18)
- John Webber – mastering (1–15)
- Pete Maher – mastering (16–19)
- Chris Haigh – fiddle (1, 10)
- Flower Up Studio – photography, vinyl design, artwork, painting
- Rosie Sco – photography
