= Sprechgesang =

Expressionist vocal techniques between singing and speaking

Sprechgesang (German: [ˈʃpʁɛçɡəzaŋ], "spoken singing") and Sprechstimme (German: [ˈʃpʁɛçʃtɪmə], "spoken voice"), more commonly known as speak-singing in English, are expressionist musical vocal techniques between singing and speaking. Though sometimes used interchangeably, Sprechgesang is directly related to the operatic recitative manner of singing (in which pitches are sung, but the articulation is rapid and loose like speech), whereas Sprechstimme is closer to speech itself (because it does not emphasise any particular pitches).

== Sprechgesang ==
Sprechgesang is more closely aligned with the long-used musical techniques of recitative or parlando than is Sprechstimme. Where the term is employed in this way, it is usually in the context of the late Romantic German operas or "music dramas" that were composed by Richard Wagner and others in the 19th century. Thus, Sprechgesang is often merely a German alternative to 'recitative'.

== Sprechstimme ==
The earliest compositional use of the technique was in the first version of Engelbert Humperdinck's 1897 melodrama Königskinder (in the 1910 version it was replaced by conventional singing), where it may have been intended to imitate a style already in use by singers of lieder and popular song, but it is more closely associated with the composers of the Second Viennese School. Arnold Schoenberg asks for the technique in a number of pieces: the part of the Speaker in Gurre-Lieder (1911) is written in his notation for Sprechstimme, but it was Pierrot lunaire (1912) where he used it throughout and left a note attempting to explain the technique. Alban Berg adopted the technique and asked for it in parts of his operas Wozzeck and Lulu.

=== History ===
In the foreword to Pierrot lunaire (1912), Schoenberg explains how his Sprechstimme should be achieved. He explains that the indicated rhythms should be adhered to, but that whereas in ordinary singing a constant pitch is maintained through a note, here the singer "immediately abandons it by falling or rising. The goal is certainly not at all a realistic, natural speech. On the contrary, the difference between ordinary speech and speech that collaborates in a musical form must be made plain. But it should not call singing to mind, either."

For the first performances of Pierrot lunaire, Schoenberg was able to work directly with the vocalist and obtain exactly the result he desired, but later performances were problematic. Schoenberg had written many subsequent letters attempting to clarify, but he was unable to leave a definitive explanation and there has been much disagreement as to what was actually intended. Pierre Boulez wrote, "the question arises whether it is actually possible to speak according to a notation devised for singing. This was the real problem at the root of all the controversies. Schoenberg's own remarks on the subject are not in fact clear."

Schoenberg later used a notation without a traditional clef in the Ode to Napoleon Bonaparte (1942), A Survivor from Warsaw (1947) and his unfinished opera Moses und Aron, which eliminated any reference to a specific pitch, but retained the relative slides and articulations.

=== Notation ===
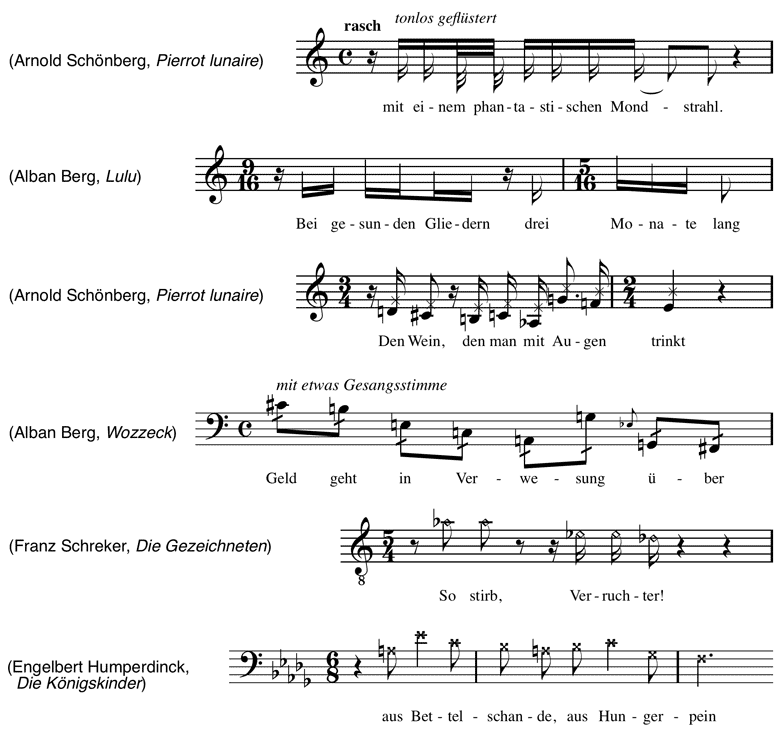
Examples of various notations

In Schoenberg's musical notation, Sprechstimme is usually indicated by small crosses through the stems of the notes, or with the notehead itself being a small cross.

Schoenberg's later notation (first used in his Ode to Napoleon Bonaparte, 1942) replaced the 5-line staff with a single line having no clef. The note stems no longer bear the 'x', as it is now clear that no specific pitch is intended, and instead relative pitches are specified by placing the notes above or below the single line (sometimes on ledger lines).

Berg notates several degrees of Sprechstimme, e. g. in Wozzeck, using single-line staff for rhythmic speaking, five-line staves with 'x' through the note stem, and a single stroke through the stem for close-to-singing Sprechstimme.

In modern usage, it is most common to indicate Sprechstimme by using an 'x' in place of a conventional notehead.

== Use in pop and rock music ==
Sprechgesang-style talk-singing has appeared in contemporary pop, rock, punk, and alternative music since the 1960s. The Sprechgesang vocal style is also prominent in the Windmill scene and crank wave, with several groups featuring a vocalist that uses the talk-sing method.

The following pop and rock artists have been described as featuring Sprechgesang or talk-sing vocals in their music:

- The B-52s
- Black Country, New Road
- Black Grape
- Black Midi
- Cake
- Nick Cave
- Cheekface
- Do Nothing
- Dry Cleaning
- Bob Dylan
- Billie Eilish
- Chat Pile
- The Fall
- The Flying Lizards
- Fontaines D.C.
- French Vanilla
- Happy Mondays
- Hesse Kassel
- The Hold Steady
- Kraftwerk
- Life Without Buildings
- Lou Reed
- Jonathan Richman
- Olivia Rodrigo
- Self Esteem
- Shame
- Sleaford Mods
- Slint
- Sonic Youth
- Sprain
- Squid
- They Might Be Giants
- Wet Leg
- Yard Act

== See also ==
- Rapping
- Spoken word
- Talking blues
