= Landfill indie =

Trend in British indie rock

- Other names: Indie landfill; The Deleted Years
- Stylistic origins: Indie rock; pop rock; Britpop; garage rock revival; post-punk revival
- Cultural origins: 2000s, United Kingdom

Other topics
- New Yorkshire; indie sleaze; lad culture; blog rock; C86; plastic soul; crank wave

Landfill indie (also known as indie landfill or The Deleted Years) is a loosely defined trend in British indie rock and pop rock. The term was first coined as a pejorative label by music journalist Andrew Harrison in 2007, where he used it to disparagingly describe the proliferation of formulaic and uninspired British guitar bands dominating the mid-2000s music scene.

Music regarded as being part of the indie landfill was prominent in the UK singles charts in the 2000s and early 2010s, seeing commercial success and drawing ire from music critics. It has been retrospectively associated with the indie sleaze aesthetic, a term coined in 2021, to describe the fashion and visual style of landfill indie bands and other contemporaneous developments in alternative music.

== Characteristics ==
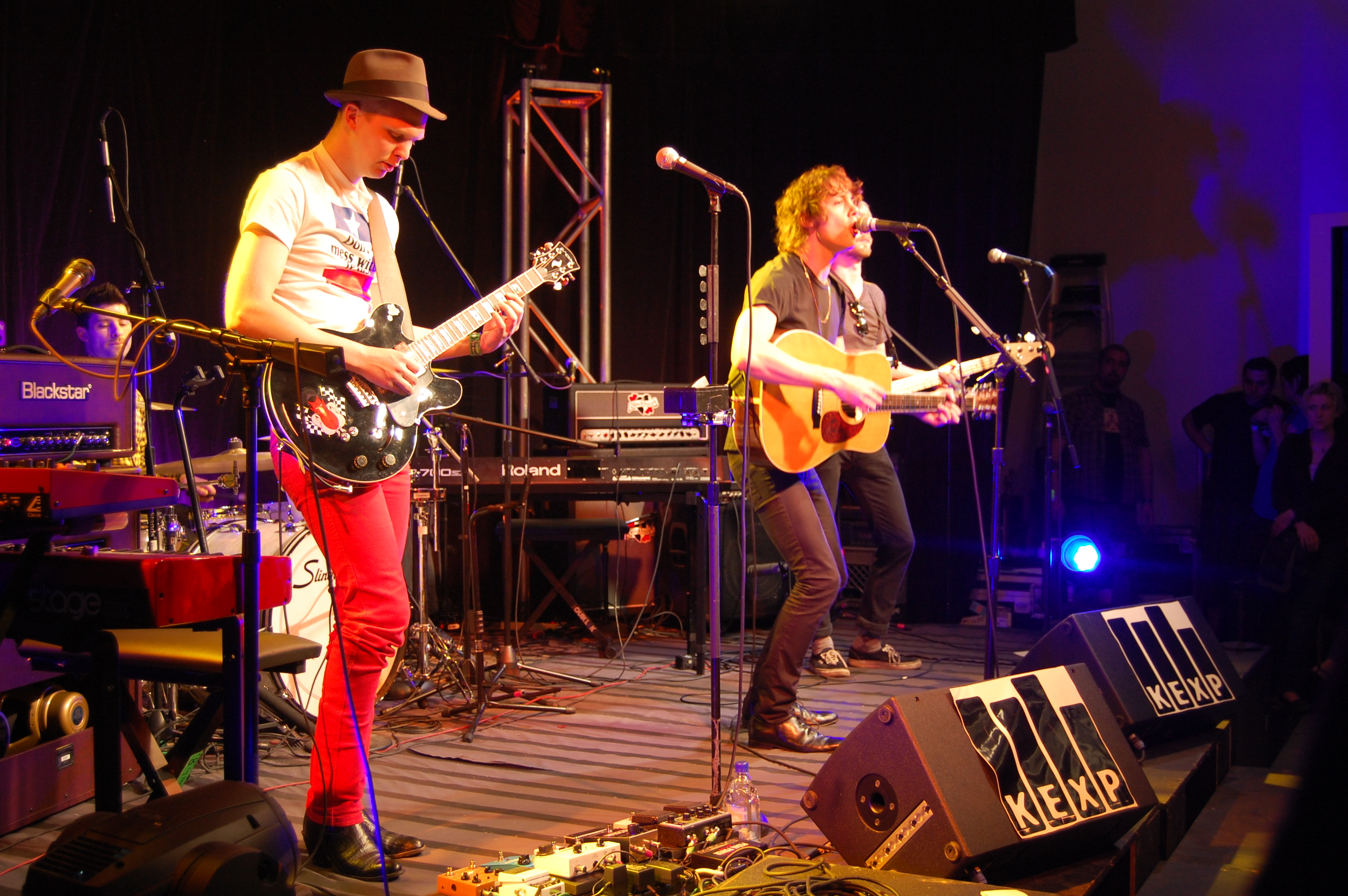
British indie rock band Razorlight in 2009

The Guardian defined the traits of landfill indie bands as having "angular, jangly guitars plus big riffs plus amusingly pretentious lyricism". The phrase was used disparagingly to describe the proliferation of formulaic and uninspired British guitar bands dominating the mid-2000s music scene. Music critic Simon Reynolds argued that the "landfill indie" era was characterized by an excess in indie rock bands in response to the popularity of the 2000s indie rock revival. According to Reynolds, what made the music "landfill" was not a lack of musical skill, but a proliferation of formulaic artists who were stripped of the naivety, innovation and authenticity that defined earlier indie acts such as Bogshed and Beat Happening, stating:

[I]ndie wasn't crappy for a purpose. In fact, it wasn't especially inept or ramshackle anymore, so much as drearily adequate. Instrumentally, there was just a sustained absence of flair in the playing. This guitar-based music didn't rock, but equally the songcraft wasn't sufficiently strong, or forcefully sung enough, for it to make the grade as proper pop music.

Reynolds later professed his belief that "[n]one of [the] groups could honestly be described as pointing the way to any kind of future; there was little about them that would have been incomprehensible to, say, a Smiths fan in 1985". Greg Cochrane for the BBC described the year 2009 as "the year indie music died", referring to the indie landfill. However, publications like the NME championed many landfill bands at the time by frequently placing them on the front page. Metro Magazine later claimed that the 2000s landfill indie era was a time when "the NME ruled a new saviour of rock music seemingly every week."

Vice magazine described Razorlight's Johnny Borrell as the "one man who defined, embodied and lived Landfill Indie" due to his forming of a "spectacularly middle-of-the-road" band, despite his close proximity to the Libertines. In an July 2026 article about the band's 20th anniversary and tour, Borrell stated that "I think the second Razorlight album definitely opened the way for a flood of mediocrity in UK music".

== History and etymology ==
The term was first coined as a pejorative label by music journalist Andrew Harrison in his 2007 review of Jens Lekman's Night Falls Over Kortedala, where he deployed it to disparagingly describe the proliferation of what was represented in the term as the formulaic and uninspired style of British rock bands in the mid-2000s, akin to the excess of a landfill; the album's style was contrasted with this trend.

Maybe it was general weariness at English bands' method depravity and tunelessness that made Peter Bjorn And John's whistle-driven Young Folks into one of the tunes of last year. That single opened a window to let in the light, air and general bracingness of Swedish pop, which resembles an alfresco health farm next to our own blighted landscape of landfill indie.

The phrase was later applied to a wave of 'generic' British indie bands that emerged following the success of the Libertines, who themselves came from the post-Britpop landscape of the 1990s British alternative rock scene. In America, their variant of the landfill indie era was nicknamed "The Deleted Years" or encompassed by the "blog rock" movement.

In the early 2000s, the NME coined "the New Rock Revolution" to describe a wave of emerging rock bands, spurred by the success of American acts such as the White Stripes and the Strokes, with the former spearheading the 2000s garage rock revival movement whilst the latter led the New York post-punk revival. Bands like the Strokes went on to inspire influential British groups across the Atlantic, such as the Libertines, whom NME described as "the bed-haired Brit version of [the Strokes] almost as soon as they appeared."

In August 2020, Vice magazine published a retrospective on the era which stated "Somewhere between the 'indie rock revival' of the early-2000s and the emergence of 'poptimism' in the early-2010s, the UK charts were dominated by a procession of homogenous bands making a type of music that has come to be referred to as: 'Landfill indie'". In addition, the term landfill indie would continue to be used as a pejorative as well as a label to describe this period of British alternative music.

== Decline and legacy ==
In a 2009 article for the Guardian, journalist Peter Robinson cited the landfill indie movement as dead, blaming the Wombats, Scouting For Girls, and Joe Lean & the Jing Jang Jong by stating "If landfill indie had been a game of Buckaroo, those three sent the whole donkey's arse of radio-friendly mainstream guitar band monotony flying high into the air, legs flailing." The initial success of the movement was beginning to subside, leading commentators to discuss its decline as a phenomenon and argue that it had been overtaken by the more musically and emotionally complex music of indie rock bands like Animal Collective, Wild Beasts, Micachu and the Shapes, Gang Gang Dance, TV on the Radio, High Places, Foals, Vampire Weekend, Telepathe, Dirty Projectors, Bloc Party, Arcade Fire and Death Cab for Cutie.

Although the style declined in prominence by the early 2010s, the landfill indie era went on to experience a gradual revival. This resurgence was first marked by the emergence of the hashtag #indieamnesty, created by musician Rowan Martin in April 2016, and later by the launch of the Instagram account @indiesleaze in 2021, curated by Olivia V, which documented and celebrated the visual aesthetic of the era, which was later labelled indie sleaze. Some sources credit the COVID-19 lockdowns as contributing to a collective nostalgia for the landfill indie era.

In 2026, Pitchfork described acts such as Darwin Deez, Grouplove and Cults as "post-landfill-indie bands".

== See also ==
- The Inbetweeners#Music
