= Anywhere but Here (Sorry album) =

Studio album by Sorry
- Released: 7 October 2022
- Studios: Bristol, England, UK
- Genre: Indie rock
- Length: 44:18
- Language: English
- Label: Domino Recording Company
- Producers: Charlie Andrew; Ali Chant; James Dring; Patrick James Fitzroy; Asha Lorenz; Louis O'Bryen; Adrian Utley

Sorry chronology
A Night at the Windmill (2021)	Anywhere but Here (2022)

Anywhere but Here is the second full-length studio album from British indie rock band Sorry. The album has received positive reviews from critics.

== Reception ==
Editors at AnyDecentMusic? scored this album a 7.9, aggregating 15 reviews. According to the review aggregator Metacritic, Anywhere but Here received "universal acclaim" based on a weighted average score of 82 out of 100 from 11 critic scores.

At Clash Music, James Mellen gave this album 9 out of 10, calling it "the ideal sophomore record" for building on the band's previous work and states that it "could be the soundtrack to a 90s indie movie, but the tracks stay in their own world; there is no drowning in influence here". This album was shortlisted as one of the best of the week by The Daily Telegraph, with critic Caitlin Wolper giving it 4 out of 5 stars, stating that "each track contains surprises" and music that "charts the perils of miscommunication amid love, desire, and loss". Dork's Connor Fenton scored this album 4 out of 5 stars, stating that this album takes "a more exploratory approach, with tracks expanding and developing as they progress" compared to Sorry's debut album 925 and sums up that it is "a perfect addition to their discography and a perfect analysis of modern attitudes and anxieties". Writing for Gigwise, Miles Cooke gave this release 9 out of 10 stars, noting a combination of "genuine, visceral emotion" in the lyrics along with "metamorphic chaos" that has "a bit more cohesion and maturity" in the music.

The Guardian ran a review of albums that they missed in 2022 and Tshepo Mokoena called this release "reflective, honest, [and] funny". Ims Taylor of The Line of Best Fit gave this album 9 out of 10, writing that the band sticks to their playbook for songwriting and that this "feels like an album that will weather excellently as Sorry go onwards". Dominic Haley of Loud and Quiet scored Anywhere but Here an 8 out of 10 and praised the band's ability to capture the emotions of a breakup, with a "truly impressive" that shows group "as an experimental and visionary indie rock band". Mojo published a review from Andy Cowan, who gave this album 4 out of 5 stars and called this music a "curious, self-aware blend of warped pop, scared indie and gentle jazz". Rhian Daly of NME gave this album 4 out of 5 stars, writing that it "maintains their reputation as a band... who frequently take sudden turns that you don't see coming".

Pitchfork published a review from critic Aimee Cliff who scored Anywhere but Here 7.5 out of 10, summing up that it "uses deeply felt storytelling and intimate vocals to usher us much closer". Chris Conaton of PopMatters rated this album 8 out of 10, characterizing this as "a batch of songs that feel like they're poking at rock and pop conventions without being a full-on piss-take against rock music". Editors at Stereogum chose this as Album of the Week, with critic James Rettig writing that "the genius of Anywhere But Here lies in how those emotions can be jumbled up, become something you're moving past and moving through all at once". Uncut's Stephen Dalton gave this release 7 out of 10, writing that "sloppy-cool sarcasm and premature cynicism about love run through Sorry's artfully ramshackle post-punk clatter". In Under the Radar, Michelle Dalarossa rated Anywhere but Here a 7.5 out of 10 for having "a surprising consistency to the off-kilter soundscapes" in the music, which is "instantly recognizable and wholly unique".

== Track listing ==
1. "Let the Lights On" (Asha Lorenz and Louis O'Bryen) – 3:03
2. "Tell Me" (Campbell Baum, Lorenz, O'Bryen, and Marco Pini) – 4:36
3. "Key to the City" (Baum, Lorenz, and O'Bryen) – 3:40
4. "Willow Tree" (Lorenz and O'Bryen) – 2:31
5. "There's So Many People That Want to Be Loved" (Baum, Lincoln Barrett, Lorenz, O'Bryen, and Pini) – 4:05
6. "I Miss the Fool" (Barrett, Lorenz, and O'Bryen) – 3:33
7. "Step" (Baum, Lorenz, and O'Bryen) – 3:42
8. "Closer" (Lorenz and O'Bryen) – 3:46
9. "Baltimore" (Baum, Lorenz, O'Bryen, and Pini) – 3:13
10. "Hem of the Fray" (Lorenz and O'Bryen) – 2:06
11. "Quit While You're Ahead" (Lorenz and O'Bryen) – 2:30
12. "Screaming in the Rain" (Lorenz and O'Bryen) – 4:15
13. "Again" (Lorenz and O'Bryen) – 3:18

== Personnel ==
Sorry

- Lincoln Barrett – drums
- Campbell Baum – instrumentation
- Asha Lorenz – guitar, vocals, production, artwork
- Louis O'Bryen – guitar, vocals, production
- Marco Pini – electronics

Additional personnel

- Charlie Andrew – mixing on "Let the Lights On" and "Key to the City", production on "Let the Lights On" and "Key to the City"
- Ali Chant – engineering; mixing on "Tell Me", "Willow Tree", "There's So Many People That Want to Be Loved", "I Miss the Fool", "Step", "Closer", "Baltimore", "Hem of the Fray", "Quit While You're Ahead", "Screaming in the Rain", and "Again"; production on "Tell Me", "Willow Tree", "There's So Many People That Want to Be Loved", "I Miss the Fool", "Step", "Closer", "Baltimore", "Hem of the Fray", "Quit While You're Ahead", "Screaming in the Rain", and "Again"
- Matthew Cooper – artwork, design
- James Dring – production on "I Miss the Fool", "Baltimore", "Quit While You're Ahead", and "Again"
- Patrick James Fitzroy – additional production on "Screaming in the Rain"
- Matthew Glasbey – engineering
- Chris Potter – mastering
- Adrian Utley – production on "Tell Me", "Willow Tree", "There's So Many People That Want to Be Loved", "I Miss the Fool", "Step", "Closer", "Baltimore", "Hem of the Fray", "Quit While You're Ahead", "Screaming in the Rain", and "Again"

== See also ==
- 2022 in British music
- Lists of 2022 albums
