= Crank wave =

Music genre

- Other names: The post-Brexit new wave; wonk; Windmill indie
- Stylistic origins: Post-punk; noise rock; no wave; indie rock; krautrock; jazz fusion
- Cultural origins: Mid–to late 2010s, Ireland and United Kingdom

Local scenes
- Windmill scene

Other topics
- Calgary sound; sprechgesang; post-punk revival; landfill indie

Crank wave (also known as the post-Brexit new wave or wonk) is a subgenre of post-punk that emerged in the mid-to late 2010s. Acts in the genre adopt a more experimental sound, drawing variously from noise rock, indie rock, no wave, krautrock and jazz fusion. A prominent feature is a style of conscious lyricism, deadpan delivery and the use of sprechgesang vocals, which sit between singing and spoken word.

The earliest crank wave group was Dublin's Gilla Band, whose sound drew on post-punk, noise rock, indie rock and no wave. The band inspired the sound to be taken up by Idles, Fontaines D.C. and Silverbacks. The genre gained its earliest mainstream crossover in 2018 through the releases of Idles' Joy as an Act of Resistance, Fontaines D.C.'s "Chequeless Reckless/Boys in The Better Land" and Shame's Songs of Praise. The following year, Fontaines D.C.'s Dogrel and Black Midi's Schlagenheim brought the genre fully into the mainstream. The sound became particularly prominent amongst the Windmill scene, a post-punk scene in south London. Around this time, Dan Carey began to produce many acts in the genre, incorporating his own influences from hip hop into their sound.

During the early 2020s, a new wave of acts adopted the style including Yard Act, Wet Leg and Squid, as its sound proliferated across the United Kingdom post-punk scene, which some publications coined "landfill Sprechgesang" or "landfill post-punk". Around 2024, crank wave began to drift from the mainstream, when major acts changed their sounds or disbanded and its place in the scene was displaced by the different sounds of the Last Dinner Party and Heartworms. Around this time, crank wave was adopted by acts in foreign countries, particularly Poland.

The category was first attested to by Louder than War editor John Robb in May 2019, who coined it "wonk", while "crank wave" was coined in September 2019 by writer Mark Beaumont in an article for NME. In 2021, writer Matthew Perpetua coined the term "the Post-Brexit New Wave" in an article for NPR Music.

== Etymology ==
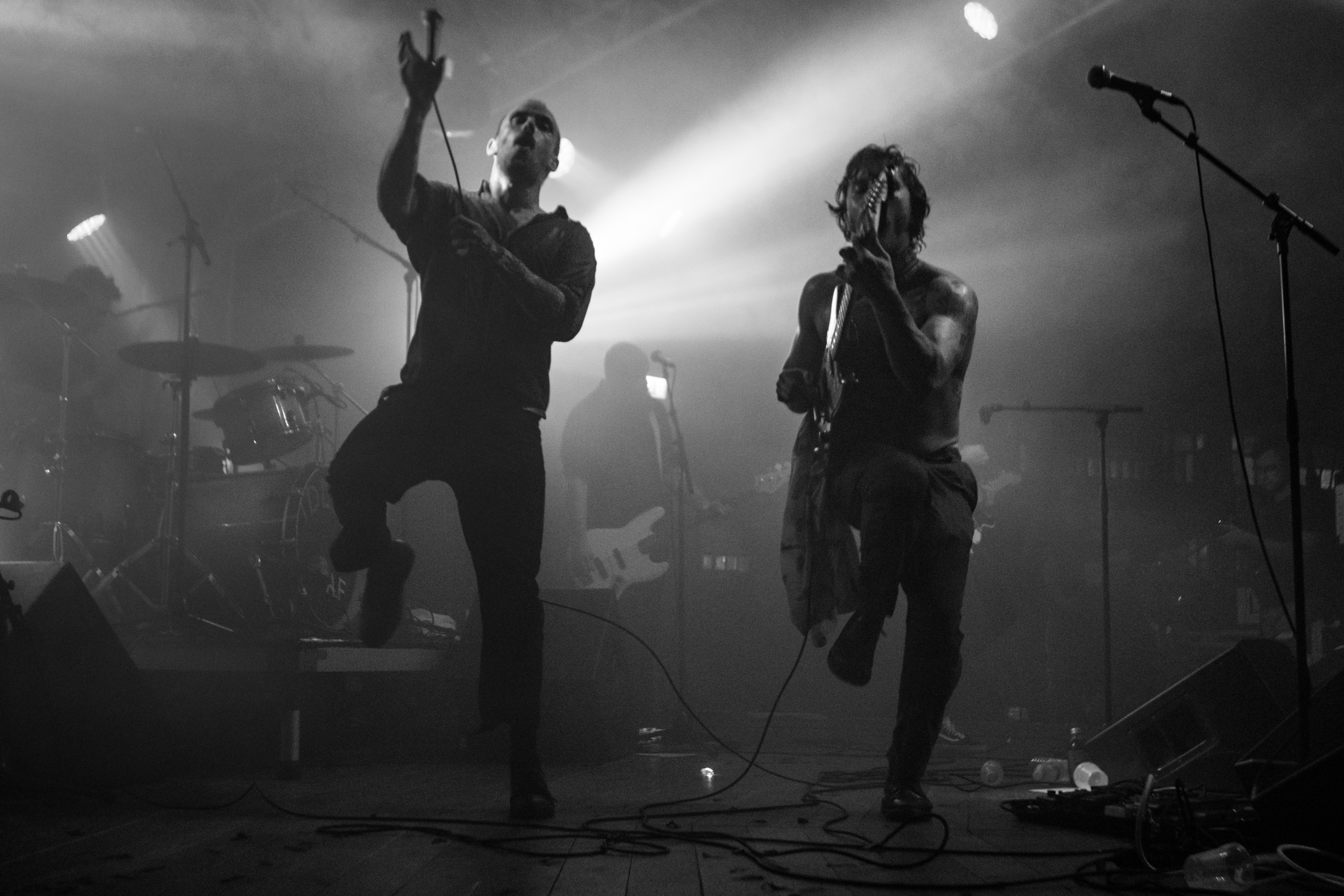
Idles at Haldern Pop Festival 2017

The category was first attested to by Louder than War editor John Robb in May 2019. In his article, Robb coined the term "wonk" in reference to the style and included Fontaines D.C. and Idles, but also groups that did not fit into subsequent definitions of the genre, including Sleaford Mods, Soft Play and Fat White Family. In September 2019, NME writer Mark Beaumont instead coined the term "crank wave", using a similar definition to Robb. He cited the song "Match Bet" by Squid along with Idles, Fontaines D.C., Do Nothing, Life and Famous as inspiring the phrase. Another synonym is "the post-Brexit new wave". This name was coined in 2021 by NPR writer Matthew Perpetua who stated of it "there's a new subgenre emerging and no one has given it a name yet".

Beaumont had previously coined the term "gristle rock" in March 2019, to refer to the South London post-punk scene's "art-sleaze-punk-freak" community that included Fat White Family and Shame. In his 10 September column, he referenced gristle rock and crank wave as being intertwined, but not synonymous. He later described gristle rock as "gruesome post-punk, torture-chamber Velvets and twisted rock'n'roll". By 2025, "Windmill indie" had become a common synonym for crank wave, in reference to South London venue the Windmill, which was central to the area's post-punk scene. The Independent, writer Kieran Read argued that although the Windmill scene bands were often compared, "they don’t actually sound all that alike" and that of them, only Black Midi were a defining crank wave band.

Livore writer Alessandro Corona Mendozza noted that due to the name's use of "wave", crank wave is sometimes mistaken as a musical movement. In 2023, he observed that the category had experienced a semantic bleaching, due to it being applied to a wide variety of rock and electronic artists whose styles do not fit its borders, including Black Country, New Road, Lice and Snapped Ankles.

== Characteristics ==
Yard Act based their sound around a deadpan talk-singing sprechgesang style, a core element of crank wave

The vocal style of crank wave is influenced by Mark E. Smith of English post-punk band the Fall. Tablet described the Post-Brexit New Wave as British groups drawing influence from the "sing-talking" style of David Byrne of Talking Heads. The style is characterized by the use of deadpan, disaffected and apathetic "talk-singing" also known as sprechgesang in German, as well as angular guitarwork and large leading basslines. Artists tend to be described as anxious, socially conscious and intellectual. Mark Beaumont described the sound of crank wave as "smart, modern guitar bands with a singer who sounds like someone having a psychotic episode in a debating society".

Artists often draw from a wide variety of influences, including noise rock, kraut rock, progressive rock and jazz fusion. NPR noted elements of hip hop in the spoken word cadences of some acts in the genre, noting their similarity to UK hip hop artists Kae Tempest and the Streets, as well as UK drill and trap music. Hip hop elements became particularly prominent around 2019 due to producer Dan Carey's influence from the genre. According to Clash magazine, crank wave is distinct to the 2000s post-punk revival due to the scene taking more of an "experimental form".

Perpetua defined the groups as primarily stemming from the United Kingdom and Ireland, he stated the musicians had "internalized more recent musical and cultural trends" and "disappointment and pessimism about Britain's future". He cited Black Country, New Road's early style as drawing from contemporary media such as "micro-influencers, PR teams, online forum threads, UE Booms and NutriBullets".

== History ==
=== Precursors ===
Publications including Australian Broadcasting Corporation and Mowno have noted Mclusky's second album Mclusky Do Dallas (2002) as an early precursor of crank wave due to its noisey instrumental style, sprechgesang vocal delivery and satirical lyrics.

The early 2000s had popularised the post-punk revival, a movement of post-punk-indebted indie rock. In the United Kingdom, it proliferated into landfill indie, a wave of increasingly derivative acts. By the late 2000s, the post-punk revival had declined. Soon, a new wave of groups began to form that played music more closely resembling the original sound of post-punk. This included British acts Savages, Eagulls, Sleaford Mods and Algiers, as well as northern European groups Viagra Boys, Iceage and Holograms. By 2014, Eagulls, Algiers, Gilla Band, Ought and Iceage had begun to expand their sound into different direction, initiating a period sometimes called "post-post-punk". That year saw the increase popularity of Sleaford Mods, a previously rarely known group, due to the release of their seventh album, Divide and Exit, which merged spoken word, hip hop and post-punk. A 2022 article by The Quietus noted the album as "one of the most influential British releases of the previous decade" and crediting it with inspiring the majority of acts in crank wave.

=== Origins and early popularity (2015–2018) ===
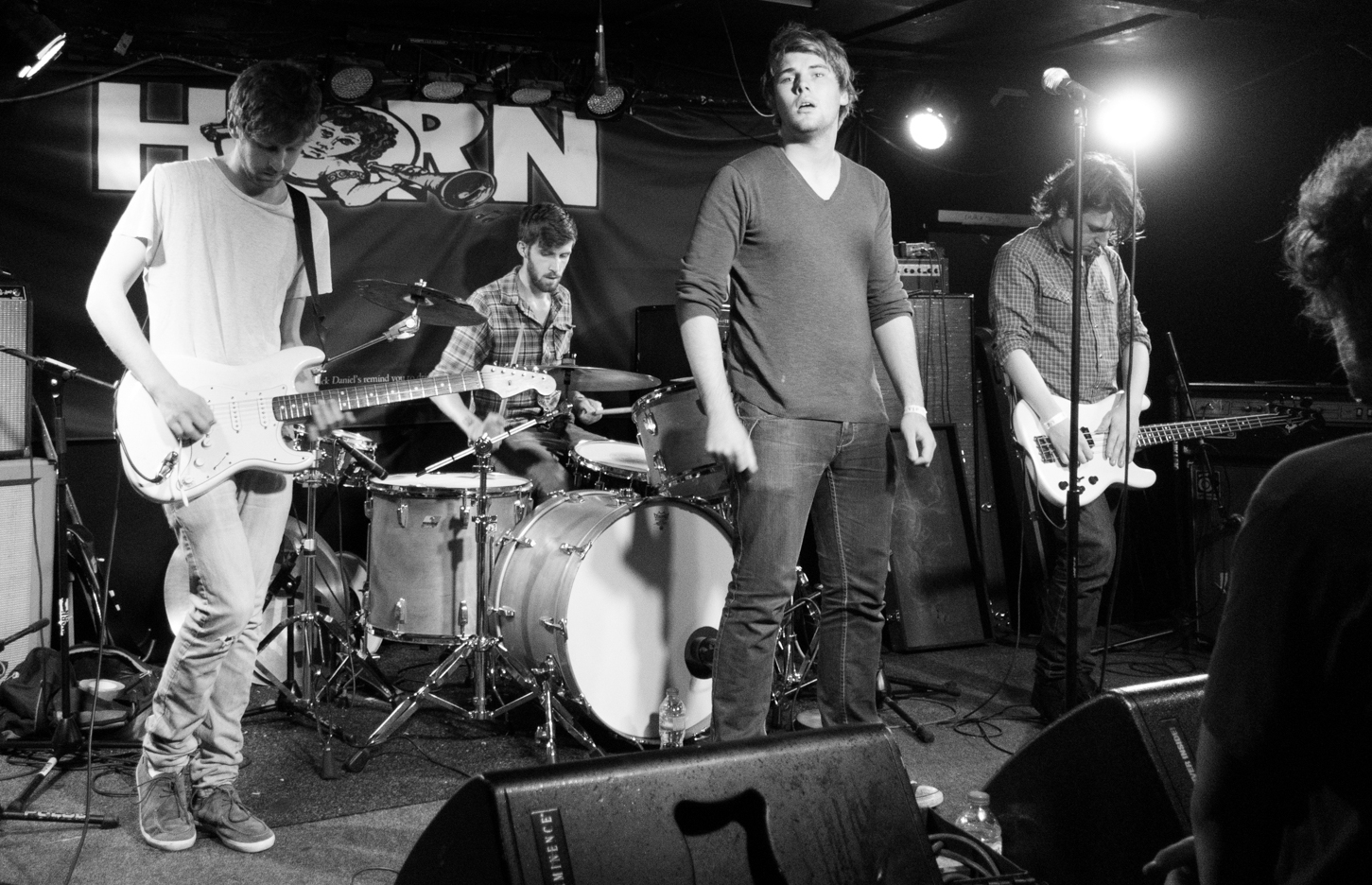
Gilla Band were an early pioneer of crank wave

Dublin's Gilla Band were credited by Pitchfork writer Laura Snapes as the initiators of the sound that would become crank wave. Gilla Band's sound was formed through a conscious effort to avoid sounding like landfill indie or Radiohead, two sounds that dominated the Dublin underground. Instead, they drew upon no wave groups like Theoretical Girls and DNA, as well as noise rock, but also LCD Soundsystem's 2000s post-punk revival. They released their debut album Holding Hands with Jamie in 2015, which was widely influential in Ireland, inspiring Fontaines D.C., Silverbacks and the Murder Capital. Fontaines D.C. vocalist Grian Chatten stated in 2019 that Gilla Band inspired a wave of Irish bands to stop looking to England for inspiration, and instead begin "discovering itself and its own identity again".

According to The Mancunion, 2018 marked a "turning point" in the alternative scene with the release of Fontaines D.C.'s single "Chequeless Reckless" backed with "Boys in The Better Land", as well as English acts, including Idles Joy as an Act of Resistance (2018) and Shame's Songs of Praise. Bristol's Idles formed in 2009, but their on earlier recorded work they were still indebted to the style of the early 2000s post-punk acts, particularly Interpol the Walkmen, Foals and the Maccabees. They began to pursue a more chaotic style on 2015 EP Meat. Of their subsequent sound, guitarist Mark Bowen stated in 2024, "I hope we destroy rock 'n' roll. It has ruined everything! That is our ambition as a band. Inspired by Gilla Band, a guitar band that barely sounds like a guitar band anymore." In a separate, 2019 interview, vocalist Joe Talbot stated "I thought that [Gilla Band's second album The Talkies] was going to get loads of kiddies into noise-rock and stuff, but it didn’t.... maybe IDLES need to do it?" Idles popularised this sound in the mainstream on their debut album Brutalism. The album led to the band opening for the Maccabees, Foo Fighters and Future Islands. According to HeadStuff, Idles' second album made them figure heads of the movement, with sell-out tours along with nominations at the BRIT and Kerrang! awards. The success of Idles allowed many subsequent punk and post-punk influenced groups to gain wider attention in the United Kingdom.

=== Mainstream crossover (2019–2024) ===
Black Midi brought mainstream attention to crank wave around 2019

In 2019, the release of Schlagenheim by Black Midi and Dogrel by Fontaines D.C. brought widespread internet attention to crank wave. Both were produced by Sexwitch's Dan Carey who introduced Sleaford Mods' UK rap-inspired cadences into each bands' music. The style received increased attention following Black Midi's performance at the Mercury Prize. The success of these albums led the style to be adopted by Yard Act, Melt Yourself Down and Squid and elements of it to be incorporated into the post-rock music of Black Country, New Road. A wave of new bands also formed, including Working Men's Club, Wet Leg and Legss.

In a 2021 interview, Yard Act vocalist James Smith mentioned in a that the band's adopting of the style was due to Idles, Shame and Fontaines D.C. popularizing the style, stating: "We definitely Trojan Horsed it, to get a bit of attention [off] the back of some of those groups but knowing we were gonna subvert it and move away from it as soon as we can. Which sounds quite cynical." Kinney concluded in stating "The problem, instead, lies with bands who are talking loud but have little of use to say."

It was particularly influential upon acts in the Windmill scene, many of whom merged it with influence from the Louisville post-rock sound, with some of these acts being signed to Carey's record label Speedy Wunderground. The scene began to be acknowledged by mainstream outlets like NPR Music and The Independent in the early 2020s as an emerging force in British guitar music. By 2022, crank wave bands were seeing heavy airplay on British radio and playing high on the lineups of major festivals. Acts such as Black Midi had previously performed at Coachella in 2022 and in 2025, groups such as Wet Leg rose to prominence and performed at Glastonbury.

=== British and Irish decline and adoption elsewhere (2024–present) ===
By 2024, new British groups were failing to gain these large followings by playing crank wave, as the scene's attention shifted towards acts with different sounds, such as the Last Dinner Party and Heartworms. That year Fontaines D.C. and Yard Act changed their sounds and Black Midi disbanded. In 2025, the publication Idioteq published an article on the Polish underground music scene which involved groups such as Loveworms, who were self-described as crank wave and drawing influence from crank wave groups such as Dry Cleaning. Theoberlingrape described the genre as "spawning" acts such as Geese, notably their album 3D Country.

== Response ==
Critical pushback on the lack of innovation, and homogeneity, of some of the bands under this umbrella has led to some referring to the bands they deem less interesting as "landfill post-punk", a term referencing landfill indie. The term was coined by Sam Dynes in 2019, writing for The Mancunion, who stated that "a clear fondness for Mark E Smith runs through most of the lesser bands to the point of parody". In 2022, writing for The Quietus, Fergal Kinney published an article on "Landfill Sprechgesang", which criticized Yard Act's The Overload as exhibiting a "reliance on archetypes, their convenient adoption of influences and the undercooked limitations of their sound". The article cited lead singer James Smith drawing influence from the Fall as "an influence that sounds derivative to the point of parody", adding that "Hand-wringing liberal tokenism was antipathetic to Mark E. Smith".

Fergal Kinney, for The Quietus stated that Pitchfork had earlier criticized Idles' 2020 single 'Model Village' as "being 'patronising' and trading in class stereotypes". The band later announced that they would no longer be performing the song. In 2020, Lias Saoudi of Fat White Family criticized Idles for "grandstanding on that woke ticket". According to The Guardian, Sleaford Mods had also accused Idles of "working class appropriation". Saoudi stated in a Facebook post, "the last thing our increasingly puritanical culture needs right now is a bunch of self-neutering middle-class boobs telling us to be nice to immigrants; you might call that art, I call it sententious pedantry".

According to the New Yorker, in 2021 British group Squid "laughed" at being labeled crank wave by the NME as their music was "not that angry". In 2022, Black Midi's bassist Cameron Picton criticised the label "the post-Brexit new wave" stating, "I don't think there's actually any bearing of Brexit on any of our music. And if you were going to call anything post-Brexit, it would be the bands that are starting out now", adding that post-Brexit was a "really poor term to lump these bands together". Though he acknowledged that the usage of the term was "advantageous".

== See also ==
- Calgary sound
- No wave
- Indie sleaze
- Spoken word
- Sass
