= Snake Sideways =

Studio album by Do Nothing
- Released: 30 June 2023
- Studio: Modal Studios
- Genres: Rock; art rock; post-punk
- Length: 38:36
- Label: Exact Truth
- Producer: Andy Savours

Snake Sideways is the debut studio album by Nottingham band Do Nothing, released by Exact Truth on 30 June 2023. Upon release, Snake Sideways received generally favorable reviews, with critics expressing varied assessments of the album's more subdued and experimental approach compared to earlier releases.

== Background and recording ==
Snake Sideways was written following the release of several EPs, including Zero Dollar Bill in 2020 and Glueland in 2021. Describing the writing process as a "terrible time", vocalist Chris Bailey stated that he encountered writer's block and anxiety during the creation of the debut, The element of "panic" and "unhealthily obsessive" recording process led Bailey to be "more candid" in his lyricism, stating that the lyrics came from a "very honest space" about "being in a tough spot and trying to see a way out of it". Bailey cited the musician Tom Waits and electronic band Underworld as inspirations for the direction of the album. The album was produced by Andy Savours and mixed by Oli Barton Wood.

== Release and promotion ==
The lead single, Happy Feet, was directed by Luke Ainger and released in February 2023. Snake Sideways was announced by the band in April 2023 and released on 30 June. The album announcement coincided with the release of the second single, Amoeba, directed by Clump Collective. To support the album, the band launched a headline tour in the United Kingdom and Ireland in September and October 2023.

== Critical reception ==
Professional ratings
Aggregate scores
Source	Rating
Metacritic	75%
Review scores
Source	Rating
Clash	8/10
DIY	4/5 stars
The Line of Best Fit	7/10
Loud and Quiet	6/10
NME	3/5 stars

According to review aggregator website Metacritic, Snake Sideways received "generally favorable" reviews from critics. Amrit Virdi praised the album for playing to the band's strengths, describing it as a "mature and polished version of their experimental sound" and highlighting the "stark and honest" lyricism. Rolling Stone UK stated that "the emotion of early stand-out ‘Happy Feet’ evokes the euphoric highs of noughties NYC indie, while ‘Moving Target’ is a beautifully restrained effort that shows they're capable of ballad-lite moments too." Noting the "newly introspective" tone of the album, Max Pilley of NME considered the album to have an "enigmatic charm" and signs of musical evolution, but felt the "freshness" of the band's earlier recordings was "no longer so obvious". Chris Taylor of DIY similarly considered the album to be a "far cry" from earlier songs, but considered the "raw nerves" of the lyricism and "spikiness" of the music to "bring a sense of hope" to the album. Ross Horton of The Line of Best Fit considered the album to be functional but indistinct from other contemporary post-punk bands, stating "Everything here works, but that’s hardly great praise." Stuart Stubbs of Loud and Quiet commended the band in being "adamant to try new things".

== Track listing ==
Snake Sideways track listing
No.	Title	Length
1.	"Nerve"	3:03
2.	"Happy Feet"	4:11
3.	"Snake Sideways"	4:39
4.	"Fine"	3:42
5.	"Ivy"	3:39
6.	"Hollywood Learn"	4:33
7.	"The Needle"	3:48
8.	"Amoeba"	3:52
9.	"Moving Target"	3:51
10.	"Sunshine State"	3:18
Total length:		38:36

== Personnel ==
- Andrew Harrison, Charlie Howarth, Chris Bailey, Kasper Sandstrøm - band
- Andy Savours - producer, engineer
- Felix Davis - mastering
- Oli Barton-Wood - mixing
- Josh Rumble, Matt Facey, Ned Prevezer - assistant engineer
