= The Windmill, Brixton =

Pub and live music venue in London

The Windmill
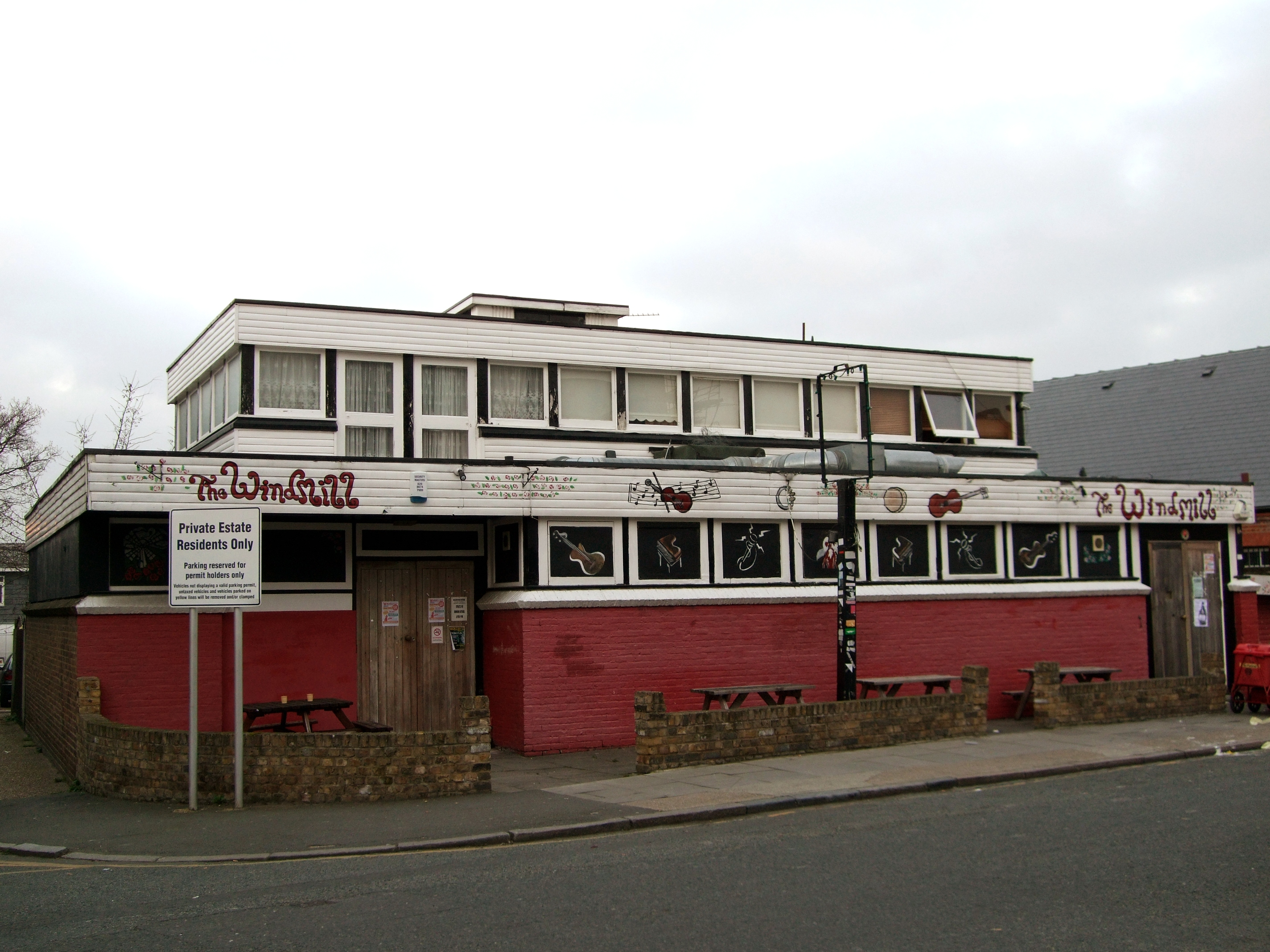
- The Windmill
- Interactive map of The Windmill
- Location: Brixton, London, England
- Coordinates: 51.45396°N 0.12254°W

Construction
- Opened: 1990s

Website
- www.windmillbrixton.co.uk

The Windmill is a pub and live music venue in Brixton, London, England, with a reputation for championing new music. It was voted the third best music venue in London, in a 2012 poll in Time Out magazine, and number 7 by The Guardian in 2008, and has been described as "one of the top-10 music venues in the U.K.". Many bands who have served as resident acts in the Windmill have now been described as part of the Windmill scene, such as Black Country, New Road, Squid, Shame and Black Midi.

== History ==
The pub was built in 1971 for the adjacent Blenheim Gardens housing estate. It was named after the neighbouring heritage site of the only lasting (and working) windmill (aka Ashby's Mill) in the London area. It went through various phases of being a bar that attracted locals, bikers, and the Irish community; by the end of the 1990s, it was hosting DJs, poets and the occasional live bands. Around 2002, the Windmill shifted focus onto live music. Early gigs included a semi-secret double bill of Calexico and Kurt Wagner (of Lambchop) followed by a gig by the 5.6.7.8's, just after they had appeared as the house band in Quentin Tarantino's Kill Bill: Volume 1. A Rottweiler dog living on the roof of the venue (known as "Roof Dog") became the Windmill's mascot, until its death in August 2015.

Bands to have played gigs at The Windmill include: ...And You Will Know Us by the Trail of Dead, Bloc Party, Caitlin Rose, the Crimea, Damo Suzuki, Guillemots, Hot Chip, Los Campesinos!, Scritti Politti, Sorry, Stereolab, and the Vaccines.

From the late 2010s to the early 2020s the Windmill has been connected with a resurgence of the South London guitar rock scene now known as the Windmill scene, including bands such as Black Country, New Road, Squid, Fat White Family, and Black Midi.

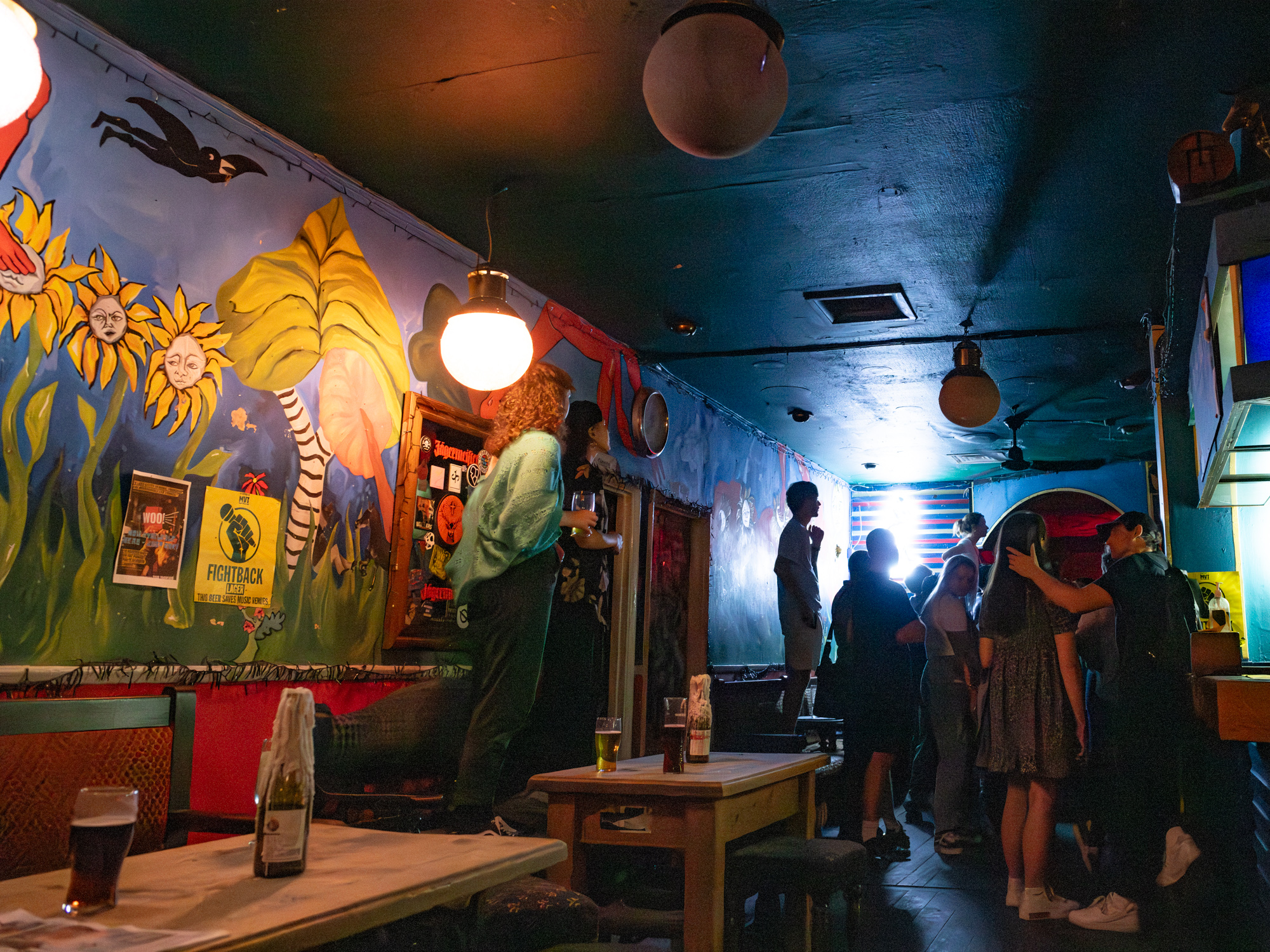
Inside The Windmill

== See also ==
- Crank wave
- Queen's Head, Brixton
- Chunk (collective)
