= Divorce (band) =

British alternative country band

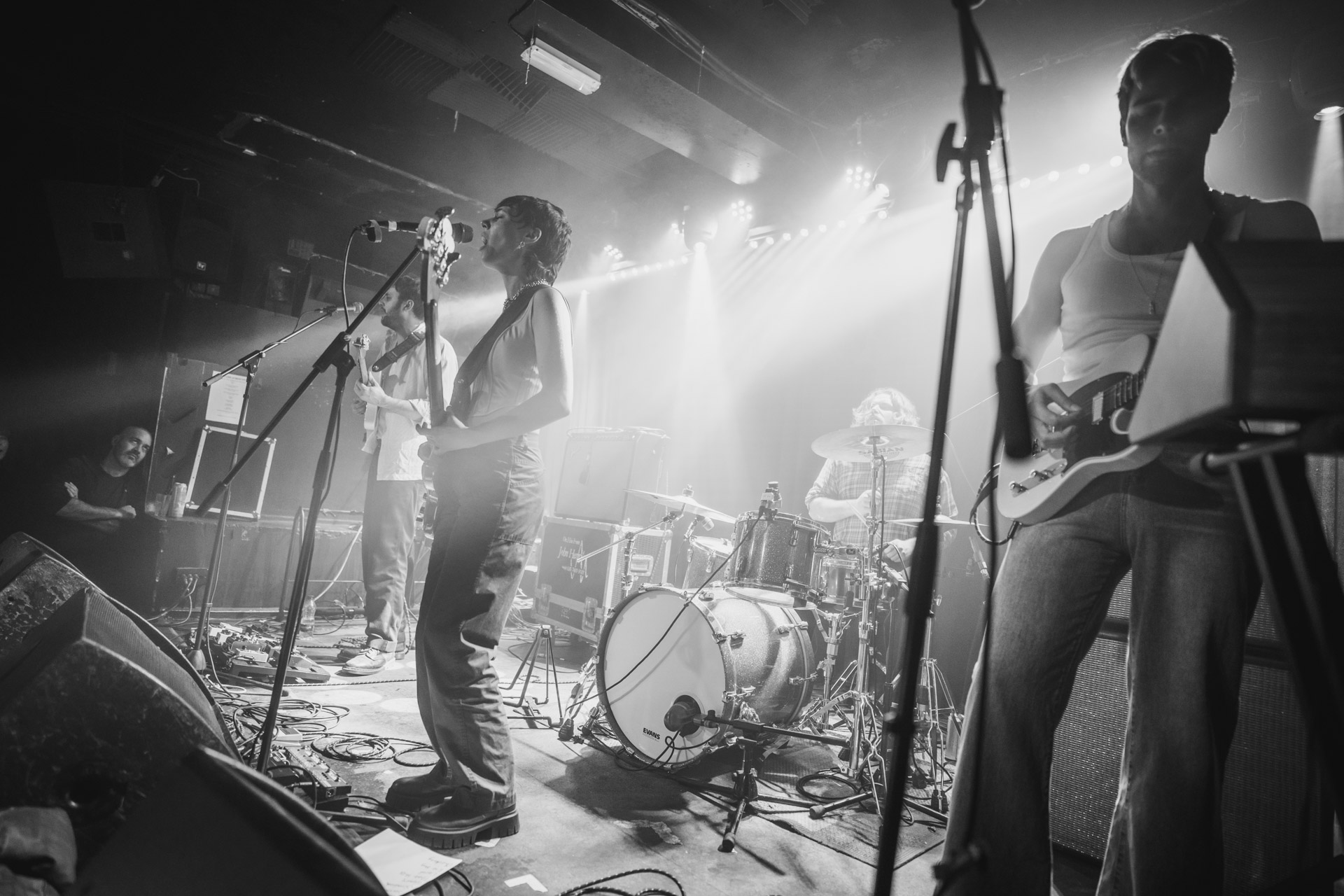
- Divorce at The Lexington, Islington in 2024

Background information
- Origin: Nottingham, UK
- Genres: Alternative country; folk; indie rock; punk rock; grunge; shoegaze
- Years active: 2021–present
- Labels: Capitol; Gravity Inc
- Members: Tiger Cohen-Towell; Felix Mackenzie-Barrow
- Past members: Adam Peter-Smith; Kasper Sandstrom
- Website: www.divorcehq.co.uk

Divorce is a British alternative country band from Nottingham, consisting of vocalist and bassist Tiger Cohen-Towell, and co-vocalist Felix Mackenzie-Barrow.

First releasing music in 2021, the band has released two EPs, Get Mean (2022) and Heady Metal (2023), which they followed up with their debut album, Drive to Goldenhammer (2025).

On May 12th 2026, the band announced Adam Peter-Smith and Kasper Sandstrom would leave the band to prioritise their personal lives.

== History ==
All four members of the band met at age 16 through the music scene in Nottingham. Smith was initially a solo artist, whereas Towell and Barrow were a musical duo and Sandstrom was in the Nottingham band Do Nothing, a position he still holds. They decided to form a band while sitting on a hill in Nottingham, choosing to also each take up instruments different to the ones they already played. The band began releasing music in 2021. At the time, Towell frequently wore a blonde wig when performing, though they later stopped wearing it.

In July 2022 they released their single "Pretty". Get Mean, the group's debut EP, was released later that year.

Divorce spent some of 2023 building a back-catalogue of releases. They released single "Birds" in June, produced by Matt Peel, and in September they released their single "Scratch Your Metal", which was featured on the A-list on BBC Radio 6 Music, hosted by Ezra Furman. Their EP Heady Metal, about "identity and being unsure of it", was released on 17 November 2023. They lined up a UK headline tour as well as a supporting role for The Vaccines for early 2024. They received four stars out of five from The Evening Standard for their performance at the Lexington, Islington in January; the paper said that the singers' harmonies "were wed to one another in complete synchronicity", and that they brought a crowd of varied ages. In the first half of 2024 they also supported Bombay Bicycle Club and Everything Everything. A limited-edition Record Store Day vinyl repress of Heady Metal sold out with speed.

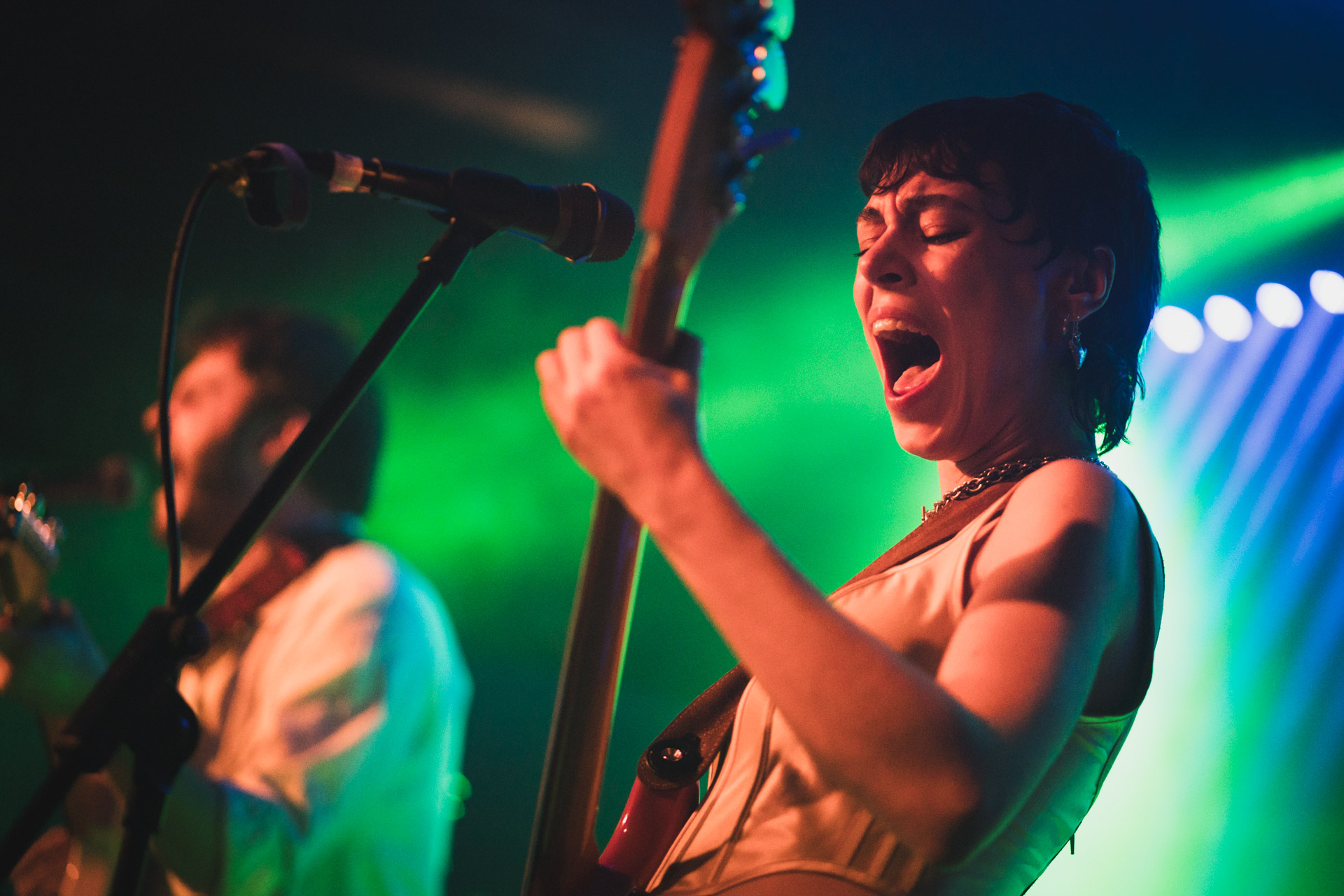
Tiger Cohen-Towell (front), and Felix Mackenzie-Barrow (back) are co-vocalists in the band

They released the single "Gears" in March 2024. "My Room", the band's June 2024 single, was billed by Whynow as an "emotional ode to unconditional love" and was produced by Catherine Marks. They announced a headline UK tour for October, beginning with a four-night residency at Nottingham's Bodega which quickly sold out. This tour also included a show in London's Islington Assembly Hall, their biggest show thus far at that time. The band was receiving frequent play on Radio 6 Music by this point.

The band released singles "All My Freaks" in September 2024, and "Pill" in January 2025 in anticipation for their debut album Drive to Goldenhammer, which released on 7 March, also through Capitol subsidiary Gravity Records. The album was recorded at Real World Studios in Wiltshire with producer Marks, and according to Cohen is "written from the perspective of a humorous/tragic caricature of an up-and-coming artist". The Guardian called the album "richly executed," and "emotionally resonant", and Far Out gave it four of five stars, calling it "a sprawling organic offering that refuses to remain still".

On 12 May 2026, Adam Peter-Smith and Kasper Sandstrøm announced via Instagram that they were leaving the band, stating that they needed “to prioritise our personal lives.” Their departure left Tiger Cohen-Towell and Felix Mackenzie-Barrow to continue Divorce as a duo.

== Artistry ==
The band have described themselves as "Wilco meets ABBA," and have listed Perfume Genius, Belle and Sebastian and Queen as inspirations for Drive to Goldenhammer. They are known for their harmonies, folk guitars and, according to DIY, "live shows imbued with humour and heart." While mostly considered an alternative country band, they have also taken on aspects of folk, indie, punk, grunge and shoegaze.

== Discography ==
=== Albums ===
- Drive to Goldenhammer (2025)

=== EPs ===
- Get Mean (2022)
- Heady Metal (2023)

=== Singles ===
- "Pretty" (2022)
- "Birds" (2023)
- "Scratch Your Metal" (2023)
- "Gears" (2024)
- "My Room" (2024)
- "All My Freaks" (2025)
- "Pill" (2025)
