= Chris Haigh =

British fiddle player, author, and educator

Chris Haigh is a British fiddle player, author, and music educator. He is known for his work as a session musician and for writing instructional material on a variety of fiddle styles, including jazz, klezmer, folk, and world music.

== Career ==
Haigh has worked as a session musician with many artists, including Alison Moyet and All About Eve. He released his debut solo album, Off the Wall, in 2010. A critical review in Maverick magazine concluded by stating it is "good fiddle music with much to recommend it".

=== Teaching and writing ===
Haigh has written multiple instructional books for fiddle and violin, published by Schott Music. His works include Exploring Jazz Violin, Exploring Folk Fiddle, Exploring Klezmer Fiddle, and The Fiddle Handbook. These publications cover techniques, repertoire, and stylistic approaches to various traditional and modern fiddle styles. One of his more recent titles, Exploring Country and Bluegrass Fiddle, was reviewed in The Strad. He has taught at institutions including Middlesex University, Newcastle University, and Brunel University.

Haigh has conducted klezmer music workshops internationally, including in Malta in 2014.

== Selected publications ==
- Haigh, Chris (2009). The Fiddle Handbook. Backbeat Books. ISBN 978-0879309787.
- Haigh, Chris (2010). Exploring Jazz Violin. Schott Music. ISBN 978-1847612427.
- Haigh, Chris (2012). Discovering Rock Violin. Schott Music. ISBN 9781847612670.
- Haigh, Chris (2014). Exploring Folk Fiddle. Schott Music. ISBN 978-1847615015.
- Haigh, Chris (2015). Exploring Klezmer Fiddle. Schott Music. ISBN 9781847615695.
- Haigh, Chris (2021). Discovering Rock Violin. Schott Music. ISBN 978-1847615268.
- Haigh, Chris (2021). Exploring Country and Bluegrass Fiddle. Schott Music. ISBN 9783795714895.
- Haigh, Chris (2024). Beginning Folk Fiddle: A Beginners Guide to Folk Styles and Technique on the Violin. Schott Music. ISBN 9783795731298.
