= Sorry (band) =

English indie band

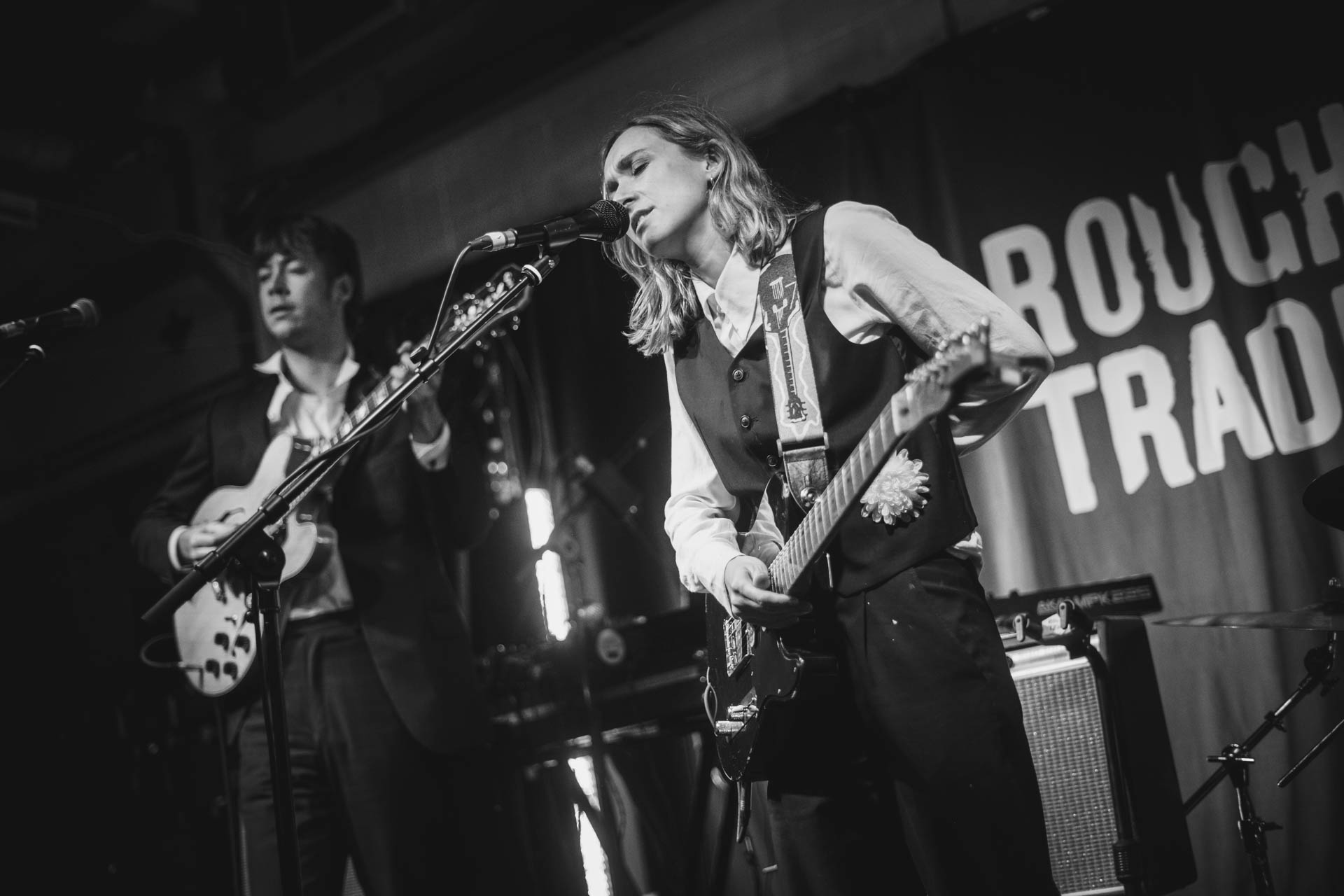
- Sorry at Rough Trade in 2022

Background information
- Also known as: Fish (2014–2016)
- Origin: North London, England
- Genre: Indie rock
- Years active: 2014–present
- Label: Domino
- Members: Asha Lorenz; Louis O'Bryen; Lincoln Barrett; Campbell Baum (Vibe Manager); Marco Pini
- Website: sorryband.co.uk

Sorry (previously named Fish) are an English indie rock band from North London. The band members are Asha Lorenz, Louis O'Bryen, Lincoln Barrett, Campbell Baum and Marco Pini. The band's debut studio album, 925, was released in 2020, following the release of several mixtapes and singles.

Sorry is signed to the London-based independent record label Domino.

== History ==
=== Formation and early releases ===
The band formed in 2014, using the name Fish. In 2016, they changed their name to Sorry.

Lorenz and O'Bryen published several covers of Jimi Hendrix songs before embarking on original projects. Between 2017 and 2020, Sorry released various singles and mixtapes containing original material, much of which would later appear on the band's debut studio album. To this day, Lorenz and O'Bryen write the majority of their songs as a duo while Barrett, Baum and Pini complete the band for live sets.

=== Debut studio album and tour ===
On 27 March 2020, Sorry released its debut studio album, 925. It contains four previously released singles: "More", "Right Round the Clock", "Snakes" and "Starstruck". On Metacritic, it has a score of 79, indicating "generally favorable reviews". Many critics praised the album's cohesiveness and innovative sound. Stereogum named 925 "album of the week" on 24 March 2020. A less favorable Guardian review stated that "925 packs in more than a few disruptive ideas. But Sorry haven't yet acquired the musical vocabulary to pull them off."

The album charted on the UK Independent Albums Chart, where it peaked at number 13, and on the Scottish Albums Chart, where it peaked at number 49. The band planned to embark on a UK headlining tour to promote the album's release but had to postpone the tour dates due to the COVID-19 pandemic.

In February 2021, Sorry announced a live album recorded at the South London venue Windmill, Brixton, with proceeds going toward the venue, which faced financial difficulties in the wake of the COVID-19 pandemic.

=== Anywhere But Here ===
On 12 July 2022, Sorry announced their second album, Anywhere but Here. It was released on 7 October through Domino Records, along with its first single, "Let the Lights On". The album was recorded with Portishead's Adrian Utley.

== Musical style and influences ==
Sorry's musical influences have caused debate amongst music critics and reviewers, many of whom refrain from sorting the band into a single genre. The Guardian has stated that "A typical Sorry track is just as likely to be inflected with 90s grunge as with jazz or trip-hop", thus defying traditional genre labels and categories. Lorenz and O'Bryen themselves have described their musical output as pop with O'Bryen commenting that "It's just a bit annoying to be called post-punk or grunge because I don't think we are that."

Sorry have cited influences including Hookworms, Hüsker Dü, the Lemonheads, Daniel Rossen, Portishead, the Streets, Radiohead, Guided by Voices, Alex G, Nirvana, Blood Red Shoes, the Strokes, Lush, Garbage, Courtney Barnett, Elliott Smith, Tears For Fears, Randy Newman, Frank Ocean and Pro Era.

== Members ==
- Asha Lorenz – lead vocals, guitars, production
- Louis O'Bryen – guitars, co-lead and backing vocals, production
- Lincoln Barrett – drums
- Campbell Baum – bass guitar, instrumentation
- Marco Pini – electronics, production

== Discography ==
Adapted from Spotify.

=== Albums ===
==== Studio albums ====
List of albums, with selected details and chart positions
Title	Album details	Peak chart positions		
Title	Album details	UK Sales	UK Indie	SCO
925	Released: 27 March 2020; Label: Domino	34	13	49
Anywhere but Here	Released: 7 October 2022; Label: Domino	22	11	—
Cosplay	Released: 7 November 2025; Label: Domino	27	10	74
"—" denotes a recording that did not chart or was not released in that territory.

==== Live albums ====
List of live albums, with selected details and chart positions
Title	Album details	Peak chart positions	
Title	Album details	UK Sales	UK Indie
A Night at the Windmill	Released: 12 March 2021; Label: Domino	79	26

=== Mixtapes ===
List of mixtapes albums, with selected details
Title	Mixtape details
Home Demo/ns vol. I	Released: 17 November 2017; Label: Self-released
Home Demo/ns vol. II	Released: 22 March 2018; Label: Self-released

=== Singles ===
Title	Year	Peak chart positions	Album
Title	Year	UK Sales	Album
"Daily Routine"	2016	—	Non-album single
"Battles"	2016	—	Home Demo/ns Vol I
"Wished"	2017	22	Non-album singles
"Lies"	2017	—	Non-album singles
"2 Down 2 Dance"	2018	15	Non-album singles
"Showgirl"	2018	8	Non-album singles
"Twinkle"	2018	—	Non-album singles
"Starstruck"	2018	—	925
"Jealous Guy"	2019	—	Non-album single
"Right Round the Clock"	2019	35	925
"Rock 'n' Roll Star"	2019	—	925
"More"	2020	—	925
"Snakes"	2020	—	925
"As the Sun Sets"	2020	—	925
"Cigarette Packet"	2021	5	Twixtustwain EP
"Separate"	2021	—	Twixtustwain EP
"There's So Many People That Want to Be Loved"	2022	15	Anywhere But Here
"Let the Lights On"	2022	11	Anywhere But Here
"Waxwing"	2024	—	Cosplay
"Jetplane"	2025	—	Cosplay
"Billy Elliot"	2026	—	Non-album singles
"Alone in Cologne"	2026	—	Non-album singles
"Tom Will Smack Your Ass"	2026	—	Non-album singles
"—" denotes a recording that did not chart or was not released in that territory.
