= 925 (album) =

Studio album by Sorry
- Released: 27 March 2020
- Length: 42:55
- Label: Domino
- Producer: James Dring

Sorry chronology
925 (2020)	A Night at the Windmill (2021)

Singles from 925
- 1. "Starstruck" Released: 5 November 2018; 2. "Right Round The Clock" Released: 21 October 2019; 3. "Rock 'n' Roll Star" Released: 25 November 2019; 4. "More" Released: 23 January 2020; 5. "Snakes" Released: 25 February 2020; 6. "As the Sun Sets" Released: 23 March 2020

925 is the debut studio album by English indie band Sorry. It was released on 27 March 2020 under Domino Recording Company.

== Critical reception ==
Professional ratings
Aggregate scores
Source	Rating
AnyDecentMusic?	7.7/10
Metacritic	79/100
Review scores
Source	Rating
AllMusic	4/5 stars
Beats Per Minute	76%
Clash	8/10
DIY	4.5/5 stars
Exclaim!	7/10
The Line of Best Fit	9.5/10
Loud and Quiet	8/10
NME	5/5 stars
Paste	6.9/10
Pitchfork	7.7/10

925 was met with generally favorable reviews from critics. At Metacritic, which assigns a weighted average rating out of 100 to reviews from mainstream publications, this release received an average score of 79, based on 15 reviews.

=== Accolades ===
Accolades for 925
Publication	Accolade	Rank	Ref.
Stereogum	Stereogum's 50 Best Albums of 2020 – Mid-Year	7	
Stereogum	The 50 Best Albums of 2020	20	
Under the Radar	Under the Radar's Top 100 Albums of 2020	35	

== Track listing ==
925 track listing
No.	Title	Length
1.	"Right Round The Clock"	4:04
2.	"In Unison"	2:47
3.	"Snakes"	3:41
4.	"Starstruck"	3:28
5.	"Rosie"	3:50
6.	"Perfect"	2:45
7.	"As The Sun Sets"	3:59
8.	"Wolf"	2:48
9.	"Rock 'n' Roll Star"	2:50
10.	"Heather"	3:23
11.	"More"	2:22
12.	"Ode To Boy"	2:51
13.	"Lies (Refix)"	4:07

== Charts ==
Chart performance for 925
Chart	Peak position
Scottish Albums (Official Charts)	49
UK Independent Albums (Official Charts)	13

== Release history ==
Release formats for 925
Country	Date	Format	Label	Ref.
Various	27 March 2020	CD; digital download; streaming; vinyl	Domino Music	
