= Do Nothing (band) =

English post-punk band

- Also known as: Field Studies (2012–2016)
- Origin: Nottingham, England
- Genres: Post-punk, crank wave, indie rock, art rock
- Years active: 2012–present
- Labels: Exact Truth, Denizen Recordings (2023), Submarine Cat Records (2026 - present)
- Members: Andrew Harrison; Charlie Howarth; Chris Bailey; Kasper Sandstrøm
- Website: donothingband.com

Do Nothing are an English post-punk band which formed in Nottingham in 2012.

The band met while in secondary school. Until 2016, Do Nothing performed under the name Field Studies. Under that name, they released two extended plays and four singles, and played at Glastonbury Festival in 2015.

The band renamed to Do Nothing in 2016. The new name was inspired by "a slogan a member once saw on a cap". In 2023, they released their debut album, Snake Sideways.

The album received "generally favorable reviews" according to review aggregate Metacritic with a score of 75 out of 100. Clash said the album has "a mature and polished version of their experimental sound". The Line of Best Fit's Ross Horton gave the album an overall score of 7/10, while noting, "It'd be wonderful if all bands opened their new albums with tracks that completely typify and summarise their approach", which he seems to believe Do Nothing has done with the opening track, "Nerve". NME gave the album 3/5 stars, while calling it "spritely post-punk packed with melody". The band toured Europe after the album was released. The band was scheduled to play at the 2024 South by Southwest festival in Austin, Texas, but pulled out citing the festival's financial ties with the US Army and RTX Corporation.

In June 2026, the band released "Stars" as a single for their second album, Friend World. The album itself was released on 06 November 2026 with other singles being The Nail, Act Natural, and Smile.

Guitarist Kasper Sandstrom was also the drummer in Nottingham band Divorce.

They cite influences including Black Midi, Squid, Black Country, New Road, Ought, LCD Soundsystem and Talking Heads.

== Discography ==
=== Studio albums ===
- Snake Sideways (2023)
- Friend World (2026)

=== EPs ===
- Celestial (2013) (As Field Studies)
- Rainmaking (2016) (As Field Studies)
- Zero Dollar Bill (2020)
- Glueland EP (2021)

=== Singles ===
- "Summer of Hate" (21 October 2024)
