= Hesse Kassel =

Chilean rock band

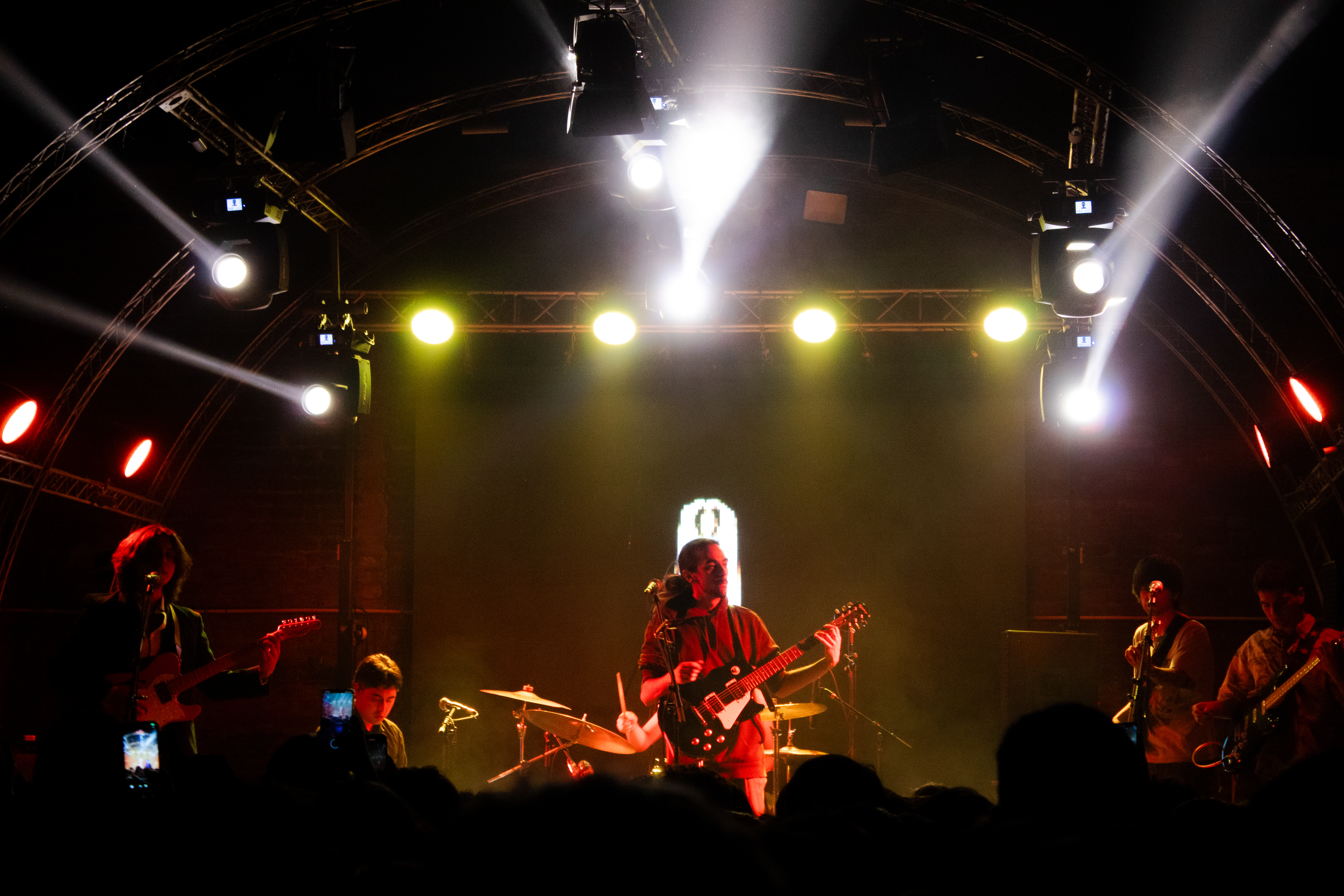
- Hesse Kassel performing live in 2025

Background information
- Origin: Santiago, Chile
- Genres: Post-rock; Art rock
- Years active: 2022–present
- Label: Quemasucabeza
- Members: Renatto Olivares; Luca Cosignani; Mauricio Rosas; Matthew Hopper; Eduardo Padilla; Joaquín González

Hesse Kassel is a Chilean post-rock band from Santiago, consisting of singer/guitarist/saxophonist Renatto Olivares, singer/guitarist Luca Cosignani, guitarist Mauricio Rosas, bassist Matthew Hopper, drummer Eduardo Padilla, and keyboardist Joaquín González. Their most recent album Morir Saltando was released in July 2026.

== History ==
Hesse Kassel was formed in Santiago in 2022, and began performing at venues in Chile's independent music scene. They began releasing singles in 2023, with the songs later appearing on their debut album. The band has described their music as experimental in nature, combining post-rock and art rock with elements of noise rock and jazz fusion. They have stated in interviews that their compositions seek to explore atmospheres and emotions through changes in intensity and varying rhythms, without adhering to traditional rock formulas.

Music journalists have compared the band's sound to God Speed You Black Emperor, Swans, and Black Country, New Road; and have drawn comparisons to the early British and American post-rock scenes. Brazilian music magazine Música Instantânea described Hesse Kassel's sound as a work of contrasts, with vulnerable lyrics intertwining with aggressive and unpredictable musical arrangements.

Their debut album La Brea was released in March 2025 and received widespread notice in Chilean music media, with journalists hailing the band as a leader in the nation's growing rock scene. Consequence named La Brea one of the 50 best albums of 2025, calling it "the most awe-inspiring debut of the year." The Quietus called La Brea "a truly inexplicable, revelatory debut" and "an elemental listening experience that makes everything feel new, exciting, and possible."

Later in 2025 the band released the documentary Hesse Kassel: Rumbo a La Brea, featuring live performance footage from the previous two years. They opened a festival show in Chile for Primal Scream in late 2025, and were booked to perform at the following year's Lollapalooza Chile festival. In late 2025 the band was nominated in the Best Independent Album and Best Live Show categories at the annual Indigo Awards, organized by Industria Musical Independiente de Chile.

In 2026, following the release of the single "Sancho Plagio" previewing an upcoming album, Hesse Kassel won the award for Best New Artist at Premios Pulsar 2026. They opened for the British band Shame during their 2026 tour of Latin America. Hesse Kassel's second album Morir Saltando was released in July 2026. The magazine Everything Is Noise praised the album for surpassing the achievements of its predecessor, achieving a more personal sound that is less dependent on the band's influences, while adding elements of post-hardcore and Latin jazz to the band's songwriting.

== Members ==
- Renatto Olivares – lead vocals, saxophone, guitar (2022-present)
- Luca Cosignani – guitar, vocals (2022-present)
- Mauricio Rosas – guitar (2022-present)
- Matthew Hopper – bass (2022-present)
- Eduardo Padilla – drums (2022-present)
- Joaquín González – keyboards, backing vocals (2022-present)

== Discography ==
=== Albums ===
- La Brea (2025)
- Morir Saltando (2026)
