= Queen's Head, Brixton =

Pub in Stockwell, London

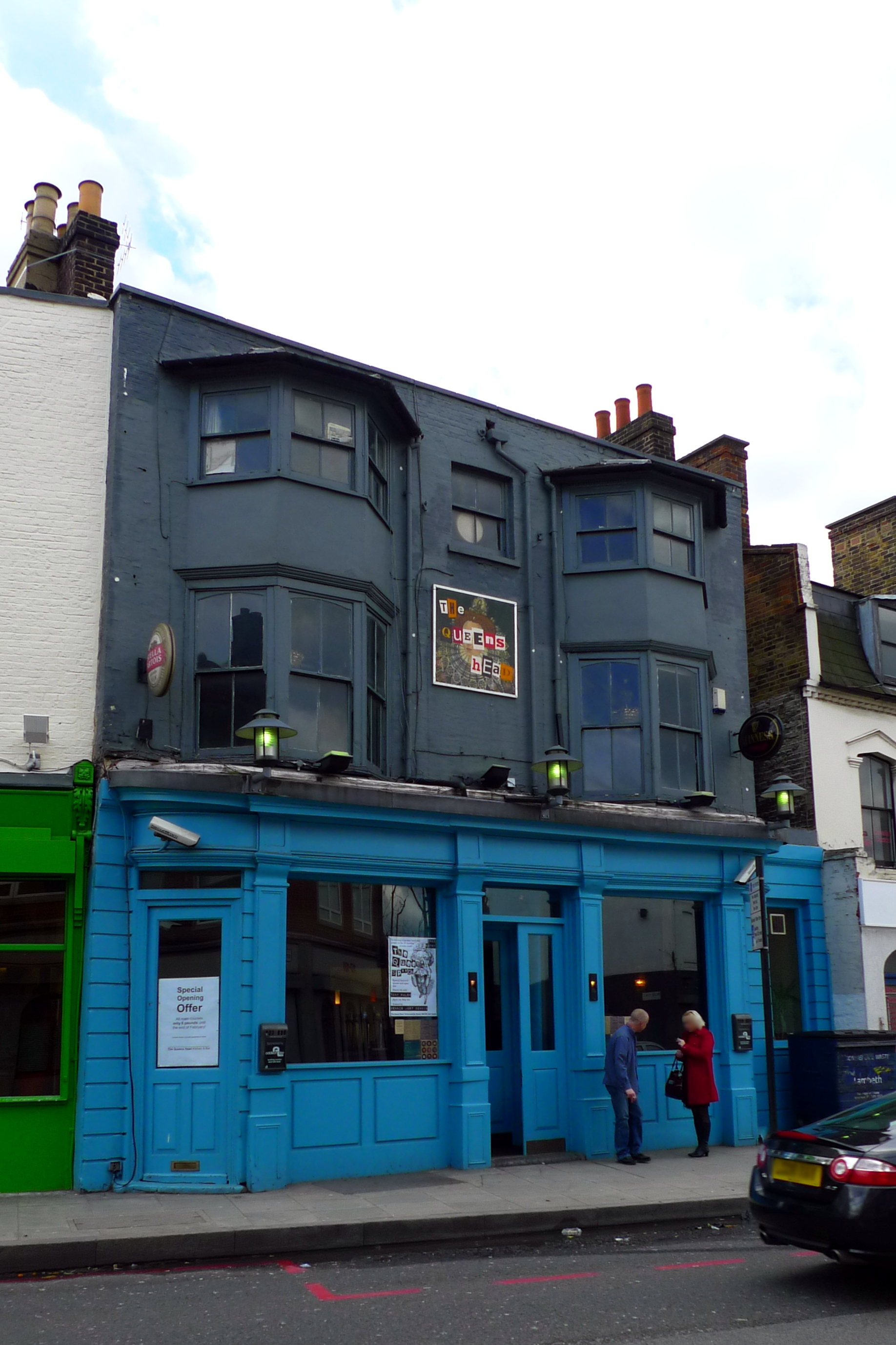
- The Queen's Head, Brixton, London SW9

- Location within London Borough of Lambeth Location within Greater London

General information
- Location: 144 Stockwell Road, Brixton, London, England
- Coordinates: 51.467282°N 0.118137°W
- Opened: c. 1786
- Closed: January 2024

Design and construction
- Designations

Listed Building – Grade II
- Official name: Queen's Head Public House
- Designated: 27 March 1981
- Reference no.: 1064933

The Queen's Head was a pub at 144 Stockwell Road, Brixton, London SW9.

It is a Grade II listed building, "of Regency appearance with alterations".

== History ==
The pub was originally named The New Queen's Head, and A History of Brixton asserts that it is in its original building from 1786. Brixton Heritage Trails states its construction replaced an older pub with a similar name. The "New" in the name was presumably to differentiate itself from The Old Queen's Head that was also in the same area, then known as Stockwell Green.

In 1894 an accepted tender for "additions and alterations" was reported in the construction trade periodical The Builder.

In the 1990s it was run under the name The Far Side, but by 2001 it was called The Z-Bud.

For some time in the 2010s and early 2020s it was a music venue, and is known as where Fat White Family rehearsed, performed, and put on their own night, Slide-In. The band Shame also started to rehearse there shortly after.

In November 2014 photos emerged of the then landlord dressed in blackface at a party there, with another guest wearing a Ku Klux Klan costume and performing a Nazi salute, causing public outrage that was reported in the national press.

In September 2015 that landlord gave up the lease and it closed. Soon after it reopened under different management as a gastropub focusing on local ales and food, though still with live music and club nights.

As of January 2024 it closed its doors to the public and is currently boarded up.
