= Black Country, New Road discography =

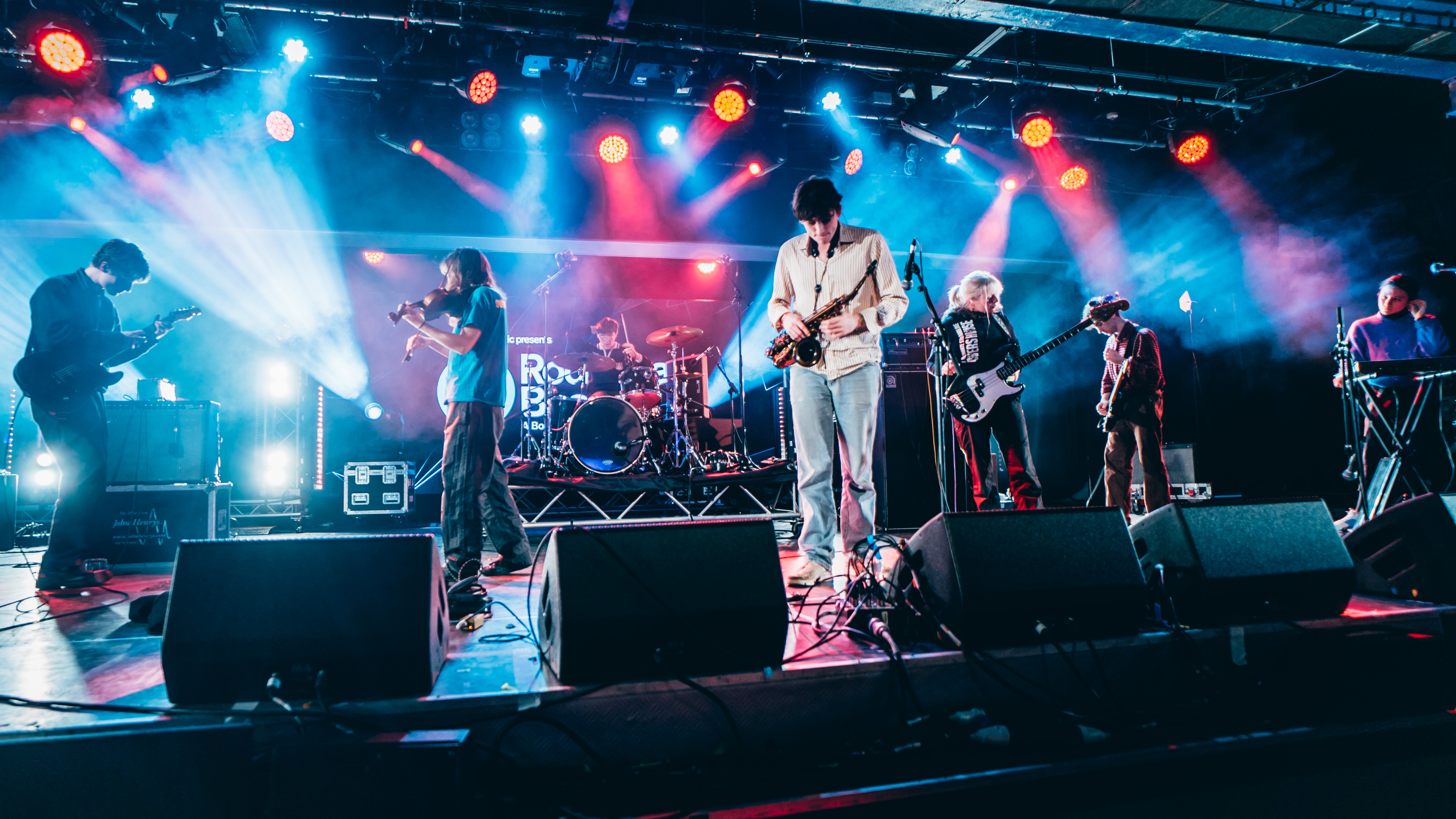
- Black Country, New Road performing in January 2020
- Studio albums: 3
- EPs: 2
- Live albums: 1
- Singles: 13
- Music videos: 6

The discography of Black Country, New Road, an English experimental rock group, consists of three studio albums, one live album, two extended plays, thirteen singles, and six music videos. The band was formed in 2018 in Cambridge by Tyler Hyde, Lewis Evans, Georgia Ellery, May Kershaw, Charlie Wayne, and Isaac Wood. Within the South London music scene, they often performed at the Brixton Windmill venue and quickly gained attention for their live shows and early recordings. Their discography has achieved critical and commercial success, particularly in the United Kingdom.

Black Country, New Road released their debut single, "Athens, France", in January 2019 through the independent label Speedy Wunderground. In early 2019, Luke Mark joined Black Country, New Road as a second guitarist, expanding the band to seven members. Later that year, they issued a second single, "Sunglasses". Both tracks quickly attracted critical attention for their experimental style and eclectic blending of genres, contributing to the band's early cult following. Physical editions of the singles became sought after by collectors, with some reportedly resold for over £100. In October 2020, the band signed with the English record label Ninja Tune. On 5 February 2021, the band released their debut album, For the First Time. The album was met with critical acclaim and charted in many different countries, notably debuting at number four on the UK Albums Chart, and it became their first number-one release on the UK Independent Albums Chart.

Their second studio album, Ants from Up There, was released on 4 February 2022, just four days after Isaac Wood's departure. The album marked the band's highest commercial success, debuting at number three on the UK Albums Chart, and charting in more countries than their previous releases. Following this, the band released their first live album, Live at Bush Hall, recorded during three performances in December 2022, which showcased a new set of material written after Wood's departure. The album peaked at number 92 on the UK Albums Chart. Their third studio album, Forever Howlong, was released on 4 April 2025 to critical acclaim. It debuted at number three on the UK Albums Chart and number one on the UK Independent Albums Chart. The album also charted internationally, reaching number 16 in Germany, 22 in Australia, and 135 on the United States Billboard 200, marking their first appearance on that chart.

== Albums ==
=== Studio albums ===
List of studio albums, with selected details and chart positions
Title	Details	Peak chart positions												Certifications
Title	Details	UK	UK Indie	AUS	AUT	BEL (FL)	GER	IRE	NLD	NZ	SWI	US	US Rock	Certifications
For the First Time	Released: 5 February 2021; Label: Ninja Tune; Format: LP, CD, cassette, digital	4	1	94	60	52	44	—	—	—	—	— (Note: For the First Time did not enter the Billboard 200, but it peaked at number 50 on the Top Album Sales chart.)	—	
Ants from Up There	Released: 4 February 2022; Label: Ninja Tune; Format: LP, CD, cassette, digital	3	2	6	29	11	10	18	9	17	25	— (Note: Ants from Up There did not enter the Billboard 200, but it peaked at number 12 on the Top Album Sales chart.)	38	BPI: Silver
Forever Howlong	Released: 4 April 2025; Label: Ninja Tune; Format: LP, CD, cassette, digital	3	1	22	32	69	16	38	53	31	—	135	23	
"—" denotes releases that did not chart.														

=== Live albums ===
List of live albums, with selected details
Title	Details	Peak chart positions			
Title	Details	UK	UK Indie	AUS Dig.	SCO
Live at Bush Hall	Released: 20 February 2023; Label: Ninja Tune; Format: LP, CD, digital	92	10	24	12

== Extended plays ==
Title	Details	Peak chart positions
Title	Details	UK Sales
Never Again	Released: 2021; Label: Ninja Tune; Released via: Rough Trade Records; Format: 12"	77
Never Again Pt. 2	Released: 2022; Label: Ninja Tune; Released via: Rough Trade Records; Format: 12"	21

== Singles ==
List of singles, showing year released and album name
Title	Year	Album
"Athen's, France"	2019	For the First Time
"Sunglasses"	2019	For the First Time
"Science Fair"	2020	For the First Time
"Track X"	2021	For the First Time
"Track X (The Guest)"	2021	Non-album single
"Chaos Space Marine"	2021	Ants from Up There
"Bread Song"	2021	Ants from Up There
"Concorde"	2021	Ants from Up There
"Snow Globes"	2022	Ants from Up There
"Besties"	2025	Forever Howlong
"Happy Birthday"	2025	Forever Howlong
"For the Cold Country"	2025	Forever Howlong
"Strangers"	2026	Help(2)

== Music videos ==
List of music videos, showing year released and director
Title	Year	Album	Director(s)
"Science Fair"	2020	For the First Time	Bart Price
"Track X"	2021	For the First Time	Bart Price
"Bread Song" (Live from Another World)	2021	Ants from Up There	Simon Lane
"Concorde"	2022	Ants from Up There	Maxim Kelly
"Besties"	2025	Forever Howlong	Rianne White
"Happy Birthday"	2025	Forever Howlong	Lesley-Anne Rose
