= Georgia Ellery =

English violinist and singer (born 1997)

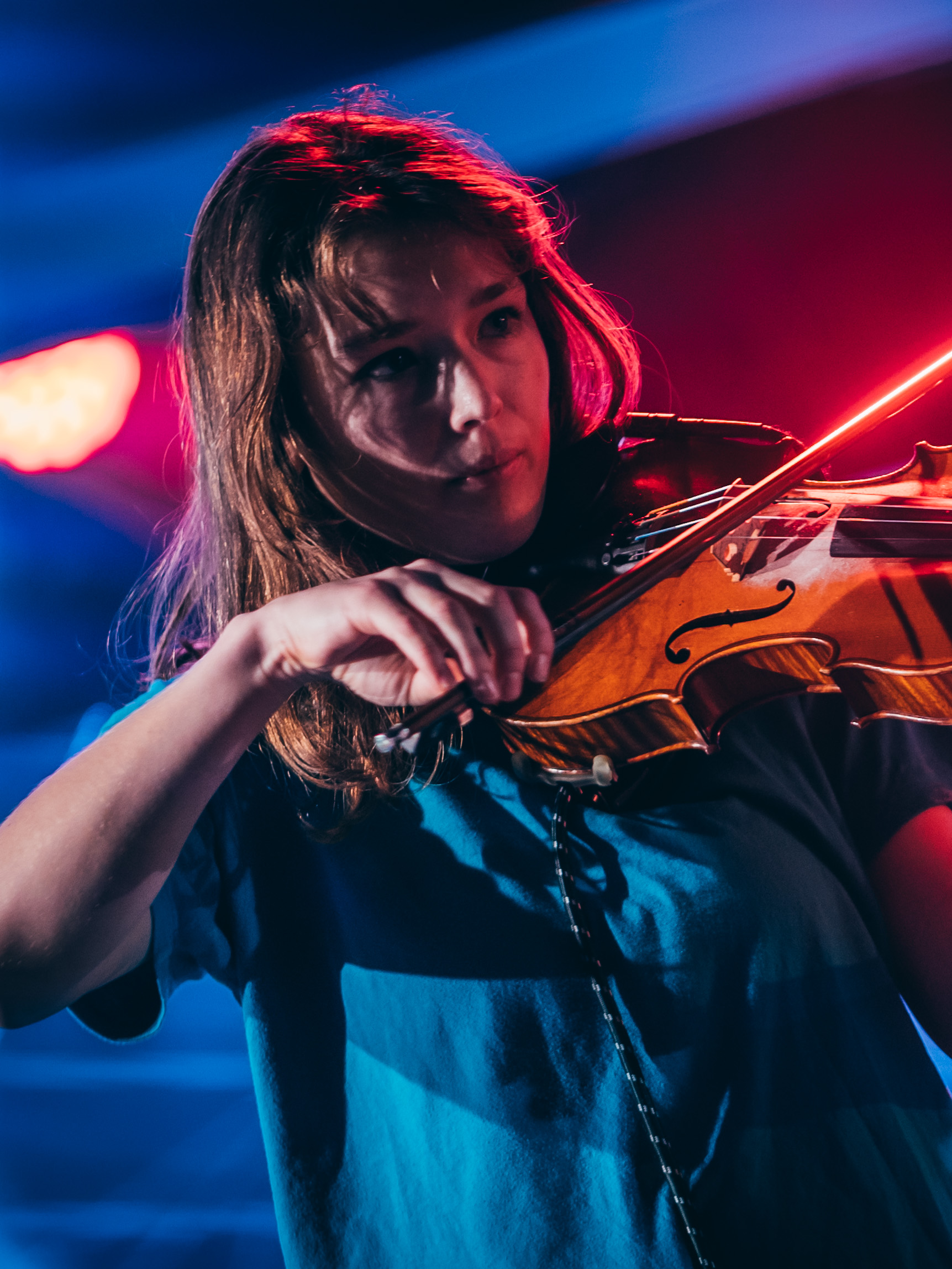
- Ellery performing with Black Country, New Road in 2020
- Born: 1997 (age 28–29); Cornwall, England
- Education: Guildhall School of Music and Drama
- Musical career
- Genres: Experimental pop; art pop; art rock; chamber pop; progressive folk; post-punk; post rock
- Instruments: Violin; vocals; guitar
- Member of: Black Country, New Road; Jockstrap
- Formerly of: Nervous Conditions

Georgia Ellery (born 1997) is an English violinist and singer. She is one half of the experimental pop duo Jockstrap. She also plays violin and is a vocalist in the rock band Black Country, New Road.

== Life and career ==
Georgia Ellery was born in Cornwall, England in 1997. Her mother is a music therapist and encouraged Ellery to begin violin lessons at age 5. She has a brother. She studied jazz violin at the Guildhall School of Music and Drama in London, where she met future Jockstrap bandmate Taylor Skye.

In 2014, Ellery and fellow future Black Country, New Road bandmates Tyler Hyde, Lewis Evans, May Kershaw, Charlie Wayne, and Isaac Wood, along with Connor Browne and Jonny Pyke, formed the band Nervous Conditions. Nervous Conditions disbanded in 2018 after Browne was accused by multiple parties of sexual assault. Ellery, along with Hyde, Evans, Kershaw, Wayne, and Wood, formed Black Country, New Road shortly after, with Ellery playing violin and providing background vocals.

In 2019, Ellery played the role of Katie Leigh in the film Bait.

In 2022, Black Country, New Road lead vocalist Isaac Wood announced he was leaving the band. Following this, Ellery began to split lead vocal duties with Hyde, Evans, and Kershaw.

== Artistry ==
Ellery grew up listening to romantic composers such as Tchaikovsky and Brahms, and at 14 began listening to house music.

Ellery has listed musicians Elton John, Joni Mitchell, and Paul Simon, as well as photographer Robert Mapplethorpe, as influences on her songwriting. She has said her dream collaborator is Sunn O))).

== Personal life ==
Ellery lives in London and is bisexual.

== Discography ==
=== Jockstrap ===
- I Love You Jennifer B (2022)

=== Black Country, New Road ===
- For the First Time (2021)
- Ants from Up There (2022)
- Forever Howlong (2025)
