= Chaos Space Marine (song) =

Single by Black Country, New Road

from the album Ants from Up There
- Released: 12 October 2021
- Genre: Art rock; progressive pop; baroque pop
- Length: 3:36
- Label: Ninja Tune
- Producer: Sergio Maschetzko

Black Country, New Road singles chronology
"Track X" (2021)	"Chaos Space Marine" (2021)	"Bread Song" (2021)

"Chaos Space Marine" is a song by the English band Black Country, New Road, released as the lead single from their studio album Ants from Up There (2022). According to Isaac Wood, the song's creation "was a really fast, whimsical approach – like throwing all the shit at the wall and just letting everything stick". He also admits the band "threw every idea anyone had".

== Composition ==
With its name referencing the eponymous miniatures from the Warhammer 40,000 franchise, the track begins in a frantic, engaging, and fun manner, with a catchy melody that reappears later in the track. The opening was compared to the song "Re-Make/Re-Model" by the band Roxy Music. Following this, soft but anticipatory staccato piano chords emerge, progressing into a grand and energetic instrumental.

After the instrumental moment, vocalist Isaac Wood's restrained vocals ascend with the music into a hoarse roar, akin to a rock opera introduction. With piano accompaniment from May Kershaw, he contemplates leaving London behind for New York City and the high seas, with quotations from the Smiths ("though England is mine") and the Bible ("love thy neighbour") interspersed. The lyrics detail the story of a surrealist character known as the "Chaos Space Marine" from Warhammer 40,000. They also combine grand imagery with introspective anxiety that references England and pop culture figures such as Billie Eilish.

The song's melody draws inspiration from glam rock, as well as styles of classical music and jazz. The track at times resembles the sound of the band Arcade Fire. The song's chorus was compared to the album The Wall (1979) by Pink Floyd, specifically the emphatic "yeahhhhs". Following this, the band performs a synchronised leg kick after the rhythmic pause in the first chorus. The repetition of riffs at a certain point creates tension and anticipation for something grand to break the cycle. The track then culminates with soft backing vocals from Tyler Hyde and Kershaw, a comforting piano cadence from Kershaw, and a melancholic saxophone sigh as Lewis Evans slows the tempo.

== Release ==
The song was released on 12 October 2021, as the lead single from the studio album Ants from Up There. It was released alongside the album's announcement, which was later released on 4 February 2022. Wood described it as "the best song [they had] ever written".

=== Reception ===
"Chaos Space Marine" received mixed to positive reviews. Matthew Prudham of The Indiependent stated the track is so masterfully planned that, despite its musical surprises, it works very well. Aran Grover of Exposé wrote that "BCNR with this single present a perhaps more refined sound than their debut".

Dafydd Jenkins of Loud and Quiet called "Chaos Space Marine" a low point on the album, a victim of the album's overblown approach. Writing for Rolling Stone, Niall Doherty had a negative opinion of "Chaos Space Marine", comparing it to "a high school band trying to show off for their new cool teacher".

== Personnel ==
Credits adapted from Tidal.

=== Musicians ===
- Isaac Wood – vocals, guitar
- Georgia Ellery – violin
- Lewis Evans – saxophone
- May Kershaw – piano, backing vocals
- Tyler Hyde – bass, backing vocals
- Charlie Wayne – drums
- Tony Fagg – banjo

=== Production ===
- Sergio Maschetzko – production, songwriting
- Christian Wright – audio engineering
- David Granshaw, Sergio Maschetzko – mixing
- Just Isn't Music – music publishing
