= Bush Hall =

London music venue and former dance hall

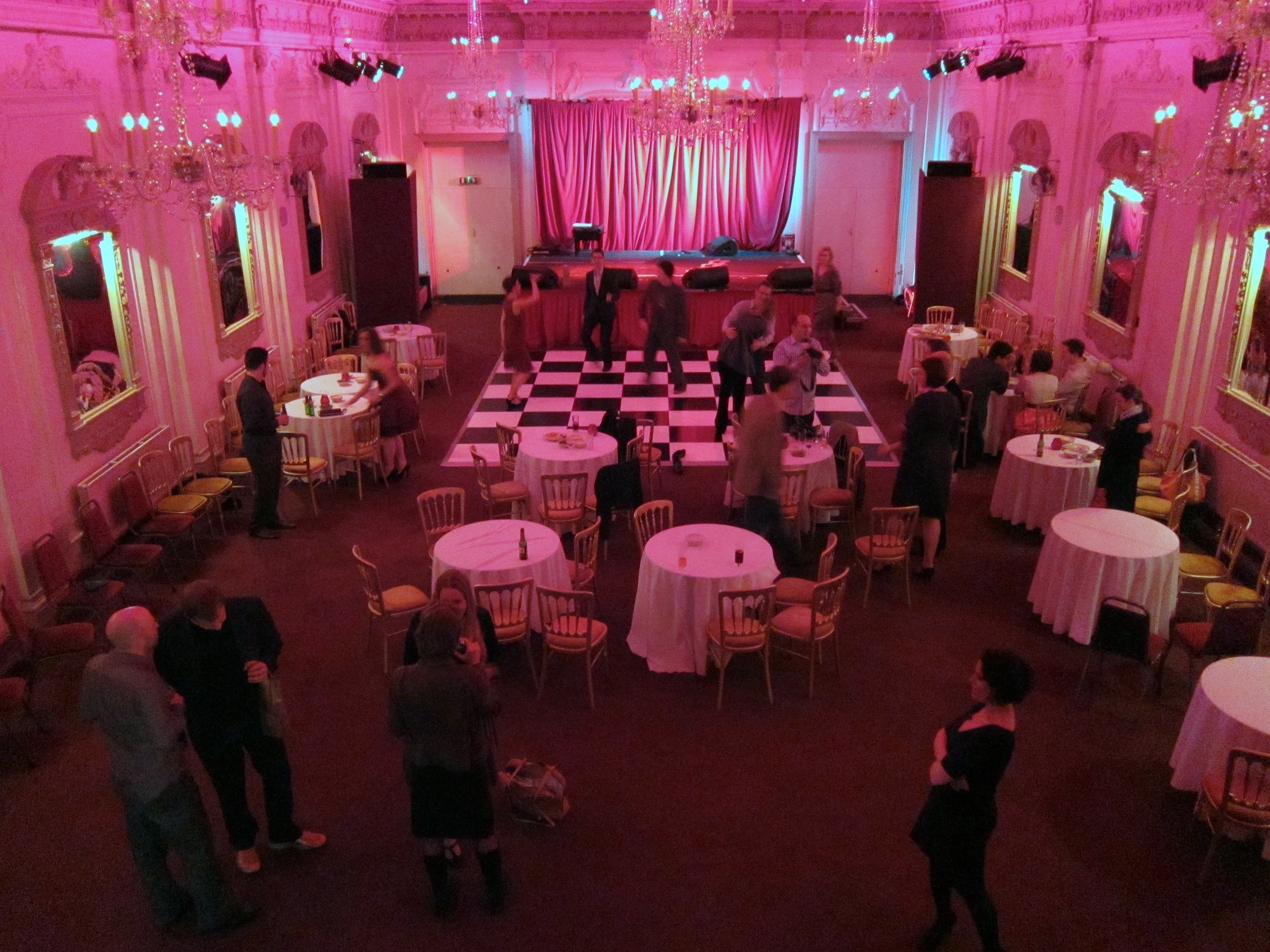
- Bush Hall in 2010
- Interactive map of Bush Hall
- Location: 310 Uxbridge Road, Shepherd's Bush
- Coordinates: 51°30′23″N 0°13′54″W
- Owner: Charlie Raworth and Emma Hutchinson
- Capacity: 400

Construction
- Built: 1904

Website
- www.bushhallmusic.co.uk

Bush Hall is a music venue in Shepherd's Bush, London.

It was built in 1904 as a dance hall. It was used as a soup kitchen during World War II, as a bingo hall and rehearsal stage in the late 1950s and early 1960s, and finally as a snooker and social club in the 1980s and 1990s. In 2001, it was restored as a music hall by its present owners, Charlie Raworth and Emma Hutchinson. It has a capacity of 400.

English post-rock band Black Country, New Road who recorded their album Live at Bush Hall there in 2022.
