= Ugly (UK band) =

British art rock band

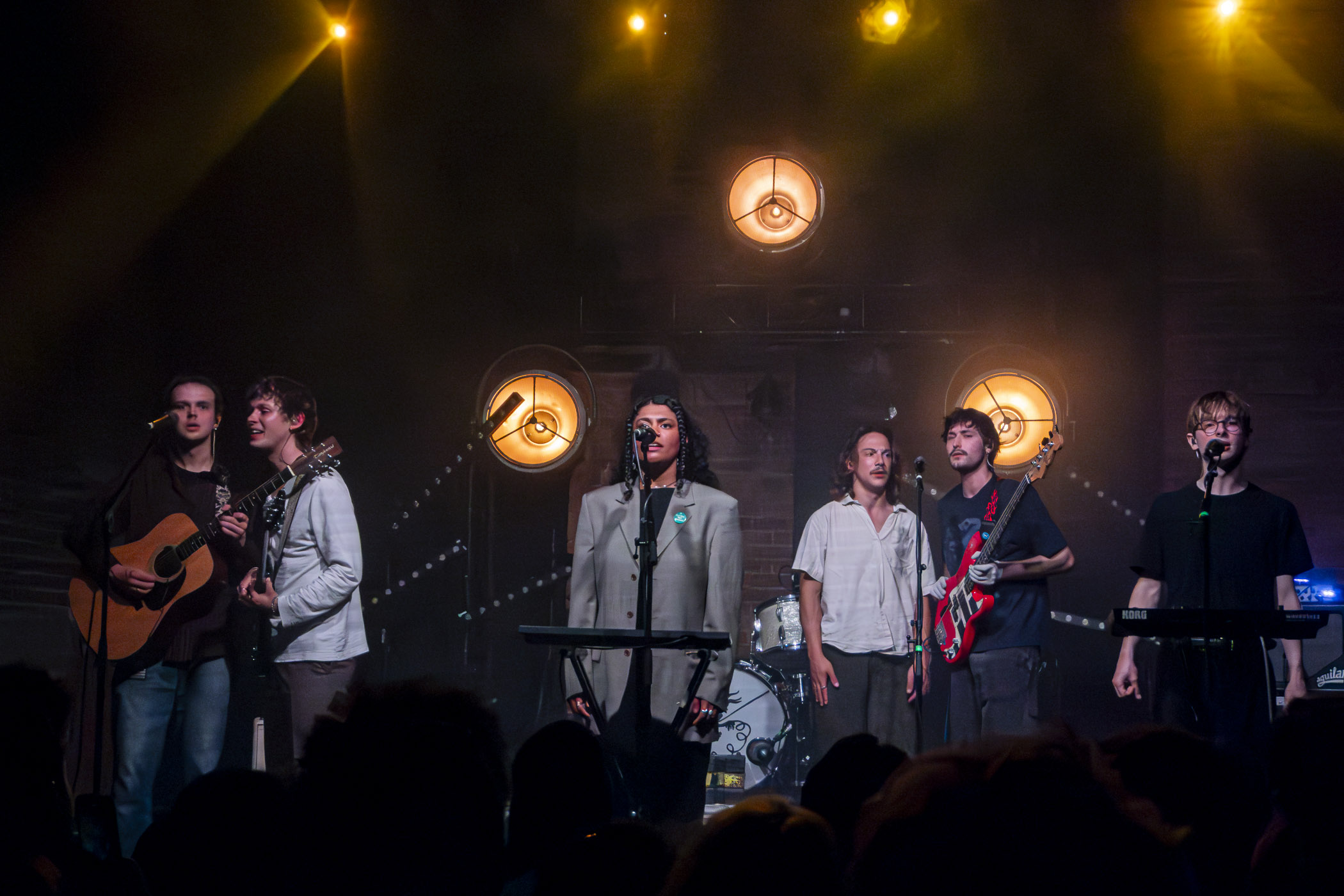
- Ugly at Village Underground in London in 2025

Background information
- Also known as: Ugly (UK)
- Origin: Cambridge, UK
- Genres: art rock; post rock
- Years active: 2016–present
- Members: Samuel Goater; Harrison Jones; Tom Lane; Harry Shapiro; Jasmine Miller-Sauchella; Theo Guttenplan
- Past members: Charlie Wayne; Brodie Weir
- Website: uglyofficialuk.com

Ugly is a London-based six-piece British art rock band from Cambridge formed in 2016. The group has performed with and been likened to Black Country, New Road and Lime Garden. Unlike contemporaries, Ugly boasts folk music instrumentation and rich and dramatic vocal harmonies. Their music has been described as art rock, post rock and experimental, while musical influences include choral music and music of the '60s and '70s. Their sound has also been compared to Mars Volta, Everything Everything and Adult Jazz.

== History ==
Original band members included guitarists Samuel Goater and Harrison Jones, drummer Charlie Wayne and bassist Brodie Weir, who met each other in college in Cambridge.

The band underwent a time of self-reflection in 2022, and changed their sound from a grittier, post-rock feel to an ensemble and vocal driven approach.

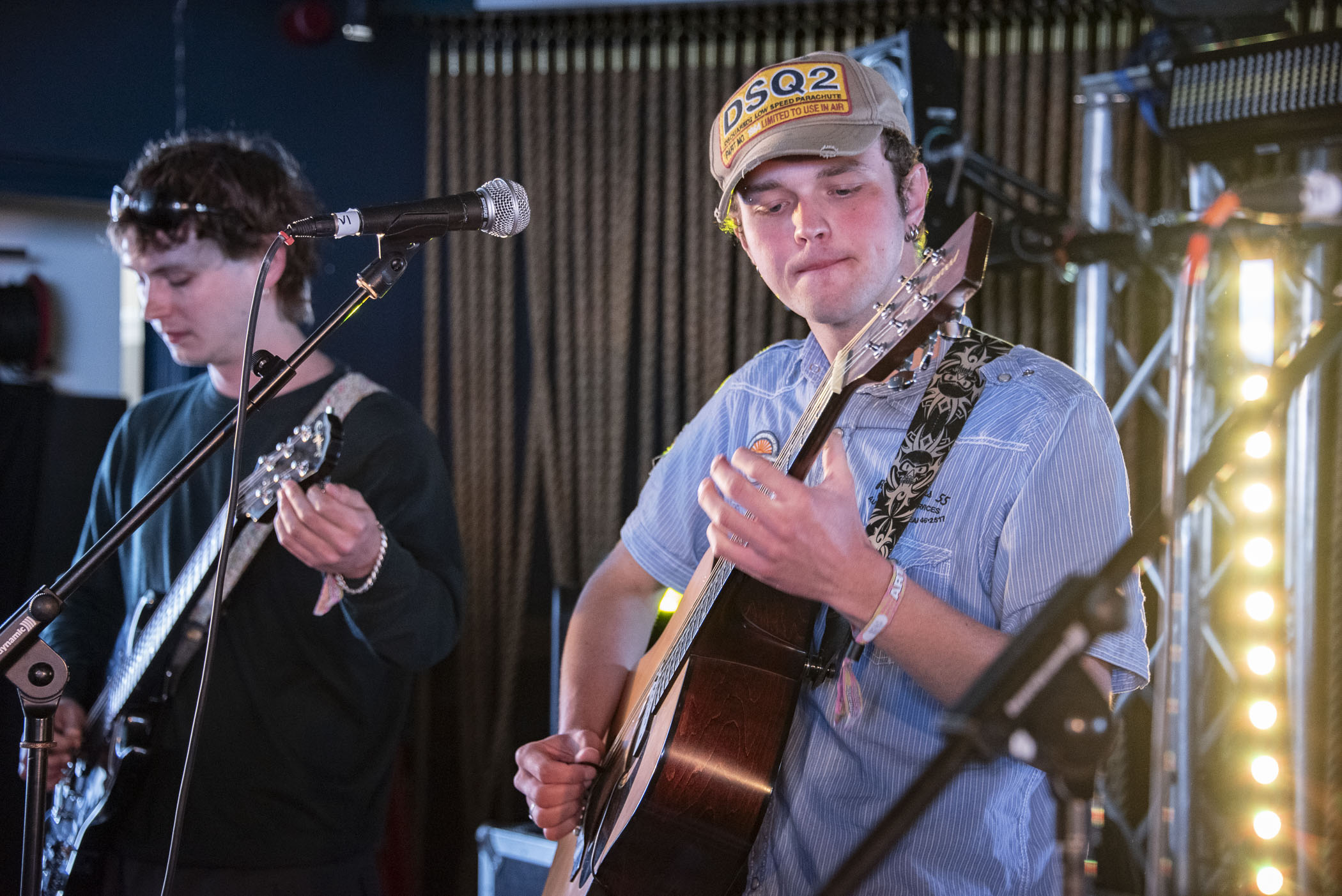
Ugly in May 2025 at The Great Escape Brighton, UK

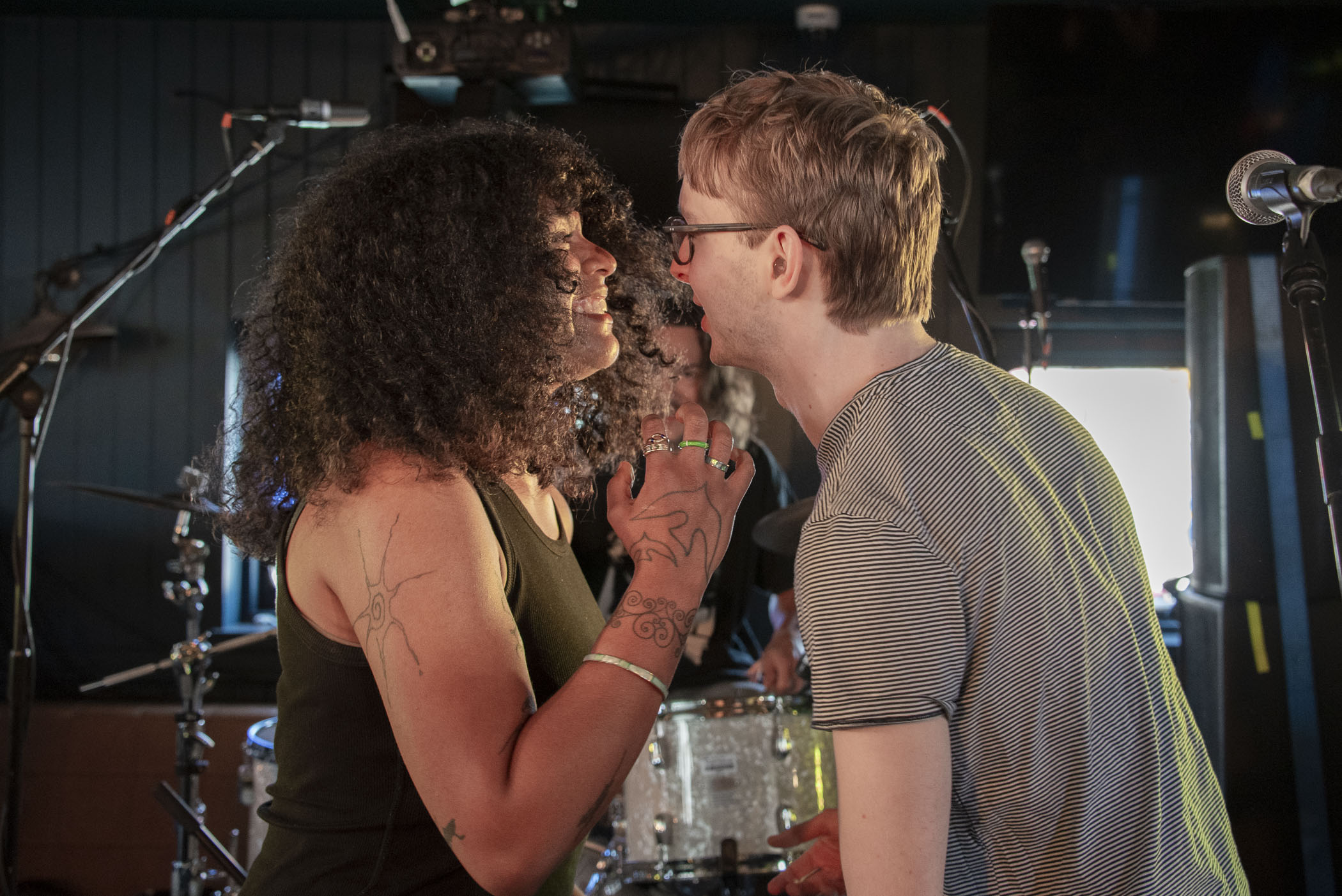
Ugly in May 2025 at The Great Escape Brighton, UK

== Members ==
- Samuel Goater – guitar, acoustic guitar, vocals
- Harrison Jones – guitar
- Tom Lane - synth, vocals
- Harry Shapiro – bass, vocals
- Jasmine Miller-Sauchella – keys, vocals
- Theo Guttenplan – drums

== Discography ==
- Archive: 2017-2019 (2019)
- Twice Around the Sun (2024)
- The South Facade (2026)
