= Live at Bush Hall =

Video by Black Country, New Road
- Released: Video: 20 February 2023; Album: 24 March 2023
- Recorded: 15–16 December 2022
- Venue: Bush Hall, London
- Length: 46:55
- Label: Ninja Tune
- Director: Greg Barnes

Black Country, New Road chronology
Ants from Up There (2022)	Live at Bush Hall (2023)	Forever Howlong (2025)

Live at Bush Hall is a concert film and live album by the British rock band Black Country, New Road released on 20 February 2023 through YouTube. It was the first official release following Ants from Up There and the departure of Isaac Wood, the band's vocalist, and consists of recordings from previously unreleased music performed live at Bush Hall, London, over the period of 15–16 December 2022.

The live album of the performance was released on 24 March 2023 through Ninja Tune.

== Background and performance ==
On 31 January 2022, four days prior to the release of Ants From Up There, Black Country, New Road's vocalist, Isaac Wood announced that he was departing the band due to mental health issues. This resulted in the band cancelling their upcoming tour in North America and beginning work on new music they could perform without him. They continued to perform gigs as they felt they had to "keep momentum", or it would have "felt like [they] were quitting music". Over the following months, the band wrote new music. The band did not intend on creating a new full-length album at the time, so the tracks were written with the specific intent to be performed live. Lewis Evans, who was now acting as one of the band's vocalists alongside being the saxophonist, said that they wanted to release a live performance to act as a "little time capsule of these eight months that we’ve had playing these songs on the road". Luke Mark, the guitarist, wanted to avoid the problems he noticed in previous live performances. Specifically, he wanted to avoid the recording appearing disingenuous by making the cuts between performances obvious, rather than attempting to disguise them.

To accomplish this, the band constructed a unique theme for each of the three live sessions, with a backstory for each: "When The Whistle Thins", which was set at a gathering of farmers; "I Ain't Alfredo No Ghosts", set in a pizza restaurant where the chef encounters a poltergeist; and "The Taming Of The School", which had a 1980s prom night theme. Combined, this resulted in obvious cuts between songs, showing that they "didn't want to just do this completely perfect thing" according to Evans. According to drummer Charlie Wayne, they wanted the "focal point to be this film. We've put a lot of effort into making it feel like you're watching a live gig. It's not an album in our eyes, it's a live performance".

== Release ==
Black Country, New Road posted a short teaser on their social media for something "coming soon", scheduled for release on 20 February. It was then announced to be a recording of their performances at Bush Hall, London, premiering on YouTube. There was also a special screening the same night of the release at the Institute of Contemporary Arts.

Official digital and physical releases of the performance occurred on 24 March 2023 through Ninja Tune.

== Critical reception ==
Professional ratings
Aggregate scores
Source	Rating
Metacritic	83/100
Review scores
Source	Rating
AllMusic	4/5 stars
Far Out	2.5/5 stars
The Guardian	5/5 stars
NME	4/5 stars
Pitchfork	7.6/10

After the official digital release of the performance, the album received positive reviews from critics. At Metacritic, the album has received an average score of 83, based on 5 reviews.

Concluding the review for AllMusic, Timothy Monger claimed that, "Black Country, New Road remain an unpredictable and surprisingly resilient unit. Unique circumstances that would have sunk many a band -- loss of leadership, the pressures of newfound critical acclaim -- simply galvanized them into writing a new chapter in their story." Reviewing the album for The Guardian, Ben Beaumont-Thomas declared that, "Releasing this material as a live album is a virtue – the audience’s roar after the absurdly pretty Turbines/Pigs has a thrilling note of disbelief." At NME, Thomas Smith stated that, "The band dub these 2022 sets as works-in-progress, and say that none of its members are precious about the songs, a problem that thankfully doesn’t bely this release. You sense even better is to come. ‘Live At Bush Hall’, then, offers a remarkable snapshot of a band in transition, one willing to push on and not let circumstances stand in the way of what they love doing most."

Some critics did provide a more divided perspective of the album. Stuart Berman from Pitchfork opined that, "Notwithstanding the occasional bit of stage banter that makes no sense without the film (“Happy prom night!”), Live at Bush Hall is as cohesive a statement as any other record in the band's discography." Amy Ferrier was more critical in a review for Far Out by calling it, "a strange mix of tracks that moves between almost parodic intimations of themselves and truly incredible, affecting pieces."

== Track listing ==
All tracks are written by Charlie Wayne, Georgia Ellery, Lewis Evans, Luke Mark, May Kershaw, and Tyler Hyde.

Live at Bush Hall track listing
No.	Title	Lead vocals	Length
1.	"Up Song"	Hyde	4:20
2.	"The Boy"	Kershaw	6:16
3.	"I Won't Always Love You"	Hyde	4:10
4.	"Across the Pond Friend"	Evans	3:45
5.	"Laughing Song"	Hyde	5:33
6.	"The Wrong Trousers"	Evans	4:06
7.	"Turbines/Pigs"	Kershaw	9:46
8.	"Dancers"	Hyde	5:04
9.	"Up Song (Reprise)"	Hyde	3:55
Total length:			46:55

== Personnel ==
=== Black Country, New Road ===
- Charlie Wayne – drums, backing vocals
- Georgia Ellery – violin, backing vocals
- Lewis Evans – saxophone, flute, vocals (4, 6)
- Luke Mark – guitar, backing vocals
- May Kershaw – piano, accordion, vocals (2, 7)
- Tyler Hyde – bass, vocals (1, 3, 5, 8, 9)

=== Technical ===
- Greg Barnes – directing, editing
- John Parish – mixing
- Oliver Baldwin – assistant mixer
- Jordan Hayward – recording, engineering
- Christian Wright – mastering

=== Filmography ===
- Jack Maddison – director of photography
- Rowan Biddiscombe – camera operator
- Stephan Knight – camera operator
- Emily McNey – camera assistant
- Sebastian Olmos – camera assistant
- Francis Albrecht – lighting design
- Kev Corry – editing
- Cheat Studio – colour grading
- Neil Goody – sound mixing

=== Additional footage ===
- Ginny Davies
- Maxwell Tait
- Claire Evans
- Tony Fagg
- Jack Shep
- Cameron Picton
- Lucas Lockeridge
- Mika Hyde
- Basil Tierney
- Luna Wang
- Josh Knox

=== Other ===
- Rosalind Murray – artwork
- Ginny Davies – show programmes
- India Hogan – show programmes

== Charts ==
Chart performance for Live at Bush Hall
Chart (2023)	Peak position
Australian Digital Albums (ARIA)	24
Australian Physical Albums (ARIA)	52
Scottish Albums (OCC)	12
UK Albums (OCC)	92
UK Independent Albums (OCC)	10
