= Forever Howlong =

Studio album by Black Country, New Road
- Released: 4 April 2025
- Recorded: 2024
- Studios: Angelic, Halse
- Genres: Baroque pop; progressive folk; indie rock; alternative rock
- Length: 52:10 (Standard); 56:44 (Japanese)
- Label: Ninja Tune
- Producer: James Ford

Black Country, New Road chronology
Live at Bush Hall (2023)	Forever Howlong (2025)

Singles from Forever Howlong
- 1. "Besties" Released: 30 January 2025; 2. "Happy Birthday" Released: 3 March 2025; 3. "For the Cold Country" Released: 26 March 2025

Forever Howlong is the third studio album by the British rock band Black Country, New Road, released on 4 April 2025 via Ninja Tune. It is their first studio album after the departure of lead vocalist Isaac Wood, with vocal and principal songwriting duties being taken over by members Tyler Hyde, Georgia Ellery, and May Kershaw. It serves as a follow-up to their critically acclaimed second album, Ants from Up There (2022).

Work on the album began without a clear direction before the band settled on a more cohesive sound. The album was produced by James Ford and saw band members experimenting with new instruments, such as recorders.

The opening track "Besties" was released as a lead single in promotion of the album, followed by "Happy Birthday", and finally "For the Cold Country" before its release. The album was teased with a series of billboards. The album was released to critical acclaim, with critics describing the album as more accessible and uplifting in contrast to their previous albums. A tour in support of the album began on 13 May and concluded on 31 October 2025.

== Background ==
Five days before the release of Ants from Up There (2022), frontman Isaac Wood announced his departure from the band. Wood cited his discomfort from writing and performing songs, but stated he was still on good terms with the members of Black Country, New Road. The band refused to play their old material live, feeling that playing it would have been "strange" and "[in]appropriate", and stating it "[wasn't] even an option". To make up for the departure and to fulfill their tour dates, the band rapidly wrote and developed songs to perform live, with all members making contributions. These live tracks were compiled as a part of Live at Bush Hall (2023), which featured a notable shift in lyrics focusing on friendship rather than romance.

== Music ==
=== Production ===
After the band had undergone a reformation and lineup change, Forever Howlong was conceived without an initial musical aesthetic. The band gradually developed songs for a number of years, keeping the memorability of playing them live in mind, and focusing on more sentimental stylings. The band viewed Live at Bush Hall as a necessary stepping stone, but one that lacked longevity. In an interview, Hyde quipped that "I just didn't want to hang out with those songs anymore".

Vocal performances across Forever Howlong were taken up by Tyler Hyde, Georgia Ellery, and May Kershaw. Ellery described the process in a Pitchfork interview as a "healthy competition". Hyde noted the diversity in the three's backgrounds, stating it displayed "a pretty wide spectrum of womanhood". The album was produced by James Ford in an three week period, with Ford working from 10am to 2am daily. Band member Lewis Evans described the new style of lyrics as containing a "pop mentality" which is "catchy and likeable but have a deep-set weirdness". Hyde said that while there are many "tongue-in-cheek moments" in the album, there was "darkness within the album as well".

The band experimented with new instruments on the album, with members especially learning the recorder to accompany Kershaw's piano compositions. Ellery, whose violin was crushed due to a touring accident before the recording, had added the mandolin to the record and Kershaw experimented with the harpsichord in some of the singles.

=== Composition and lyrics ===
Forever Howlong has been described as alternative rock, indie rock, folk, progressive rock and baroque pop. The album's lead single and opener "Besties" discusses themes of friendship and unrequited love. Described by Rolling Stone UK's Will Richards as a "sprightly ode to female friendship", it contains a backing track made up of recorders. The band chose the song as the album's opener because of its harpsichord intro, and because they wanted to choose "something loud, something that hits". "The Big Spin" was one of the last tracks produced for the album, according to Kershaw. She also stated the song explores themes of emotional attachment to nature, particularly plants and trees, and how their condition affects people. Critic Sophie Flint Vázquez called the song's instrumental "delightfully whimsical". "Socks" addresses the feeling of emotional exhaustion and anxiety in response to the constant uncertainty caused by the news. Band member Charlie Wayne has said that it was difficult to write the drums for the song.

"Two Horses"
"Two Horses" was the first track written by Georgia Ellery for Black Country, New Road. It has been described by critics as country-style song about a solo traveller and the death of her horses.

"Salem Sisters" contains a piano-pop backing track, with lyrics that draw a comparison between the difficulty of connecting at a summer barbecue and the experience of burning at the stake, containing a section where the tempo changes according to each line of the vocals. The song was originally called "24/7", and originally contained vocals from Evans before he decided he no longer wanted to sing on it. "Two Horses" was described by Matthew Kim of The Line of Best Fit as a "folksy, progressive" country song sung by Ellery. Its lyrics discuss a woman travelling with two horses, who meets a man at a bar who eventually betrays her and kills her horses. The song was the first written by Ellery for Black Country, New Road. "Mary" is the only song on the album to feature all three vocalists at once. Musically, Kyle Kohner of Exclaim! described it as a "60s folk-pop" song. According to Hyde, the song is set in an all-girls school. "Happy Birthday", the second single from the album, is made up of layered brass arrangements. The band aimed to make a few "positive rock bangers that would feel great to play" for the album; Hyde stated this was one of them.

"For the Cold Country", the album's last single, was called "a Medievalist saga" by Clash critic Cal Cashin that contained complex sections and elements of post-rock. Vázquez described its orchestral crescendo as "a feverish jam session caught on fire", while Richards compared the "squealing horns" of the outro to Ants from Up There. According to Kershaw, it took two years to write the track, and that it was made from a lot of trial and error. "Nancy Tries to Take the Night" was originally formed during the band's performances at Bush Hall, and was characterised by Richards as a "six-minute-plus epic". Its second-person lyrics explore the pressures of conforming to traditional expectations of female social respectability. "Forever Howlong" is a slow-building track made up of only vocals and a recorder choir. The track's lyrics discuss topics such as "beans, vitamin B, and microbiome pH". The closing track "Goodbye (Don't Tell Me)" features "twiddly guitar parts" and a Britpop-inspired chorus, according to Cashin. The song was regarded as quite old, and according to Ellery, it "probably would've been on Bush Hall if I'd had the time".

== Release ==
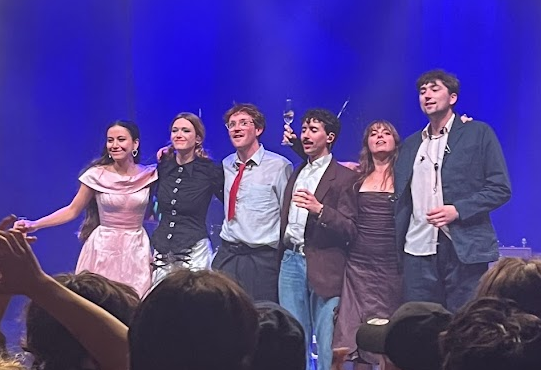
Black Country, New Road in 2023

Throughout December 2024 and January 2025, teasers for Forever Howlong would appear across Black Country, New Road's mailing list and social media pages. Billboards teasing the album were placed around London, which featured artwork from the album and a date of 4 April 2025. Three of the billboards included a red button that would illuminate a star when pressed.

The lead single, "Besties", was released on 30 January after being confirmed through a webpage shown after signing up for the band's mailing list. The song was accompanied by a music video directed by Rianne White. According to Evans, Ellery did not sing on any of the Live at Bush Hall songs, making her appearance on the studio version of "Besties" a notable debut. The band also announced a tour in support of the album, originally planned to start on 13 May in Chicago, and concluding on 31 October in London. The second single, "Happy Birthday", was released on 3 March, alongside a stop-motion animation music video directed by Lesley-Anne Rose. More UK tour dates were announced alongside the single, with the tour now commencing on 7 April in Stockport. The third and final single, "For the Cold Country", was released on 26 March 2025.

Forever Howlong was released on 4 April 2025 through Ninja Tune on 2xLP, CD and cassette. Multiple variants of the vinyl release were made available, such as a signed white label and releases with alternate artwork. Variants of both the vinyl and cassette releases dubbed the "Collector's Edition" feature an alternate tracklist. Later tour dates would be announced for Australia and New Zealand, extending the tour to 4 March 2026.

A 12" record with four demos recorded in July 2024 titled Forever Howlong Demos: Live at the Cornish Bank was released though Rough Trade on 11 November 2025.

== Critical reception ==
Professional ratings
Aggregate scores
Source	Rating
AnyDecentMusic?	8.1/10
Metacritic	83/100
Review scores
Source	Rating
AllMusic	4.5/5 stars
Clash	9/10
DIY	5/5 stars
Exclaim!	8/10
The Guardian	4/5 stars
The Line of Best Fit	9/10
Mojo	4/5 stars
NME	4/5 stars
Pitchfork	7.5/10
Uncut	7/10

Forever Howlong has received acclaim from critics. At Metacritic, which assigns a weighted average rating out of 100 to reviews from mainstream critics, Forever Howlong received a rating of 83 out of 100 based on eighteen critic reviews, indicating "universal acclaim". Similarly, on AnyDecentMusic?, it received a rating of 8.1 out of 10, based on 24 reviews.

Reviewing the album for AllMusic, Timothy Monger claimed that it was, "Just as wily and unpredictable as anything they've done before, but with the added bonus of being delivered by three distinctive voices". Sophie Vázquez of DIY praised the album's distinctness and spontaneity and wrote that it is "the band's most uplifting project to date". Will Richards writing for Rolling Stone said that Forever Howlong was a "rich and considered album that bursts with life and creativity". Marc Abbott wrote that the album is "very nearly perfect" in Under the Radar and notes how it "melds" multiple genres together. Johnny Sharp wrote in Uncut that the "meandering melodic strands" though the album's breaking of convention "begin to stick" after repeat listens. Matthew Kim of The Line of Best Fit concluded that the band "never sounded this full before" on Forever Howlong, and said the album was "messy, incohesive, and purely, beautifully human". Zach Schonfeld of Pitchfork said that harmony played a key part in the album and called the band a "multi-headed beast" with an "overflowing creative spirit".

The Guardian critic Alexis Petridis wrote that the band "[struck] an intriguing balance between winsome imagery and darker themes" with the new tone that the album took, calling it "surprising, captivating and unique". Writing for Exclaim!, Kyle Kohner said that the "calm confidence" of the album would attract new fans, but possibly alienate long-time listeners. Kohner also called it "a familiar voice in a new room". Victoria Segal of Mojo compared the band's shift in tone and vocalists to the "Grandfather's Axe paradox" for older fans. She called the album "remarkably unified" and "gloriously intriguing". Donovan Livesey of MusicOMH wrote that the three vocalists produce "striking cohesion" and called the album "meticulously detailed" and "embraces accessibility without sacrificing the band's intricacy". Writing for Clash, Cal Cashin said it would take listeners a while to "get [their] head around Forever Howlong", but that it was incredibly rewarding. Casey Epstein-Gross of Paste said that while the album was not always consistent, it was still "undeniably special". Our Culture writer Konstantinos Pappis wrote that Forever Howlong "manages to paint the deepest conflicts over a lovely, delightful musical canvas", and referred to Black Country, New Road as a "resilient group".

== Track listing ==
All music is composed by Georgia Ellery, Lewis Evans, Tyler Hyde, May Kershaw, Luke Mark, and Charlie Wayne.

Forever Howlong track listing
No.	Title	Lyrics	Length
1.	"Besties"	Ellery	3:36
2.	"The Big Spin"	Kershaw	2:31
3.	"Socks"	Hyde	6:07
4.	"Salem Sisters"	Hyde; Wayne; Rachid Fakhre	3:10
5.	"Two Horses"	Ellery	6:26
6.	"Mary"	Hyde	4:06
7.	"Happy Birthday"	Hyde	4:06
8.	"For the Cold Country"	Kershaw	6:27
9.	"Nancy Tries to Take the Night"	Hyde	6:36
10.	"Forever Howlong"	Kershaw	4:48
11.	"Goodbye (Don't Tell Me)"	Ellery	4:17
Total length:			52:10

Japanese bonus track
No.	Title	Length
12.	"Forever Howlong" (live at the Cornish Bank, Falmouth)	4:34
Total length:		56:44

=== Notes ===
- Tracks 8 through to 11 are listed in reverse order on the Collector's Edition 2LP. "Forever Howlong" is additionally split into two separate tracks, with "Forever" on side C and "Howlong" on side D. The Collector's Edition cassette also contains the alternate tracklist, but does not split "Forever Howlong" into two tracks.

== Personnel ==
Credits adapted from the album's liner notes and Tidal.

=== Black Country, New Road ===
- Georgia Ellery – lead vocals (1, 5, 11), mandolin (1, 2, 4, 5, 7), violin (2, 3, 8–10), backing vocals (4, 6–8), tenor recorder (10), acoustic guitar (11)
- Lewis Evans – alto saxophone (1–5, 7, 9–11), flute (5–7, 9–11), tenor recorder (10), bass clarinet (10), clarinet (10)
- Tyler Hyde – bass (1–5, 7–11), backing vocals (1, 5, 8, 11), lead vocals (3–7, 9), piano (3), acoustic guitar (6, 7, 9), harmonium (9), recorder (10), clarinet (10)
- May Kershaw – harpsichord (1, 4, 8, 11), backing vocals (1, 4–7, 11), piano (2–5, 7–11), accordion (2, 8, 10), lead vocals (2, 8, 10)
- Luke Mark – acoustic guitar (1–3, 5–9, 11), electric guitar (1, 3, 4, 7–9, 11), lap steel guitar (2, 10, 11), tenor recorder (10)
- Charlie Wayne – drums (1–5, 7–9, 11), timpani (2, 4, 8), percussion (2, 4, 8), banjo (5, 6, 9, 10), tenor recorder (10)

=== Additional contributors ===
- James Ford – production
- Luke Gibbs – engineering
- Brodie Griffin – engineering assistance
- Cass Whiley-Morton – engineering assistance
- Nathan Boddy – mixing
- Matt Colton – mastering
- Jordan Kee – paintings
- Ginny Davies – creative direction, design
- Rachid Fakhre - writing on "Salem Sisters"

== Charts ==
Chart performance for Forever Howlong
Chart (2025)	Peak position
Australian Albums (ARIA)	22
Austrian Albums (Ö3 Austria)	32
Belgian Albums (Ultratop Flanders)	69
Dutch Albums (Album Top 100)	53
German Albums (Offizielle Top 100)	16
Irish Albums (Official Charts)	38
New Zealand Albums (RMNZ)	31
Portuguese Albums (AFP)	75
Scottish Albums (Official Charts)	3
UK Albums (Official Charts)	3
UK Independent Albums (Official Charts)	1
US Billboard 200	135
US Top Rock & Alternative Albums (Billboard)	29
