= Black Country, New Road =

English rock band

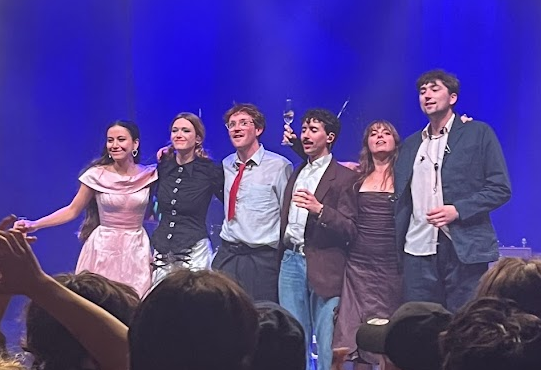
- Black Country, New Road in 2023. From left to right: Kershaw, Ellery, Wayne, Mark, Hyde, Evans

Background information
- Origin: Cambridge, England
- Genres: Art rock; chamber pop; progressive pop; post-punk (early); post-rock (early)
- Works: Discography
- Years active: 2018–present
- Labels: Ninja Tune; Speedy Wunderground
- Spinoffs: Black Midi, New Road
- Spinoff of: Nervous Conditions
- Members: Tyler Hyde; Lewis Evans; Georgia Ellery; May Kershaw; Charlie Wayne; Luke Mark
- Past members: Isaac Wood
- Website: blackcountrynewroad.com

Black Country, New Road (commonly abbreviated to BC,NR or BCNR) are an English rock band formed in Cambridge in 2018. Originally founded by Tyler Hyde (bass, vocals), Lewis Evans (vocals, flute, saxophone), Georgia Ellery (violin, vocals), May Kershaw (vocals, keyboards), Charlie Wayne (drums, backing vocals) and Isaac Wood (guitar, lead vocals), they added their then-seventh member, guitarist Luke Mark, in 2019.

The band gained initial attention through singles "Athens, France" and "Sunglasses" in 2019. Their debut album For the First Time, released in 2021, received widespread critical acclaim, was nominated for the Mercury Prize and reached No. 4 on the UK Albums Chart. Four days before the release of their 2022 second album Ants from Up There, Wood left the band, citing mental health struggles. The album received further critical acclaim and commercial success, debuting at No. 3 on the UK Albums Chart.

Following the departure of their lead vocalist Isaac Wood, the band immediately began work on new material, with Hyde, Ellery and Kershaw sharing lead vocal duties. After touring throughout 2022, the band released the concert film Live at Bush Hall, in February 2023, featuring several new compositions and songs that had been written since Wood's departure. In 2025, the band announced their third studio album Forever Howlong, which was released in April 2025.

== History ==
=== 2018–2021: Early career and For the First Time ===
In 2014, Tyler Hyde, Lewis Evans, Georgia Ellery, May Kershaw, Charlie Wayne, and Isaac Wood formed the East Cambridgeshire-based band Nervous Conditions, along with frontman Connor Browne and drummer Jonny Pyke. The group became known for their intense live performances and an eclectic sound. The band had recorded a full-length album in 2017, provisionally titled Zak's Anniversary; however, the album was subsequently shelved and remains officially unreleased. Following multiple allegations of sexual assault against Browne, Nervous Conditions split in early 2018. Browne issued a public apology, and the remaining members—unaware of the accusations at the time—soon formed a new project.

The group, without Browne and Pyke, reconvened soon after as Black Country, New Road in 2018. Formed by graduates of art and music schools, the six-piece was named after the eponymous road in the West Midlands in England, which Wood suggested after using Wikipedia's random article button. They performed several live shows at the Brixton Windmill venue and gained a small level of notoriety within the South London music scene. According to drummer Charlie Wayne, the band first performed with Black Midi in October 2017, before Black Country, New Road had officially formed. Although the new band shared much of Nervous Conditions' personnel, their musical direction was distinct from previous efforts.

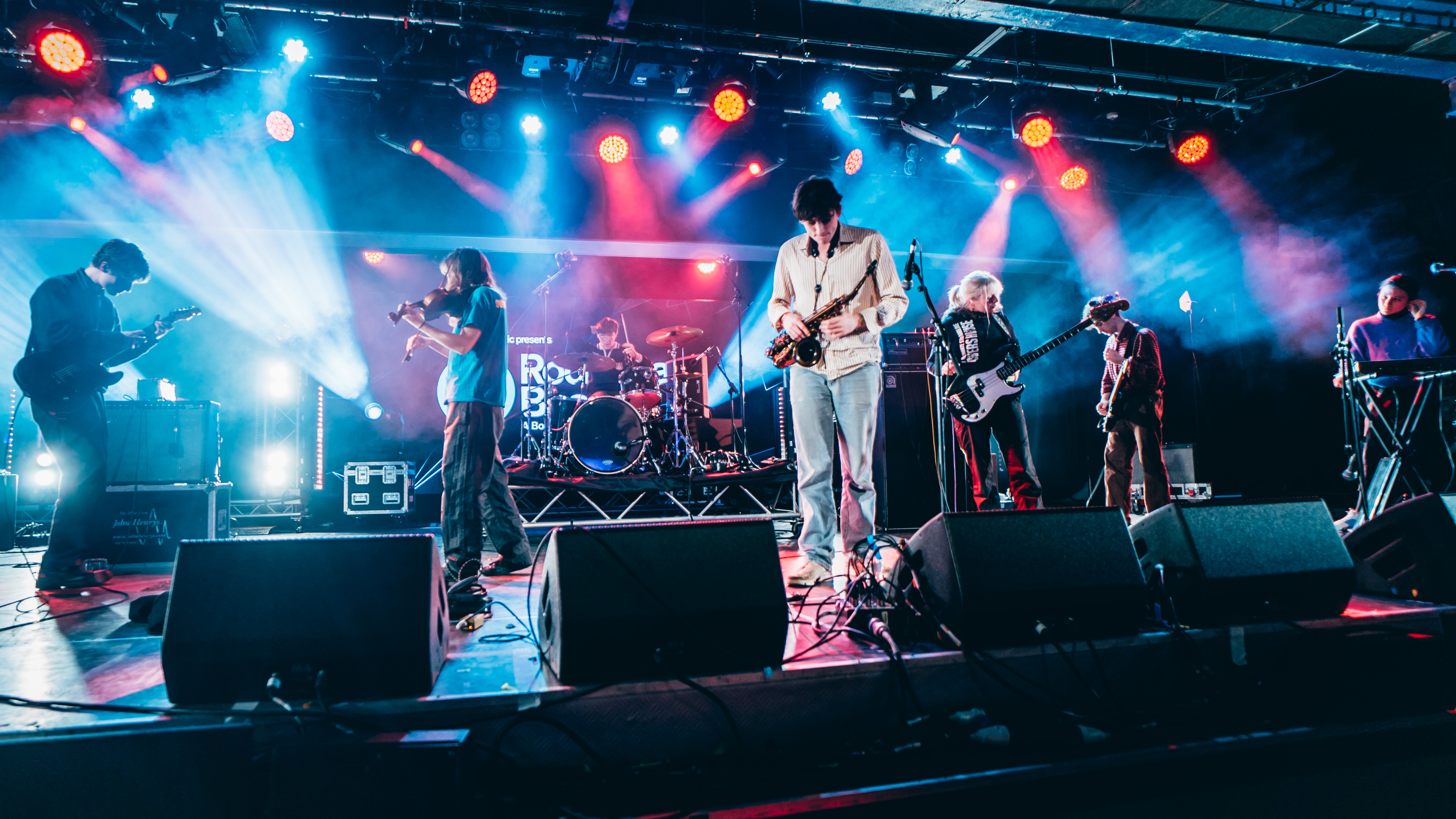
Black Country, New Road performing in January 2020

Their debut single, "Athens, France", was released on 18 January 2019 through the independent label Speedy Wunderground. In early 2019, Luke Mark joined Black Country, New Road as a second guitarist, expanding the band to a seven-piece lineup. This was followed with "Sunglasses", the band's second single, released on 26 July 2019. Both releases garnered attention from critics, for experimenting and blending of a variety of sounds, and developed a strong cult following, with physical copies reportedly being resold for over £100. Peter Helman of Stereogum noted the wide variety of genre influences on the track, describing it as a "wild ride", John Doran of The Quietus described the band, following the release of "Sunglasses", as "the best in the entire world".

In October 2020, Black Country, New Road signed to Ninja Tune. Later that month, on the 28th, the band announced their debut album, For the First Time, which was released on 5 February 2021 through Ninja Tune, alongside the release of its lead single, "Science Fair". On 11 January 2021, "Track X" was released as the second single from the album. The album was produced by Andy Savours and recorded in March 2020 during the early stages of the first UK COVID-19 lockdown. Following the album's release, it was met with critical acclaim and charted at number four on the UK Albums Chart, and it became their first number-one release on the UK Independent Albums Chart. Their growing popularity led to bookings at major music festivals such as Glastonbury, Primavera Sound, and South by Southwest in 2020, although these appearances were cancelled due to the COVID-19 pandemic.

=== 2021–2022: Ants from Up There and Isaac Wood's departure ===
On 12 October 2021, the band announced their second album Ants from Up There and released its lead single "Chaos Space Marine". Four of the album's songs were released as singles: "Chaos Space Marine", "Bread Song" on 2 November 2021, "Concorde" on 30 November 2021 and "Snow Globes" on 19 January 2022. On 3 November 2021, Black Country, New Road cancelled their upcoming European tour due to a band member's illness. The band released the Never Again EP on 3 December, a Rough Trade Records exclusive limited to 1,500 copies which features covers of songs by MGMT, ABBA and Adele.

On 31 January 2022, lead vocalist and guitarist Isaac Wood announced his sudden departure from the band four days before the release of Ants From Up There via social media, citing struggles with his mental health. This resulted in the cancelling of the band's planned first US tour. Black Country, New Road announced that the remaining six members had already begun to work on new music without Wood, as they were aware of Wood's planned exit long before it was announced. Out of respect for Wood, the band has chosen not to perform material from their first two albums live, but has expressed openness to his potential return in the future if he wishes to rejoin. Prior to Wood's departure, Hyde noted that the band's next release might not take the form of a studio album: "I know it's not going to be an album in its normal form. It would be cool to work with an orchestra; it would be cool to do a film score. These are just some of the ideas we're bouncing around at the moment". The idea of other band members taking on vocal duties had already been discussed. According to Hyde, the change "wasn't totally new". Since then, vocal duties within the band were shared among Hyde, Evans, Ellery, and Kershaw.

Ants from Up There was released on 4 February 2022 to universal critical acclaim. It also debuted at number three on the UK Albums Chart, the band's highest placement yet. The band was scheduled to begin a tour in support of the album in February, but the dates were cancelled following Wood's departure. A new tour, without Wood, commenced in May and ran through September. During this period, the band once again road-tested new material. A deluxe edition of the album was released on 10 June, featuring songs recorded live at the Queen Elizabeth Hall.

=== 2022–2024: Transition ===
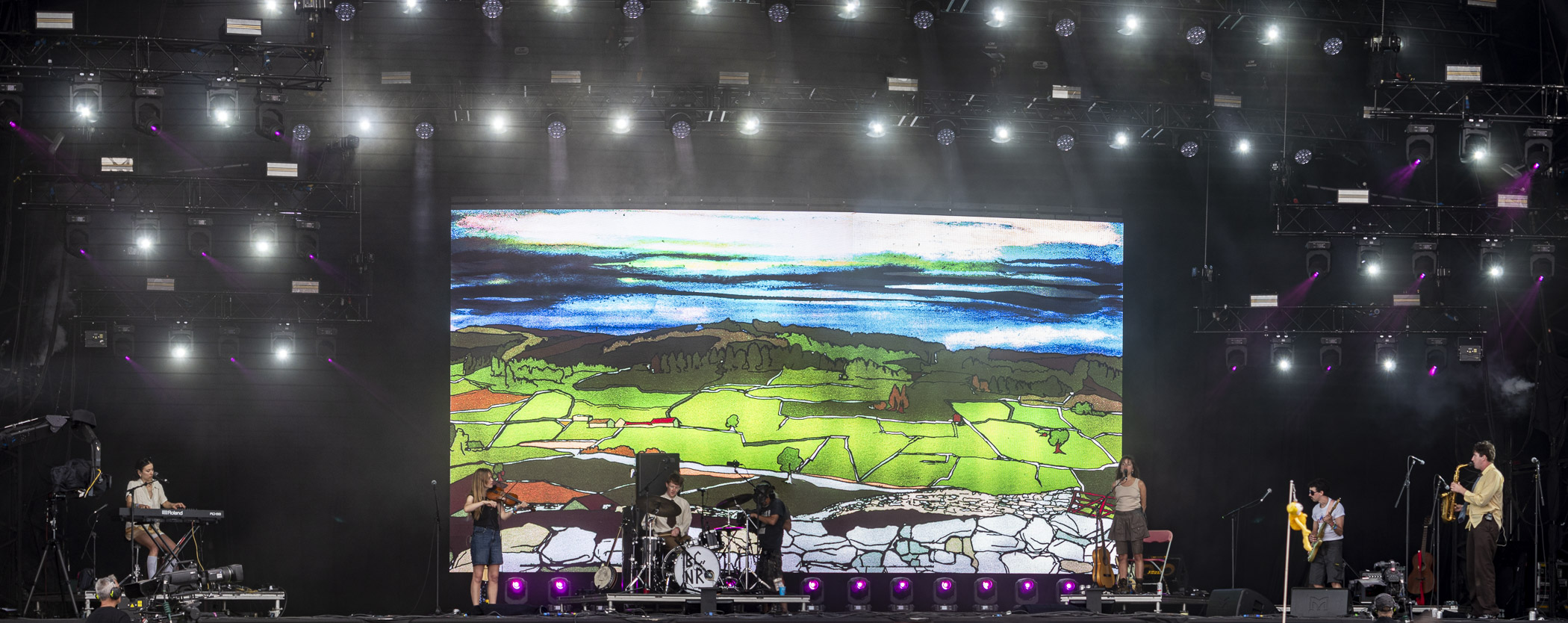
Black Country, New Road performing at Glastonbury Festival in June 2023

With Wood no longer a member, the band scheduled and announced a European tour in summer 2022, as well as an American tour supporting Black Midi. The band performed new, unreleased songs throughout their 2022 concerts, which Lewis Evans said was written specifically to give the band material to tour with and may not appear on the upcoming third album. On 14 November 2022, the band released a second EP of covers titled Never Again Pt. 2, to celebrate the band's placement on Rough Trade's album of the year list. The EP was limited to 1,500 copies and features covers of songs by Regina Spektor, Caroline Polachek, The Magnetic Fields, and Billie Eilish.

On 14 February 2023, the band posted a video on social media containing a teaser for something "coming soon" for release on 20 February. It was then announced to be Live at Bush Hall, a recording of their performances at Bush Hall, London. The video was recorded over two days and was composed entirely of unreleased material that the band had debuted at concerts in 2022, and marks the band's first release of new music since Wood's departure. An album of the performance was released by the band on 24 March 2023. On 26 September 2023, it was announced that the band had signed a global publishing deal with Transgressive Publishing. Alongside this, it was revealed that the band were working on a follow-up release to Ants from Up There while touring.

=== 2025–present: Forever Howlong ===
On 13 January 2025, the band released a 19-second teaser which included a new logo onto various social media platforms. On 22 January, the band announced that a new single titled "Besties" was set to be released on 30 January. The band later announced the release of their third album Forever Howlong, due to be released on 4 April 2025, accompanied by a North American and European tour. The second single from the album, titled "Happy Birthday", was released on 3 March, alongside an accompanying video directed by Lesley-Anne Rose. Their third single from the album, titled "For the Cold Country" was released on 26 March.

Forever Howlong was released on multiple formats including on 2xLP, CD and cassette, with various collector's editions offering alternate artwork and tracklists. To promote the album, the band embarked on an international tour beginning on 7 April 2025 in Stockport, with performances scheduled through 31 October. Forever Howlong was released to critical acclaim. It debuted at number three on the UK Albums Chart and number one on the UK Independent Albums Chart. The album also charted internationally, reaching number 16 in Germany, 22 in Australia, and 135 on the US Billboard 200, marking their first appearance on that chart.

== Artistry ==
Black Country, New Road's musical style has been described as experimental rock, post-punk and post-rock. Their music is characterised by a fusion of diverse genres and compositional approaches. While rooted in the dissonant intensity and angular rhythms of post-punk, the band incorporates a wide array of influences that set them apart from more conventional rock acts. Their early sound was frequently compared to 1990s experimental rock groups such as Slint. It has also been described as "genre-scrambling" and "deconstructed rock canvas".

Black Country, New Road have also incorporated stylistic elements from klezmer, British folk, progressive rock, and minimal music. Early in their career, the band were described as a centerpiece of a new scene of British rock bands rooted in experimental post-punk with Sprechgesang – or "talk-singing" – vocals, alongside contemporaries Black Midi, Squid, Dry Cleaning, Shame, Yard Act and Irish band Fontaines D.C. They are considered to be part of the emerging wave of British rock music known as the Windmill scene.

The band's debut album For the First Time is rooted in experimental rock, post-punk, and post-rock. Their instrumentation also draws from American composer Steve Reich and jazz musician Ornette Coleman. Wood's vocals were compared to Slint frontman Brian McMahan and The Fall lead singer Mark E. Smith; his lyrics were influenced by American singer-songwriter Father John Misty, with Wood declaring "he's not the best lyricist in the world, but what he is is entirely, entirely honest". The band often references other musicians in their songs, such as being associated to "the world's second-best Slint tribute act" in the song "Science Fair". "Track X" references their company with Black Midi. They mention Kanye West in their song "Sunglasses" with the line "leave Kanye out of this". "Athens, France" contains lyrics from Phoebe Bridgers' "Motion Sickness"; the original single also references Ariana Grande's "Thank U, Next". The band has also been noted for their unconventional merchandising choices and music videos incorporating surreal stock imagery.

Their second album Ants From Up There was written to feature a more accessible sound. It has been described as post-rock, chamber pop and indie rock. The band became "obsessed" with Canadian indie rock band Arcade Fire during the United Kingdom's COVID-19 lockdown; several critics have compared songs such as "Chaos Space Marine" and "The Place Where He Inserted the Blade" to Arcade Fire. Black Country, New Road also recalled listening to Kurt Vile and Frank Ocean for inspiration during the writing process. With their third album, following the departure of Wood, Forever Howlong has signaled a stylistic shift away from their first two albums, with the band going out of their way to avoid being "melodramatic" and aiming to be more "subtle" within their songwriting. Following Wood's departure, vocal performances across Forever Howlong were taken up by Hyde, Ellery, and Kershaw. The album, in a press release, has been described as folk, progressive rock, baroque pop and alternative rock, with comparisons to artists such as Joanna Newsom, Randy Newman, and Fiona Apple. The band also recounted that they avoided utilising instrumentation that they felt was typical for them during the recording process, with Mark stating "there's a lot of different kinds of songs on the album that I don't think we could've done before, but we can now".

== Other projects ==
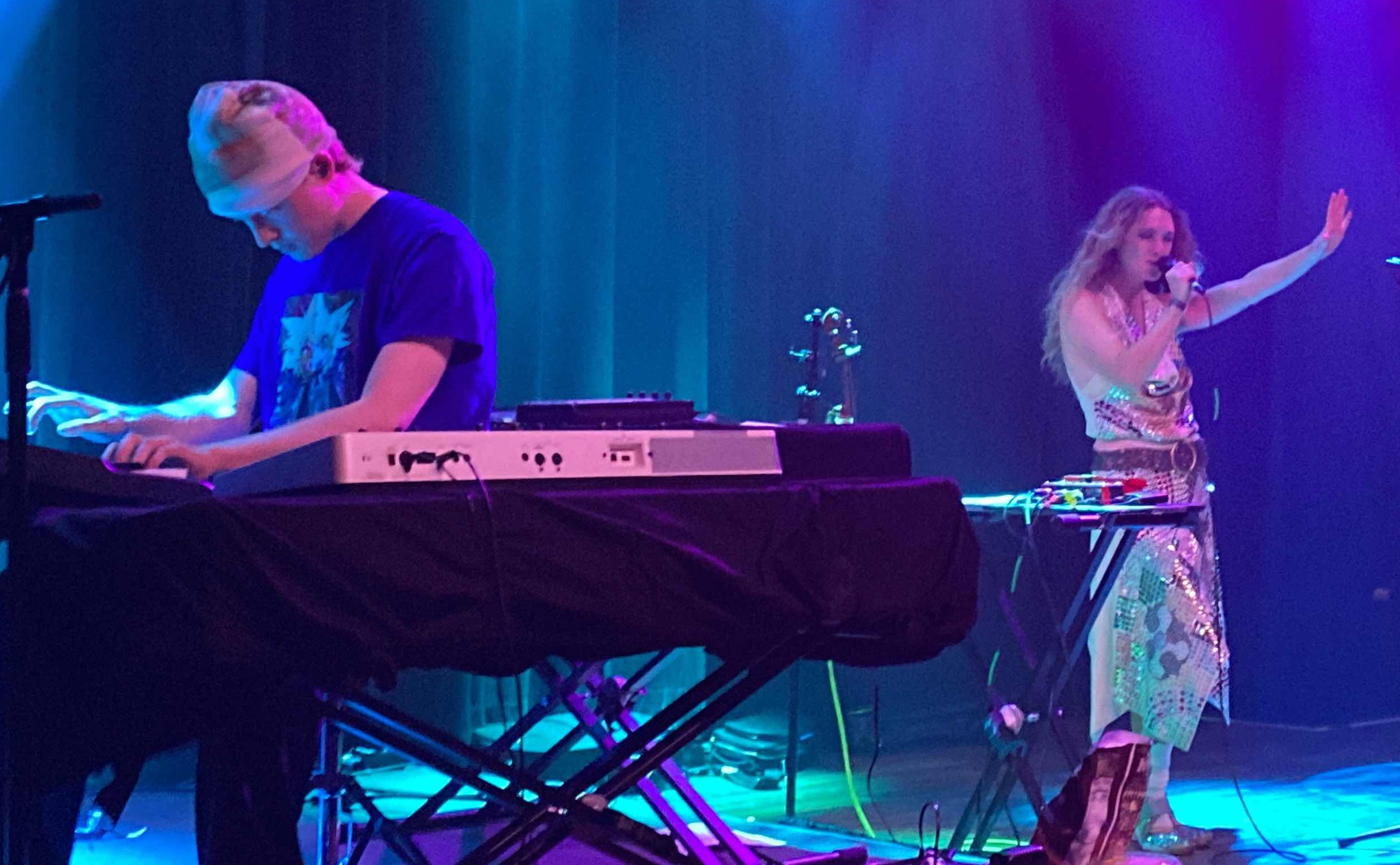
Jockstrap performing in 2023.

Beyond their own work, the band regularly performed live with fellow London experimental rock group Black Midi, touring collectively as Black Midi, New Road. Geordie Greep, the guitarist and vocalist of Black Midi, said the following: "If there's another band who are really good in the same city, who you also really get on with, there's no reason not to get together and do something proper. It's just making sure you don't do it for the sake of it and you have a solid reason for doing it". In June 2021, the group also worked with London musician Ethan P. Flynn, releasing a live version of his song "Television Show".

Violinist Georgia Ellery is one half of the experimental electronic duo Jockstrap with Taylor Skye, who have released two EPs and an album. She also collaborated with Jamie xx on a BBC Radio 3 session on 30 May 2020. She made her acting debut in 2019's Bait, which won a British Academy Film award for Outstanding Debut by a British Writer, Director or Producer. Ellery has performed and recorded as a member of conservatory folk trio Contours and Happy Beigel Klezmer Orkester, a six-piece Klezmer band formed during studies at Guildhall School of Music and Drama.

Bassist Tyler Hyde is the daughter of Underworld founder Karl Hyde. She released her first music outside of Black Country, New Road under the alias Tyler Cryde, performing a duet with boyfriend Skydaddy on the single "Tear Gas". Drummer Charlie Wayne was also a drummer of another British band, Ugly. Saxophonist Lewis Evans has made a self-titled album under the alias Good with Parents and featured on the TRAAMS single "The Greyhound". Evans also contributed saxophone to Squid's debut album Bright Green Field, released on 7 May 2021. Former vocalist Isaac Wood has occasionally released music under his solo moniker The Guest, including an acoustic version of "Track X" called "Track X (The Guest)", performed solo by Wood and predating the formation of Black Country, New Road.

== Members ==
Current members

- Tyler Hyde – bass, backing vocals (2018–present), lead vocals, guitars (2022–present)
- Lewis Evans – saxophone, flute (2018–present), backing and lead vocals (2022–present)
- Georgia Ellery – violin, mandolin (2018–present), lead and backing vocals, guitars (2022–present)
- May Kershaw – keyboards, piano, accordion, backing vocals (2018–present), lead vocals (2022–present)
- Charlie Wayne – drums, percussion, banjo (2018–present), backing vocals (2022–present)
- Luke Mark – guitars (2019–present), backing vocals (2022–present)

Former members

- Isaac Wood – lead vocals, guitars (2018–2022)

Touring musicians

- Nina Lim – violin (2021–present; occasional touring substitute for Georgia Ellery)

== Discography ==
- For the First Time (2021)
- Ants from Up There (2022)
- Forever Howlong (2025)

== Awards and nominations ==
Year	Award	Category	Nominated work	Result	Ref.
2021	Mercury Prize	Album of the Year	For the First Time	Nominated	
2022	Libera Awards	Best Breakthrough Release/Artist	For the First Time	Nominated	
2022	AIM Independent Music Awards	Best Second Album	Ants from Up There	Nominated	
2023	Libera Awards	Creative Packaging	Ants from Up There	Won	
