= Ants from Up There =

Studio album by Black Country, New Road
- Released: 4 February 2022
- Recorded: July 2021
- Studios: Chale Abbey, Isle of Wight, England
- Genres: Indie rock; chamber pop; post-rock
- Length: 58:46 (Standard); 63:59 (Japanese); 123:39 (Deluxe)
- Label: Ninja Tune
- Producer: Sergio Maschetzko

Black Country, New Road chronology
For the First Time (2021)	Ants from Up There (2022)	Live at Bush Hall (2023)

Singles from Ants from Up There
- 1. "Chaos Space Marine" Released: 12 October 2021; 2. "Bread Song" Released: 2 November 2021; 3. "Concorde" Released: 30 November 2021; 4. "Snow Globes" Released: 19 January 2022

Ants from Up There (stylised as Ants From Up There) is the second studio album by the British rock band Black Country, New Road, released on 4 February 2022 on Ninja Tune. Recorded at Chale Abbey on the Isle of Wight, the album was produced by the band's live sound engineer Sergio Maschetzko, and is the final album to feature lead vocalist and guitarist Isaac Wood, who announced his departure from the band four days prior to the album's release.

Written during COVID-19 lockdowns and road-tested during brief touring stints in support of the debut album, For the First Time (2021), Ants from Up There was released almost exactly a year after the debut, and was preceded by four singles: "Chaos Space Marine", "Bread Song", "Concorde" and "Snow Globes". The band intended to produce the album as a collective body of work, preferring to focus more on vulnerable topics than fictional scenarios and more apathetic lyrics.

The album received unanimous critical acclaim upon its release for its musical evolution, songwriting, and emotional depth, becoming Black Country, New Road's highest-charting album, debuting at number 3 on the UK Albums Chart and reaching the top 10 in Australia, Germany and the Netherlands. A deluxe edition of the album featuring live songs was released four months after.

== Background and recording ==
Following the release of their debut album For the First Time, Black Country, New Road experienced a significant rise in critical reception. Speaking to NME at the 2021 Mercury Prize awards ceremony, for which their debut album had been nominated, the band confirmed that they had already completed work on a follow-up album, described as "sad, epic, and possibly more universally likeable" and "more palatable" than their debut. Bassist Tyler Hyde stated that "we have figured out what we're trying to say, so it makes a bit more sense. Some of the songs are shorter. We attempted to write songs that were three and a half minutes".

Black Country, New Road returned to touring, as music venues reopened in summer 2021 during a brief break from the COVID-19 lockdowns. Rather than focusing on their existing songs, they began "road-testing" new material that would ultimately form the basis of Ants From Up There. Drummer Charlie Wayne said they needed the tour in order to "workshop [the] songs" and "see how they fared in front of people".

The band began writing the album in July 2021, after the United Kingdom resumed the lockdown. In an interview with Uncut, Wayne said they started recording on the day that "everyone opened up in the UK". It was recorded over three weeks at Chale Abbey Studios, with Wayne noting the album was a "continuation of [their] isolation". Sergio Maschetzko, the band's live sound engineer, produced the sessions. Hyde revealed that Maschetzko had not recorded an album before, but they picked him because the band wanted to capture their material in a live setting and wanted to record. He also said Maschetzko "sometimes [knew their] playing better than [they did]". The band experimented with vocal overdubs throughout the album, particularly on "Concorde", with it marking the first song Wood used double-tracked vocals on.

== Composition and lyrics ==
Ants from Up There primarily incorporates post-rock, chamber pop and indie rock. Its sound has been compared to Canadian indie rock bands Arcade Fire and Wolf Parade, with the band noting that during the recording process they were influenced by Arcade Fire's Funeral (2004), Sufjan Stevens' Illinois (2005), Arthur Russell's Iowa Dream (2019) and Billie Eilish's Happier Than Ever (2021). Hyde and drummer Charlie Wayne stated that the album took some structural inspiration from pop music, describing its makeup as "more conceptually pop than sounding like pop". Compared to their debut, Ants from Up There was the first album where the band specifically tweaked every song to fit with the others as "one body of work".

Many of the album's tracks stem from the initial writing sessions between Wood, Hyde and guitarist Luke Mark, who lived together during the first COVID-19 lockdown. Wayne said he first heard ideas for "Concorde" and "The Place Where He Inserted the Blade" while hanging out in their kitchen. In January 2021, a month before the release of their debut, the full band convened for a week to work on new material, where each member "brought their own constituent parts" to songs. Hyde stated that most tracks were written at the same time, being "essentially birthed" by "Basketball Shoes". Hyde and Wayne said Ants from Up There features more vulnerable lyrical topics in contrast to their debut's apathetic tone and fictional scenarios.

"Good Will Hunting"
"Good Will Hunting" existed as two songs with different time signatures; one in 6/8 and the other in 4/4. The final version merges both together.

The album opens with a 54-second instrumental piece, "Intro". It incorporates klezmer elements, a style of Jewish music which Evans and Georgia Ellery had experience playing, and was one of the first songs the band wrote, predating their debut.

"Chaos Space Marine" got its name from the eponymous miniature figurines in the Warhammer 40,000 franchise. The song's melody draws inspiration from glam rock, while the lyrics combine grandiose imagery with introspective anxiety that references England and pop culture figures like Billie Eilish.

"Concorde" was inspired by such science fiction stories as Luca and 2012. In an interview with Consequence, the band said they used the mandolin to give the song "unpredictability" and "a snappy and spiky element". Gigwise interpreted the song's meaning as "[portraying] the yearning for a lost relationship" through the metaphor of the Concorde fallacy.

"Bread Song" is musically rooted in baroque pop and post-rock, drawing inspiration from Steve Reich's Music for 18 Musicians, wherein the band play without definitive timing and cues. The track's narrator is "left feeding on crumbs" of the lasting memory of a one-sided affair and being kicked out of bed for eating toast.

While working on "Good Will Hunting" the band listened to Kurt Vile; and blended Midwest emo, jazz, and grunge textures. It was written in two versions with different time signatures, which were ultimately combined into the final version.

"Haldern" was named after the Germany-based Haldern Pop music festival the band played during the pandemic. Built on minimalist piano patterns, it crescendos from staccato strings and saxophone to "a malaise of these elements". The lyrics wrestle with self-pity. It is the only song on the album to originate from an improvisation session.

"Mark's Theme" is a saxophone-led instrumental written by Evans following the passing of his uncle Mark from COVID-19 in 2021. The Line of Best Fit described it as a "mournful instrumental subminity", akin to Tom Waits or Edward Hopper's visual world, according to MusicOMH.

"The Place Where He Inserted the Blade" is a flute-led track, evoking reciprocal and gentle feelings, and lyrically dealing with trust and vulnerability in relationships. Its recording was noted by the band as difficult due to a technical error on Wayne's part.

"Snow Globes" is a nearly 10-minute post-rock epic that begins with a repetitive guitar pattern and slowly builds tension through a harmonising guitar and polyrhythmic drumming. Wayne noted the contrast between the drum track and the rest of the instruments, serving in a more independent and expressive role. The song was performed as early as January 2020 and was featured on a 2020 Christmas livestream concert with Black Midi, with the band adding new elements to each successive live performance; its first take was used on the album. The song takes inspiration from Frank Ocean's song "White Ferrari".

"Basketball Shoes" is a twelve-minute closing track, performed as a post-rock epic and an emotional summit of the album. It contains various leitmotif taken from the rest of the songs such as "Concorde", "Snow Globes" and "Intro". Structured like a surrealist three-act play, it evolves from delicate poetry to aggressive emo, resulting in an ultimate climax of saxophone, violin, and vocals. It was one of the first songs the band wrote and predates For the First Time, originally describing an unhealthy obsession with British singer Charli XCX in its earliest form before undergoing lyrical changes for the final version.

== Release ==
Ants from Up There was announced on 12 October 2021 alongside the release of the album's first single, "Chaos Space Marine", which Wood described as "the best song [they have] ever written". The album's title was finalised by the band on the day of its deadline. It refers to the appearance of people while viewed from an airplane, tying in with the album cover and the recurring lyrical theme of the Concorde jet. The artwork for the album was made by Simon Monk. The artwork for the promotional materials came from the band members' childhood drawings. On 2 November 2021, the band released "Bread Song" as the second single. "Concorde" was released on 30 November as the album's third single. "Snow Globes", the fourth and final single, was released on 19 January 2022.

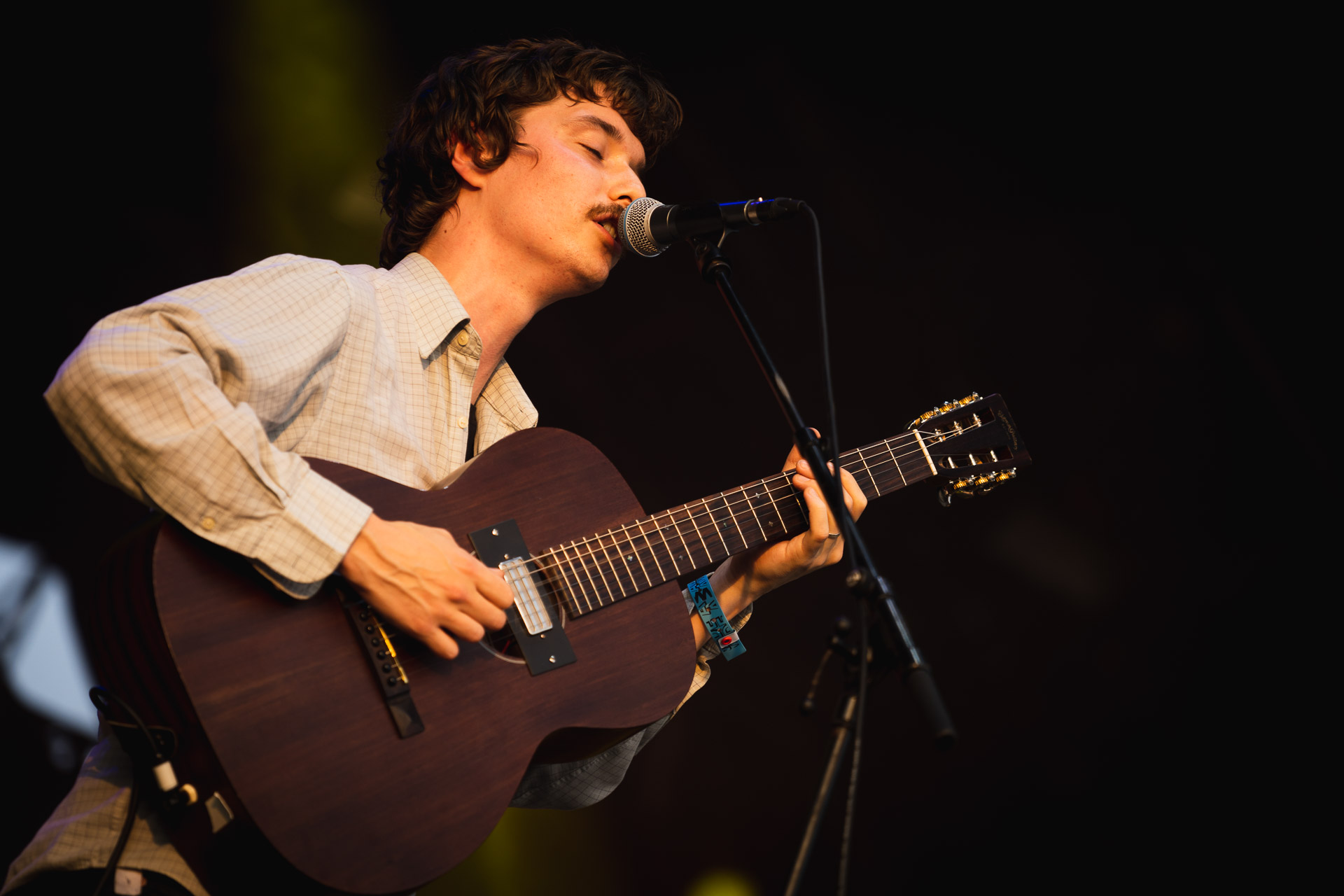
Isaac Wood formerly of Black Country, New Road

Four days before the album's release, Wood announced his departure from the band, citing mental health reasons. He clarified he was still on good terms with the band. The remaining members said they would not perform music written with Wood after his departure.

Ants from Up There was released on 4 February through Ninja Tune. The band were scheduled to begin the tour in support of the album in February, however dates were cancelled after the departure of Wood. In May, the band, sans Wood, launched another tour that concluded in September. The band once again road-tested new material on this tour, which later became Live at Bush Hall. A deluxe edition of the album was released on 10 June, featuring songs performed live at the Queen Elizabeth Hall.

== Critical reception ==
Professional ratings
Aggregate scores
Source	Rating
AnyDecentMusic?	8.6/10
Metacritic	92/100
Review scores
Source	Rating
AllMusic	4/5 stars
Clash	9/10
The Independent	5/5 stars
The Line of Best Fit	10/10
NME	5/5 stars
The Observer	5/5 stars
Pitchfork	8.4/10
PopMatters	9/10
The Skinny	4/5 stars
Uncut	4.5/5 stars

Ants from Up There received universal acclaim from music critics. At Metacritic, the album has received an average score of 92, based on 20 reviews. The album has been widely touted as a "masterpiece", receiving many perfect scores from critics upon release. According to Metacritic, it was the third-most critically acclaimed album of 2022.

Writing for NME, Will Richards proclaimed that the band managed "to pivot towards more familiar, accessible sounds and embrace traditional song structures – without sacrificing an ounce of their musical wizardry or inventiveness", declaring it "truly remarkable" and a "future cult classic" in the wake of Wood's departure. Ian Cohen of Pitchfork praised the album's "life-affirming", emo-like sentimentality in a review awarded Best New Music; he stated that by "manifesting every glimmer of hope as a heaven-sent beacon and every letdown as a plunge towards the void", the band captured the essence of "adjacent masterpieces like Neutral Milk Hotel's In the Aeroplane Over the Sea, Titus Andronicus's The Monitor, and Car Seat Headrest's Teens of Denial" en route to Ants' 'beautifully doomed fantasies'". AllMusic's Timothy Monger described the album as "an impressive one, rife with forward momentum but preempted by its own self-mythology" regarding Wood. Dafydd Jenkins of Loud and Quiet felt the album fell short of its predecessor, and felt like its songs "lead to interesting trajectories of almost-pop near-misses". Jenkins also called "Chaos Space Marine" a low-light of the album.

Special praise was reserved for Wood's songwriting, widely lauded as an album highlight for its emotional intensity and depth. Jamie Kilkenny of Clash noted that "[t]he angle of [Ants'] lyrical riches grows ever more sentimental and singular" over repeated listens, and that "only Wood could wring so much profundity from a pleading wail to 'show me the place where he inserted the blade'; or the beauty wrapped in the seemingly mundane 'particles of bread' on the marvel of 'Bread Song'". The Line of Best Fit's Kyle Kohner gave the album a perfect score, praising Wood as a "clairvoyant" author of "witty, abstract storytelling" on Ants and remarking upon his position as "the wry mouthpiece of a band... keenly speaking to a generation of young people". Tom Morgan of PopMatters applauded the band's "bold and progressive" compositions, but particularly distinguished Wood's lyrics as "unique and often profound", hailing his "deft, resonant words" for their "contemporary relevance" in contrast to those of his indie coevals. Damien Morris of The Observer noted how Wood was "often the best thing about [the band]" and called his voice and lyricism "a hoot".

Will Richards also singled out closing track "Basketball Shoes" for praise, hailing the song's "astonishing" scope and Kohner characterised it as "devastating, yet cleansing" emotional impact. Sam Richards of Uncut compared the song favourably to "Marquee Moon" and the work of Godspeed You! Black Emperor, praising it as "a moment of euphoria, catharsis or collapse" and declaring it "a gut-wrenching epic of Dostoevskian proportions". Morris also pointed out "Basketball Shoes" as a highlight of the album. The album was named a "Critic's Pick" by The New York Times. Mark Beaumont, reviewing the album for The Independent, declared that "the sheer grace and ambition of Ants... will prove tough for 2022 to top", citing the "grunge rock crescendos accompanying images of burning starships on 'Good Will Hunting', and gargantuan arias on the 12-minute 'Basketball Shoes'" as track highlights. Writing for Rolling Stone, Niall Doherty called the album a "triumph for the strange" and noted "Concorde", "The Place Where He Inserted The Blade" and "Snow Globes" as highlights. Doherty felt negatively about "Chaos Space Marine", comparing it to "a sixth-form band trying to show off in front of their hip new teacher".

=== Year-end lists ===
Ants from Up There on year-end lists
Publication	List	Rank	Ref.
Beats Per Minute	BPM's Top 50 Albums of 2022	3	
Paste	The 50 Best Albums of 2022	5	
Sputnikmusic	The 50 Best Albums of 2022	5	
Rough Trade	Albums of the Year 2022	6	
The Needle Drop	Top 50 Albums of 2022	7	
PopMatters	The 80 Best Albums of 2022	10	
Slant Magazine	The 50 Best Albums of 2022	10	
NME	The 50 Best Albums of 2022	11	
Exclaim!	Exclaim!'s 50 Best Albums of 2022	24	
Consequence	Top 50 Albums of 2022	42	
Pitchfork	The 50 Best Albums of 2022	49	

== Track listing ==
All tracks are written by Charlie Wayne, Georgia Ellery, Isaac Wood, Lewis Evans, Luke Mark, May Kershaw, and Tyler Hyde.

No.	Title	Length
1.	"Intro"	0:54
2.	"Chaos Space Marine"	3:36
3.	"Concorde"	6:03
4.	"Bread Song"	6:20
5.	"Good Will Hunting"	4:58
6.	"Haldern"	5:05
7.	"Mark's Theme"	2:47
8.	"The Place Where He Inserted the Blade"	7:13
9.	"Snow Globes"	9:13
10.	"Basketball Shoes"	12:37
Total length:		58:46

Deluxe version disc 2 (Live from the Queen Elizabeth Hall)
No.	Title	Length
1.	"Mark's Theme"	2:43
2.	"Instrumental"	5:25
3.	"Athens, France"	6:49
4.	"Science Fair"	6:33
5.	"Sunglasses"	8:59
6.	"Track X"	5:09
7.	"Opus"	8:56
8.	"Bread Song"	6:55
9.	"Basketball Shoes"	13:24
Total length:		123:39

Japanese edition (bonus track)
No.	Title	Length
11.	"Haldern" (Piano Version)	5:00
Total length:		63:58

== Personnel ==
Adapted from vinyl liner notes and Uncut.

=== Black Country, New Road ===
- Charlie Wayne – drums, backing vocals
- Georgia Ellery – violin, mandolin, cello, backing vocals
- Isaac Wood – vocals, guitar
- Lewis Evans – saxophone, flute, backing vocals
- Luke Mark – guitar, backing vocals
- May Kershaw – keyboards, marimba, glockenspiel, backing vocals
- Tyler Hyde – bass, backing vocals

=== Additional personnel ===
- Tony Fagg – banjo (track 2)
- Mark Paton – vocals (track 7)
- Basil Tierney – additional drums (track 10)
- Christian Wright – mastering
- Sergio Maschetzko – engineering, mixing
- David Granshaw – engineering, mixing
- Tomas Moreno – additional engineering
- Simon Monk – art
- Joseph Durnan – layout

== Charts ==
Chart performance for Ants from Up There
Chart (2022)	Peak position
Australian Albums (ARIA)	6
Austrian Albums (Ö3 Austria)	29
Belgian Albums (Ultratop Flanders)	11
Belgian Albums (Ultratop Wallonia)	51
Dutch Albums (Album Top 100)	9
French Albums (SNEP)	144
German Albums (Offizielle Top 100)	10
Irish Albums (Official Charts)	18
Italian Albums (FIMI)	74
New Zealand Albums (RMNZ)	17
Scottish Albums (Official Charts)	3
Swiss Albums (Schweizer Hitparade)	25
UK Albums (Official Charts)	3
UK Independent Albums (Official Charts)	2
US Heatseekers Albums (Billboard)	1
US Independent Albums (Billboard)	35
US Top Album Sales (Billboard)	12
US Top Alternative Albums (Billboard)	24
US Top Rock Albums (Billboard)	38

== Certifications ==
Certifications for Ants From Up There
Region	Certification	Certified units/sales
United Kingdom (BPI)	Silver	60,000^{‡}
^{‡} Sales+streaming figures based on certification alone.
