= Sunglasses (Black Country, New Road song) =

2019 song by Black Country, New Road

- Cover of the 2019 digital release

Single by Black Country, New Road
- Released: 26 July 2019
- Recorded: April–May 2019
- Studio: Modal Studios (Willesden, London)
- Genre: Post-punk; post-rock
- Length: 8:54
- Label: Speedy Wunderground; Blank Editions; PIAS
- Songwriters: Charlie Wayne; Georgia Ellery; Isaac Wood; Lewis Evans; Luke Mark; May Kershaw; Tyler Hyde
- Producer: Andy Savours

Black Country, New Road singles chronology
"Athen's, France" (2019)	"Sunglasses" (2019)	"Science Fair" (2020)

"Sunglasses"

Song by Black Country, New Road

from the album For the First Time
- Released: 5 February 2021
- Recorded: March 2020
- Studio: Modal Studios (Willesden, London)
- Genre: Post-punk; post-rock
- Length: 9:51
- Label: Ninja Tune
- Songwriters: Charlie Wayne; Georgia Ellery; Isaac Wood; Lewis Evans; Luke Mark; May Kershaw; Tyler Hyde
- Producer: Andy Savours

"Sunglasses" is a song by the English rock band Black Country, New Road. It was originally released as the band's second single on 26 July 2019 through Speedy Wunderground. The track was later re-recorded for their debut album, For the First Time, released on 5 February 2021 by Ninja Tune. Produced by Andy Savours, "Sunglasses" is a nearly nine-minute post-punk and post-rock track that incorporates elements of noise rock and free jazz. For the 2021 album version, a minute-long droning guitar intro was introduced, as well as several lyrical changes.

Lyrically, vocalist Isaac Wood adopts an exaggerated persona, exploring themes of modern insecurity, masculinity, and sexual inadequacy through that lens.

The song received critical acclaim upon its 2019 release, with its limited-edition vinyl selling out within hours; the debut album's re-recording was met with similar praise, though its structural revisions drew some criticism.

== Background and recording ==
Black Country, New Road formed in 2018 following the disbandment of East Cambridgeshire-based band Nervous Conditions, after allegations of sexual assault were made against its frontman. Six of its former members reassembled, later recording their debut single, "Athen's, France", with producer Dan Carey; the track was released on 18 January 2019 through his label Speedy Wunderground. Following the debut's release, the group expanded to a seven-piece lineup with the addition of second guitarist Luke Mark in early 2019.

Acting on a recommendation from their manager, Dan McEvoy, the band worked with producer Andy Savours for their second single, "Sunglasses". (Note: Dan Carey is often misattributed as the song's producer, though he did not produce, engineer or mix the single.) The song was recorded between April and May 2019 at Savours's Modal Studios, located in the Battery Studios building in Willesden, London. In an interview with Mojo, bassist Tyler Hyde recalled Carey instructed the band to record "Sunglasses" in a single take.

The band later said that Savours's recording method, and the sound it produced on "Sunglasses", felt "much more appropriate" to the direction they wanted to pursue on their debut album. Savours recalled the band's collective sound, despite their large lineup, as "focused and compact". He additionally described "Sunglasses", and its nine-minute runtime, as having "no waste or excess".

== Composition and lyrics ==
"It describes a series of events, loosely connected, all yet to happen. The song was intended to be highly inspirational. The lyrics are sometimes concerned with symbols of wealth or affluence but they are not written from a critical or even external position."

— Isaac Wood in the 2019 single's press release, on the song's themes

"Sunglasses" is a nearly nine-minute song that has been described as post-punk and post-rock, with additional elements of noise rock and free jazz. The track's first two minutes establish a slow, minimal groove, built upon a foundation of gentle guitar, drums, and ambient noise. During this introductory section, a bassline enters the arrangement, and Isaac Wood's spoken word vocals enter as the musical tension gradually rises, with the addition of a gentle saxophone. The arrangement intensifies through his increasingly strained delivery until the saxophone erupts into a shrieking skronk, driving the song into a chaotic crescendo.

Following a structural breakdown, a sudden shift back to a simple guitar riff and drums begins. Wood's vocal delivery temporarily calms, and the band layers the instruments to once again increase the track's pace. The vocals and saxophone eventually re-enter over the arrangement, producing what Joyzine referred to as a "post-punk spasmodic attack" as the track ultimately morphs into an explosion of free jazz and noise.

"Sunglasses" (single)

"Sunglasses" (album)
The raw sound and frantic vocals of the 2019 single (top) contrast with the polished production and melodic delivery of the 2021 re-recording (bottom).

Clash characterized the 2019 single as "a timely riposte to young middle class anxiety". In a December 2019 interview with The Quietus, Wood said he wrote band's first two singles from the perspective of an "inner dude man relentlessly defending himself" in times of insecurity, though lamented the possible "reductive and one-dimensional portrayal of women" as a result.

The following month, discussing his early sexual lyrics with Loud and Quiet, he stated that "songs about sex are never about sex", likening them to songs about cars as a metaphor for uncontrollable "things of great weight and fuel consumption". Writing for The Guardian, Kitty Empire theorized Wood's self-described virginity and the song's "tales of bad sex" as "playing with" a public persona.

=== 2021 album version ===
For the band's 2021 debut album, For the First Time, "Sunglasses" was re-recorded and reworked. The album was recorded over a six-day period in March 2020 in producer Andy Savours's studio, prior to the COVID-19 lockdown in the United Kingdom. The goal was to capture the energy of their live sound. For the First Time's version of "Sunglasses" opens with a new, minute-long droning guitar intro, featuring a distorted solo that transitions into the track's established melody. Drummer Charlie Wayne identified the newer, quieter sections of the song as the most difficult to record, as it is harder for a seven-piece band to sound "soft and considered" than loud.

The re-recording also contains several lyrical revisions, notably altering a mention of "big pharma" to "pig" and replacing a line from the original single's chorus, "And fuck me like you mean it this time, Isaac" with "And burn what’s left of all the cards you kept". The line "I am invincible in these sunglasses" is interpreted as a desperate search for a shield or a new identity. Saxophonist Lewis Evans said that the lyrics were written before the violin and saxophone parts were composed, allowing the musicians to respond rhythmically to Isaac Wood's delivery.

== Release and packaging ==
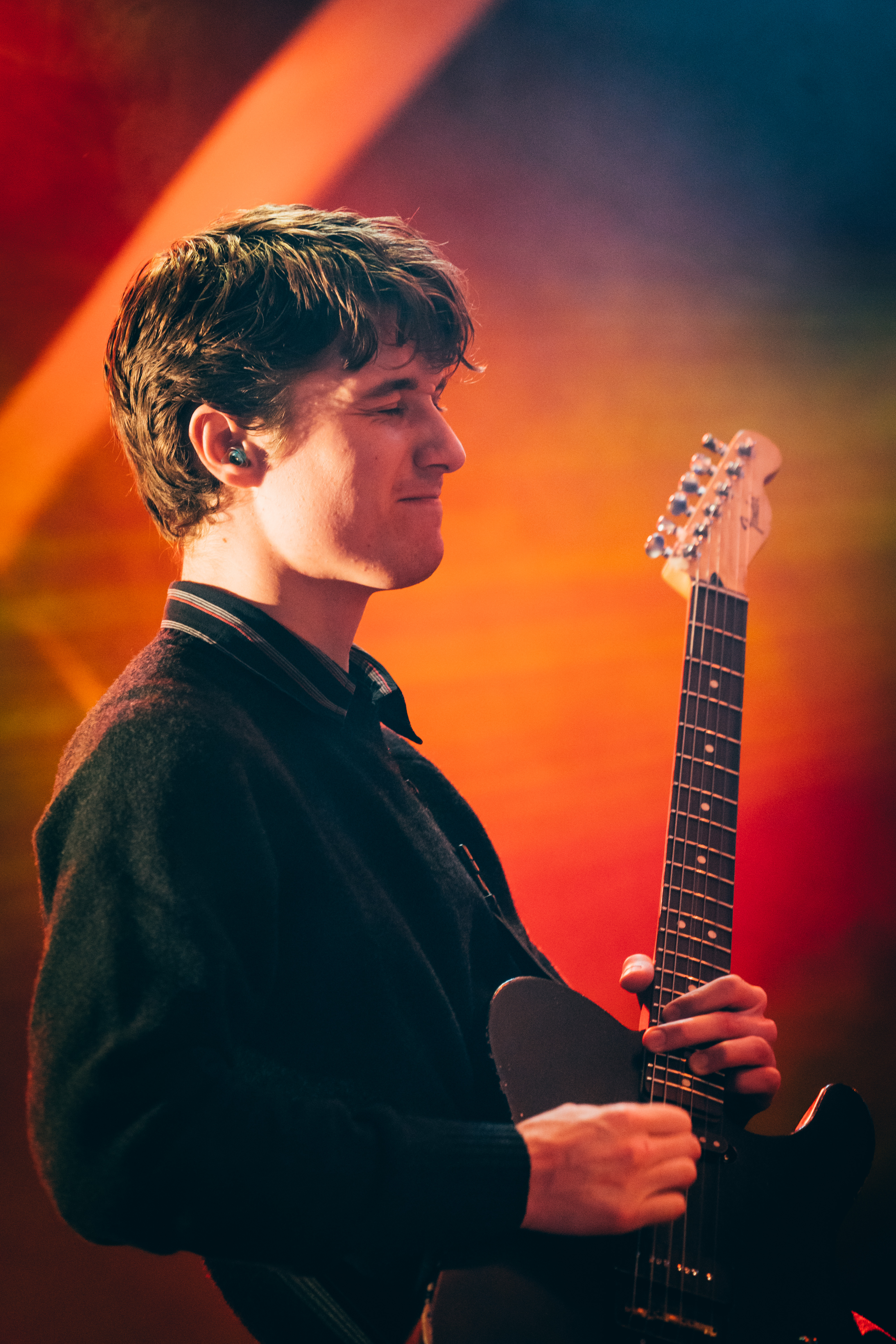
Vocalist Isaac Wood (pictured in 2020) grew critical of his early lyricism on "Sunglasses", leading him to revise the song's structure.

"Sunglasses" was released digitally on 26 July 2019 through Speedy Wunderground, with a physical release following on 6 September through Blank Editions, limited to 500 copies pressed on 7-inch vinyl. Every copy featured a unique Polaroid photograph selected by the band on its cover. The first pressing sold out within two hours of its initial announcement, prompting Blank Editions to issue a second, limited to 250 copies. Unlike the unique Polaroids previously used, the cover art was standardized to match the digital release. The third and final pressing updated the cover art once more, featuring a photograph of band members Isaac Wood and Tyler Hyde physically assembling the original Polaroid sleeves.

=== Music videos ===
Two music videos for "Sunglasses" were released. The first was uploaded to YouTube on 25 July 2019 alongside the single, composed of still frames from GoPro footage found online, which the band used for the 7-inch vinyl's Polaroid photographs. The second, directed by Bart Price, coincided with the release of For the First Time on 5 February 2021. Price served as a creative director for the album, using stock photography and stock footage as the basis for his music videos, particularly from Unsplash. The band's little knowledge of Price led Tyler Hyde to describe him as "this mysterious guy that no one really knows much about".

== Reception ==
Upon its initial 2019 release, "Sunglasses" was met with critical acclaim. Despite Black Country, New Road having only released two singles up to that point, The Quietus co-founder and editor John Doran declared the band "the best in the entire world." Stereogum's Peter Helman further noted the band's early hype, describing the track's nine-minute runtime as a "wild ride". Ioan Humphreys of Joyzine hailed the single as "one of the best things I have heard in the last 10 [or] 20 years". Writing for The Line of Best Fit, Stan Rastogi praised the group's "post-punk ingenuity," highlighting the song's "poetic hysteria" and "chaotically artful performance".

Alyana Vera of Post-Trash said that Isaac Wood's more buoyant vocal delivery makes the track feel "almost like a reprise" of its earlier iteration.

Cheltenham-based DEYA Brewing Company named a sour IPA "I Am Locked Away in a High-Tech, Wraparound, Translucent, Blue-Tinted Fortress" after the song's lyrics. Although the release was not sanctioned by the band, they opted not to pursue legal action.

== Track listing ==
=== Digital download and streaming (2019) ===
No.	Title	Length
1.	"Sunglasses"	8:54
2.	"Sunglasses (Edit)"	4:36
Total length:		13:30

=== 7-inch single (Blank Editions) ===
No.	Title	Length
1.	"Sunglasses"
2.	"Sunglasses (Cont.)"

== Personnel ==
=== 2019 single ===
Adapted from the 2019 single's press release.

Black Country, New Road

- May Kershaw – keyboards
- Charlie Wayne – drums
- Luke Mark – guitar
- Isaac Wood – vocals, guitar
- Tyler Hyde – bass
- Lewis Evans – saxophone
- Georgia Ellery – violin

Technical

- Andy Savours – producer, engineer, mixer

=== 2021 album version ===
Adapted from vinyl liner notes and XLR8R.

Black Country, New Road

- Isaac Wood – vocals, guitar
- Tyler Hyde – bass
- Lewis Evans – saxophone
- Georgia Ellery – violin
- May Kershaw – keyboards
- Charlie Wayne – drums
- Luke Mark – guitar

Technical

- Andy Savours – producer, engineer, mixer
- Joshua Rumble – assistance
- Guy Davie – mastering
