= For the First Time (Black Country, New Road album) =

Studio album by Black Country, New Road
- Released: 5 February 2021
- Recorded: March 2020
- Genres: Experimental rock; post-punk; math rock; post-rock
- Length: 40:44
- Label: Ninja Tune
- Producer: Andy Savours

Black Country, New Road chronology
For the First Time (2021)	Ants from Up There (2022)

Singles from For the First Time
- 1. "Science Fair" Released: 28 October 2020; 2. "Track X" Released: 11 January 2021

For the First Time (stylised in sentence case) is the debut studio album by the British rock band Black Country, New Road, released on 5 February 2021, through Ninja Tune. It was produced by Andy Savours and recorded in March 2020 during the early stages of the COVID-19 lockdown in the United Kingdom. The album includes reworked versions of the band's earlier singles "Athens, France" and "Sunglasses", alongside new material such as the singles "Science Fair" and "Track X".

For the First Time is an experimental rock, post-punk, and post-rock album, blending elements of klezmer, and free jazz. Themes explored on the album include identity, anxiety, and cultural disillusionment. The album received critical acclaim for its dynamic instrumentation, intense performances, and emotionally charged lyrics delivered in Isaac Wood's idiosyncratic vocal style. For the First Time was nominated for the 2021 Mercury Prize and charted in several countries, debuting at No. 4 on the UK Albums Chart.

== Background ==
In 2014, future members of Black Country, New Road—Tyler Hyde, Lewis Evans, Georgia Ellery, May Kershaw, Charlie Wayne and Isaac Wood, alongside front man Connor Browne and drummer Jonny Pyke—formed the East Cambridgeshire-based band Nervous Conditions. Following multiple allegations of sexual assault against Browne, Nervous Conditions split in early 2018. Black Country, New Road emerged in 2018—without Browne and Pyke—within the South London music scene. They most notably performed at the Brixton Windmill venue, and rapidly garnered attention for their live shows and early recordings.

Black Country, New Road released their debut single, "Athens, France" in January 2019 through Speedy Wunderground. In early 2019, Luke Mark joined Black Country, New Road as a second guitarist, expanding the band to a seven-piece lineup. It was followed by their second single, "Sunglasses", released later that year. These releases garnered attention from critics, for experimenting and blending of a variety of sounds, and developed a strong cult following, with some physical copies reportedly being resold for over £100.

== Recording and production ==
For the First Time was produced by Andy Savours and recorded "relatively quickly" in March 2020, during the early stages of the United Kingdom's first COVID-19 lockdown. That October, the band signed with the English record label Ninja Tune. The album was intended to be a documentation of the band's state during this period. Prior to entering the studio, the band had extensively toured and rehearsed the tracks, resulting in tight and energetic performances. The album title is a reference to Dave Brubeck's 1973 live album We're All Together Again for the First Time.

Two songs were re-recorded for For the First Time: "Athens, France" and "Sunglasses". The re-recorded version of "Athens, France" features changed lyrics, notably removing some sexually explicit content, and includes a warmer, more harmonious outro. In "Sunglasses", a new distorted guitar intro was added, transitions were smoothed out, and frontman Isaac Wood adopted a more melodic vocal approach, introducing harmonies and a tone that was interpreted as more vulnerable compared to the original's composition. Wood later expressed regret about the portrayal of women in some early songs, describing his songwriting as rooted in personal insecurity.

The recording process was collaborative and attentive, with the members carefully balancing dynamics by incorporating contrasting quiet and loud sections to create progression and narrative within the songs. While some effects and arrangements were planned in advance, there was room for spontaneous creativity, capturing the band's mood at the time. According to the band, their debut album sums up their first 18-month journey in which they wanted it to sound "exactly how we love to sound live".

We've since learnt our best asset: We can play quietly. We've taken that and used it so it's more dynamic. Intensity worked for us with those early recordings, like, 'Oh my god, this band is so intense and angsty', but this record is a much more considered approach.

— The band's saxophonist, Lewis Evans, on For the First Time, in an interview with Consequence of Sound.

== Musical style ==
For the First Time is an experimental rock, post-punk, and post-rock record with additional elements and influences including klezmer music, math rock, noise, avant-garde jazz, free jazz, Afrobeat, and classical music. Max Freedman from Paste noticed that the band had a clear preference for atmospherics over post-punk on For the First Time. The band's instrumentation, featuring saxophone, violin, and keyboards alongside traditional rock elements, contributes to its distinctive sound. The group's membership includes both classically trained and self-taught musicians, resulting in complex and extended compositions. The album's sonic profile has been described by music journalists as "intens[e]", "unpredictable", and "ferocious"; it features "organized chaos" by often incorporating post-rock crescendos, jazz improvisation, and abrupt changes.

Vocalist and guitarist Isaac Wood delivers lyrics in a distinctive style that fluctuates between spoken word, half-sung passages, and anguished outbursts. His vocal delivery has been described by music journalists as "begulingly nervous", "raw", and "darkly poetic". The lyrics explore themes including self-denial, inferiority, emotional exhaustion, cultural loss, and the pervasive influence of digital culture. Lyrically, the album is marked by self-referentiality, cultural commentary, and an interplay of wit and vulnerability. Reviewers have described the lyrics as densely packed and sometimes overwhelming, while also noting their honesty and satirical qualities. The texts incorporate a broad range of references spanning pop culture, capitalism, and modern anxieties, mentioning figures and artifacts such as Kanye West, Danish crime dramas, Fonzie, NutriBullets, Bruce Springsteen, Richard Hell, Scott Walker, and the British band Black Midi.

=== Tracks ===
The album comprises six tracks with a total length of 40 minutes. It includes both previously released material and new compositions, alongside four of the tracks that had been previously released as singles or performed live, whereas two were newly introduced upon the album's release.

Opening the album, "Instrumental" functions as a statement of intent, often referred to as an "auditory manifesto". The track blends klezmer, krautrock rhythms and avant-garde jazz, drawing comparisons by music journalists to a Blue Note-era hard bop performance and an RPG battle theme. It centers around an Afrobeat-tinged four-note ostinato, with the band's members providing a propulsive groove beneath layers of pounding drums, saxophone, guitar, piano arpeggios, and a distinctive synthesiser line from May Kershaw.

The revised version of "Athens, France" contains substantial lyrical and stylistic revisions compared to its original version. The album version features a more cohesive arrangement, combining post-punk and post-hardcore influences with sweeping strings and a jazz-inflected coda. The track is characterized by a restrained drumming, winding bassline, and a warm, harmonically rich outro. Wood rewrote several lines, omitting sexually explicit content, which the band seemingly no longer felt comfortable discussing. The reworking underscores the band's evolving perspective on themes of fame, regret, and identity.

"Science Fair" embraces the band's maximalist tendencies. The composition begins with squalling guitar feedback that disrupts looping viola and saxophone figures, eventually giving way to an aggressive wall of noise. Lyrically, it mentions a student living with his mother, who tries to impress a girl he met in a science fair by setting things on fire. It draws on surreal imagery and references to modern Internet culture, narrated in Wood's stuttering, spoken-word delivery. The song climaxes in a frenzied repetition of "It's Black Country out there!", a line that recurs later in the album, encapsulating the group's anxieties about belonging and identity.

"Sunglasses" is an approximately ten-minute track with elements of math rock and post-punk. The revised version opens with a new distorted guitar drone and features a smoother structural transition compared to its earlier composition. It also includes a more melodic vocal delivery by Wood, including harmonies and a tone described by some as more vulnerable than in the original. The delivery contains references to Fonzie, Richard Hell, and consumer products.

"Track X" marks the band's stylistic departure, trading the band's usual dissonance for a gentle, orchestral atmosphere, built around a reworked guitar riff adopted from "Sunglasses". The arrangement draws comparisons to artists such as Dirty Projectors and Sufjan Stevens, and has been described as an acid folk ballad and post-minimalist composition by music journalists. Wood's lyrics are often recounting fragmented memories and of past relationship events. Its restrained structure and absence of a climactic breakdown distinguish it from the rest of the album, offering a moment of reprieve and signaling the band's potential future directions.

The album ends with "Opus", reprising many of the motifs introduced in "Instrumental", but expands them into an eight-minute composition with dramatic scope. Influenced heavily by jazz and klezmer, the track cycles through a series of dynamic shifts, alternating between frenzied saxophone leads and quieter violin interludes. Wood delivers "rapid left-field", apocalyptic vocals, culminating in the line "What we built must fall to the rising flames", which has been interpreted as a metaphorical declaration of creative destruction. The song references Springsteen and revisits earlier lyrical fragments, providing a sense of thematic closure.

== Release ==
For the First Time was originally intended for an October 2020 release, but was postponed due to pandemic-related disruptions. On 28 October 2020, the band officially announced For the First Time and its track listing alongside the release of its lead single, "Science Fair". On 11 January 2021, "Track X" was released as the second single from the album. The album was eventually released on 5 February 2021, through Ninja Tune. Prior to the album's release, it was listed as one of the most anticipated albums of February 2021 by several media publications.

As a band known for their commanding stage presence, members expressed frustration at being unable to tour and viewed live performance as integral to their identity, a period in which the infrastructure of popular music had largely "collapsed in on itself" due to COVID-19 restrictions on live performances and touring. At the time of the release, the band had already begun working on new material for a follow-up album. In interviews, they suggested that their second album would pursue a different direction, exploring more restrained dynamics and distancing themselves from the themes and intensity of their debut.

== Critical reception ==
Professional ratings
Aggregate scores
Source	Rating
AnyDecentMusic?	8.2/10
Metacritic	83/100
Review scores
Source	Rating
AllMusic	3.5/5 stars
Clash	9/10
Exclaim!	8/10
The Independent	2/5 stars
The Line of Best Fit	9/10
MusicOMH	4/5 stars
NME	5/5 stars
The Observer	5/5 stars
Pitchfork	7.4/10
The Times	5/5 stars

For the First Time has received acclaim from critics. At Metacritic, which assigns a weighted average rating out of 100 to reviews from mainstream publications, the album received an average score of 83 based on 17 reviews, indicating "universal acclaim". Aggregator AnyDecentMusic? gave the album an 8.2 out of 10, based on their assessment of the critical consensus.

Kitty Empire of The Observer regarded For the First Time as one of the best albums of the year, writing that it portrayed "a joyful disregard for genre". Writing for Clash, Hayley Scott called the album "a significant milestone in modern guitar music" that established Black Country, New Road as "a much-needed anomaly". Reviewing for The Line of Best Fit, Lauren Down wrote the album is "ferocious and endlessly intelligent", noting its mix of careful structure and improvisation, marked by tension and intensity. Charlie McQuaid of Exclaim! described the album as an honest reflection of the band's current state, noting that "even that is evolving". Ryan Leas from Stereogum listed it as the best album of its release week, praising the production and the band's storytelling.

B. Sassons of PopMatters praised the album's experimental production, poetic lyrics, and versatile vocals, stating that it "maintains a well-tempered intensity" that is both refined and emotionally honest. Paste's Max Freedman agreed, adding that the album showcased "a clear preference for atmospherics over post-punk". Kyle Kohner of Beats Per Minute likened the album's '90s experimental rock sound to that of American rock band Slint, further writing that the band "devised a record – and sound – unrivaled by most acts emerging from the latest post-punk resurgence". Luke Cartledge of NME dubbed the album as "utterly mesmerising", calling the album both a reflection of the band's development so far and an indication of their future direction. Reviewing for AllMusic, Paul Simpson noted that while the vocals and frequent "name-dropping" could at times be "overbearing", the band displayed "strong and adventurous" musicianship and were "undeniably original". MusicOMH's Matt Cotsell was positive in his review, calling the album "inventive and likeable" and suggesting it could earn the band a large following.

Alex Cabré of DIY was less favourable in his review of the album, saying that it was "perhaps less an album to be enjoyed as a cerebral puzzle to be tackled". In a more negative review, Roisin O'Connor of The Independent said that the record was "a letdown after the early hype" and felt "tedious and predictable". The album was nominated for the Mercury Prize in 2021, and was commercially successful, charting in many countries and notably debuting at No. 4 on the UK Albums Chart.

=== Year-end lists ===
For the First Time appeared 1st on Loud and Quiet's list and 5th on DIY. It also appeared in the top 40 spots of the best albums of 2021 lists of The Quietus, Consequence, Paste, NME, and The Guardian.

For the First Time on year-end lists
Publication	List	Rank	Ref.
Loud and Quiet	Albums of the Year 2021	1	
DIY	DIY's Best Albums of 2021	5	
Paste	The 50 Best Albums of 2021	40	
NME	The 50 Best Albums of 2021	40	
The Quietus	Quietus Albums of the Year 2021	34	
The Guardian	The 50 Best Albums of 2021	44	
Consequence	Top 50 Albums of 2021	37	

== Track listing ==
All tracks are written by Charlie Wayne, Georgia Ellery, Isaac Wood, Lewis Evans, Luke Mark, May Kershaw, and Tyler Hyde.

No.	Title	Length
1.	"Instrumental"	5:27
2.	"Athens, France"	6:22
3.	"Science Fair"	6:20
4.	"Sunglasses"	9:50
5.	"Track X"	4:44
6.	"Opus"	8:01
Total length:		40:44

== Personnel ==
=== Black Country, New Road ===
- Isaac Wood – vocals, lead guitar
- Luke Mark – guitar
- May Kershaw – keyboards
- Georgia Ellery – violin
- Lewis Evans – saxophone
- Tyler Hyde – bass, vocals (track 5)
- Charlie Wayne – drums

=== Additional personnel ===
- Andy Savours – production, mixing, engineering
- Guy Davie – mastering
- Bart Price – artwork
- Joshua Rumble – assistance

== Charts ==
Chart performance for For the First Time
Chart (2021)	Peak position
Australian Albums (ARIA)	94
Austrian Albums (Ö3 Austria)	60
Belgian Albums (Ultratop Flanders)	52
Belgian Albums (Ultratop Wallonia)	91
German Albums (Offizielle Top 100)	44
Scottish Albums (Official Charts)	5
UK Albums (Official Charts)	4
US Heatseekers Albums (Billboard)	15
US Tastemaker Albums (Billboard)	4
US Top Album Sales (Billboard)	50
