= Isaac Wood (musician) =

English musician

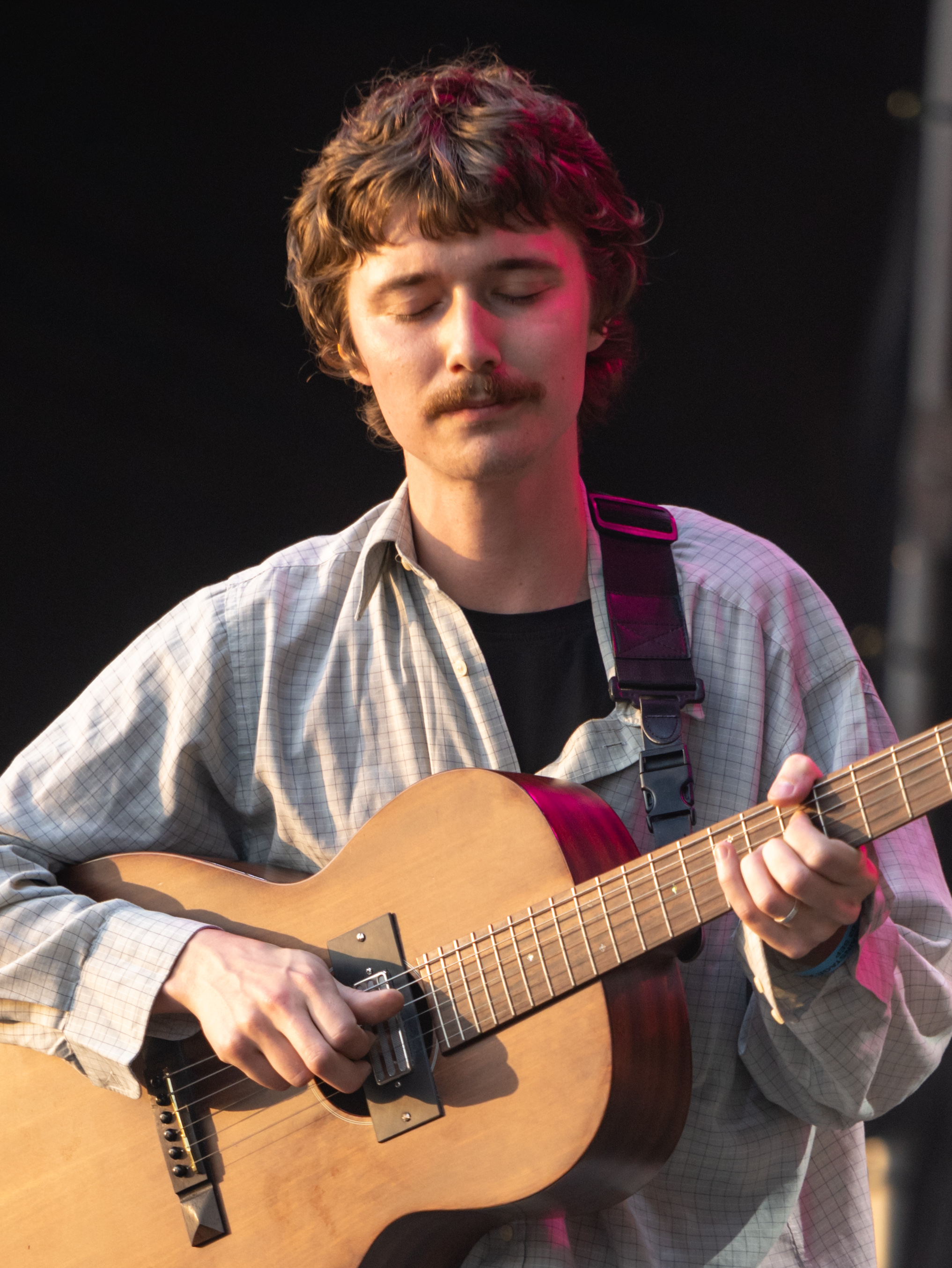
- Wood in 2021

Background information
- Also known as: The Guest
- Born: 1998 or 1999 (age 27–28)
- Genres: Art rock; chamber pop; progressive folk; post-rock; post-punk (early); math rock (early)
- Instruments: Vocals; guitar
- Works: Black Country, New Road discography
- Years active: 2014–2022; 2026–present
- Labels: Ninja Tune; Speedy Wunderground
- Formerly of: Nervous Conditions; Black Country, New Road

Isaac Wood is an English musician who was the lead vocalist and guitarist for the English rock band Black Country, New Road from their formation in 2018 until 2022. He has also released solo music under the moniker The Guest.

A key figure in the Windmill scene, Wood's vocal style primarily involved spoken word, though he distinctly fluctuated between alternative forms of delivery such as half-sung passages and anguished outbursts. Wood's lyricism and performances for Black Country, New Road were praised and celebrated by media outlets, which contributed to their early successes. When questioned if Black Country, New Road was "Isaac's band", Wood denied traditional ownership.

Four days before the release of their sophomore album Ants from Up There, Isaac Wood departed Black Country, New Road, citing mental health struggles. Subsequently, the band cancelled their planned tour and clarified that they would not perform any music released prior to his departure.

In June 2026, Wood was announced as a supporting act for all 12 European dates of Phoebe Bridgers' upcoming The Lost Tour, marking his first live appearance since leaving Black Country, New Road. Wood will be performing as part of a currently untitled band, performing songs written in collaboration with Anaïs Meiringer. Wood was also credited on "Best Dressed", a bonus track from Bridgers' Lost Weekend available only on physical copies of the album.

== Discography ==
=== As The Guest ===
- "Good Dog vs. Bad Dog" (with James Martin, 2019)
- "Theme From Failure, Pt. 1" (2020)

=== With Black Country, New Road ===
- For the First Time (2021)
- Ants from Up There (2022)
