= List of songs recorded by Arctic Monkeys =

Songs recorded by English band

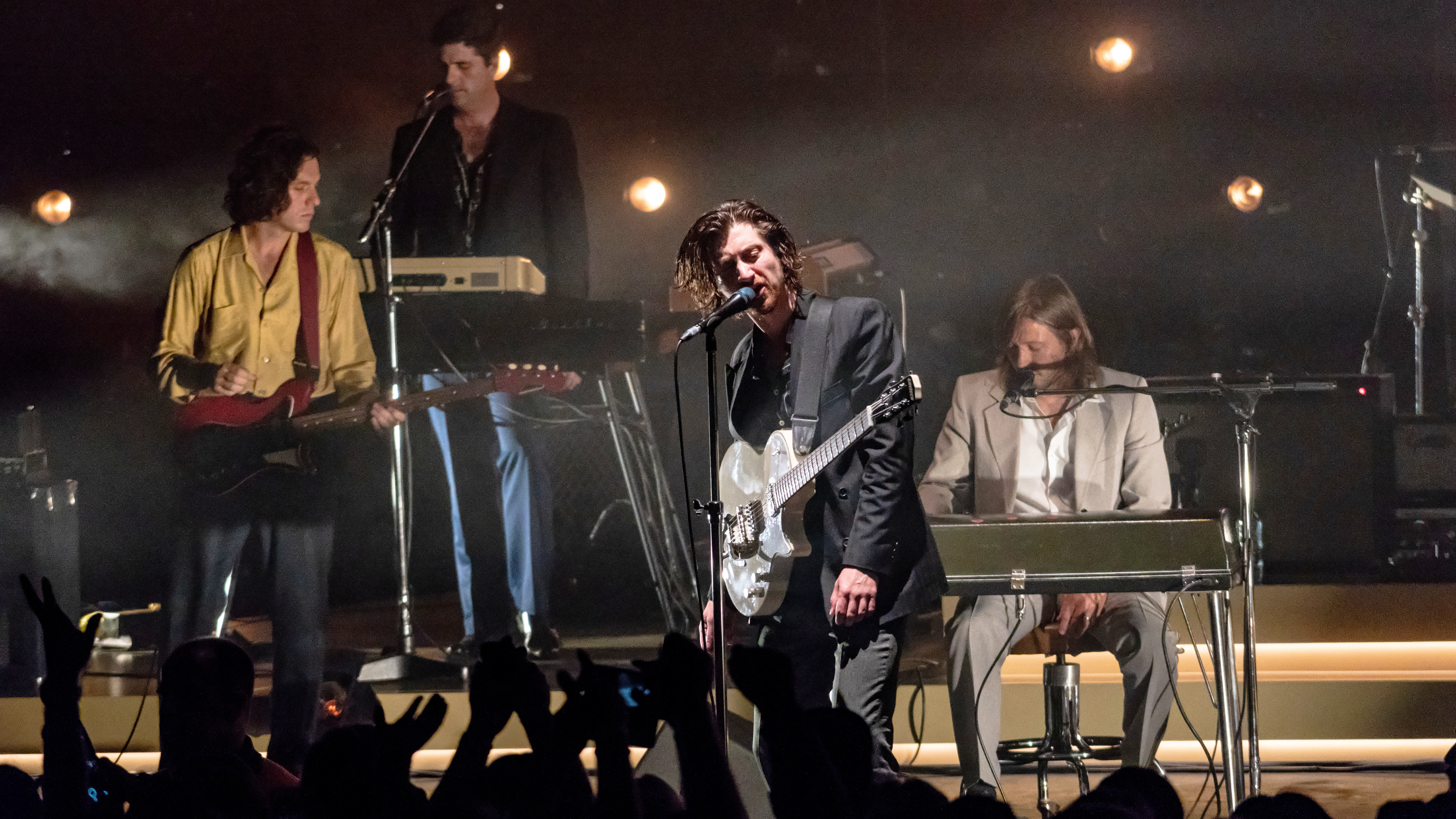
Arctic Monkeys performing in 2018. L–R: Nick O'Malley, Tyler Parkford (touring member), Alex Turner and Tom Rowley (touring member).

Arctic Monkeys are an English indie rock band who have recorded over 100 songs during their career. Formed in Sheffield in 2002, the group gained popularity in England before releasing their debut EP Five Minutes with Arctic Monkeys in 2005 on their own Bang Bang Recordings label, featuring the songs "Fake Tales of San Francisco" and "From the Ritz to the Rubble". After signing with Domino the same year, the group released their debut studio album Whatever People Say I Am, That's What I'm Not in 2006. It features songs influenced by indie rock, garage rock revival, post-punk revival, punk rock, and alternative rock, Lyrically, it analyses "the lives of young Northern England clubbers". Soon after recording the EP Who the Fuck Are Arctic Monkeys? (2006), the group released their second album Favourite Worst Nightmare in 2007. The album is noted as containing a harder and more aggressive sound than their debut, with lyrics exploring failed relationships, nostalgia and growing old.

The group's third album, Humbug, was released in 2009. Due to the influence of the album's producer, Queens of the Stone Age frontman Josh Homme, Humbug marked a change in sound for the band, showing influences of psychedelic rock, hard rock, stoner rock, and desert rock. The lyrics are also more visually abstract compared to their previous releases. For the band's fourth album Suck It and See (2011), the band explored different musical styles, including guitar pop, indie rock, and psychedelic pop. It further features slower, love-themed ballads than the fast-paced, rockier songs that typify the band's earlier sound.

After releasing the single "R U Mine?" in 2012, the group released their fifth album AM the following year. It features a wide array of influences, from blues rock to hip hop. Thematically, the album concerns frustration surrounding tainted romance, sex and loneliness. Their sixth album, Tranquility Base Hotel & Casino (2018), took on a different direction, substituting the guitar-heavy sound from their previous albums for a more complex, piano-based style of composition, psychedelic pop, lounge pop, space pop, and glam rock influences. A concept album depicting a luxury hotel at Tranquility Base, the location of the 1969 Moon landing, it is heavily influenced by works of science fiction, consumerism, fame, religion and technology, and features the perspectives of multiple unreliable narrators. Their seventh album, The Car (2022), builds upon the sound developed on Tranquility Base Hotel & Casino, albeit more accessible, featuring art rock, baroque pop and funk. Lyrically, the album refers frequently to show business, specifically the music and film industries.

== Songs ==
Key
†	Indicates single release
‡	Song not written by members of Arctic Monkeys

Name of song, songwriter(s), original release and year of release
Title	Songwriter(s)	Original release	Year	Ref.
"-" (Note: Fretwell's original is also referred to as "Untitled") (Note: Arctic Monkeys' cover is appended with "- Recorded at Electric Lady Studios, New York") (Stephen Fretwell cover)	Stephen Fretwell ‡	Spotify Singles	2018	
"2013"	Alex Turner; Jamie Cook; Nick O'Malley; Matt Helders	B-side of "Do I Wanna Know?"	2013	
"505"	Alex Turner; Jamie Cook; Nick O'Malley; Matt Helders	Favourite Worst Nightmare	2007	
"7"	Alex Turner	B-side of "When the Sun Goes Down" (12" single)	2006	
"The Afternoon's Hat"	Alex Turner; Jamie Cook; Nick O'Malley; Matt Helders	B-side of "My Propeller" (10" single)	2010	
"All My Own Stunts"	Alex Turner; Jamie Cook; Nick O'Malley; Matt Helders	Suck It and See	2011	
"American Sports"	Alex Turner	Tranquility Base Hotel & Casino	2018	
"Anyways" (Note: Credited to "the Martini Police")	Alex Turner	B-side of "Tranquility Base Hotel & Casino"	2018	
"Arabella" †	Alex Turner; Jamie Cook; Nick O'Malley; Matt Helders	AM	2013	
"Baby I'm Yours" (with The 747s) (Note: Released under the name "the Newell Octet") (Barbara Lewis cover)	Van McCoy ‡	B-side of "Leave Before the Lights Come On"	2006	
"The Bad Thing"	Alex Turner; Jamie Cook; Nick O'Malley; Matt Helders	Favourite Worst Nightmare	2007	
"Bad Woman" (with Richard Hawley) (Note: Credited to Richard Hawley & Death Ramps) (Pat Farrell and the Believers cover)	Patrick Sickafus ‡	B-side of "Teddy Picker"	2007	
"The Bakery"	Alex Turner; Jamie Cook; Nick O'Malley; Matt Helders	B-side of "Fluorescent Adolescent"	2007	
"Balaclava"	Alex Turner; Jamie Cook; Nick O'Malley; Matt Helders	Favourite Worst Nightmare	2007	
"Batphone"	Alex Turner	Tranquility Base Hotel & Casino	2018	
"Body Paint" †	Alex Turner	The Car	2022	
"Bigger Boys and Stolen Sweethearts"	Alex Turner; Jamie Cook; Andy Nicholson; Matt Helders	B-side of "I Bet You Look Good on the Dancefloor"	2004	
"Big Ideas"	Alex Turner	The Car	2022	
"Black Treacle" †	Alex Turner; Jamie Cook; Nick O'Malley; Matt Helders	Suck It and See	2011	
"The Blond-O-Sonic Shimmer Trap"	Alex Turner; Jamie Cook; Nick O'Malley; Matt Helders	B-side of "Don't Sit Down 'Cause I've Moved Your Chair" (10" single)	2011	
"Brianstorm" †	Alex Turner; Jamie Cook; Nick O'Malley; Matt Helders	Favourite Worst Nightmare	2007	
"Brick by Brick"	Alex Turner; Jamie Cook; Nick O'Malley; Matt Helders	Suck It and See	2011	
"The Car"	Alex Turner	The Car	2022	
"Catapult"	Alex Turner; Jamie Cook; Nick O'Malley; Matt Helders	B-side of "Cornerstone"	2009	
"A Certain Romance"	Alex Turner	Whatever People Say I Am, That's What I'm Not	2006	
"Chun Li's Spinning Bird Kick"	Alex Turner; Jamie Cook; Andy Nicholson; Matt Helders	B-side of "I Bet You Look Good on the Dancefloor" (CD single)	2005	
"Cigarette Smoker Fiona"	Alex Turner	Who the Fuck Are Arctic Monkeys? (EP)	2006	
"Cornerstone" †	Alex Turner; Jamie Cook; Nick O'Malley; Matt Helders	Humbug	2009	
"Crying Lightning" †	Alex Turner; Jamie Cook; Nick O'Malley; Matt Helders	Humbug	2009	
"D Is for Dangerous"	Alex Turner; Jamie Cook; Nick O'Malley; Matt Helders	Favourite Worst Nightmare	2007	
"Da Frame 2R" (Note: Also included as a bonus track on the Japanese edition of Favourite Worst Nightmare (2007).) †	Alex Turner	B-side of "Matador / Da Frame 2R"	2007	
"Dance Little Liar"	Alex Turner; Jamie Cook; Nick O'Malley; Matt Helders	Humbug	2009	
"Dancing Shoes"	Alex Turner	Whatever People Say I Am, That's What I'm Not	2006	
"Dangerous Animals"	Alex Turner; Jamie Cook; Nick O'Malley; Matt Helders	Humbug	2009	
"The Death Ramps" †	Death Ramps (Note: Alex Turner, Jamie Cook, Nick O'Malley, Matt Helders)	B-side of "The Death Ramps / Nettles"	2007	
"Despair in the Departure Lounge"	Alex Turner	Who the Fuck Are Arctic Monkeys? (EP)	2006	
"Diamonds Are Forever" (Shirley Bassey cover)	Don Black; John Barry ‡	All The Rage	2008	
"Do I Wanna Know?" †	Alex Turner; Jamie Cook; Nick O'Malley; Matt Helders	AM	2013	
"Do Me a Favour"	Alex Turner; Jamie Cook; Nick O'Malley; Matt Helders	Favourite Worst Nightmare	2007	
"Don't Forget Whose Legs You're On"	Alex Turner; Jamie Cook; Nick O'Malley; Matt Helders	B-side of "My Propeller" (10" single)	2010	
"Don't Sit Down 'Cause I've Moved Your Chair" †	Alex Turner; Jamie Cook; Nick O'Malley; Matt Helders	Suck It and See	2011	
"Electricity"	Alex Turner	B-side of "R U Mine?"	2012	
"Evil Twin"	Alex Turner; Jamie Cook; Nick O'Malley; Matt Helders	B-side of "Suck It and See"	2011	
"Fake Tales of San Francisco" (Note: Later re-recorded and released on Whatever People Say I Am, That's What I'm Not (2006))	Alex Turner; Jamie Cook; Andy Nicholson; Matt Helders	Five Minutes with Arctic Monkeys (EP)	2005	
"Fire and the Thud"	Alex Turner; Jamie Cook; Nick O'Malley; Matt Helders	Humbug	2009	
"Fireside"	Alex Turner; Jamie Cook; Nick O'Malley; Matt Helders	AM	2013	
"Fluorescent Adolescent" †	Alex Turner; Jamie Cook; Nick O'Malley; Matt Helders; Johanna Bennett	Favourite Worst Nightmare	2007	
"Four Out of Five"	Alex Turner	Tranquility Base Hotel & Casino	2018	
"Fright Lined Dining Room"	Alex Turner	B-side of "Cornerstone" (12" single)	2009	
"From the Ritz to the Rubble"	Alex Turner; Jamie Cook; Andy Nicholson; Matt Helders	Five Minutes with Arctic Monkeys (EP)	2005	
"Golden Trunks"	Alex Turner	Tranquility Base Hotel & Casino	2018	
"The Hellcat Spangled Shalalala" †	Alex Turner; Jamie Cook; Nick O'Malley; Matt Helders	Suck It and See	2011	
"Hello You"	Alex Turner	The Car	2022	
"Hold On, We're Going Home" (Drake featuring Majid Jordan cover)	Aubrey Graham; Noah Shebib; Majid Al Maskati; Jordan Ullman; Paul Jefferies ‡	BBC Radio 1's Live Lounge 2013	2013	
"I Ain't Quite Where I Think I Am"	Alex Turner	The Car	2022	
"I Bet You Look Good on the Dancefloor" †	Alex Turner; Jamie Cook; Andy Nicholson; Matt Helders	Whatever People Say I Am, That's What I'm Not	2005	
"I Haven't Got My Strange"	Alex Turner; Jamie Cook; Nick O'Malley; Matt Helders	B-side of "Crying Lightning" (10" single)	2009	
"I Wanna Be Yours"	Alex Turner; Jamie Cook; Nick O'Malley; Matt Helders; John Cooper Clarke	AM	2013	
"I Want It All"	Alex Turner; Jamie Cook; Nick O'Malley; Matt Helders	AM	2013	
"I.D.S.T."	Alex Turner; Jamie Cook; Nick O'Malley; Matt Helders	B-side of "Don't Sit Down 'Cause I've Moved Your Chair"	2011	
"If You Found This It's Probably Too Late"	Alex Turner; Jamie Cook; Nick O'Malley; Matt Helders	B-side of "Brianstorm" (CD Maxi-single)	2007	
"If You Were There, Beware"	Alex Turner; Jamie Cook; Nick O'Malley; Matt Helders	Favourite Worst Nightmare	2007	
"Jet Skis on the Moat"	Alex Turner; Tom Rowley	The Car	2022	
"The Jeweller's Hands"	Alex Turner; Jamie Cook; Nick O'Malley; Matt Helders	Humbug	2009	
"Joining the Dots"	Alex Turner; Jamie Cook; Nick O'Malley; Matt Helders	B-side of "My Propeller"	2010	
"Knee Socks"	Alex Turner; Jamie Cook; Nick O'Malley; Matt Helders	AM	2013	
"Leave Before the Lights Come On" †	Alex Turner; Jamie Cook; Andy Nicholson; Matt Helders	Non-album single	2006	
"Library Pictures"	Alex Turner; Jamie Cook; Nick O'Malley; Matt Helders	Suck It and See	2011	
"Little Illusion Machine (Wirral Riddler)" (feat. Miles Kane) (Note: Credited to Miles Kane & the Death Ramps)	Death Ramps; Miles Kane	B-side of "The Hellcat Spangled Shalalala"	2011	
"Love Is a Laserquest"	Alex Turner; Jamie Cook; Nick O'Malley; Matt Helders	Suck It and See	2011	
"Love Machine" (Girls Aloud cover)	Miranda Cooper; Brian Higgins; Tim Powell; Nick Coler; Lisa Cowling; Myra Boyle; Shawn Lee ‡	Radio 1's Live Lounge	2006	
"Mad Sounds"	Alex Turner; Jamie Cook; Nick O'Malley; Matt Helders; Alan Smyth	AM	2013	
"Mardy Bum"	Alex Turner	Whatever People Say I Am, That's What I'm Not	2006	
"Matador" †	Alex Turner; Jamie Cook; Nick O'Malley; Matt Helders	A-side of "Matador / Da Frame 2R" / Favourite Worst Nightmare	2007	
"Mr Schwartz"	Alex Turner; Tom Rowley	The Car	2022	
"My Propeller" †	Alex Turner; Jamie Cook; Nick O'Malley; Matt Helders	Humbug	2009	
"Nettles" †	Alex Turner	B-side of "The Death Ramps / Nettles"	2007	
"No Buses"	Alex Turner	Who the Fuck Are Arctic Monkeys? (EP)	2006	
"No. 1 Party Anthem"	Alex Turner; Jamie Cook; Nick O'Malley; Matt Helders	AM	2013	
"Old Yellow Bricks"	Alex Turner; Jamie Cook; Nick O'Malley; Matt Helders; Jon McClure	Favourite Worst Nightmare	2007	
"On a Mission" (Note: Katy B's original is titled "Katy on a Mission") (Katy B cover)	Katy B Benga Adejumo; Geeneus ‡	BBC Radio 1's Live Lounge 2012	2012	
"One for the Road" †	Alex Turner; Jamie Cook; Nick O'Malley; Matt Helders	AM	2013	
"One Point Perspective"	Alex Turner	Tranquility Base Hotel & Casino	2018	
"Only Ones Who Know"	Alex Turner; Jamie Cook; Nick O'Malley; Matt Helders	Favourite Worst Nightmare	2007	
"Opening Night" †	Alex Turner	Help(2)	2026	
"Perfect Sense"	Alex Turner	The Car	2022	
"Perhaps Vampires Is a Bit Strong But..."	Alex Turner	Whatever People Say I Am, That's What I'm Not	2006	
"Piledriver Waltz" (Note: Previously released by Turner on Submarine (2011). On this version, only Turner received a writing credit.)	Alex Turner; Jamie Cook; Nick O'Malley; Matt Helders	Suck It and See	2011	
"Plastic Tramp"	Alex Turner; Jamie Cook; Nick O'Malley; Matt Helders	B-side of "Fluorescent Adolescent" (CD single)	2007	
"Potion Approaching"	Alex Turner; Jamie Cook; Nick O'Malley; Matt Helders	Humbug	2009	
"Pretty Visitors"	Alex Turner; Jamie Cook; Nick O'Malley; Matt Helders	Humbug	2009	
"Put Your Dukes Up John" (The Little Flames cover)	Mat Gregory ‡	B-side of "Leave Before the Lights Come On" (CD single)	2006	
"R U Mine?" (Note: Later included on AM (2013)) †	Alex Turner; Jamie Cook; Nick O'Malley; Matt Helders	Non-album single	2012	
"Reckless Serenade"	Alex Turner; Jamie Cook; Nick O'Malley; Matt Helders	Suck It and See	2011	
"Red Light Indicates Doors Are Secured"	Alex Turner	Whatever People Say I Am, That's What I'm Not	2006	
"Red Right Hand" (Nick Cave and the Bad Seeds cover)	Mick Harvey; Nick Cave; Thomas Wydler ‡	B-side of "Crying Lightning"	2009	
"Riot Van"	Alex Turner	Whatever People Say I Am, That's What I'm Not	2006	
"Science Fiction"	Alex Turner	Tranquility Base Hotel & Casino	2018	
"Sculptures of Anything Goes"	Alex Turner; Jamie Cook	The Car	2022	
"Secret Door"	Alex Turner; Jamie Cook; Nick O'Malley; Matt Helders	Humbug	2009	
"Settle for a Draw"	Alex Turner	B-side of "When the Sun Goes Down"	2006	
"She Looks Like Fun"	Alex Turner	Tranquility Base Hotel & Casino	2018	
"She's Thunderstorms"	Alex Turner; Jamie Cook; Nick O'Malley; Matt Helders	Suck It and See	2011	
"Sketchead"	Alex Turner; Jamie Cook; Nick O'Malley; Matt Helders	B-side of "Cornerstone" (12" single)	2009	
"Snap Out of It"	Alex Turner; Jamie Cook; Nick O'Malley; Matt Helders	AM	2013	
"Star Treatment"	Alex Turner	Tranquility Base Hotel & Casino	2018	
"Stickin' to the Floor"	Alex Turner	B-side of "When the Sun Goes Down" (12" single)	2006	
"Still Take You Home"	Jamie Cook; Alex Turner	Whatever People Say I Am, That's What I'm Not	2006	
"Stop the World I Wanna Get Off with You"	Alex Turner; Jamie Cook; Nick O'Malley; Matt Helders	B-side of "Why'd You Only Call Me When You're High?"	2013	
"Suck It and See" †	Alex Turner; Jamie Cook; Nick O'Malley; Matt Helders	Suck It and See	2011	
"Teddy Picker" †	Alex Turner; Jamie Cook; Nick O'Malley; Matt Helders	Favourite Worst Nightmare	2007	
"Temptation Greets You Like Your Naughty Friend" (feat. Dizzee Rascal)	Alex Turner; Jamie Cook; Nick O'Malley; Matt Helders; Dizzee Rascal	B-side of "Brianstorm"	2007	
"That's Where You're Wrong"	Alex Turner; Jamie Cook; Nick O'Malley; Matt Helders	Suck It and See	2011	
"There'd Better Be a Mirrorball" †	Alex Turner	The Car	2022	
"This House Is a Circus"	Alex Turner; Jamie Cook; Nick O'Malley; Matt Helders	Favourite Worst Nightmare	2007	
"Too Much to Ask"	Alex Turner; Jamie Cook; Nick O'Malley; Matt Helders	B-side of "Fluorescent Adolescent"	2007	
"Tranquility Base Hotel & Casino"	Alex Turner	Tranquility Base Hotel & Casino	2018	
"The Ultracheese"	Alex Turner	Tranquility Base Hotel & Casino	2018	
"The View from the Afternoon"	Alex Turner	Whatever People Say I Am, That's What I'm Not	2006	
"What If You Were Right the First Time?"	Alex Turner; Jamie Cook; Nick O'Malley; Matt Helders	B-side of "Brianstorm" (CD Maxi-single)	2007	
"When the Sun Goes Down" †	Alex Turner	Whatever People Say I Am, That's What I'm Not	2006	
"Who the Fuck Are Arctic Monkeys?"	Alex Turner	Who the Fuck Are Arctic Monkeys? (EP)	2006	
"Why'd You Only Call Me When You're High?" †	Alex Turner; Jamie Cook; Nick O'Malley; Matt Helders	AM	2013	
"The World's First Ever Monster Truck Front Flip"	Alex Turner	Tranquility Base Hotel & Casino	2018	
"You and I" (feat. Richard Hawley)	Death Ramps; Richard Hawley	B-side of "Black Treacle"	2012	
"You Know I'm No Good" (Amy Winehouse cover)	Amy Winehouse ‡	Radio 1's Live Lounge – Volume 2	2007	
"You Probably Couldn't See for the Lights but You Were Staring Straight at Me"	Alex Turner	Whatever People Say I Am, That's What I'm Not	2006	
"You're So Dark"	Alex Turner; Jamie Cook; Nick O'Malley; Matt Helders	B-side of "One for the Road"	2013	
