= List of awards and nominations received by Arctic Monkeys =

Arctic Monkeys awards and nominations
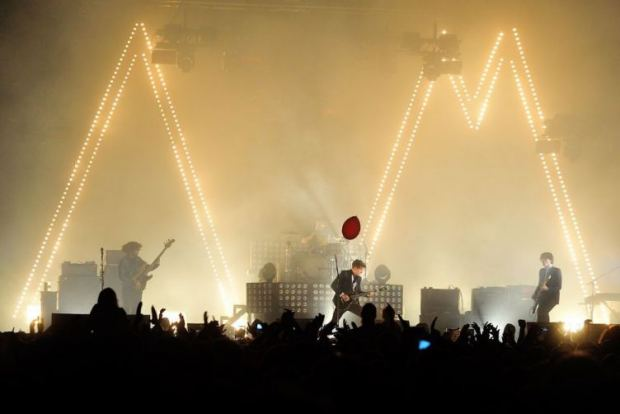
- Arctic Monkeys performing in 2013
Awards and nominations
Award	Wins	Nominations
Brit	7	12
Grammy	0	9
Ivor Novello	1	2
Meteor Music	1	3
MTV Europe	0	5
MTV VMA	0	2
NME	20	37
PLUG	1	2
Q	5	25
Mercury Prize	1	3
MOJO Awards	1	1
iHeartRadio Music Awards	0	1

Totals (Note: Certain award groups do not simply award one winner. They acknowledge several different recipients, have runners-up, and have third place. Since this is a specific recognition and is different from losing an award, runner-up mentions are considered wins in this award tally. For simplification and to avoid errors, each award in this list has been presumed to have had a prior nomination.)
- Wins: 42
- Nominations: 104

Arctic Monkeys are a British indie rock band from Sheffield, England. Formed in 2002, Arctic Monkeys currently consists of Alex Turner on lead vocals and guitar, Jamie Cook on guitar, Matt Helders on drums and backing vocals, and Nick O'Malley on bass guitar and backing vocals, a position formerly held by Andy Nicholson. The band's initial popularity came from fan-made demo tapes and online file sharing, and were heralded as one of the first acts to come to the public attention via the Internet. Commentators suggested at the time that they represented the possibility of a change in the way in which new bands are promoted and marketed. The band eventually signed to the independent record label Domino Records.

Arctic Monkeys achieved chart success with their first single "I Bet You Look Good on the Dancefloor" which reached number one in the UK Singles Chart. Their first album Whatever People Say I Am, That's What I'm Not, released on 23 January 2006, was at the time the fastest-selling debut album in British music history. It received critical acclaim, winning both the 2006 Mercury Prize and the 2007 BRIT Awards for Best British Album. The band's second album, Favourite Worst Nightmare, was released on 23 April 2007, sold over 225,000 copies in its debut week, and was nominated for the 2007 Mercury Prize. The group also picked up the award for Best British Album and Best British Group at the BRIT Awards in 2008. Overall, the band has won five BRIT Awards, including "Best British Breakthrough Act" in 2006, "Best British Album" in 2007 for Whatever People Say I Am, That's What I'm Not, and "Best British Group" in 2008. At the NME Awards in 2006, they made history by becoming the first band to win both "Best New Band" and "Best British Band" in the same night. The band has also been nominated for 9 Grammy awards. Arctic Monkeys have received 42 awards from 104 nominations.

== Brit Awards ==
The Brit Awards are the British Phonographic Industry's annual pop music awards. Arctic Monkeys have won seven awards from twelve nominations.

Year	Nominee / work	Award	Result
2006	Arctic Monkeys	British Breakthrough Act	Won
2007	Arctic Monkeys	British Group	Won
2007	Whatever People Say I Am, That's What I'm Not	British Album of the Year	Won
2008	Arctic Monkeys	British Group	Won
2008	Arctic Monkeys	British Live Act	Nominated
2008	Favourite Worst Nightmare	British Album of the Year	Won
2012	Arctic Monkeys	British Group	Nominated
2014	Arctic Monkeys	British Group	Won
2014	AM	British Album of the Year	Won
2019	Arctic Monkeys	British Group	Nominated
2023	Arctic Monkeys	British Group	Nominated
2023	Arctic Monkeys	Best Rock/Alternative Act	Nominated

== GAFFA Awards ==
=== GAFFA Awards (Denmark) ===
Delivered since 1991, the GAFFA Awards are a Danish award that rewards popular music by the magazine of the same name.

Year	Nominee / work	Award	Result	Ref.
2006	Whatever People Say I Am, That's What I'm Not	Best Foreign Album	Won	
2006	Arctic Monkeys	Best Foreign New Act	Won	
2007	Favorite Worst Nightmare	Best Foreign Album	Nominated	
2007	Arctic Monkeys	Best Foreign Band	Nominated	
2019	Arctic Monkeys	Best Foreign Band	Nominated	

=== GAFFA Awards (Norway) ===
Delivered since 2012. The GAFFA Awards are a Norwegian award that rewards popular music, awarded by the GAFFA magazine.

Year	Nominee / work	Award	Result	Ref.
2018	Arctic Monkeys	Best Foreign Band	Won	
2018	Tranquility Base Hotel & Casino	Best Foreign Album	Won	

=== GAFFA Awards (Sweden) ===
Delivered since 2010, the GAFFA Awards (Swedish: GAFFA Priset) are a Swedish award that rewards popular music awarded by the magazine of the same name.

Year	Nominee / work	Award	Result	Ref.
2019	Arctic Monkeys	Best Foreign Band	Nominated	
2019	Tranquility Base Hotel & Casino	Best Foreign Album	Nominated	

== Grammy Awards ==
The Grammy Awards are awarded annually by the National Academy of Recording Arts and Sciences of the United States of America. They have been nominated 9 times with no wins.

Year	Nominee / work	Award	Result
2007	Whatever People Say I Am, That's What I'm Not	Best Alternative Music Album	Nominated
2007	"Chun Li's Spinning Bird Kick"	Best Rock Instrumental Performance	Nominated
2015	"Do I Wanna Know?"	Best Rock Performance	Nominated
2019	"Four Out of Five"	Best Rock Performance	Nominated
2019	Tranquility Base Hotel + Casino	Best Alternative Music Album	Nominated
2023	"There'd Better Be a Mirrorball"	Best Alternative Music Performance	Nominated
2024	"Body Paint"	Best Alternative Music Performance	Nominated
2024	"Sculptures of Anything Goes"	Best Rock Performance	Nominated
2024	The Car	Best Alternative Music Album	Nominated

== iHeartRadio Music Awards ==
The IHeartRadio Music Awards is an international music awards show founded by IHeartRadio in 2014. Arctic Monkeys had a nomination.

Year	Nominee / work	Award	Result
2015	"Do I Wanna Know?"	Alternative Rock Song of the Year	Nominated

== Ivor Novello Awards ==
The Ivor Novello Awards are presented annually in London by the British Academy of Composers and Songwriters and was first introduced in 1955. Arctic Monkeys have received one award.

Year	Nominee / work	Award	Result
2006	"I Bet You Look Good on the Dancefloor"	Best Song Musically and Lyrically	Nominated
2007	"When the Sun Goes Down"	Best Song Musically and Lyrically	Nominated
2007	Whatever People Say I Am, That's What I'm Not	Album Award	Won
2013	AM	Album Award	Nominated
2019	"Four Out of Five"	Best Song Musically and Lyrically	Nominated
2023	The Car	Best Album	Nominated

== Mercury Prize ==
The Mercury Prize is a highly prestigious annual music prize awarded for the best album from the United Kingdom and Ireland. Nominations are chosen by a panel of musicians, music executives, journalists and other figures in the music industry in the UK and Ireland.

Arctic Monkeys won the 2006 Mercury Prize with their debut album Whatever People Say I Am, That's What I'm Not. In 2007, their second album Favourite Worst Nightmare received a nomination, and the band was nominated once again in 2013 for their fifth album AM. Their sixth album Tranquility Base Hotel & Casino was nominated for the award in 2018. Their seventh album The Car was shortlisted for the award in 2023.

Year	Nominee / work	Award	Result
2006	Whatever People Say I Am, That's What I'm Not	Album of the Year	Won
2007	Favourite Worst Nightmare	Album of the Year	Nominated
2013	AM	Album of the Year	Nominated
2018	Tranquility Base Hotel & Casino	Album of the Year	Nominated
2023	The Car	Album of the Year	Nominated

== Meteor Music Awards ==
The Meteor Music Awards are distributed by MCD Productions and are the national music awards of Ireland. Arctic Monkeys have won one award from three nominations.

Year	Nominee / work	Award	Result
2007	Arctic Monkeys	Best International Band	Nominated
2007	Arctic Monkeys	Best Live Performance	Nominated
2007	Whatever People Say I Am, That's What I'm Not	Best International Album	Won

== MOJO Awards ==
The MOJO Awards are the UK's annual music awards run by music magazine, MOJO. To date, Arctic Monkeys has won one award.

Year	Nominee / work	Award	Result
2011	Suck It And See	Best Album	Won

== MTV Europe Music Awards ==
The MTV Europe Music Awards were established in 1994 by MTV Europe to celebrate the most popular music videos in Europe. Arctic Monkeys had five nominations.

Year	Nominated work	Award	Result
2011	Arctic Monkeys	Best Alternative	Nominated
2012	Arctic Monkeys	Best World Stage Performance	Nominated
2012	Arctic Monkeys	Best Alternative	Nominated
2013	Arctic Monkeys	Best Alternative	Nominated
2014	Arctic Monkeys	Best Rock	Nominated

== MTV Video Music Awards ==
The MTV Video Music Awards is an annual awards ceremony established in 1984 by MTV. Arctic Monkeys have received two nominations.

Year	Nominee / work	Award	Result
2014	"Do I Wanna Know?"	Best Rock Video	Nominated
2015	"Why'd You Only Call Me When You're High?"	Best Rock Video	Nominated

== Music Video Production Awards ==
The MVPA Awards are annually presented by a Los Angeles-based music trade organization to honor the year's best music videos.

Year	Nominee / work	Award	Result
2006	"The View from the Afternoon"	Best International Video	Nominated

== NME Awards ==
Founded by the music magazine NME, the NME Awards are awarded annually. Arctic Monkeys have won 19 awards from 37 nominations.

Year	Nominee / work	Award	Result
2006	Arctic Monkeys	Best New Band	Won
2006	Arctic Monkeys	Best British Band	Won
2006	Arctic Monkeys	Best Live Band	Nominated
2006	Whatever People Say I Am, That's What I'm Not	Album of the Year	Nominated
2006	"I Bet You Look Good on the Dancefloor"	Best Track	Won
2007	Whatever People Say I Am, That's What I'm Not	Best Album	Won
2007	Scummy Man	Best Music DVD	Won
2008	Arctic Monkeys	Best British Band	Won
2008	Arctic Monkeys	Best Live Band	Nominated
2008	Favourite Worst Nightmare	Best Album	Won
2008	"Fluorescent Adolescent"	Best Track	Won
2008	"Teddy Picker"	Best Music Video	Nominated
USA	Favourite Worst Nightmare	Best International Album	Won
2009	"Arctic Monkeys at The Apollo"	Best Music DVD	Won
2010	Arctic Monkeys	Best Band	Nominated
2010	Arctic Monkeys	Best Live Band	Won
2010	Arctic Monkeys	Giving It Back Fan Award	Nominated
2010	Humbug	Best Album	Nominated
2010	"Crying Lightning"	Best Track	Nominated
2010	"Cornerstone"	Best Video	Nominated
2010	Alex Turner	Hero of the Year	Nominated
2012	Arctic Monkeys	Best Band	Nominated
2012	Arctic Monkeys	Best Live Band	Won
2012	Arctic Monkeys	Most Dedicated Fans	Nominated
2012	Suck It And See	Best Album	Nominated
2012	Suck It And See	Best Album Artwork	Nominated
2012	"The Hellcat Spangled Shalalala"	Best Track	Nominated
2012	"Suck It and See"	Best Video	Nominated
2012	Alex Turner	Hero of the Year	Nominated
2014	Arctic Monkeys	Best British Band	Won
2014	Arctic Monkeys	Best Live Band	Won
2014	Arctic Monkeys	Best Fan Community	Won
2014	AM	Best Album	Won
2014	"R U Mine?"	Best Track	Won
2014	"Why'd You Only Call Me When You're High?"	Best Music Video	Nominated
2014	Alex Turner	Hero of the Year	Won
2015	Alex Turner	Hero of the Year	Won

== PLUG Awards ==
The PLUG Awards are given in support of indie music. Arctic Monkeys have won one award from two nominations.

Year	Nominee / work	Award	Result
2007	Arctic Monkeys	New Artist of the Year	Won
2007	Arctic Monkeys	Artist of the Year	Nominated
2007	"I Bet You Look Good on the Dancefloor"	Song of the Year	Nominated

== Q Awards ==
The Q Awards are hosted annually by the music magazine Q. Arctic Monkeys have won five awards from sixteen nominations.

Year	Nominee / work	Award	Result
2006	Arctic Monkeys	Best Live Act	Nominated
2006	Arctic Monkeys	Best New Act	Nominated
2006	Arctic Monkeys	People's Choice Award	Won
2006	Whatever People Say I Am, That's What I'm Not	Best Album	Won
2006	"I Bet You Look Good on the Dancefloor"	Best Track	Nominated
2007	Arctic Monkeys	Best Act in the World Today	Won
2007	Arctic Monkeys	Best Live Act	Nominated
2007	Favourite Worst Nightmare	Best Album	Nominated
2009	Arctic Monkeys	Best Act in the World Today	Nominated
2009	Arctic Monkeys	Best Live Act	Won
2009	Humbug	Best Album	Nominated
2009	"Crying Lightning"	Best Track	Nominated
2011	Arctic Monkeys	Best Act in the World Today	Nominated
2011	Arctic Monkeys	Greatest Act of the Last 25 Years	Nominated
2011	Suck It and See	Best Album	Nominated
2011	"Don't Sit Down 'Cause I've Moved Your Chair"	Best Track	Nominated
2012	"R U Mine?"	Best Video	Nominated
2013	"Do I Wanna Know?"	Best Track	Won
2013	Arctic Monkeys	Best Live Act	Nominated
2013	Arctic Monkeys	Best Act in the World Today	Nominated
2014	"Arabella"	Best Video	Nominated
2014	Arctic Monkeys	Best Live Act	Nominated
2014	Arctic Monkeys	Best Act in the World Today	Nominated
2018	Tranquility Base Hotel & Casino	Best Album	Nominated
2018	Arctic Monkeys	Best Act in the World Today	Nominated

== Teen Choice Awards ==
The Teen Choice Awards were established in 1999 to honor the year's biggest achievements in music, movies, sports and television, being voted by young people aged between 13 and 19.

Year	Nominee / work	Award	Result
2006	Arctic Monkeys	Choice Music: Rock Group	Nominated
