= List of Arctic Monkeys concert tours =

Arctic Monkeys are a four-piece indie rock band from Sheffield, England. Since signing for Domino Records in 2005, the band have gained popularity in many parts of the world, and have gradually progressed to playing larger venues. Following the release of "I Bet You Look Good on the Dancefloor" in October 2005, the band had a near-continuous touring schedule that culminated with performances at the Reading and Leeds Festivals. Following the release of their album, Favourite Worst Nightmare, on 23 April 2007, the band began a series of tours that included a headline appearance at the Glastonbury Festival as well as hosting their own "mini-festival" at Lancashire County Cricket Ground.

== Whatever People Say I Am, That's What I'm Not ==
Whatever People Say I Am, That's What I'm Not Tour
- World tour by Arctic Monkeys
- Associated album: Whatever People Say I Am, That's What I'm Not
- Start date: 2 October 2005
- End date: 27 August 2006
- No. of shows: 153

Arctic Monkeys concert chronology
- Whatever People Say I Am, That's What I'm Not Tour (2005–06); Favourite Worst Nightmare Tour (2007)

=== Setlist ===
1. Riot Van (occasionally played from March to August 2006)
2. The View From The Afternoon
3. You Probably Couldn't See for the Lights But You Were Staring Straight At Me
4. Who The Fuck Are Arctic Monkeys? (occasionally played from January to August 2006)
5. Cigarette Smoker Fiona (occasionally played from March to August 2006)
6. No Buses (played on 25, 26 March 2006, 2 April 2006)
7. Still Take You Home
8. I Bet You Look Good On The Dancefloor
9. Despair in the Departure Lounge (played on 13 March 2006)
10. Perhaps Vampires Is a Bit Strong But...
11. Bigger Boys and Stolen Sweethearts (very rarely played)
12. Dancing Shoes
13. From The Ritz to the Rubble
14. When the Sun Goes Dow
15. Leave Before The Lights Come On (played on 22 October 2005, occasionally played from January to August 2006)
16. Red Light Indicates Doors Are Secured (occasionally played from October 2005 to August 2006)
17. Mardy Bum
18. Fake Tales of San Francisco
19. A Certain Romance

=== Autumn 2005 debut world tour ===
The Monkeys' debut world tour began in Liverpool on 2 October 2005. Beginning with performances across Britain, backed mainly by the fellow Sheffield band Milburn, the tour included gigs in The Netherlands, Belgium, France, Germany, Canada and the United States. Although originally scheduled to finish in Tokyo, Japan, on 23 November, further dates were subsequently added in Spain, Sweden and Denmark for December 2005.

The UK leg of the tour coincided with the release of the band's debut single, "I Bet You Look Good on the Dancefloor", which went straight to UK Number One. The furore surrounding the band saw every show selling out and some venues having to be upgraded to handle the demand. Dates at popular locales were also added later on. Tickets with a face value of £7 were being resold on eBay for over £100 a pair. The band's home gig in Sheffield had a second night added due to floor space being required for film crews.

=== NME Awards Tour ===
January and February 2006 saw the band playing alongside Maxïmo Park, We Are Scientists and Mystery Jets on the NME Awards tour. The tour consisted of a series of gigs across the UK and Ireland, including Glasgow, London, Leeds, Manchester, Dublin, Edinburgh, Cardiff and the band's home town Sheffield. Unusually, the band swapped slots with Maxïmo Park for one night only, making them the headliners at the Sheffield gig for obvious reasons.

=== April 2006 UK tour ===
On 30 January 2006, James Sheriff announced details of the Monkeys' UK tour in April 2006. The tour began at the Rock City in Nottingham on 13 April, and consisted of 12 gigs around the UK, culminating on 27 April at Brixton Academy in London. Advance tickets to all 12 shows were made available on the Monkeys' web-site at 6pm that night, and sold out within 1 hour.

Tickets were put on general release at 6pm on 2 February, available online, by phone or box office. All 12 gigs were sold out within 10 minutes, with queuing at some venues beginning in the early hours of the morning.

=== May 2006 Europe tour ===
In May 2006 the band toured several venues in Continental Europe, beginning on 2 May in Paris and including Cologne, Amsterdam, Munich, Milan, Marseille, Barcelona and Madrid. The tour culminated in Lisbon, which would be subsequently turn out to be Andy Nicholson's last show before leaving the band.

=== June 2006 North American tour ===
June 2006 saw the band playing significantly bigger venues than their initial visit in March 2006. Andy Nicholson, whose departure from the band was announced upon the band's return to the UK, was replaced by Nick O'Malley during the tour. Supported by We Are Scientists, the band have received critical acclaim from the American media – the hype surrounding them "proven to exist for good reason" who have acknowledged that "the hype surrounding the band is there for a reason". Cities visited include Vancouver, San Diego, Los Angeles, Houston, Atlanta, Boston, New York City, Montreal, and Toronto, among others. Domino Records USA created a special site, The Riot Van, for information and interaction with the tour.

=== July–August 2006 Australasia tour ===
After announcing their first tour of Australasia in March 2006, the band performed in Auckland on 28 July. After gigs in Perth, Adelaide, Melbourne and Brisbane supported by Australian band The Grates, the Australian leg of the tour culminated in the Enmore Theatre in Sydney on 9 August.

=== Festivals 2006 ===
The band's return trip to the UK from Australia included stops in Japan to play at the annual Summer Sonic Festival in Tokyo and Osaka on 12 and 13 August respectively; as well as performances at the Frequency Festival in Salzburg, Austria; Belgium's Werchter and Pukkelpop festival and the Lowlands Festival of the Netherlands on the 18–20 August. Following near-continuous touring since Autumn 2005, the band's schedule came to an end following their performances at the Reading and Leeds Festivals on the last weekend of August. The band's spectacular rise up the billing from the small Carling Tent up to penultimate on the Main stage in the space of a year was noted by many reviews, and the band delivered "a set that was typically low on spectacle but high on musical fire, [as] they confidently made the festival their own". The Leeds leg of the festival saw the original band members re-united following a backstage appearance by Andy Nicholson. Earlier in the summer Arctic Monkeys had taken the main stage at Oxegen by storm when they made an appearance on the rainy, windswept Saturday of the festival. The following evening at T in the Park, Kinross in Scotland they played a 60-minute set on the main stage before The Strokes took to the stage.

== Favourite Worst Nightmare ==
=== April 2007 UK Fan Club Tour ===
The Arctic Monkeys played an 11 date UK tour exclusively for fan club members. During this tour the band was supported by The Little Flames, Gas Club and Reverend And The Makers.

=== June Glastonbury Warm Up Shows ===
The band performed two dates at Dublin's Malahide Castle on 16 and 17 June followed by two dates at Cardiff International Arena on 19 June 2007 and 20 June 2007. Support came from Supergrass, The Coral and Delorentos in Dublin while the Cardiff support acts were close friends of the band Reverend and the Makers and The Rascals.

=== 2007 festivals ===
Co-inciding with the release of their second album, Favourite Worst Nightmare, and new single "Brianstorm" in April 2007, the band announced several tours and festival appearances for the summer of 2007. In addition, the band headlined the Glastonbury Festival in June and the first ever Friday at T in the Park in July.

=== Old Trafford Cricket Ground ===
On Saturday 28 July and Sunday 29 July 2007 the band played two sell out shows at the 55,000 capacity Lancashire County Cricket Club in Manchester. Billed as being the group's own 'mini-festivals' both date saw support sets for Supergrass, The Coral, Amy Winehouse and Japanese Beatles tribute act The Parrots. The shows were hailed as 'the gigs of a generation' by NME and were even compared to Oasis' record-breaking shows at Knebworth House in 1996 and The Stone Roses' one-off gig at Spike Island in 1990. Despite the acclaim the gigs were not without their faults. On the Saturday, sound problems occurred during 'Balaclava' forcing the band to stop playing halfway through. Whilst on the Sunday the band had to stop performing twice during 'Still Take You Home' and 'Dancing Shoes' due to crushing at the front of the barriers. Despite these minor fluctuations, it is clear that the LCCG concerts cemented Arctic Monkeys' status as the defining band of their generation, as Oasis and the Stone Roses had done before them.

=== June 2007 US/Canadian tour ===
The band began their first long North American tour in June 2007, playing headlining gigs in San Francisco, Los Angeles, Chicago, Toronto, Montreal, Boston, New York City, Philadelphia and Washington, D.C., amongst others. The band was one of three Sheffield-based bands playing at the South by Southwest Festival in Austin, Texas. In addition to these, the band was the opening act for Oasis show at the 19,800-capacity Air Canada Centre in Toronto.

Also 28 June 2007 they played in the Hamburg Stadtpark with The Coral Opening for them

=== August 2007 Oceania and Asia mini tour ===
Arctic Monkeys played at Byron Bay's music festival Splendour in the Grass.

They played the Summer Sonic Festival, split between Osaka and Tokyo, Japan.

=== October 2007 South America mini tour ===
The band performed in Buenos Aires, Argentina at Luna Park's stadium. The band also played in three cities of Brazil: Rio de Janeiro, São Paulo and Curitiba

=== November/December 2007 UK tour ===
In December, Arctic Monkeys made a welcome return to Britain, playing a relatively small tour of large venues across the nation. They played Alexandra Palace in London twice, G-Mex in Manchester twice and finally the AECC in Aberdeen twice.

The tour was supported by The Rascals and The Horrors, the latter were the subject of much controversy amongst Arctic Monkeys fans and the division of opinion resulted in an assortment of missiles such as bottles and plastic cutlery being thrown at the Horrors; particularly at the two G Mex dates in Manchester. The G Mex dates were generally perceived as to be the worst nights of the tour due to the level of hostility shown towards The Horrors and the audience being subject to a large amount of thuggish behaviour from drunken revellers.

Arctic Monkeys played relatively well however on both G-Mex nights, Turner, at one point on the first night insulted the crowd over their treatment of The Horrors – calling them "wankers" on the first night and "dickheads" on the second. The apathy felt between the crowd and Arctic Monkeys at the two G Mex dates was mostly resolved by the end of the second night, Turner remarking that the crowd of the second night were "a lot better" than the crowd the night before.

To create a DVD, the band played a secret gig the week after at the Apollo. The DVD is entitled Arctic Monkeys Live at the Apollo and was also released in cinema.

== Humbug ==
=== Big Day Out 2009 ===
The band performed on all six dates of the 2009 Big Day Out throughout Australia and New Zealand. They also performed sideshows before the East Coast legs of the Big Day Out. The setlists usually included four titles from their upcoming third album and a cover of Nick Cave's "Red Right Hand", plus many titles from their first two albums.

=== Leeds and Reading Festivals 2009 ===
On 30 March 2009, the band announced on their website that they would be headlining at the Reading and Leeds Festivals on bank-holiday weekend in August stating 'Arctic Monkeys are pleased to announce that they will be headlining the Reading & Leeds Festivals 2009. The band will headline the Leeds Festival on 28 August and Reading Festival on 29 August.'

The band also played a warm-up to the Reading and Leeds Festivals at Brixton Academy, when the newly formed super group Them Crooked Vultures supported them.

=== Osheaga Festival 2009 ===
It was announced that the band were billed to perform at the Osheaga Festival in Montreal, performing alongside headliners Beastie Boys and Coldplay. The festival also included performances by The Roots, Girl Talk, The Ting Tings and Jason Mraz, amongst others.

=== Europe and UK Arena Tour 2009 ===
Kicking off in Antwerp's Lotto Arena on 3 November 2009, Arctic Monkeys returned to tour a section of Europe and then a welcome return to the UK to play some of their biggest shows to date in a selection of major Arena's across Britain. Following Antwerp (Belgium), they played two dates at Paris' Le Zénith, Berlin Arena and two dates at the Heineken Music Hall in Amsterdam before heading to the UK.

On 13 November 2009 they played at Liverpool Echo Arena, Sheffield Arena, Newcastle's Metro Arena, and then two dates at Wembley Arena. They then played at Birmingham's NIA Arena before playing their biggest show of the tour at the MEN Arena in Manchester. The English part to the tour then concluded on 22 November in Nottingham at the Trent FM Arena. Arctic Monkeys then headed to Scotland to play at the Glasgow SECC Arena. This gig was criticised by many primarily due to the unusually rowdy audience, and Arctic Monkeys had to temporarily stop playing twice during the concert due to the crowd throwing things and generally becoming too violent.

Arctic Monkeys then travelled to The Odyssey in Belfast, before concluding their tour on 26 November at The O2.

== Suck It and See ==
Suck It and See Tour
- Tour by Arctic Monkeys
- Associated album: Suck It and See
- Start date: 5 May 2011
- End date: 23 June 2012

Arctic Monkeys concert chronology
- Humbug Tour (2009–10); Suck It and See Tour (2011–12); AM Tour (2013–14)

=== Setlist ===
1. Library Pictures
2. Brianstorm
3. Don't Sit Down 'Cause I've Moved Your Chair
4. This House is a Circus
5. Still Take You Home
6. Teddy Picker
7. Potion Approaching (occasionally played from May to August 2011)
8. Pretty Visitors
9. The View From the Afternoon
10. Crying Lightning
11. I Bet You Look Good on the Dancefloor
12. Cornerstone (dropped after 1 July 2011)
13. Dance Little Liar (played from 28 October to 9 November 2011)
14. Little Illusion Machine (Wirral Riddler) (played from 2 January to 8 February 2012)
15. The Hellcat Spangled Shalalala
16. Mardy Bum (occasionally played from June to November 2011)
17. R U Mine? (added on 3 March 2012)
18. She's Thunderstorms
19. Brick by Brick
20. Black Treacle (occasionally played from May 2011 to February 2012)
21. All My Own Stunts (occasionally played from May to October 2011)
22. Love Is a Laserquest (played on 5, 7 October 2011)
23. Evil Twin
24. If You Were There, Beware
25. Do Me a Favour
26. When The Sun Goes Down
27. 505 (occasionally played after June 2011)
28. That's Where You're Wrong (occasionally played from May 2011 to June 2012) [ENCORE]
29. Reckless Serenade (played on 17, 18 May 2011, 3, 16, 17, 20, 29 June 2011, 28 September 2011) [ENCORE]
30. You & I (played on 2 February 2012) [ENCORE]
31. From the Ritz to the Rubble (played on 5 May 2011) [ENCORE]
32. Fluorescent Adolescent [ENCORE]
33. A Certain Romance (played on 10, 11 June 2011) [ENCORE]
34. Suck It and See [ENCORE]

=== Don Valley Bowl 2011 ===
Across 10 and 11 June 2011 the band played two 'homecoming' concerts at Don Valley Bowl, Sheffield. Playing to approximately 20,000 people across the two days, the shows took place in a festival style tent to commemorate the release of the band's fourth studio album Suck It And See, which had been released the previous Monday (6 June). On Friday 10 June, the opening slot was occupied by local band Dead Sons, with London quartet The Vaccines taking the penultimate support slot, and Liverpudlian solo artist and friend of Alex Turner Miles Kane being the main support act. On 11 June local band Mabel Love opened the show, with female singer-songwriter Anna Calvi performing in the second support slot and Miles Kane being the final support act again. It is believed that Alex Turner's father David Turner was in attendance, along with Alex's then-girlfriend Alexa Chung. It was also rumoured that Reverend and the Makers' frontman Jon McClure also made an appearance at the show on Saturday.

Both dates were praised for their ticketing systems, by which attendees had to produce the card with which the tickets were purchased in order to gain access into the venue. The concert merchandise also attracted interest from local media, specifically a T-shirt that parodied the Sheffield City Council logo.

On both nights, Miles Kane returned to the stage to perform Favourite Worst Nightmare track "505" with Arctic Monkeys. The band entered the stage on both nights to Hot Chocolate's "You Sexy Thing", likely in reference to Sheffield film The Full Monty, and also performed less well-known tracks from their earlier back catalogue such as "The View From The Afternoon", "A Certain Romance" and an acoustic performance of "Mardy Bum", the latter which had not previously been performed live since 2007.

=== November Tour 2011 ===
On 9 June 2011, the band announced a nationwide UK arena tour to promote Suck It And See across October and November 2011. The tour started at Nottingham's Capital FM Arena on 28 October, followed by dates at London's O2 Arena, Cardiff Motorpoint Arena, Manchester MEN Arena, Birmingham LG Arena, Newcastle Metro Radio Arena, Aberdeen AECC and Glasgow SECC (Hall 4) before finishing at Liverpool's Echo Arena on 9 November 2011, with the support act throughout being The Vaccines. The Smith Westerns were originally scheduled to perform in a second support slot, but later cancelled due to "family medical issues".
