= At the Apollo =

2008 live album by Arctic Monkeys

Live album by Arctic Monkeys
- Released: 3 November 2008
- Recorded: 17 December 2007
- Venue: Manchester Apollo
- Genre: Post-punk revival; indie rock; garage rock revival
- Length: 35:59
- Label: Domino

Arctic Monkeys chronology
Favourite Worst Nightmare (2007)	At the Apollo (2008)	Humbug (2009)

Professional ratings
Review scores
Source	Rating
AllMusic	3/5 stars
PopMatters	4/10 stars
NME	8/10
Uncut	4/5 stars
Contactmusic	9/10
Pitchfork	4.5/10

At the Apollo is a live album and video release by English rock band Arctic Monkeys of the final concert of their 2007 world-tour, filmed in Manchester, England.

It was filmed on super 16mm film and in surround-sound. It was directed by Richard Ayoade and photographed by cinematographer Danny Cohen (This Is England). It was edited by Nick Fenton (Heima, All Tomorrow's Parties), and produced by Diarmid Scrimshaw (Dog Altogether, Tyrannosaur).

It has been awarded best music DVD 2009 by the NME. The music played in introduction credits was written by Bruno Nicolai, entitled 'Servizio fotografico' from the film The Red Queen Kills Seven Times starring Barbara Bouchet.

The film premiered on UK television on the music channel 4Music on 19 February 2009.

The DVD features a 'Multi Angle Camera View' of drummer Matt Helders.

== DVD track listing ==
1. "Brianstorm"
2. "This House Is a Circus"
3. "Teddy Picker"
4. "I Bet You Look Good on the Dancefloor"
5. "Dancing Shoes"
6. "From the Ritz to the Rubble"
7. "Fake Tales of San Francisco"
8. "When the Sun Goes Down"
9. "Nettles"
10. "D Is for Dangerous"
11. "Leave Before the Lights Come On"
12. "Fluorescent Adolescent"
13. "Still Take You Home"
14. "Da Frame 2R"
15. "Plastic Tramp" (with Miles Kane)
16. "505" (with Miles Kane)
17. "Do Me a Favour"
18. "A Certain Romance"
19. "The View from the Afternoon"
20. "If You Were There, Beware"

Bonus tracks

1. "Balaclava"
2. "Bad Woman" (feat. Richard Hawley)

=== LP track listing ===
Live In Texas - 7 June 2006

Side 1

1. Riot Van
2. The View From The Afternoon
3. Still Take You Home
4. You Probably Couldn't See For The Lights But You Were Staring Straight At Me
5. Cigarette Smoker Fiona

Side 2

1. Perhaps Vampires Is A Bit Strong But...
2. Dancing Shoes
3. I Bet You Look Good On The Dancefloor
4. When The Sun Goes Down
5. A Certain Romance

== Personnel ==
Arctic Monkeys

- Alex Turner – lead vocals (all except Bad Woman), backing vocals ("Bad Woman"), guitar (1–14, 17–20, "Balaclava", "Bad Woman"), keyboards (16)
- Jamie Cook – guitar, backing vocals (1, 4, 6–8, 13, 19)
- Nick O'Malley – bass guitar, backing vocals (1–2, 7–8, 10–12, 14–15, 19, "Balaclava", "Bad Woman")
- Matt Helders – drums, backing vocals (1–7, 10–15, 19, "Balaclava")

Guest musicians

- Miles Kane – guitar (15–16)
- Richard Hawley – lead vocals, tambourine ("Bad Woman")
