= Suck It and See (disambiguation) =

Suck It and See is a 2011 album by the Arctic Monkeys.

Suck It and See may also refer to:

- Suck It and See (compilation album), 1999 album produced by Howie B
- "Suck It and See" (song), 2011 Arctic Monkeys song
- Suck It and See Tour, 2011 Arctic Monkeys tour
- "Suck It and See," song by Andy Scott, B-side to "Let Her Dance" 1984
- "Suck It and See," song by Glen Matlock, B-side to "My Little Philistine", 1996
- "Suck It and See," song by Grim Reaper from Rock You to Hell and The Best of Grim Reaper
