= Black Treacle =

Single by Arctic Monkeys

from the album Suck It and See
- B-side: "You and I"
- Released: 23 January 2012
- Studio: Sound City, Los Angeles
- Length: 3:35
- Label: Domino
- Composers: Jamie Cook; Matt Helders; Nick O'Malley; Alex Turner
- Lyricist: Alex Turner
- Producer: James Ford

Arctic Monkeys singles chronology
| "Suck It and See" (2011) | "Black Treacle" (2012) | "R U Mine?" (2012) |

Music video
- "Black Treacle" on YouTube

"Black Treacle" is a song by the English indie rock band Arctic Monkeys, released as the fourth single from their fourth studio album Suck It and See and was released as a digital download and a 7" vinyl on 23 January 2012. The single was limited to only 1,500 copies.

The 7" vinyl features only one B-side titled "You and I" and is credited to Richard Hawley and The Death Ramps. The Death Ramps is a pseudonym previously adopted by the band when they released "The Hellcat Spangled Shalalala" single and a limited edition vinyl with "Teddy Picker" B-sides "Nettles" and "The Death Ramps" back in 2007.

A promo video was made for "You and I" which consists of footage while recording the song at the studio and of the band riding motorbikes on the peaks outside Sheffield near Dore. The music video for the single premiered on 5 January 2012 and for "You and I" premiered on 23 January 2012 on YouTube.

== Writing ==
The song was one of the last written during the London sessions, before recording took place. About the lyrics Alex Turner told NME: "I watched a couple of westerns when we were doing this, like Butch Cassidy And The Sundance Kid, which gets a reference in there. I also just wanted to put 'belly-button piercings' in a tune, I thought that would be good. I'd kind of wanted to do it for a couple of weeks and then managed to fit it in there. Why? I'd not thought about them for a while and they came on my radar somehow. And then I thought about this thing of them and the stars being juxtaposed."

== Music video ==
The music video for "Black Treacle" was released on YouTube on 5 January 2012. It was filmed in Sheffield and Los Angeles, and directed by Focus Creeps. Is part of a trilogy inspired by a story told on a documentary on the life of musician Ian "Lemmy" Kilmister. It serves as a sequel to "Suck It and See" and stars drummer Matt Helders as the biker, now an escaped convict, looking to reunite and marry his fiancée (Breana McDow). While in prison the biker collaborates with the police and wears a wire. After escaping he recovers a knife he had hidden in the desert, and uses it to steal clothes and a car from a bystander. He picks up a prostitute and gets fellow biker (frontman Alex Turner) to drive them around. The next day they return to the desert where his fiancée, wearing a wedding dress, is waiting for him.

On the video, Focus Creeps said: "The ‘Black Treacle’ video is a compilation of the darker outtakes of ‘Suck It & See’. In the desert, the bright rays of the sun cast a long dark shadow. It's a prequel where laws get broke, and a sequel where hearts get broke. On the one hand, the song kind of says, no matter how low things go, you can always dream, and on the other hand it's a video that kind of shows - kids, don't try this at home." The video was compared to Breaking Bad and Fear and Loathing in Las Vegas.

== Track listing ==
All tracks are written by Arctic Monkeys and The Death Ramps (Richard Hawley).

7" and digital download
| No. | Title | Length |
|---|---|---|
| 1. | "Black Treacle" | 3:35 |
| 2. | "You and I" (Cook, Hawley, Helders, O'Malley, Turner) | 3:26 |

== Personnel ==
Arctic Monkeys

- Alex Turner – lead vocals, guitar, backing vocals (track two)
- Jamie Cook – guitar
- Nick O'Malley – bass, backing vocals
- Matt Helders – drums, backing vocals

Additional personnel

- Richard Hawley – lead vocals, guitar (track two)

== Charts ==
| Chart (2011–12) | Peak position |
|---|---|
| UK Singles (OCC) | 173 |
| UK Indie (OCC) | 21 |
| Belgium (Ultratop 50 Flanders) | 25 |
| Belgium (Ultratop 50 Wallonia) | 38 |

== Certifications ==
| Region | Certification | Certified units/sales |
|---|---|---|
| United Kingdom (BPI) | Silver | 200,000^{‡} |
^{‡} Sales+streaming figures based on certification alone.
