= Death Ramps =

Alias for the band Arctic Monkeys

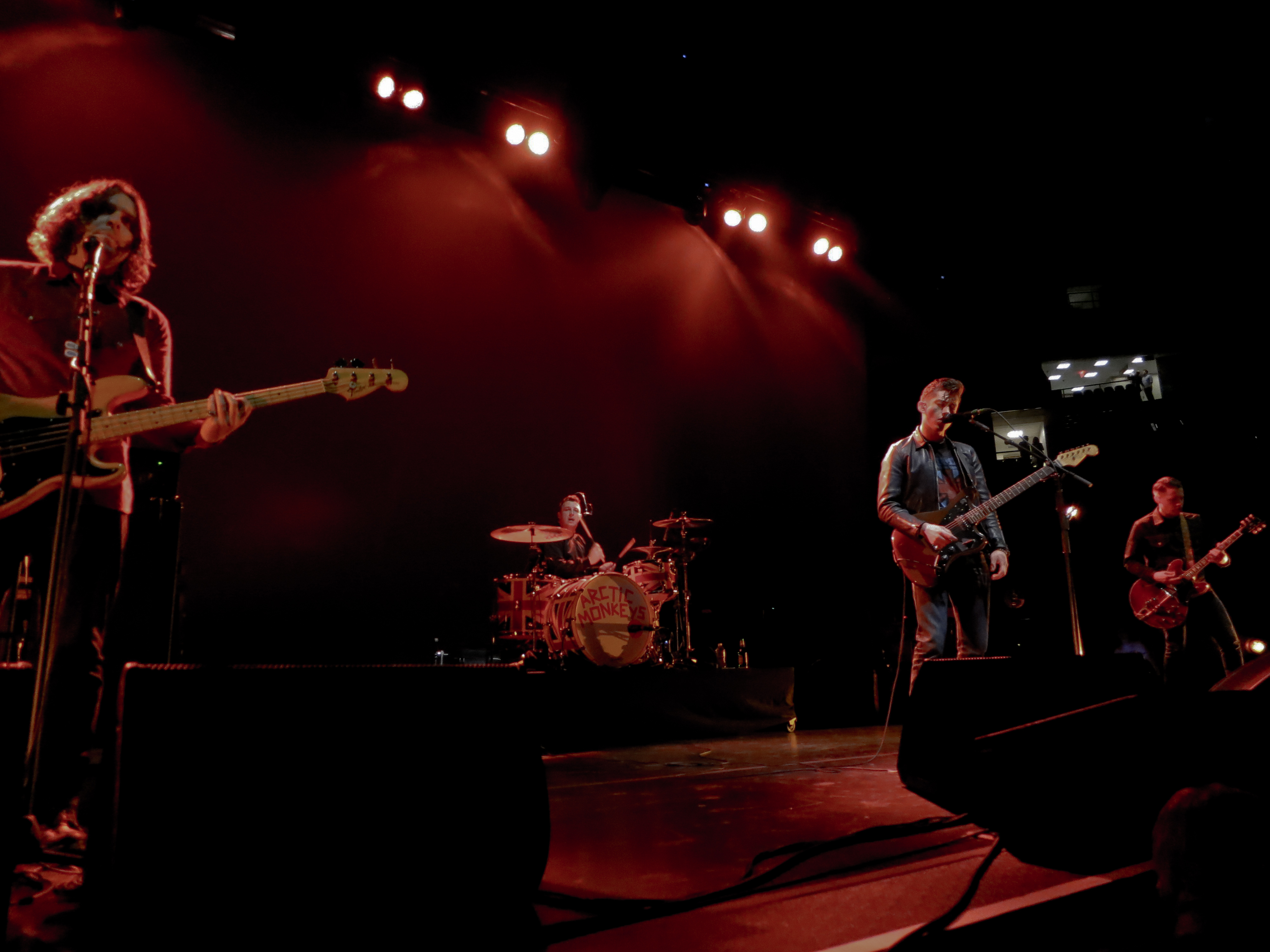
- Death Ramps performing in 2012

Background information
- Also known as: Arctic Monkeys
- Origin: Sheffield, England
- Genres: Indie rock; post-punk revival; psychedelic rock; garage rock
- Years active: 2007–2014; 2018–present
- Label: Domino
- Members: Alex Turner; Jamie Cook; Nick O'Malley; Matt Helders; Richard Hawley; Miles Kane
- Website: arcticmonkeys.com

"Death Ramps" is an alias for British indie rock band Arctic Monkeys. They usually go under this name in collaboration with Miles Kane and fellow Sheffield artist Richard Hawley, and have released five tracks, all B-sides to Arctic Monkeys singles.

Domino, their label, stated: "Unfortunately, we're not allowed to tell you the true identity of the Death Ramps but needless to say they're a band with A Certain Romance (wink, wink)."

== Name ==
In an interview with Another Magazine in 2013, frontman Alex Turner stated:

We used to ride our BMXs on these little hills in the woods where we grew up in Sheffield. As six-year-olds they looked like death ramps to us – I always thought that'd be a cool name for a band. When we started using guest singers like Richard Hawley and Miles Kane on the B-side of our seven-inches we called ourselves the Death Ramps and my mate Reino Lehtonen-Riley, who owns The Great Frog, knocked up some rings. We've all got one.

Turner lost his ring in June 2016.

== The Death Ramps / Nettles single ==
Single cover

The Death Ramps / Nettles single was released on 3 December 2007 on 7" vinyl, limited to just 250 copies.

The songs are the B-sides from the Arctic Monkeys single "Teddy Picker", from their second album Favourite Worst Nightmare.

Track listing

All music is composed by Death Ramps.

No.	Title	Lyrics	Length
1.	"The Death Ramps"	The Death Ramps (instrumental)	3:19
2.	"Nettles"	Alex Turner	1:45

== Other songs ==
"Bad Woman" was released as the B-side on vinyl edition of "Teddy Picker", and on the CD edition together with "The Death Ramps" and "Nettles". The song was originally written and performed by Pat Farrell and the Believers. Richard Hawley is the lead vocalist for the cover and performed the song live with the band on 17 December 2007 in Manchester, for the final date of their Favourite Worst Nightmare tour. The concert was later released as the At the Apollo DVD.

"Little Illusion Machine (Wirral Riddler)" was released as the B-side on "The Hellcat Spangled Shalalala" single. Miles Kane co-wrote the song and featured as the lead singer.

"You and I" was released as the B-side on the "Black Treacle" single on 23 January 2012. It was co-written by Richard Hawley, who also provided lead vocals. It is the first song by the Death Ramps to have a video, which was shot in Sheffield near Dore, and directed by Focus Creeps.
