= Don't Sit Down 'Cause I've Moved Your Chair =

Single by Arctic Monkeys

from the album Suck It and See
- B-side: "Brick by Brick"
- Released: 12 April 2011
- Studio: Sound City, Los Angeles
- Genre: Stoner rock; punk blues
- Length: 3:04
- Label: Domino
- Composers: Jamie Cook; Matt Helders; Nick O'Malley; Alex Turner
- Lyricist: Alex Turner
- Producer: James Ford

Arctic Monkeys singles chronology
"My Propeller" (2010)	"Don't Sit Down 'Cause I've Moved Your Chair" (2011)	"The Hellcat Spangled Shalalala" (2011)

7-inch white label single
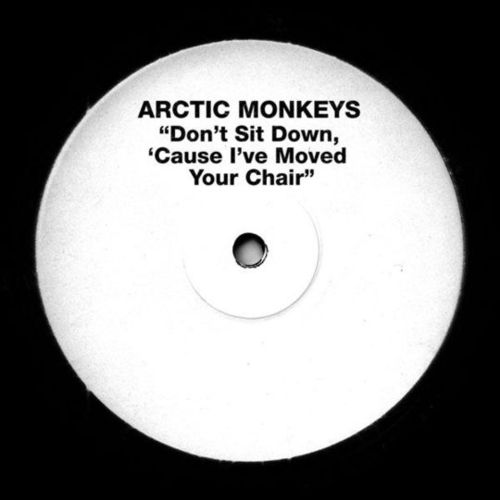

Music video
- "Don't Sit Down 'Cause I've Moved Your Chair" on YouTube

"Don't Sit Down 'Cause I've Moved Your Chair" is a song by the English rock band Arctic Monkeys, released as the lead single from their fourth album Suck It and See on 12 April 2011 through digital download. A "limited-edition white-label seven-inch vinyl version" was released on 16 April, followed by the formal release "on standard seven – and 10-inch vinyl single formats" on 30 May. The song was first played on Zane Lowe's BBC Radio 1 show on 11 April. The band did not consider the track to be the first single until the label suggested it to them.

== Writing ==
The title of the song came from frontman Alex Turner, saying the phrase to an engineer in the studio. Producer James Ford, suggested it sounded like it could be the title of "a ‘60s garage Nuggets tune". Turner wrote the song based on that, and likened it to a bit in Red Hot Chili Peppers' documentary Funky Monks (1991), where Rick Rubin makes a similar proposition to Anthony Kiedis. Similarly, to its B-side, the song lists things the listener should not do. The lyrics reference "doing the Macarena", Turner thought about including other dances such as the conga or the hokey-pokey but chose the Macarena instead as it "flows better".

=== B-sides ===
"The Blond-O-Sonic Shimmer Trap" also appears as the Japanese bonus track on Suck It and See. In an interview, Alex Turner said "I.D.S.T" stands for "If Destroyed Still True" and is considered the second part of "Brick by Brick".

== Chart performance ==
"Don't Sit Down 'Cause I've Moved Your Chair" charted at number 28 in the UK Singles Chart on downloads alone, for the week of 23 April. It spent one week in the top 40, dropping to number 43 the following week. It spent six weeks within the top 100 before a vinyl release propelled it to number 42. The single dropped out of the chart four weeks later. It has spent 12 total weeks within the top 100, their longest run since 2007's "Fluorescent Adolescent", and more than their previous lead single, "Crying Lightning". It is also their second highest charting single in Denmark and Netherlands peaking at number six and number 55 respectively.

In the UK, it sold 81,000 copies in 2011.

== Music video ==
The music video for the single premiered on 14 April 2011 on YouTube. The video shows the band performing the song through a 1980s-style video camera with huge amounts of colour, distortion and an old computer showing the word "DON'T". The video then pans out to see Alex Turner sat on the now infamous chair at the centre of the Kenny/Shiells altercation. Other scenes shown by the distorted colour are the band driving a Cadillac in Los Angeles during recording, Matt Helders wearing a Sixpack France Lucifer jacket, a reference to Kenneth Anger's Lucifer Rising, Alex showing the V sign, Jamie Cook holding a Scythe on the rocks, the band in a black Daimler DS420 and clips of Sheffield Wednesday vs. Manchester United and Arsenal, citing the band's support of Wednesday.

== Track listing ==
All lyrics are written by Alex Turner; all music is composed by Arctic Monkeys

7" (UK Record Store Day Limited Edition)
No.	Title	Length
1.	"Don't Sit Down 'Cause I've Moved Your Chair"	3:04
2.	"Brick by Brick"	2:58

7"
No.	Title	Length
1.	"Don't Sit Down 'Cause I've Moved Your Chair"	3:04
2.	"I.D.S.T."	1:49

10", MP3 digital download
No.	Title	Length
1.	"Don't Sit Down 'Cause I've Moved Your Chair"	3:04
2.	"The Blond-O-Sonic Shimmer Trap"	3:25
3.	"I.D.S.T."	1:49

== Personnel ==
- Alex Turner – lead vocals, guitar
- Jamie Cook – guitar
- Nick O'Malley – bass, backing vocals
- Matt Helders – drums, backing vocals, lead vocals (track two)

== Charts ==
Chart (2011)	Peak position
Belgium (Ultratop 50 Flanders)	50
Belgium (Ultratip Bubbling Under Wallonia)	21
Denmark Airplay (Tracklisten)	6
Germany Airplay (Media Control AG)	89
Italy (FIMI)	92
Netherlands (Single Top 100)	55
Scotland Singles (OCC)	29
UK Singles (OCC)	28
UK Indie (OCC)	4

== Certifications ==
Region	Certification	Certified units/sales
United Kingdom (BPI)	Gold	400,000^{‡}
^{‡} Sales+streaming figures based on certification alone.
