= Matador/Da Frame 2R =

Single by Arctic Monkeys
- Released: 18 June 2007
- Recorded: December 2006
- Studio: Miloco; (London, England)
- Length: 4:56 ("Matador"); 2:22 ("Da Frame 2R")
- Label: Domino (RUG258)
- Songwriters: Jamie Cook; Matt Helders; Nick O'Malley; Alex Turner
- Producers: James Ford; Mike Crossey

Arctic Monkeys singles chronology
"Brianstorm" (2007)	"Matador/Da Frame 2R" (2007)	"Fluorescent Adolescent" (2007)

"Matador" and "Da Frame 2R" (pronounced as "Da Frame Tour", also known as "The Frame to Relevance") are songs by the English rock band Arctic Monkeys, first released as bonus tracks on the Japanese edition of their second studio album, Favourite Worst Nightmare (2007). It was released on 18 June 2007 as a limited edition 7" single in the UK, and as a download-only single, with "Da Frame 2R" as the lead (opening) track. The vinyl release was limited to a release of only 1000 copies.

The limited release was to prevent western fans from having to import the more expensive Japanese edition of Favourite Worst Nightmare.

== Track listing ==
All lyrics are written by Alex Turner; all music is composed by Arctic Monkeys.

7"
No.	Title	Length
1.	"Matador"	4:59
2.	"Da Frame 2R"	2:22

Digital download
No.	Title	Length
1.	"Da Frame 2R"	2:22
2.	"Matador"	4:59
