= Suck It and See (compilation album) =

Suck It & See

Compilation album by Various artists
- Released: May 18, 1999
- Recorded: 1998
- Genre: Electronic, trip hop
- Label: Pussyfoot Records
- Producer: Howie B.

Suck It and See is an electronic music compilation album put together by Howie B. released on his Pussyfoot record label. It was released on 18 May 1999.

== Disc one ==
1. "Love Thong" by Love T.K.O. – 6:12
2. "Luv Bungalow" by Kensuke Shiina – 4:44
3. "Atomic Fuck Machine" by Daddylonglegs – 4:13
4. "Porno Paradise" by Roudoudou – 5:03
5. "Live from the Clermont Lounge" by Tiff McGinnis (featuring Three Wheels Out) – 2:54
6. "Green Door" by Fantastic Plastic Machine – 5:39
7. "(Take Your Pants Off &) Follow the Leader" by Sielab – 4:50
8. "Same Girl Different Wig" by Nick Faber – 6:12
9. "Contemplation" by Lego – 4:58
10. "Pepsi Tuckers Booty Beatdown" by Sie – 5:14

== Disc two ==
1. "In Pursuit of the Pimp Mobile" by Deadly Avenger – 7:15
2. "3" (Back Door Mix) by Hyper Crad – 3:57
3. "Twitchin'" by Tim "Love" Lee (featuring Chantilly Peach) – 4:31
4. "Only If It Hurts" by Howie B. – 4:20
5. "Pink Planet" by DJ Miku – 5:37
6. "Favourite Final Geisha Show" by Chari Chari Chari – 2:28
7. "Jeffrey Poindexter's Maximum Load" by Spacer – 4:12
8. "Cum Dancing" by Inevidence – 5:43
9. "Jenny Cum Lately" by Naked Funk – 11:24
