= The Hellcat Spangled Shalalala =

Single by Arctic Monkeys

from the album Suck It and See
- B-side: "Little Illusion Machine (Wirral Riddler)"
- Released: 15 August 2011
- Studio: Sound City, Los Angeles
- Genre: Guitar pop; indie rock
- Length: 3:00
- Label: Domino
- Composers: Jamie Cook; Matt Helders; Nick O'Malley; Alex Turner
- Lyricist: Alex Turner
- Producer: James Ford

Arctic Monkeys singles chronology
"Don't Sit Down 'Cause I've Moved Your Chair" (2011)	"The Hellcat Spangled Shalalala" (2011)	"Suck It and See" (2011)

Music video
- "The Hellcat Spangled Shalalala" on YouTube

"The Hellcat Spangled Shalalala" is a song by the English rock band Arctic Monkeys. It was released 15 August 2011 by Domino Recording Company as the second single of their fourth album Suck It and See. Produced by James Ford and written by Alex Turner, the song was recorded at Sound City, Los Angeles in early 2011. The song refers to an unknown place frequented by Turner.

The single was released alongside B-side "Little Illusion Machine (Wirral Riddler)" credited to Miles Kane and the Death Ramps. On 8 August 2011, most of the stock of the single was destroyed in the fire at the PIAS Entertainment Group's warehouse during the 2011 London Riots.

== Background ==
The song is based on a place Turner frequented but he said "I don’t necessarily want that to be what the listener associates it with. ’Cause maybe they can relate it to a place they’ve been. I don’t want to ruin that by giving them a map." Turner noted his songs always have a lot of words, so for this album he tried to be more "economical" and said this is one of the songs where he decided "having really simple choruses but quite complicated verses lyrically." Producer James Ford's favourite part of the record is a harmony in this song: "It goes “uh-oh-uh-oh-wo”. Maybe it’s because it sounds like the Klaxons. I always think he prefers them to us."

== Release ==
The 7" vinyl features only one B-side titled "Little Illusion Machine (Wirral Riddler)" and is credited to Miles Kane and the Death Ramps. The Death Ramps is a pseudonym previously adopted by the band when they released a limited edition vinyl with "Teddy Picker" B-sides "Nettles" and "The Death Ramps" back in 2007.

The B-side "Little Illusion Machine (Wirral Riddler)" was made available for streaming on the 8th of August. That same day, most of the stock of the single was destroyed in the fire at the PIAS Entertainment Group's warehouse during the 2011 London Riots, severely hindering the single's retail release. The limited amount of remaining inventory was released exclusively on the band's website.

== Music video ==
The music video for the single premiered on 7 July 2011 on YouTube. It was directed by Focus Creeps and featured footages of the band and model Scarlett Kapella as the "hellcat." On the video, Focus Creeps said: "We would climb into the back of the equipment truck with the model for [the video], running from fans with the band, shooting the entire time."

== Track listing ==
All tracks are written by Arctic Monkeys, except where noted

No.	Title	Length
1.	"The Hellcat Spangled Shalalala"	3:00
2.	"Little Illusion Machine (Wirral Riddler)" (Arctic Monkeys, Miles Kane / The Death Ramps)	3:11

== Personnel ==
=== Arctic Monkeys ===
- Alex Turner – lead vocals, guitar, backing vocals (track two)
- Jamie Cook – guitar
- Nick O'Malley – bass; backing vocals (track one)
- Matt Helders – drums, backing vocals

=== Additional personnel ===
- Miles Kane – lead vocals (track two)

== Charts ==
Chart (2011)	Peak position
Belgium (Ultratip Bubbling Under Flanders)	15
Belgium (Ultratip Bubbling Under Wallonia)	33
Japan Hot 100 (Billboard)	15
UK Indie (OCC)	18

Chart (2018)	Peak position
Bolivia (Monitor Latino)	3

== Release history ==
Country	Release date	Format	Label
United Kingdom	12 August 2011	Digital download	Domino
