= Johanna Bennett =

- Born: Johanna Bennett; 30 September 1984 (age 41); Peterborough, England
- Genres: Alternative rock
- Years active: 2007–present
- Spouse: Matthew Followill (m. 2009)

Johanna Bennett (born 30 September 1984) is an English musician. She was the frontwoman of the band Totalizer, whose demos were produced by Dirty Pretty Things guitarist Anthony Rossomando. The band played a couple of shows and folded in November 2007.

Bennett co-wrote the Arctic Monkeys single "Fluorescent Adolescent" with her then-boyfriend Alex Turner. The song lyrics were developed during a word game while the couple were on holiday.

== Personal life ==
Bennett earned a psychology degree at Goldsmiths, University of London.

Bennett married Kings of Leon lead guitarist Matthew Followill in 2009; they live in Nashville, Tennessee, with their children.
