= Scummy Man =

- The DVD cover
- Directed by: Paul Fraser
- Written by: Paul Fraser
- Produced by: Mark Herbert; Diarmid Scrimshaw
- Starring: Stephen Graham; Lauren Socha; Andrew Turner; Russell Shaw
- Cinematography: Danny Cohen
- Music by: Arctic Monkeys
- Distributed by: Domino Recording Company
- Release date: 10 April 2006
- Language: English

Scummy Man is a short film, written and directed by Paul Fraser and produced by Mark Herbert and Diarmid Scrimshaw, based on the song "When the Sun Goes Down" by the Arctic Monkeys, and released on DVD on 10 April 2006 by Domino Recording Company. The film, like the song, focuses on prostitution in Sheffield, and uses the same actors as the music video to document a night in the life of the fictional 'Nina', a 15-year-old drug addict who works as a prostitute in the Neepsend district.

The film stars Lauren Socha as 'Nina', Stephen Graham as 'George', known by the nickname of 'Scummy Man', Russell Shaw as 'Cowboy' and Andrew Turner as 'Magician'. Scummy Man is a violent and manipulative 'customer' of 'Nina's, who attacks and intimidates both 'Nina' and those who try to help her escape prostitution, such as a magician who offers her a job as his assistant in his act. The magician becomes a victim of the Scummy Man's behaviour but is not without his own flaws, as the film-maker begs if anyone is really inherently good.

In order to achieve a documentary feel for the footage, the film was shot in 16 mm film by Danny Cohen. The DVD includes an extra film titled Just Another Day, which is more hopeful and upbeat in tone, and focuses on how everyday events, such as being offered a lift by a taxicab driver, present opportunity and hope for her future. Just Another Day depicts the same chain of events, but from the perspective of the taxi driver who brings the Scummy Man to Nina, who takes pity on her as she reminds him of his own daughter who died young and would have been the same age as Nina were she still alive.

The name of the film comes from a line in "When the Sun Goes Down", describing the "customer" of the girl featured in the song,

And what a scummy man
Just give him half a chance, I bet he'll rob you if he can
You can see it in his eyes, yeah, that he's got a driving ban
amongst some other offences

The film won an award for "Best Music DVD" at the 2007 NME Awards on 1 March 2007.

The only band member to appear in the film is Matt Helders. He is offered oral sex by Nina at the beginning of the film, but turns it down, saying he is going to band practice. Besides this, Helders and Alex Turner are seen carrying musical equipment through a gate in the credits of Just Another Day, but they do not feature in the film itself.
