= Fluorescent Adolescent =

2007 single by Arctic Monkeys

Single by Arctic Monkeys

from the album Favourite Worst Nightmare
- B-side: "The Bakery"; "Plastic Tramp"; "Too Much to Ask"
- Released: 9 July 2007
- Studio: Eastcote (London)
- Genre: Garage rock; pop rock
- Length: 2:57
- Label: Domino
- Composers: Jamie Cook; Matt Helders; Nick O'Malley; Alex Turner
- Lyricists: Alex Turner; Johanna Bennett
- Producers: Mike Crossey; James Ford

Arctic Monkeys singles chronology
"Matador" / "Da Frame 2R" (2007)	"Fluorescent Adolescent" (2007)	"Teddy Picker" (2007)

Music video
- "Fluorescent Adolescent" on YouTube

"Fluorescent Adolescent" is a song by the English indie rock band Arctic Monkeys. It was released as the second single from their second studio album Favourite Worst Nightmare (2007). It was released on 9 July 2007 in the United Kingdom. The lyrics were written by Alex Turner and Johanna Bennett, Turner's girlfriend at the time, in a hotel room prior to the recording of Favourite Worst Nightmare.

"Fluorescent Adolescent" has been described as a ballad about sex, ageing and nostalgia for youth. It describes a woman who dreams of her youth while her current sex life is unsatisfying and boring. The song peaked at number five on the UK Singles Chart, and was the 83rd best-selling song of 2007 in the United Kingdom. "Fluorescent Adolescent" is one of the band's most popular songs, and is frequently performed as a closer to their concerts. Kate Nash performed a cover of the song on 5 October 2007. It appears on Radio 1's Live Lounge – Volume 3.

The song is often synonymous with the E4 British comedy series The Inbetweeners, frequently being heard during the first series.

== Origin ==
In an interview with The Observer, Johanna Bennett said about the song:

We were on holiday and had cut ourselves off from everything. We were in a really quiet hotel and didn't watch TV or listen to that much music. So as not to drive each other mad we started messing around with these words like a game, singing them to each other. It's great to think that it came from something we did for fun on holiday. It'll always be a good memory for Alex and I. He doesn't usually write lyrics with other people, though I think he enjoyed it.

== Critical reception ==
The song has received a 9/10 rating from Planet Sound, becoming Arctic Monkeys' first single to do so since "I Bet You Look Good on the Dancefloor". In 2023, Rolling Stone and Paste ranked the song number twelve and number nine, respectively, on their lists of the greatest Arctic Monkeys songs.

== Music video ==
The music video showcases a fight between clowns and non-clowns.

The music video was filmed in late April 2007 and was directed by The IT Crowd star Richard Ayoade. It features actor Stephen Graham (who previously appeared on the Scummy Man DVD and the "When the Sun Goes Down" video) as a clown. The music video premiered in the UK on 5 June 2007 on Channel 4, and was available online the next day.

The music video is based around a fight between a group of clowns and a group of non-clowns at an abandoned warehouse. The presumed leaders of the two groups have a flashback showing that they were friends when they were young children. During the flashback, photos of the band as young children are shown. Throughout the fight, each group leader attempts to kill the other. As the music video climaxes, the non-clown leader tries to run over the clown leader. However the clown leader notices that the non-clown leader's car (with the non-clown leader inside) has been leaking fuel and drops his cigarette lighter. The car quickly catches fire and the clown leader looks on as his former friend burns and the music video ends.

Shot in the style of The Sweeney, the video was loosely inspired by the "Out of Control Fairground" by John Cooper Clarke. Turner says he is a fan of Clarke and describes him as a lyrical inspiration; Arctic Monkeys would later adapt Clarke's poem "I Wanna Be Yours" into a song on their 2013 album AM. The poem is also printed inside the CD release of "Fluorescent Adolescent." The lines such as "out of control fairground" and "homicidal clowns" support this. The video was preceded by a warning of violent images. In an MTV interview, Turner stated that the music video "is the best thing we've ever done" while Jamie Cook hailed it as "...probably one of the best videos in the last, like, 10 years".

During a live performance of the song on Friday Night with Jonathan Ross, the band played the song dressed as clowns, with Alex Turner dressing with the same make-up and clothing as the main clown in the video.

During a performance of the song on the Late Show with David Letterman, Letterman introduced the band by joking that his vinyl copy of Favourite Worst Nightmare had been stolen due to its popularity.

== Track listing ==
CD, 10-inch
No.	Title	Lyrics	Music	Length
1.	"Fluorescent Adolescent"	Alex Turner; Johanna Bennett	Arctic Monkeys	3:03
2.	"The Bakery"	Turner	Arctic Monkeys; Miles Kane	2:56
3.	"Plastic Tramp"	Turner	Arctic Monkeys; Kane	2:53
4.	"Too Much to Ask"	Turner	Arctic Monkeys	3:05

7-inch
No.	Title	Lyrics	Music	Length
1.	"Fluorescent Adolescent"	Turner; Bennett	Arctic Monkeys	3:03
2.	"The Bakery"	Turner	Arctic Monkeys; Kane	2:56

== Personnel ==
Personnel taken from Favourite Worst Nightmare liner notes.

Arctic Monkeys

- Alex Turner
- Jamie Cook
- Nick O'Malley
- Matt Helders

Technical personnel

- Mike Crossey – production
- James Ford – production
- Alan Moulder – mixing
- George Marino – mastering

== Chart performance ==
On downloads alone, "Fluorescent Adolescent" charted in the UK Singles Chart at number 55 for the week commencing 25 June 2007. The song charted at number five upon release of the single on CD for the week commencing 16 July 2007. On 27 June 2007, "Fluorescent Adolescent" began receiving significant BBC Radio 1 airplay as the first song on "The A List" Playlist. The song's three B-sides—"Plastic Tramp", "The Bakery" and "Too Much to Ask"—appeared on the UK Singles Chart the week of the single's physical release at number 153, number 161 and number 178, respectively.

=== Weekly charts ===
Chart (2007)	Peak position
Belgium (Ultratip Bubbling Under Flanders)	7
Denmark (Tracklisten)	9
Europe (Eurochart Hot 100)	18
France (SNEP)	88
Germany (GfK)	86
Ireland (IRMA)	12
Scottish Singles Sales (Official Charts)	4
Switzerland Airplay (Schweizer Hitparade)	39
UK Singles (Official Charts)	5
UK Indie (Official Charts)	1

=== Year-end charts ===
Chart (2007)	Position
UK Singles (OCC)	83

== Certifications ==
Region	Certification	Certified units/sales
Denmark (IFPI Danmark)	Gold	45,000^{‡}
Italy (FIMI)	Gold	25,000^{‡}
Spain (Promusicae)	Platinum	60,000^{‡}
United Kingdom (BPI)	5× Platinum	3,000,000^{‡}
Streaming
Greece (IFPI Greece)	Gold	1,000,000^{†}
^{‡} Sales+streaming figures based on certification alone.^{†} Streaming-only figures based on certification alone.
