= Brianstorm =

2007 single by Arctic Monkeys

Single by Arctic Monkeys

from the album Favourite Worst Nightmare
- B-side: "If You Found This It's Probably Too Late"; "Temptation Greets You Like Your Naughty Friend"; "What If You Were Right The First Time?"
- Released: 2 April 2007
- Recorded: December 2006
- Genre: Surf rock; garage rock
- Length: 2:50
- Label: Domino
- Composers: Jamie Cook; Matt Helders; Nick O'Malley; Alex Turner
- Lyricist: Alex Turner
- Producers: Mike Crossey; James Ford

Arctic Monkeys singles chronology
"Leave Before the Lights Come On" (2006)	"Brianstorm" (2007)	"Matador" / "Da Frame 2R" (2007)

Music video
- "Brianstorm" on YouTube

"Brianstorm" is a song by the English rock band Arctic Monkeys. It was released on 2 April 2007 as the lead single from their second studio album, Favourite Worst Nightmare (2007). The song was initially released as a digital download, before being released to physical formats on 16 April 2007.

The song was noticeably louder and heavier than previous efforts, marking the band's evolved sound. The song prominently features 'thundering drums' and surf-rock tremolo guitars. The song is also well known for its intricate and rapid drum track, which was voted the tenth best drum track of the millennium on MusicRadar.

"Brianstorm" was a commercial success, debuting at number 21 in the UK Singles Chart via downloads alone. Following its physical release, it peaked at number two, behind Beyoncé and Shakira's "Beautiful Liar". In Scotland, the song became the band's fourth consecutive number-one single on the Scottish Singles Chart. "Brianstorm" is one of the band's most successful singles worldwide, reaching number four in Denmark, number seven in Ireland, and number 10 in Spain. It came in at number 62 on MTV Asia's list of Top 100 Hits of 2007.

== Background and recording ==
Prior to the single, there had been a great deal of media speculation questioning the band's ability to emulate their successes of 2006 and their debut album. The single marks a noticeable change in the band's logo and cover art, with the "frenetic" cover art seeming to mirror the nature of the track. The track has no chorus, but features an "ascending guitar duel which sounds like a cross between "Telstar", Mogwai and the Monkeys' own "When the Sun Goes Down"." A feature of Arctic Monkeys songs in the past, Alex Turner's Sheffield-accent is again a feature, "singing over rough, relentless bass and surprisingly appropriate guitar triplets."

When asked to say a little about the song's protagonist, Alex Turner replied, "I can't remember Brian now... I don't know if he were in my imagination or what... it's a blank spot in my brain... I think that's what he [Brian] wanted." He later explained in NME that Brian had been a guy that they had met backstage in the band's dressing room at a gig at Studio Coast "Ageha" in Tokyo, Japan. He said, "When he left the room, we were a bit in awe of his presence. So we did a brainstorm for what he was like, drew a little picture and wrote things about him", while guitarist Jamie Cook added, "He was right smooth, very LA. He just appeared with like a business card and like a round neck T-shirt and a tie loosely around it, I'd never seen that before. It felt like he was trying to get inside your mind. We were checking out his attire; it inspired us."

== Critical reception ==
Alfie Sansom from Argus Far described one of the single's B-sides "fun enough", and that "the riff builds with an edgy urgency and pomp", but commented on the Dizzee Rascal feature, adding that he "just expected more from what is probably the most mid-2000s UK collaboration ever".

== Music video ==
The music video for the song, directed by Huse Monfaradi, features the band playing in a sparse sepia set, interspersed with clips of female dancers in front of a large computerised display, stock footage from old medical educational programs and brief flashes of images of objects mentioned in the lyrics, such as "Brian", "jacuzzi" and lightning in place of "thunder". The video was recorded on 14 February 2007, the same day as the 2007 Brit Awards, leading to them missing the ceremony and instead sending two video acceptance messages where they dressed as The Wizard of Oz characters and the Village People. The video premiered on MTV2 on 17 March 2007.

== In popular culture ==
"Brianstorm" gained notoriety in the United States after being played during a three-way brawl between talk show hosts Conan O'Brien, Stephen Colbert, and Jon Stewart on the February 4, 2008 episode of Late Night with Conan O'Brien (during the final weeks of the 2007–08 Writers Guild of America strike), as well as being featured in the rhythm video game Guitar Hero 5, in which it is considered to be one of the hardest tracks on drums due to its sporadic tom-tom beats.

== Track listings ==
All music is composed by Arctic Monkeys.

UK 7-inch single
No.	Title	Lyrics	Length
1.	"Brianstorm"	Alex Turner
2.	"Temptation Greets You Like Your Naughty Friend" (featuring Dizzee Rascal)	Turner; Dizzee Rascal

10-inch and CD single
No.	Title	Lyrics	Length
1.	"If You Found This It's Probably Too Late"	Turner
2.	"Brianstorm"	Turner
3.	"Temptation Greets You Like Your Naughty Friend" (featuring Dizzee Rascal)	Turner; Dizzee Rascal
4.	"What If You Were Right the First Time?"	Turner

== Personnel ==
Personnel taken from Favourite Worst Nightmare liner notes.

Arctic Monkeys

- Alex Turner
- Jamie Cook
- Nick O'Malley
- Matt Helders

Technical personnel

- Mike Crossey – production
- James Ford – production
- Alan Moulder – mixing
- George Marino – mastering

== Charts and certifications ==
=== Weekly charts ===
Chart (2007)	Peak position
Belgium (Ultratip Bubbling Under Flanders)	9
Belgium (Ultratip Bubbling Under Wallonia)	13
Canada Hot 100 (Billboard)	53
Canada Rock (Billboard)	38
Denmark (Tracklisten)	4
Europe (Eurochart Hot 100)	8
France (SNEP)	44
Germany (GfK)	64
Ireland (IRMA)	7
Italy (FIMI)	28
Netherlands (Single Top 100)	36
Scottish Singles Sales (Official Charts)	1
Spain (Promusicae)	10
Switzerland (Schweizer Hitparade)	73
UK Singles (Official Charts)	2
UK Indie (Official Charts)	1
US Bubbling Under Hot 100 (Billboard)	14

=== Year-end charts ===
Chart (2007)	Position
UK Singles (OCC)	76

=== Certifications ===
Region	Certification	Certified units/sales
United Kingdom (BPI)	Platinum	600,000^{‡}
^{‡} Sales+streaming figures based on certification alone.
