= Favourite Worst Nightmare =

2007 studio album by Arctic Monkeys

Studio album by Arctic Monkeys
- Released: 18 April 2007
- Recorded: December 2006
- Studios: Miloco Garden, London; Eastcote, London; Motor Museum, Liverpool; Konk, London
- Genres: Post-punk revival; indie rock; alternative rock; garage rock; post-Britpop
- Length: 37:18
- Label: Domino
- Producers: James Ford; Mike Crossey

Arctic Monkeys chronology
| Who the Fuck Are Arctic Monkeys? (2006) | Favourite Worst Nightmare (2007) | At the Apollo (2008) |

Singles from Favourite Worst Nightmare
- 1. "Brianstorm" Released: 2 April 2007; 2. "Fluorescent Adolescent" Released: 9 July 2007; 3. "Teddy Picker" Released: 3 December 2007

Favourite Worst Nightmare is the second studio album by the English rock band Arctic Monkeys, first released in Japan on 18 April 2007 and in the United Kingdom on 23 April 2007 by Domino Recording Company. Recorded in East London's Miloco Studios with producers James Ford and Mike Crossey, the album was preceded by the release of lead single "Brianstorm" on 2 April 2007. It was the band's first album with new bassist Nick O'Malley, replacing their previous bassist Andy Nicholson, who left the band shortly before the North American tour of the band's debut studio album, Whatever People Say I Am, That’s What I’m Not (2006).

In comparison to their debut album, the album is considered more musically ambitious, with ambient sounds and expanded drum rhythms being introduced. As with their debut, Favourite Worst Nightmare received widespread acclaim from critics, who highlighted the band's new emotional depth and frontman Alex Turner's matured songwriting. NME and Uncut ranked it the second-best album of 2007, while Dutch publication OOR named it the best of 2007. Retrospectively, the album is considered the start of the band's change of sound with each of their albums after their debut.

Like their debut album, Favourite Worst Nightmare debuted at number one on the UK Albums Chart, selling over 227,000 copies in its first week of release. "Brianstorm" and "Fluorescent Adolescent" were also both hits on the UK Singles Chart, with the former reaching number two on the chart. In the United States, the album debuted at number seven on the Billboard 200, selling approximately 44,000 copies in its first week. The album has since been certified 5× platinum in the UK. It was nominated for the 2007 Mercury Prize and won Best British Album at the 2008 Brit Awards.

== Title and cover art ==
The album's title comes from a lyric in the song "D is for Dangerous", the third track on the album: "I think you should know you're his favourite worst nightmare". The band said they also considered naming the album Lesbian Wednesdays, Gordon Brown, or Gary Barlow. In an interview with NME, Nick O'Malley announced several songs including "D is for Dangerous" and "Balaclava". The tracks "The Bakery" and "Plastic Tramp" also mentioned in the NME interview did not make it onto the album, but were later released as B-sides on the "Fluorescent Adolescent" single. The track "Leave Before the Lights Come On" was also rumoured for inclusion, but did not make the final cut.

Half of the album's songs were debuted at concerts before the release of the album. The album was recorded quickly as the band wanted to start touring and play the songs.

The album's cover art features a black-and-white photograph of a house in the Garston district of Liverpool, with colourful cartoonish images visible through its windows. This marks the second consecutive time the band used a photograph taken in Liverpool as an album cover, following their debut album Whatever People Say I Am, That's What I'm Not.

== Musical style ==
The music on Favourite Worst Nightmare has been characterised as post-punk revival, indie rock, alternative rock, garage rock, and post-Britpop. In comparison to the band's debut album Whatever People Say I Am, That's What I'm Not, the album has been described as "very, very fast and very, very loud", being seen as "more ambitious, heavier...and with a fiercely bright production". Reflecting the band's travels around the world more than the local stories of the first record, Favourite Worst Nightmare is a "faster, meaner" album. The album arguably has influences from The Smiths – "twanging, quasi-ambient backdrops...and Turner's voice [...] crooning like Morrissey or Richard Hawley." Matt Helders said "James was DJing loads in the evening so we'd go out and [...] have a dance." As a result, the drum rhythms of Helders and bassist Nick O'Malley have drawn comparisons to the Eighties funk band ESG. The band's love of classic films also influenced their new style. For example, the organ at the beginning of the album's final track, "505" replicates Ennio Morricone's soundtrack for The Good, the Bad and the Ugly (where Angel Eyes enters before the final standoff).

== Critical reception ==
Professional ratings
Aggregate scores
| Source | Rating |
|---|---|
| Metacritic | 82/100 |
Review scores
| Source | Rating |
| AllMusic | 4.5/5 stars |
| Entertainment Weekly | B+ |
| The Guardian | 4/5 stars |
| Los Angeles Times | 3.5/4 stars |
| MSN Music (Consumer Guide) | B+ |
| NME | 9/10 |
| Pitchfork | 7.4/10 |
| Q | 5/5 stars |
| Rolling Stone | 3.5/5 stars |
| Spin | 3/5 stars |

Like with the band's debut album, Favourite Worst Nightmare has received widespread critical acclaim since its release. It has a score of 82 on Metacritic, which assigns a normalised rating out of 100, based on 38 reviews.

In a 5-star review, The Daily Express described it as "a shockingly good release that just gets better, faster and stronger with each listen", while The Guardian said it had "successfully negotiated the daunting task of following up the biggest-selling debut album in British history" and stated that the second half of the album was the stronger half, noting the similarity to Morrissey in "Fluorescent Adolescent" whilst criticising the opening tracks, "Brianstorm" in particular. Their progression was also highlighted with The Guardian saying "if you removed everything from the album except Matt Helders' drumming, it would still be a pretty gripping listen", and The Observer praising the new sounds on the album referencing the "piercing, melodic guitar by Jamie Cook" and "where Turner reveals the other weapons in his armoury" when referring to Alex Turner's progression. Blender's Jon Dolan compared the album negatively to their debut "they've followed their funny, catchy debut with a less funny, less catchy second record", nevertheless he liked the more melodic tracks saying, "the Monkeys are, at heart, a pop band, and a heroic one at that". Pitchfork Media noticed the "new emotional depth" of tracks such as "Do Me a Favour", "Only Ones Who Know" and "505", which were also commonly cited by most other critics as being amongst the highlights. NME and Uncut ranked it as the second-best album of 2007. Dutch publication OOR named it the best of 2007.

Jacob Stolworthy of The Independent reviewed the album on its 10th anniversary in 2017, saying, "Favourite Worst Nightmare was the first sign that Arctic Monkeys would change up their sound with each new record in as drastic a fashion as they wished [...] If their debut defined a generation, this record shaped the band's future in a manner more mature, sexy and - just like the party depicted in the rowdy track 'This House Is a Circus' - berserk as f*ck."

== Commercial performance ==
In its first week of release, Favourite Worst Nightmare sold 227,993 copies, emulating Whatever People Say I Am, That's What I'm Not in going straight to number one on the UK Albums Chart, albeit selling 130,000 copies fewer than the band's record-breaking debut. The first two singles from the album, "Brianstorm" and "Fluorescent Adolescent", were both UK top-10 hits. The album's first day sales of 85,000 outsold the rest of the top 20 combined, while all 12 tracks from the album entered the top 200 of the UK Singles Chart. By September 2022, 1,200,000 copies of the album had been sold in the UK; it was certified 5× Platinum in 2026. The album was nominated for the Mercury Prize in 2007 and won Best British Album at the BRIT Awards the following year.

In the United States, the album debuted at number 7 on the Billboard 200, selling around 44,000 copies in its first week and become the band's first top-10 album there. The album also achieved top-10 debuts in 12 other countries, including Australia, Canada, Ireland, France, Japan, Mexico, and New Zealand.

== Track listing ==
All lyrics are written by Alex Turner, except where noted; all music is composed by Arctic Monkeys.

Favourite Worst Nightmare track listing
| No. | Title | Lyrics | Length |
|---|---|---|---|
| 1. | "Brianstorm" | | 2:52 |
| 2. | "Teddy Picker" | | 2:40 |
| 3. | "D Is for Dangerous" | | 2:14 |
| 4. | "Balaclava" | | 2:47 |
| 5. | "Fluorescent Adolescent" | Turner; Johanna Bennett | 2:53 |
| 6. | "Only Ones Who Know" | | 3:01 |
| 7. | "Do Me a Favour" | | 3:25 |
| 8. | "This House Is a Circus" | | 3:09 |
| 9. | "If You Were There, Beware" | | 4:34 |
| 10. | "The Bad Thing" | | 2:23 |
| 11. | "Old Yellow Bricks" | Turner; Jon McClure | 3:07 |
| 12. | "505" | | 4:14 |
| Total length: | | | 37:19 |

Japanese edition bonus tracks
| No. | Title | Length |
|---|---|---|
| 13. | "Da Frame 2R" | 2:20 |
| 14. | "Matador" | 4:57 |

=== Bonus video ===
- The music video for "Brianstorm" was included as a bonus with iTunes pre-orders of Favourite Worst Nightmare.

== Personnel ==
Credits taken from liner notes, except where noted.

Arctic Monkeys

- Alex Turner – lead vocals, guitar; Hammond organ (12)
- Jamie Cook – guitar
- Nick O'Malley – bass guitar
- Matt Helders – drums; vocals (3)

Additional musicians

- James Ford – additional guitar (6), tambourine (12)
- Miles Kane – additional guitar (12)

Production

- James Ford – production; mixing (tracks 2, 6, 10, 11)
- Mike Crossey – production; mixing (tracks 2, 6, 10, 11)
- Alan Moulder – mixing (tracks 1, 3–5, 7–9, 12)
- George Marino – mastering

Artwork

- Juno – art direction and design, illustrations, booklet photography
- Matthew Cooper – layout
- Joseph Bramhall – illustrations
- Graphique Club – illustrations
- Drew Millward – illustrations
- Al Heighton – illustrations
- Anne-Marie Moore – illustrations
- Tobias – illustrations
- de5ign4 – spray can murals
- Matt Goodfellow – photography

== Charts ==
=== Weekly charts ===
Weekly chart performance for Favourite Worst Nightmare
| Chart (2007) | Peak position |
|---|---|
| Australian Albums (ARIA) | 2 |
| Austrian Albums (Ö3 Austria) | 6 |
| Belgian Albums (Ultratop Flanders) | 3 |
| Belgian Albums (Ultratop Wallonia) | 9 |
| Canadian Albums (Billboard) | 4 |
| Danish Albums (Hitlisten) | 1 |
| Dutch Albums (Album Top 100) | 1 |
| Finnish Albums (Suomen virallinen lista) | 14 |
| French Albums (SNEP) | 6 |
| German Albums (Offizielle Top 100) | 2 |
| Irish Albums (IRMA) | 1 |
| Italian Albums (FIMI) | 14 |
| Japanese Albums (Oricon) | 4 |
| Mexican Albums (Top 100 Mexico) | 43 |
| New Zealand Albums (RMNZ) | 4 |
| Norwegian Albums (VG-lista) | 2 |
| Polish Albums (ZPAV) | 48 |
| Scottish Albums (Official Charts) | 1 |
| Spanish Albums (Promusicae) | 20 |
| Swedish Albums (Sverigetopplistan) | 17 |
| Swiss Albums (Schweizer Hitparade) | 6 |
| UK Albums (Official Charts) | 1 |
| US Billboard 200 | 7 |
| US Top Rock Albums (Billboard) | 3 |
| European Top 100 Albums | 3 |

=== Year-end charts ===
Year-end chart performance for Favourite Worst Nightmare
| Charts (2007) | Position |
|---|---|
| Belgian Albums (Ultratop Flanders) | 36 |
| Belgian Albums (Ultratop Wallonia) | 100 |
| Dutch Albums (Album Top 100) | 56 |
| French Albums (SNEP) | 117 |
| Japanese Albums (Oricon) | 96 |
| UK Albums (OCC) | 8 |

2022 year-end chart performance for Favourite Worst Nightmare
| Chart (2022) | Position |
|---|---|
| Belgian Albums (Ultratop Flanders) | 158 |
| Lithuanian Albums (AGATA) | 26 |
| UK Albums (OCC) | 91 |

2023 year-end chart performance for Favourite Worst Nightmare
| Chart (2023) | Position |
|---|---|
| Belgian Albums (Ultratop Flanders) | 153 |
| UK Albums (OCC) | 81 |

=== Decade-end charts ===
Decade-end chart performance for Favourite Worst Nightmare
| Chart (2010–2019) | Position |
|---|---|
| UK Vinyl Albums (OCC) | 66 |

== Certifications ==
Certifications and sales for Favourite Worst Nightmare
| Region | Certification | Certified units/sales |
|---|---|---|
| Australia (ARIA) | Gold | 35,000^{^} |
| Denmark (IFPI Danmark) | Gold | 10,000^{‡} |
| Italy (FIMI) sales since 2009 | Gold | 25,000^{‡} |
| Japan (RIAJ) | Gold | 100,000^{^} |
| New Zealand (RMNZ) | 2× Platinum | 30,000^{‡} |
| United Kingdom (BPI) | 5× Platinum | 1,500,000^{‡} |
^{^} Shipments figures based on certification alone.^{‡} Sales+streaming figures based on certification alone.

== Release history ==
Release history for Favourite Worst Nightmare
| Country | Date | Label | Format | Catalog number |
|---|---|---|---|---|
| Japan | 18 April 2007 | Hostess | CD | HSE-10043 |
| Germany | 20 April 2007 | | CD | |
| Ireland | 20 April 2007 | | CD | |
| Spain | 20 April 2007 | | CD | |
| Australia | 21 April 2007 | | CD | |
| United Kingdom | 23 April 2007 | Domino | LP | WIGLP188 / 5034202018810 |
| United Kingdom | 23 April 2007 | Domino | CD | WIGCD188 / 5034202018827 |
| Brazil | 23 April 2007 | EMI | CD | |
| France | 23 April 2007 | | CD | |
| Belgium | 23 April 2007 | | CD | |
| United States | 24 April 2007 | Domino; Warner Bros. | CD | DNO 136 / 801390013621 |
| Israel | 24 April 2007 | | CD | |
| Canada | 24 April 2007 | Domino; WEA International | CD | |
