= Suck It and See =

2011 studio album by Arctic Monkeys

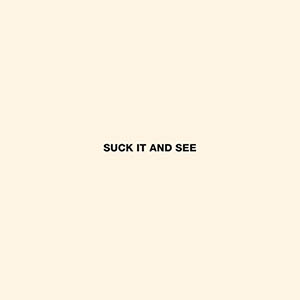
- CD and LP cover (Note: On the digital cover, the "Suck It and See" text is enlarged.)

Studio album by Arctic Monkeys
- Released: 6 June 2011
- Recorded: January–February 2011
- Studios: Sound City, Los Angeles
- Genres: Guitar pop; indie rock; psychedelic rock; garage rock
- Length: 40:04
- Label: Domino
- Producer: James Ford

Arctic Monkeys chronology
Humbug (2009)	Suck It and See (2011)	AM (2013)

Singles from Suck It and See
- 1. "Don't Sit Down 'Cause I've Moved Your Chair" Released: 12 May 2011; 2. "The Hellcat Spangled Shalalala" Released: 15 August 2011; 3. "Suck It and See" Released: 31 October 2011; 4. "Black Treacle" Released: 23 January 2012

Suck It and See is the fourth studio album by English rock band Arctic Monkeys, released on 6 June 2011 by Domino Recording Company. The album's songs were written by frontman Alex Turner in 2010 on an acoustic guitar in his, at the time, Brooklyn home. It was produced in Los Angeles at Sound City Studios by the band's longtime collaborator James Ford in early 2011, using mostly live takes (as opposed to overdubbing). The album's title, a British phrase meaning "give it a try", was viewed as provocative in the United States due to being misinterpreted as referencing fellatio, and was subsequently censored in some locations. The artwork features the album title in black over a cream coloured background.

Musically, Suck It and See represents a departure for the band following the darker sound of its predecessor Humbug (2009), instead featuring a lighter guitar pop and psychedelic pop sound. It draws influences from post-punk, country music, surf rock, and glam rock. Its lyrical content features themes of romance, heartbreak, ageing, and loneliness, as well as several references to films and British colloquialisms.

Suck It and See received generally positive reviews from music critics, with many calling it an improvement over its predecessor. Critics generally complimented the band's stylistic shift, although opinion varied on Turner's lyrics. It became the band's fourth consecutive number-one debut in the UK, having been certified platinum in the country, and its second top 15 album in the US. Upon release, the album was promoted by the singles "Don't Sit Down 'Cause I've Moved Your Chair", "The Hellcat Spangled Shalalala", "Black Treacle", and its title track, as well as a global tour and several television appearances.

== Background and recording ==
The band's previous record Humbug was released in August 2009 to positive reviews from critics, that noted the album's tone was darker, compared to their previous work. Following the release of Humbug, film director and friend Richard Ayoade was directing a film adaptation of Joe Dunthorne's novel, Submarine. Ayoade chose frontman Alex Turner for the film's soundtrack, who composed six original tracks.

The band wanted to get into the studio straight after the tour ended, but did not have any new material. Throughout 2010, Turner wrote the majority of the songs at his home in Brooklyn, New York, telling Metro magazine: "I wrote a lot of the new album while I was living in New York and I found myself using more English colloquialisms than ever." Turner finished recording the soundtrack in April 2010, and first talks of recording Suck It and See occurred in May. Shortly after, Jamie Cook visited Turner in New York City, to write some guitar parts. In September of that year, Turner and the band, alongside producer James Ford, reunited in London to develop the tracks.

Recording and mixing took place at Sound City Studios in Los Angeles, California with producer James Ford over five weeks in January–February 2011. The plan was to record it over two weeks and then take a break to listen to it, but they later decided to go straight into mixing. Turner has commented that rather than going into the studio with only rough sketches of songs, and making heavy use of overdubbing, the band focused much of their time rehearsing written songs together, coming up with new ideas in the process. Turner stated that the band recorded most of the album live in the studio, "So that meant we could really concentrate on beefing up the guitar sounds." The band tried to record one track a day, with some taking more time to put "finishing touches." During the sessions the songs were recorded in a concrete order, which at the time was thought to be the final order the album would be sequenced in. The track "Piledriver Waltz" was first released on Turner's Submarine, where it was credited to Turner as a solo artist, featuring Ford on drums. The version included on Suck It and See is a re-recording with the whole band involved. "Brick By Brick" was the first track done for the album, with a demo being recorded by Turner and drummer Matt Helders after touring ended in 2010.

== Composition ==
=== Musical style and influences ===
Suck It and See represents a departure for the band after the darker sound of their previous album Humbug (2009). Speaking to NME shortly before the album's release, drummer Matt Helders promised to deliver a more "instant", "poppy", and "vintage" sound in comparison to Humbug. Featuring a wide variety of styles, commentators have characterised the music as guitar pop, indie rock, indie pop, and psychedelic pop. Consequence of Sound further noted the presence of surf rock and the band's "own interpretation" of glam rock. Q magazine calls the album "the sound of a band drawing back the curtains and letting the sunshine in".

The album has been compared to the works of the Smiths and Richard Hawley. Turner cited as influences artists such as Nick Cave, John Cale, Lou Reed, David Bowie, Leonard Cohen, Iggy Pop, the Pixies and the Beach Boys. Turner also looked to country music for inspiration, despite the album having no identifiable country sounds: "There's something about the formula of those songs and lyrics that I really connect to. There's some really wonderful songs by those old country guys like George Jones or Townes Van Zandt or Roger Miller. They're really funny, really sad and tender and they clearly know what they're doing in terms of songwriting as a craft. Sometimes they're smart-arsed, but I'm kind of guilty of that myself. Willie Nelson's Crazy is approaching perfection."

== Artwork and title ==
According to Turner, the title is "an old Britishism, like a bit Dick Van Dyke-y, like 'give it a try' almost – it'd be a slogan for some candy." He acknowledged that saying "[didn't] really travel very well". The band settled on Suck It and See as the title after debating between titles such as The Rain-Shaped Shimmer Trap, The Thunder-Suckle Fuzz Canyon, The Blond-O-Sonic Rape Alarm, and Thriller, according to a band interview in the NME. In the United States, the title on the cover sleeve was covered by a sticker in certain big-box retailers. In an interview with British radio station XFM, Turner said: "They think it is rude, disrespectful and they're putting a sticker over it in America in certain stores, big ones." The English idiom "suck it and see" means that something must be tried first, appearing, for example, in a 2010 The Economist headline and (as "suck 'em and see") in the advertising slogan of Andrews Antacid lozenges. The album title has also been interpreted as a suggestive reference to the ‘Peel slowly and see’ directions on the famous Velvet Underground & Nico cover.

Regarding the artwork, which just features the album title in black over a cream-colored background, Turner said: “Once we decided to call the album what it’s called we just decided to go with something very plain and simple. It slowly became apparent that that type of cover was ideal for it. What else would you have otherwise? An image of a person with a lollipop in their mouth? Probably not.” He also said it represented the music, “The cover is the cover because the music is really quite simple. There isn’t any marked level of overdubs on it, and it’s recorded quite basically.”

== Release and promotion ==
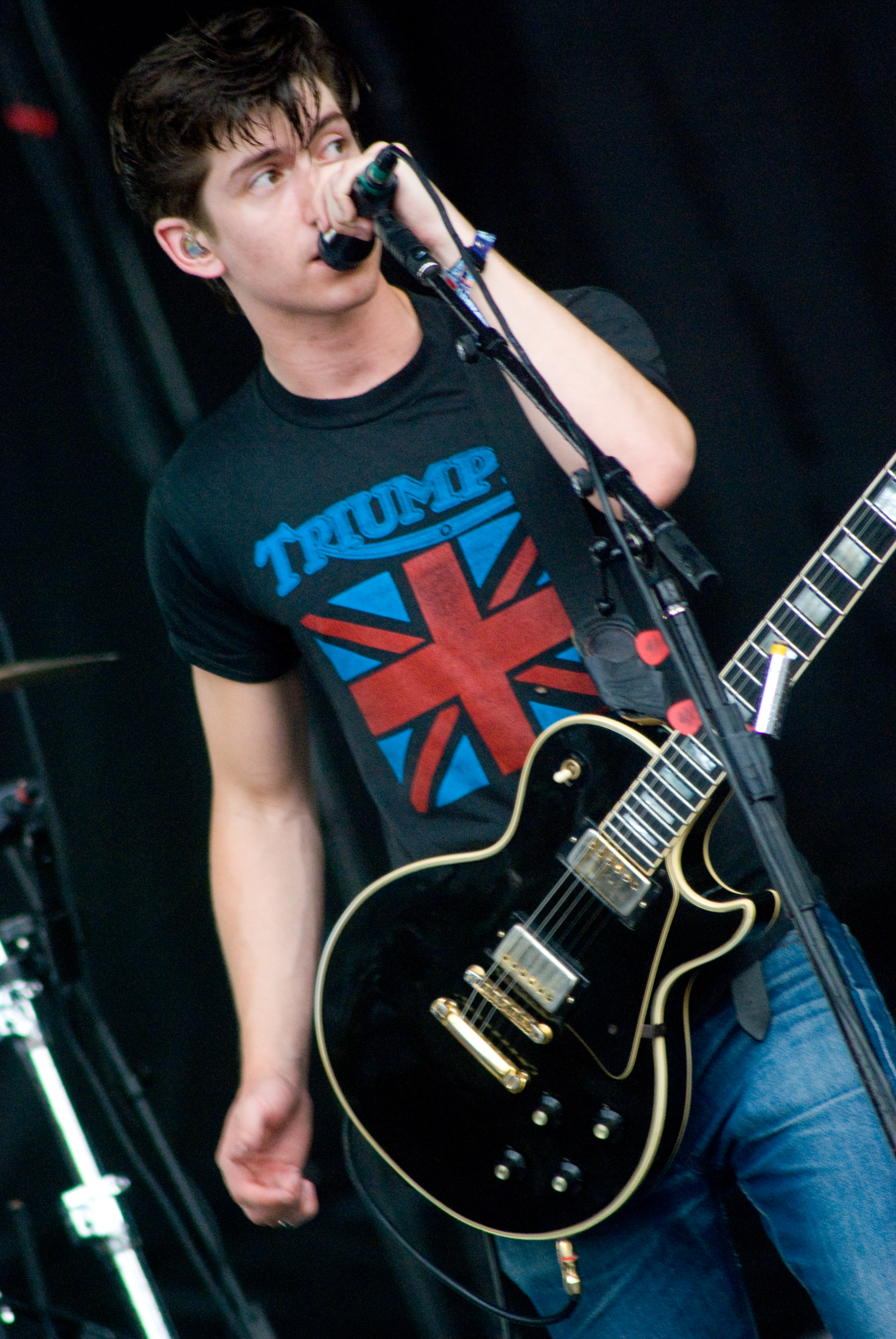
Frontman Alex Turner at Lollapalooza in Chicago, August 2011

On 4 March 2011, the band premiered on its website a new track called "Brick by Brick" with lead vocals by Matt Helders. Helders explained that it was "not a single, just a tease of what is coming and that is it is going to be on the upcoming album." The album's title and release date were unveiled six days later on 10 March.

Arctic Monkeys embarked in May 2011 on their Suck It and See Tour. They headlined the Benicàssim Festival 2011 alongside the Strokes, Arcade Fire and Primal Scream. They also headlined Oxegen 2011, Super Bock Super Rock 2011, V Festival 2011, Rock Werchter and T in The Park 2011. They confirmed on 7 February that they were playing two "massive homecoming shows" at the Don Valley Bowl in Sheffield on 10 and 11 June, support included Miles Kane, Anna Calvi, the Vaccines and Dead Sons and Mabel Love, clips from the show were also used in the music video for "The Hellcat Spangled Shalalala". They played at Lollapalooza in Chicago, Illinois from 5–7 August 2011. On 21 August, they also played at Lowlands, the Netherlands. The tour continued until March 2012.

On 13 May, Arctic Monkeys appeared on Later... with Jools Holland and performed four tracks from the album: "Library Pictures", "Don't Sit Down 'Cause I've Moved Your Chair", "Reckless Serenade" and "The Hellcat Spangled Shalalala".

=== Singles ===
Four singles were released to promote the album. The lead single, "Don't Sit Down 'Cause I've Moved Your Chair", was released digitally on 12 April 2011, and on 16 April three thousand 7" vinyl copies were released worldwide by the band as part of Record Store Day, backed with "Brick by Brick". It was given a wider release on 30 May 2011, available on 10" vinyl and digital download with backed with "The Blond-O-Sonic Shimmer Trap" and "I.D.S.T.", and on 7" vinyl, backed with "I.D.S.T.".

The second single taken from the album, "The Hellcat Spangled Shalalala", was released on 15 August 2011, backed with a new Death Ramps track featuring Miles Kane, "Little Illusion Machine (Wirral Riddler)". Most of the stock was burned because of the London riots. A limited edition 7" Vinyl of the single was then released over the band's website on 14 August. The song reached No. 15. in Belgium. On 31 October 2011, the title track "Suck It and See" was released as the third single, backed with a new song, "Evil Twin". They performed the song on The Graham Norton Show on 28 October. The fourth and final single, "Black Treacle", was released on 23 January 2012, backed with a second new Death Ramps song, "You & I", featuring Richard Hawley. In March, the band embarked on a North American stadium tour supporting the Black Keys.

=== Commercial performance ===
The album has been successful commercially. In its first week of release, the album debuted at number one in the United Kingdom, selling over 82,000 units and knocking Lady Gaga's Born This Way off the top spot. In its second week, the album sold a further 34,910 units in the UK. The album sold 154,000 units in its first week worldwide, selling 333,000 units overall. On 30 May, a week before official release, Domino Records streamed the entire album on SoundCloud. Within a few hours of being made public, the first two tracks had reached over 10,000 listens each, and by the end of the week, each had accrued over 100,000 plays.

== Critical reception ==
Professional ratings
Aggregate scores
Source	Rating
AnyDecentMusic?	7.2/10
Metacritic	74/100
Review scores
Source	Rating
AllMusic	3.5/5 stars
The A.V. Club	C−
The Daily Telegraph	4/5 stars
Entertainment Weekly	B−
The Guardian	4/5 stars
NME	9/10
Pitchfork	7.5/10
Q	4/5 stars
Rolling Stone	3.5/5 stars
Spin	8/10

Suck It and See received positive reviews from critics, with a 74 rating at Metacritic based on 32 critics.

Jody Rosen of Rolling Stone called the album the band's best since their debut. Stephen Thomas Erlewine of AllMusic stated: "Suck It and See may be at the opposite end of the spectrum from Humbug – it's concentrated and purposeful where its predecessor sprawled – yet it still demands attention from the listener, delivering its rewards according to just how much time you're willing to devote." Although Andrew Perry of The Daily Telegraph felt the record was an improvement over Humbug, he still writes that the album contains "jangling riffs" and "laugh-out-loud lyrics that would make Morrissey proud". Similarly, The Guardian's Alexis Petridis also considered Suck It and See to be an improvement over its predecessor, complimenting the band's style shift. Nevertheless, he felt some tracks were not that memorable, while some of Turner's lyrics were below average in comparison to previous efforts. Overall, Petridis calls Suck It and See "the first Arctic Monkeys album that tries to ensnare the listener with its tunes," as opposed to guitar riffs and lyrics, and represents the band becoming "an increasingly well-rounded rock band." Marc Hogan of Pitchfork also gave the album a positive review, calling it the band's "most rewarding" record to date. Unlike other reviewers, Hogan complimented Turner's lyrics, calling them "always keenly-observed", further complimenting the music as "ever-proficient". He overall praised the group's evolution up to that point. In July, the album won Mojo award for the Best Album of 2011. Mojo placed the album at number 39 on its list of "Top 50 albums of 2011."

The album still received some mixed reviews. Evan Rytlewski of The A.V. Club criticised Turner's lyrics as less sly and sophisticated, while also finding the songs themselves to be slower and less memorable than their previous efforts. Kyle Anderson of Entertainment Weekly found that although the album "hits hard", "the boyish energy of their early work is still missed." Dorian Lynksey of The Word was also mixed, stating that "an overload of hyper-chiselled lyricism and a touch too much of yer manly riff-rock." NME named the album cover, an artwork free cream monochrome after the styling of the Beatles' White Album, as one of the worst in history.

Retrospectively, reviewers have typically placed Suck It and See in the middle-low tier in rankings of the band's studio albums. In 2015, NME ranked Suck It and See fourth of the band's five albums up to that point. Lisa Wright writes that the album displayed a variety of styles that "showed a band absolutely in control of what they were doing and one that could bend ideas and genres to fit to their own shape." In 2018, Consequence of Sound ranked Suck It and See fourth of the band's six albums up to that point. Sarah Midkiff states: "While experimental, it's a distillation of their previous works, emerging stylistically confident in their choices." The same year, the album was given the same ranking by the Evening Standard, with Harry Fletcher stating that although the record lacked strong singles and "standout moments", he gave praise to Turner's lyrics, calling them some of his finest up to that point.

== Track listing ==
All lyrics are written by Alex Turner; all music is composed by Arctic Monkeys.

No.	Title	Length
1.	"She's Thunderstorms"	3:54
2.	"Black Treacle"	3:35
3.	"Brick by Brick"	2:59
4.	"The Hellcat Spangled Shalalala"	3:00
5.	"Don't Sit Down 'Cause I've Moved Your Chair"	3:03
6.	"Library Pictures"	2:22
7.	"All My Own Stunts"	3:52
8.	"Reckless Serenade"	2:42
9.	"Piledriver Waltz"	3:23
10.	"Love Is a Laserquest"	3:11
11.	"Suck It and See"	3:45
12.	"That's Where You're Wrong"	4:16
Total length:		40:04

Japanese edition bonus track
No.	Title	Length
13.	"The Blond-O-Sonic Shimmer Trap"	3:28
Total length:		43:37

== Personnel ==
Credits taken from liner notes, except where noted.

Arctic Monkeys

- Alex Turner – lead and backing vocals, guitar
- Jamie Cook – guitar
- Nick O'Malley – bass guitar, backing vocals
- Matt Helders – drums, backing vocals, lead vocals on "Brick by Brick"

Additional musicians

- Josh Homme – backing vocals on "All My Own Stunts"

Technical

- James Ford – production
- James Brown – engineering
- Sean Oakley – engineering assistance
- David Covell – engineering assistance
- Craig Silvey – mixing
- Morgan Stratton – mixing assistance
- Bryan Wilson – mixing assistance
- George Marino – mastering

Artwork

- Matthew Cooper – art direction, design
- Jason Evans – art direction, design
- Aaron Brown – photography

== Charts ==
=== Chart positions ===
2011 weekly chart performance for Suck It and See
Charts (2011)	Peak position
Australian Albums (ARIA)	4
Austrian Albums (Ö3 Austria)	12
Belgian Albums (Ultratop Flanders)	2
Belgian Alternative Albums (Ultratop Flanders)	2
Belgian Albums (Ultratop Wallonia)	9
Canadian Albums (Billboard)	12
Danish Albums (Hitlisten)	2
Dutch Albums (Album Top 100)	6
Dutch Alternative Albums (Mega Alternative Top 30)	1
Finnish Albums (Suomen virallinen lista)	34
French Albums (SNEP)	7
Greek Albums (IFPI)	38
German Albums (Offizielle Top 100)	10
Irish Albums (IRMA)	3
Italian Albums (FIMI)	28
Japanese Albums (Oricon)	12
Mexican Albums (Top 100 Mexico)	27
New Zealand Albums (RMNZ)	7
Norwegian Albums (VG-lista)	4
Portuguese Albums (AFP)	7
Scottish Albums (Official Charts)	1
Spanish Albums (Promusicae)	10
Swedish Albums (Sverigetopplistan)	33
Swiss Albums (Schweizer Hitparade)	8
UK Albums (Official Charts)	1
UK Independent Albums (Official Charts)	1
US Billboard 200	14
US Independent Albums (Billboard)	4
US Top Alternative Albums (Billboard)	5
US Top Rock Albums (Billboard)	6
US Indie Store Album Sales (Billboard)	2

=== Year-end charts ===
2011 year-end chart performance for Suck It and See
Chart (2011)	Position
Belgian Albums (Ultratop Flanders)	46
Belgian Alternative Albums (Ultratop Flanders)	21
Danish Albums (Hitlisten)	91
French Albums (SNEP)	129
UK Albums (OCC)	50

== Certifications ==
Sales certifications for Suck It and See
Region	Certification	Certified units/sales
United Kingdom (BPI)	Platinum	512,000
