= Suck It and See (song) =

Single by Arctic Monkeys

from the album Suck It and See
- B-side: "Evil Twin"
- Released: 31 October 2011
- Studio: Sound City, Los Angeles
- Genre: Pop rock; indie rock
- Length: 3:45
- Label: Domino
- Composer(s): Jamie Cook; Matt Helders; Nick O'Malley; Alex Turner
- Lyricist(s): Alex Turner
- Producer(s): James Ford

Arctic Monkeys singles chronology
"The Hellcat Spangled Shalalala" (2011)	"Suck It and See" (2011)	"Black Treacle" (2012)

Music video
- "Suck It and See" on YouTube

"Suck It and See" is a song by English band Arctic Monkeys. It was released on 31 October 2011 by Domino Recording Company as the third single and title track of their fourth studio album Suck It and See. Produced by James Ford and written by Alex Turner it was recorded at Sound City, Los Angeles in early 2011.

The song was released via MP3 digital download and 7" vinyl with the song "Evil Twin" appearing as a B-side. It is one of the rare instances that a B-side for a single has charted higher than the single itself on release due to downloads, with "Suck It and See" reaching number 149 and "Evil Twin" reaching number 114 on the UK Singles Chart.

== Background ==
Turner started writing the song, while working on the recording of the Submarine soundtrack. Turner described the melody and the chorus as "quite Beach Boys-y" which he was listening to a lot at the time. They chose it as the title track towards the end of the recording. The song contains a reference to the English beverage Dandelion and burdock. Of the reference, Turner said, "Something I like the idea of is putting colloquialisms where they feel strange – especially in some of the other tunes like the fuzzy, heavier ones, it feels quite funny when you can drop in something very British next to ‘Raw Power’ guitars." For a while the band thought of calling the track "I'm a Fool for You".

== Live performances ==
"Suck It and See" was first played live at an acoustic set for 102.1 the Edge in Toronto on 22 May 2011, and performed for a full audience a day later, at their concert in Montreal, Canada. The song was performed throughout their 2011–2012 tour, generally towards the end of the setlist. It was also played during the AM Tour. After an eight-year absence, "Suck It and See" was brought back for The Car Tour on 24 April 2023, at their concert in TipsArena Linz, Austria.

B-side "Evil Twin", had its live debut at their show on 4 October 2011, at The Pageant in St. Louis. The song was played numerous times throughout 2011–2012 and the AM Tour. During their show at The O2 Arena in London, on 29 October 2012, Alex Turner introduced the song by dedicating it to friend and fellow Last Shadow Puppets' band member Miles Kane. He did the same three months later, at their concert in Melbourne's Festival Hall where he said: "Wanna play this new song its called "Evil Twin", dedicated to Mr. Miles Kane, cause he's mine."

== Music video ==
The music video for the single premiered on 16 September 2011 and for "Evil Twin" premiered on 27 October 2011 on YouTube. Both videos were directed by Focus Creeps, and are the first, and second parts of a trilogy that ends with "Black Treacle." The video for "Suck It and See" tells a narrative story of a biker (drummer Matt Helders) and his relationship with a lover, portrayed by American model Breana McDow. The video is set in California and mocks the macho nature of American biker culture. It has also been suggested that the video is a tongue-in-cheek response to criticism that the band's sound has become too "Americanised". Alex Turner briefly appears in a cameo. The video for Evil Twin, features more scenes of the characters in the desert, interspersed with footage of McDow and Helders on vacation. The shot of the single cover can be seen during the video.

Aaron Brown of Focus Creeps said the video was inspired by a documentary on the life of musician Ian "Lemmy" Kilmister. In it, Lemmy tells the story of his first true love, a girl he dated when he was seventeen, who later died of a heroin overdose. Based on this story, they created the storyline around what would have happened if the girl never died, and they actually became "outlaw lovers, riding motorcycles, and you know, breaking the law and stuff."

== Track listing ==
All lyrics are written by Alex Turner; all music is composed by Arctic Monkeys

7" and digital download
No.	Title	Length
1.	"Suck It and See"	3:45
2.	"Evil Twin"	3:23

== Charts ==
Chart (2011)	Peak position
Belgium (Ultratip Bubbling Under Flanders)	20
Belgium (Ultratip Bubbling Under Wallonia)	42
UK Singles (Official Charts Company)	149
UK Indie (OCC)	20

Chart (2017)	Peak position
Bolivia (Monitor Latino)	4

== Certifications ==
Region	Certification	Certified units/sales
United Kingdom (BPI)	Silver	200,000^{‡}
^{‡} Sales+streaming figures based on certification alone.
