= When the Sun Goes Down (Arctic Monkeys song) =

2006 single by Arctic Monkeys

Single by Arctic Monkeys

from the album Whatever People Say I Am, That's What I'm Not
- B-side: "Stickin to the Floor"; "Settle for a Draw"; "7"
- Released: 16 January 2006
- Studio: The Chapel (Lincolnshire, England)
- Genre: Indie rock; garage rock; post-punk
- Length: 3:20
- Label: Domino
- Songwriter: Alex Turner
- Producer: Jim Abbiss

Arctic Monkeys singles chronology
"I Bet You Look Good on the Dancefloor" (2005)	"When the Sun Goes Down" (2006)	"The View from the Afternoon" (2006)

Music video
- "When the Sun Goes Down" on YouTube

"When the Sun Goes Down" is a song by English indie rock band Arctic Monkeys. It was released on 16 January 2006 as the second single from their debut studio album, Whatever People Say I Am, That's What I'm Not (2006). It followed debut single "I Bet You Look Good on the Dancefloor" to number one on the UK Singles Chart.

The song is about prostitution in the Neepsend district of Sheffield. Originally known as "Scummy", early reports had also suggested its name would be simply "Sun Goes Down", but the full name was confirmed on Arctic Monkeys' website.

== Composition and lyrics ==
"When the Sun Goes Down" is composed in the key of B major with a time signature of 4/4 (common-time), and follows a tempo of 169 beats per minute.

The song's lyrics tell a story narrated from the point of view of a concerned individual who is approached by a scantily-clad girl, heavily implied to be a prostitute. He then observes a "scummy man" who has been hanging around the neighbourhood; the man is implied to be either the prostitute's pimp or a 'client' who is picking her up for sex. This section of the song musically consists of just vocalist Alex Turner singing accompanied by a pattern of electric guitar chords with a conspicuously clean tone. After the line "I said he's a scumbag don't you know" the song then changes drastically into a heavy rock style with a fast beat and driving guitar riff which is also played identically on the bass guitar. In the song's lyrics, now delivered a lot more venomously, the prostitute propositions the song's narrator and he turns her down politely; he then observes the "scummy man" arriving to pick her up in a Ford Mondeo. The girl is "delighted when she sees him" because "she must be fucking freezing, scantily clad beneath the clear night sky".

The song's chorus consists of the repeated line "they said it changes when the sun goes down around here", noting the stark difference between the appearance of the city at daytime and the dark prostitution trade the narrator observes at night. After the second refrain of the chorus, the song reverts to the style of the introduction. The last line, "I hope you're not involved at all", is either the narrator expressing his disappointment that the girl has turned to prostitution or a warning to the person to whom the narrator is telling the story, who also may be involved with the scummy man – or the listener themselves.

The line "and he told Roxanne to put on her red light" is a reference to the Police song "Roxanne", which is also about prostitution.

== Critical reception ==
On the single's B-side, Alfie Sansom from Argus Far described ‘Settle For A Draw’ as a "slower, cooler track, even if it sounds like it should be a Little Man Tate single." He continues to add that both ‘Stickin To The Floor’ and ‘7’ have the "frenetic energy and skidding riffs of the band’s original demo tapes, Beneath the Boardwalk, but lack the finesse of the album tracks".

== Music video ==
The song's music video was directed by Paul Fraser and premiered on MTV2 on 21 December 2005. It starred Lauren Socha and Stephen Graham. The video used footage from a longer film, Scummy Man, which used the same actors who appeared in the music video to tell the story of 'Nina', the nameless "that girl there" from the song.

== Track listings ==
All tracks written by Alex Turner.

UK 7-inch single
No.	Title	Length
1.	"When the Sun Goes Down"
2.	"Settle for a Draw"

European CD single
No.	Title	Length
1.	"When the Sun Goes Down"
2.	"Stickin to the Floor"
3.	"7"

US 12-inch EP
No.	Title	Length
1.	"When the Sun Goes Down"
2.	"Stickin to the Floor"
3.	"Settle for a Draw"
4.	"7"

== Personnel ==
Credits taken from Whatever People Say I Am, That's What I'm Not liner notes.

Arctic Monkeys

- Alex Turner
- Jamie Cook
- Andy Nicholson
- Matt Helders

Technical

- Jim Abbiss – production, recording
- Ewan Davies – recording
- Alan Smyth – additional recording
- Simon 'Barny' Barnicott – mixing
- Owen Skinner – mixing assistance
- George Marino – mastering

== Charts ==
=== Weekly charts ===
Chart (2006)	Peak position
Australia (ARIA)	26
Belgium (Ultratip Bubbling Under Flanders)	12
Belgium (Ultratip Bubbling Under Wallonia)	15
Europe (Eurochart Hot 100)	6
Germany (GfK)	89
Ireland (IRMA)	11
Netherlands (Dutch Top 40 Tipparade)	14
Netherlands (Single Top 100)	72
Scotland Singles (OCC)	1
UK Singles (OCC)	1
UK Indie (OCC)	1
U.S. Hot Singles Sales (Billboard)	2

=== Year-end charts ===
Chart (2006)	Position
UK Singles (OCC)	51

== Certifications ==
Region	Certification	Certified units/sales
Canada (Music Canada)	Gold	40,000^{‡}
Denmark (IFPI Danmark)	Gold	45,000^{‡}
New Zealand (RMNZ)	Platinum	30,000^{‡}
Spain (Promusicae)	Gold	30,000^{‡}
United Kingdom (BPI)	3× Platinum	1,800,000^{‡}
United States (RIAA)	Gold	500,000^{‡}
^{‡} Sales+streaming figures based on certification alone.

== Release history ==
Region	Date	Format(s)	Label(s)	Ref.
United Kingdom	16 January 2006	7-inch vinyl; CD	Domino	
Australia	8 May 2006	CD	Domino	
