= Teddy Picker =

2007 single by Arctic Monkeys

Single by Arctic Monkeys

from the album Favourite Worst Nightmare
- Released: 3 December 2007 (UK)
- Recorded: December 2006
- Studio: Miloco (London); Motor Museum (Liverpool)
- Genre: Post-punk; garage rock
- Length: 2:43
- Label: Domino
- Composers: Jamie Cook; Matt Helders; Nick O'Malley; Alex Turner
- Lyricist: Alex Turner
- Producers: James Ford; Mike Crossey

Arctic Monkeys singles chronology
"Fluorescent Adolescent" (2007)	"Teddy Picker" (2007)	"Crying Lightning" (2009)

Music video
- "Teddy Picker" on YouTube

"Teddy Picker" is a song by the English indie rock band Arctic Monkeys, released as the third single from their second album Favourite Worst Nightmare. It was released on 3 December 2007 in the United Kingdom. The song entered the UK Singles Chart at number 20.

== Music video ==
The video was directed by Roman Coppola, who has previously worked with The Strokes, Daft Punk and Phoenix. The whole video was completed in one day and features the band performing the song live in RAK Studios, London and walking to a local pub. It also won them Best Video at the 2008 NME Awards.

== Track listing ==
CD, 10"
No.	Title	Lyrics	Music	Length
1.	"Teddy Picker"	Alex Turner	Arctic Monkeys	2:43
2.	"Bad Woman" (featuring Richard Hawley)	Patrick Sickafus	Death Ramps	2:18
3.	"The Death Ramps"		Death Ramps	3:19
4.	"Nettles"	Turner	Arctic Monkeys	1:45

7"
No.	Title	Lyrics	Music	Length
1.	"Teddy Picker"	Turner	Arctic Monkeys	2:43
2.	"Bad Woman" (featuring Richard Hawley)	Patrick Sickafus	Arctic Monkeys	2:18

== Personnel ==
Personnel taken from Favourite Worst Nightmare liner notes.

Arctic Monkeys

- Alex Turner
- Jamie Cook
- Nick O'Malley
- Matt Helders

Technical personnel

- Mike Crossey – production, mixing
- James Ford – production, mixing
- George Marino – mastering

== Charts ==
Chart (2007)	Peak position
French Singles Chart	99
Irish Singles Chart	32
Italian Singles Chart	35
Netherlands Singles Chart	98
UK Singles Chart	20
UK Indie Chart	1

== Certifications ==
Region	Certification	Certified units/sales
New Zealand (RMNZ)	Gold	15,000^{‡}
United Kingdom (BPI)	Platinum	600,000^{‡}
^{‡} Sales+streaming figures based on certification alone.
