= Matt Helders =

English musician (born 1986)

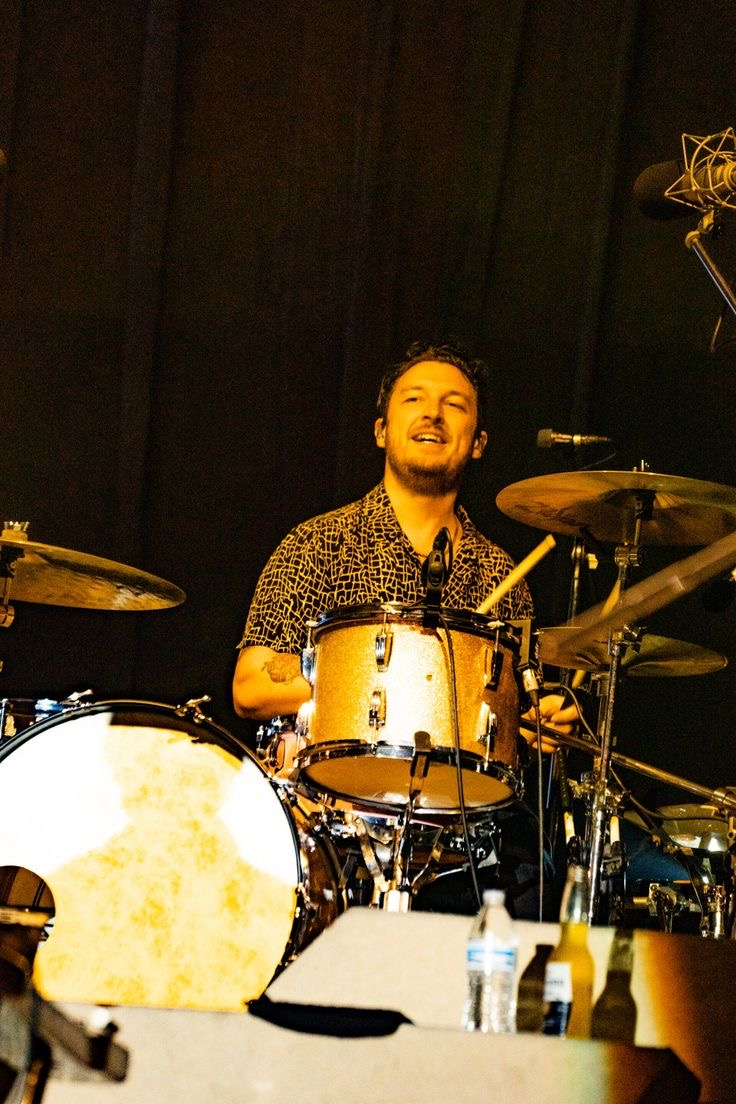
- Helders performing with Arctic Monkeys in 2022

Background information
- Also known as: Matthew J. Helders III; Agile Beast
- Born: Matthew Helders; 7 May 1986 (age 40); Sheffield, South Yorkshire, England
- Occupations: Musician; singer; songwriter
- Spouses: Breana McDow (m. 2016; div. 2019); Amanda Blank (m. 2023)
- Musical career
- Genres: Indie rock; post-punk revival; psychedelic rock; garage rock; house
- Instruments: Drums; vocals
- Years active: 2002–present
- Label: Domino
- Member of: Arctic Monkeys
- Formerly of: Mongrel

Matthew Helders (born 7 May 1986) is an English musician, singer, and songwriter, who is the drummer and occasional singer of the rock band Arctic Monkeys. He has also released a studio album and collaborated with artists such as Dean Fertita, Josh Homme and Iggy Pop.

== Career ==
The most comprehensive backing vocalist of the group, Helders's vocals have been featured on many of the band's songs. He often sings in response to or in harmony with lead singer Alex Turner, and sings lead or co-lead vocals on "D Is for Dangerous", "Brick by Brick", and "I.D.S.T.", as well as on parts of "You Probably Couldn't See for the Lights but You Were Staring Straight at Me", "Who the Fuck Are Arctic Monkeys?" and "Teddy Picker".

Helders released his own clothing line, consisting of a jacket, a zip hood and three T-shirts. The garments went on sale in May 2007 with sales accompanied by a CD featuring an Arctic Monkeys remix by Helders and Supremebeing designer Skuff. £1 from each sale was to go to the Arthur Rank Hospice.

In 2008, Helders remixed "T.H.E.H.I.V.E.S", the Hives's fourth single from The Black and White Album, and "Skin Divers", Duran Duran's second single from Red Carpet Massacre. He played a few TV shows with We Are Scientists in the UK as well as remixing their second single "Chick Lit" as a B-side for the vinyl release. He is featured on Toddla T's album Skanky Skanky. He remixed "Again & Again" for Roots Manuva, which gained airplay from Zane Lowe on BBC Radio 1. In August 2008, it was announced that Helders would compile the latest release in the LateNightTales DJ mix CD series. The set, entitled Late Night Tales: Matt Helders, was released on 27 October 2008 and included a spoken work track performed and written by bandmate Alex Turner.

Helders recorded the drum tracks on Post Pop Depression, written by Iggy Pop and Josh Homme, which was released on 18 March 2016. Helders toured with them to support the album. He played on American singer Lady Gaga's 2016 album Joanne.

In 2018, Helders produced for Milburn frontman Joe Carnall on his new project, released under the moniker Good Cop Bad Cop, with an eponymous album being released on 29 March 2019, and a tour following, although Helders himself was not present at any of the gigs.

In September 2025, Helders announced the release of a track, "WeHo", as part of a new band with Mini Mansions frontman Tyler Parkford called Terrific.

== Artistry ==
Helders has said that he ended up playing drums as "that was the only thing left. When we started the band none of us played anything. We just put it together. They all had guitars and I bought a drum kit after a bit." However, Helders has mentioned the influence rap music has had on the band, saying "We were rap fans at school more than now ... it still influences us in some ways; like for me, it's the drummin'. The groove element, like foon-keh music." In addition, Helders cites seeing Queens of the Stone Age as the biggest influence on his development as a drummer, saying "the one thing that changed me the most was seeing Queens of the Stone Age live at a festival ... as soon as they came off I was like – 'Fuck, I need to start hitting harder.'"

Helders explained the band's insistence on singing in their native Sheffield accent, saying, "when you talk between the songs at a gig and you're speakin' English in our normal accent, it seems a bit strange when you burst into song like you're from California or something ... it looks a bit daft."

In a similar fashion to other members of the band, Helders has remained true to his hometown roots, suggesting that seeing places all over the world makes him more appreciative of Sheffield, which still provides the basis for the band's lyrics. "And all around you, there's still plenty of things to write about. Touring lets you see a lot of places that you realise you wouldn't want to live in ... and when you come home, it's pretty easy to slip into your old ways, to all the places you've always gone." Helders also points out that despite the fame of the band, he can still avoid being mobbed in the street – "If we all go out together at night clubbing, it's difficult, but alone you don't get recognised much." In ode to his Sheffield roots, Helders can sometimes be seen with the numbers "0114" on the front of his drum kit, which is the dialling code of his native Sheffield.

Helders prefers playing the drums wearing a comfortable pair of 'joggers' instead of jeans "due to movement and sweat." Helders says "You don't want to sweat in your jeans and wear them the next day. Some people will call that rock and roll. I just call it unhygienic."

== Personal life ==
Helders started dating model Breana McDow in 2011, after they met on the set of the music video for Arctic Monkeys' single Suck It and See, and became engaged in 2013. In October 2015, the couple had a daughter, resulting in their wedding being pushed for a year. Helders and McDow finally got married in Rome on June 11, 2016. In early 2019, Helders filed for divorce from McDow. In 2021, Helders started dating American rapper Amanda Blank. They had first met in Brazil in 2007, after Blank had played a show with Arctic Monkeys. Helders and Blank got married in September 2023, during the Arctic Monkeys' U.S. tour.

Helders lives in Los Angeles. He became interested in photography as a child, but did not start taking pictures seriously until he began touring with the band. Helders mostly shoots on film, and often uses a Leica M6, having used a Contax G2 and Canonet in the past. When shooting digital he uses a Sony α7. He is inspired by William Eggleston. One of his pictures was used as the artwork for The Car (2022).

== Discography ==
=== Studio albums ===
Solo albums

- Late Night Tales: Matt Helders (2008)

With Arctic Monkeys

- Whatever People Say I Am, That's What I'm Not (2006)
- Favourite Worst Nightmare (2007)
- Humbug (2009)
- Suck It and See (2011)
- AM (2013)
- Tranquility Base Hotel & Casino (2018)
- The Car (2022)

With Mongrel

- Better Than Heavy (2009)

With Iggy Pop

- Iggy Pop – Post Pop Depression (2016)

=== Singles ===
As lead artist

- "Dreamer" (2008)

As performer

- Toddla T – "Boom Dj From The Steel City" (2009)
- Toddla T – "Better" (2009)
- The Last Shadow Puppets – Everything You've Come to Expect (2016)
- Lady Gaga – "Diamond Heart" (2016)
- Good Cop Bad Cop – Good Cop Bad Cop (2019)

=== Other credits ===
Producer

- Good Cop Bad Cop – Good Cop Bad Cop (2019)

Remixes

- The Hives – "We Rule The World (T.H.E.H.I.V.E.S.)" (2008)
- We Are Scientists – "Chick Lit" (2008)
- Roots Manuva – "Again & Again" (2008)
- Duran Duran – "Skin Divers" (2008)
- Yo Majesty – "Club Action" (2009)
- Wet Nuns – "Don't Wanna See Your Face" (2011)
- Paul Weller – "That Dangerous Age" (2011)

== Filmography ==
- Scummy Man (2006)
