= Arctic Monkeys discography =

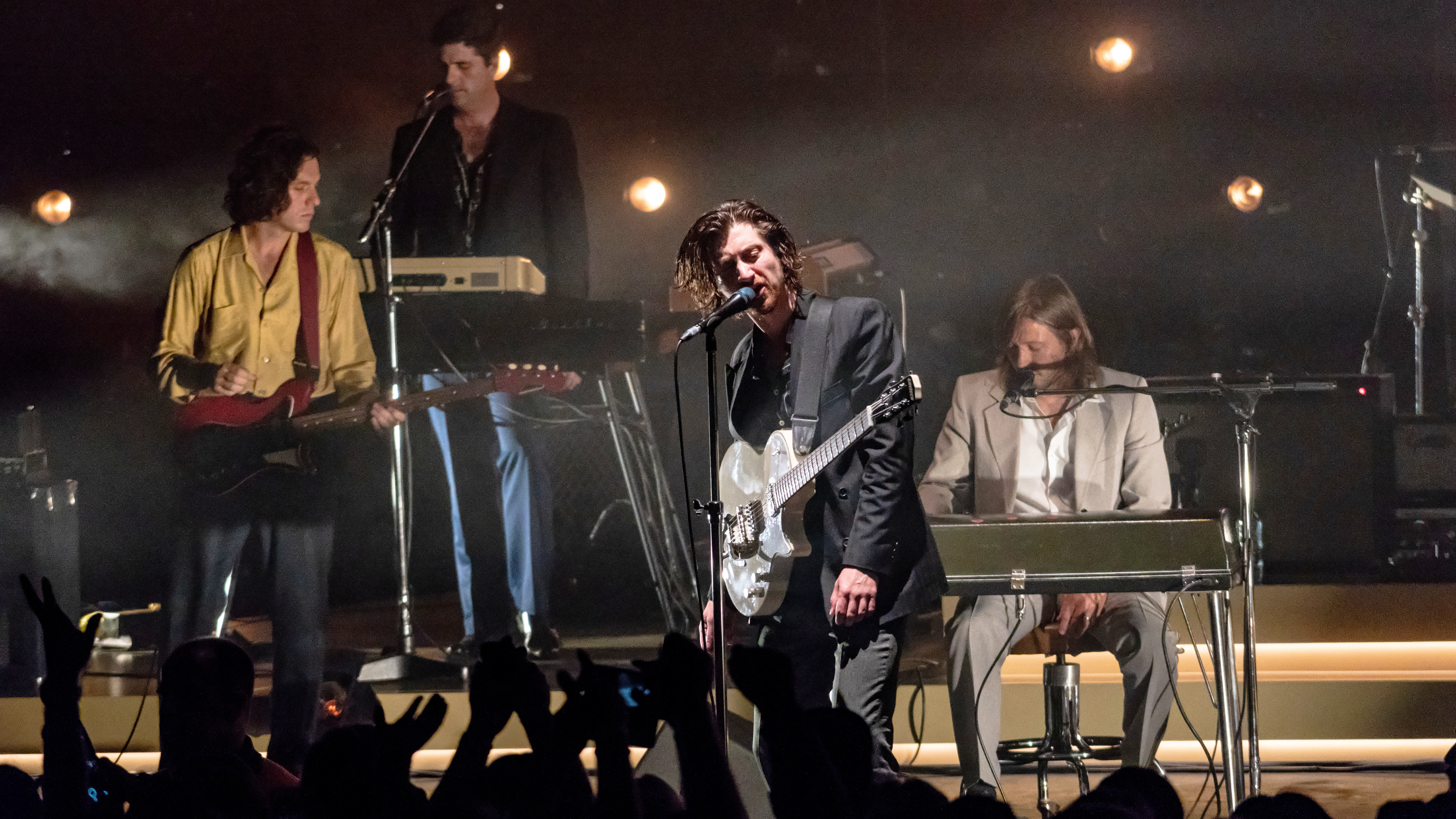
- Arctic Monkeys performing at the Royal Albert Hall in 2018
- Studio albums: 7
- Extended plays: 5
- Singles: 23
- Video albums: 2
- Music videos: 24

English rock band Arctic Monkeys have released seven studio albums, five extended plays, two video albums, 24 music videos and 23 singles. Formed in 2002 by guitarist and vocalist Alex Turner, guitarist and backing vocalist Jamie Cook, bass guitarist and backing vocalist Andy Nicholson and drummer and backing vocalist Matt Helders, Arctic Monkeys released their first EP, Five Minutes with Arctic Monkeys, in May 2005, and signed with London-based Domino Recording Company in June.

The band's first two singles on Domino, "I Bet You Look Good on the Dancefloor" and "When the Sun Goes Down", both peaked at number one on the UK Singles Chart. Their debut studio album, Whatever People Say I Am, That's What I'm Not, followed in January 2006 and reached number one on the UK Albums Chart, the Irish Albums Chart and the Australian Albums Chart. The British Phonographic Industry (BPI) certified the album seven times platinum. The band released a second EP, Who the Fuck Are Arctic Monkeys?, which was their last to be recorded with Nicholson, in April 2006; Nicholson officially departed in June, replaced by Nick O'Malley. Their first single after Nicholson's departure, "Leave Before the Lights Come On", reached number four on the UK Singles Chart.

Arctic Monkeys released their second studio album, Favourite Worst Nightmare, in April 2007. Favourite Worst Nightmare peaked atop the UK Albums Chart and the Irish Albums Chart. In the United States, the album peaked at number seven on the Billboard 200, their first top-ten entry. Two singles from the album, "Brianstorm" and "Fluorescent Adolescent", reached the top five on the UK Singles Chart. The band followed with their third studio album, Humbug, which was released in August 2009. Peaking atop the UK Albums Chart and the Irish Albums Chart, Humbug was preceded by the lead single "Crying Lightning", which reached number 12 on the UK Singles Chart. Their fourth studio album, Suck It and See (2011), was their fourth UK Albums Chart number one.

Arctic Monkeys' fifth studio album, AM (2013), peaked atop the Irish Albums Chart, the Australian Albums Chart and the New Zealand Albums Chart. In the United Kingdom, AM made Arctic Monkeys the first independent label band to earn five number-one albums and was certified four times platinum by the BPI. It earned platinum certifications by the Australian Recording Industry Association (ARIA; double platinum), the Irish Recorded Music Association (IRMA), the Recorded Music NZ (RMNZ) and the Recording Industry Association of America (RIAA). AM's second single, "Do I Wanna Know?", was the band's first to be certified triple platinum by the BPI and platinum by the RIAA. Its third single, "Why'd You Only Call Me When You're High?", reached the UK Singles Chart top ten. The band's sixth studio album, Tranquility Base Hotel & Casino (2018), peaked atop the UK Albums Chart. Their seventh album, The Car (2022), peaked at number two on the UK Albums Chart, behind Taylor Swift's Midnights. In the US, the album landed at number six on the Billboard 200.

== Albums ==
=== Studio albums ===
List of studio albums, with selected chart positions and certifications
Title	Album details	Peak chart positions										Sales	Certifications
Title	Album details	UK	AUS	BEL	CAN	FRA	GER	IRL	JPN	NLD	US	Sales	Certifications
Whatever People Say I Am, That's What I'm Not	Released: 23 January 2006; Label: Domino; Format: CD, LP, download	1	1	9	16	17	20	1	9	8	24	UK: 2,500,000 (Note: United Kingdom sales figures for Whatever People Say I Am, That's What I'm Not as of October 2025.)	BPI: 8× Platinum; ARIA: Platinum; MC: Gold; RIAA: Platinum; RIAJ: Gold
Favourite Worst Nightmare	Released: 23 April 2007; Label: Domino; Format: CD, LP, download	1	2	3	4	6	2	1	4	1	7	UK: 1,400,000 (Note: United Kingdom sales figures for Favourite Worst Nightmare as of October 2025.)	BPI: 5× Platinum; ARIA: Gold; RIAJ: Gold
Humbug	Released: 19 August 2009; Label: Domino; Format: CD, LP, download	1	2	1	6	2	4	1	4	2	15	UK: 513,000 (Note: United Kingdom sales figures for Humbug as of October 2025.)	BPI: Platinum; MC: Gold
Suck It and See	Released: 6 June 2011; Label: Domino; Format: CD, LP, download	1	4	2	12	7	10	3	12	6	14	UK: 512,000 (Note: United Kingdom sales figures for Suck It and See as of October 2025.)	BPI: Platinum
AM	Released: 6 September 2013; Label: Domino; Format: CD, LP, download	1	1	1	3	4	3	1	10	1	6	UK: 2,200,000 (Note: United Kingdom sales figures for AM as of October 2025.); US: 655,000 (Note: United States sales figures for Tranquility Base Hotel & Casino as of February 2015.)	BPI: 8× Platinum; ARIA: 2× Platinum; BRMA: Gold; IRMA: Platinum; MC: 5× Platinum; NVPI: Platinum; RIAA: 4× Platinum; SNEP: Platinum
Tranquility Base Hotel & Casino	Released: 11 May 2018; Label: Domino; Format: CD, LP, CS, download	1	1	1	4	1	4	2	9	1	8	UK: 287,000 (Note: United Kingdom sales figures for Tranquility Base Hotel & Casino as of October 2025.)	BPI: Gold
The Car	Released: 21 October 2022; Label: Domino; Format: CD, LP, cassette, streaming	2	2	2	6	2	5	2	18	2	6	UK: 231,000 (Note: United Kingdom sales figures for The Car as of October 2025.)	BPI: Gold

=== Live albums ===
List of live albums, with selected chart positions and certifications
Title	Album details	Peak chart positions										Certifications
Title	Album details	UK	AUS	BEL	FRA	GER	IRL	JPN	NLD	POR	US	Certifications
At the Apollo	Released: 3 November 2008; Label: Domino; Formats: DVD	— (Note: At the Apollo did not enter the UK Albums Chart, but peaked at number three on the UK Official Music Video Chart Top 50.)	—	— (Note: At the Apollo did not enter the Flanders Ultratop 200 Albums, but peaked at number eight on the Muziek-DVD chart.)	—	—	—	— (Note: At the Apollo did not enter the Japan Albums Chart, but peaked at number 36 on the Japan DVD Sales chart.)	— (Note: At the Apollo did not enter the Netherlands' Album Top 100 but peaked on the Netherlands' DVD Music Chart at number seven.)	—	— (Note: "At the Apollo" did not enter the Billboard 200, but peaked at number 38 on the Music Video Sales chart.)	BPI: Gold
Live at the Royal Albert Hall	Released: 4 December 2020; Label: Domino; Formats: Double vinyl, CD, digital download	3	4	5	67	50	15	66	5	2	151	BPI: Silver
"—" denotes a recording that did not chart or was not released in that territory.

=== Other albums ===
Title	Album details
Beneath the Boardwalk	Demo album; Released: 2004; Self-released and distributed

== Extended plays ==
List of extended plays, with selected chart positions
Title	Extended play details	Peak chart positions							
Title	Extended play details	UK	AUS	DEN	IRL	FRA	GER	JPN	SWE
Five Minutes with Arctic Monkeys	Released: 30 May 2005; Label: Bang Bang Recordings Limited; Format: CD, LP	—	—	—	—	—	—	—	—
Who the Fuck Are Arctic Monkeys?	Released: 24 April 2006; Label: Domino; Format: CD, LP	— (Note: Due to its length, Who the Fuck Are Arctic Monkeys? was ineligible to chart as a UK single or album.)	37	2	2	52	79	137	58
iTunes Festival: London 2011	Released: 22 July 2011; Format: Download	—	—	—	—	—	—	—	—
"—" denotes a recording that did not chart or was not released in that territory.

== Singles ==
List of singles, with selected chart positions, showing year released as single and album name
Title	Year	Peak chart positions										Certifications	Album
Title	Year	UK	AUS	BEL	CAN	FRA	IRL	JPN	NLD	POR	US	Certifications	Album
"I Bet You Look Good on the Dancefloor"	2005	1	18	— (Note: "I Bet You Look Good on the Dancefloor" did not enter the Flanders Ultratop 50, but peaked at number 17 on the Ultratip chart.)	—	100	12	61	99	—	— (Note: "I Bet You Look Good on the Dancefloor" did not enter the Billboard Hot 100, but peaked at number 18 on the Bubbling Under Hot 100 Singles chart.)	BPI: 5× Platinum; MC: Platinum; RIAA: Platinum	Whatever People Say I Am, That's What I'm Not
"When the Sun Goes Down"	2006	1	26	— (Note: "When the Sun Goes Down" did not enter the Flanders Ultratop 50, but peaked at number 12 on the Ultratip chart.)	—	—	11	52	72	—	— (Note: "When the Sun Goes Down" did not enter the Billboard Hot 100, but peaked at number two on the Hot Singles Sales chart.)	BPI: 4× Platinum; MC: Gold; RIAA: Gold	Whatever People Say I Am, That's What I'm Not
"Leave Before the Lights Come On"	2006	4	81	—	—	—	16	57	—	—	— (Note: "Leave Before the Lights Come On" did not enter the Billboard Hot 100, but peaked at number four on the Hot Singles Sales chart.)	BPI: Silver	Non-album single
"Brianstorm"	2007	2	67	— (Note: "Brianstorm" did not enter the Flanders Ultratop 50, but peaked at number nine on the Ultratip chart.)	53	44	7	24	36	—	— (Note: "Brianstorm" did not enter the Billboard Hot 100, but peaked at number 14 on the Bubbling Under Hot 100 Singles chart.)	BPI: Platinum	Favourite Worst Nightmare
"Matador" / "Da Frame 2R"	2007	—	—	—	—	—	—	—	—	—	—		Non-album single
"Fluorescent Adolescent"	2007	5	—	— (Note: "Fluorescent Adolescent" did not enter the Flanders Ultratop 50, but peaked at number seven on the Ultratip chart.)	—	88	12	61	—	—	— (Note: "Fluorescent Adolescent" did not enter the Billboard Hot 100, but peaked at number 15 on the Hot Singles Sales chart.)	BPI: 5× Platinum	Favourite Worst Nightmare
"Teddy Picker"	2007	20	—	— (Note: "Teddy Picker" did not enter the Flanders Ultratop 50, but peaked at number 25 on the Ultratip chart.)	—	99	32	116	98	—	—	BPI: Platinum	Favourite Worst Nightmare
"Crying Lightning"	2009	12	—	— (Note: "Crying Lightning" did not enter the Flanders Ultratop 50, but peaked at number 13 on the Ultratip chart.)	—	23	—	44	—	—	— (Note: "Crying Lightning" did not enter the Billboard Hot 100, but peaked at number 15 on the Hot Singles Sales chart.)	BPI: Platinum; MC: Gold; RIAA: Gold	Humbug
"Cornerstone"	2009	94	99	— (Note: "Cornerstone" did not enter the Flanders Ultratop 50, but peaked at number 18 on the Ultratip chart.)	—	42	—	—	—	—	— (Note: "Cornerstone" did not enter the Billboard Hot 100, but peaked at number 20 on the Hot Singles Sales chart.)	BPI: Gold	Humbug
"My Propeller"	2010	90	—	— (Note: "My Propeller" did not enter the Flanders Ultratop 50, but peaked at number seven on the Ultratip chart.)	—	56	—	—	—	—	— (Note: "My Propeller" did not enter the Billboard Hot 100, but peaked at number six on the Hot Singles Sales chart.)	BPI: Silver	Humbug
"Don't Sit Down 'Cause I've Moved Your Chair"	2011	28	—	50	—	—	—	—	55	—	—	BPI: Gold	Suck It and See
"The Hellcat Spangled Shalalala"	2011	167	—	— (Note: "The Hellcat Spangled Shalalala" did not enter the Flanders Ultratop 50, but peaked at number 15 on the Ultratip chart.)	—	—	—	15	—	—	—		Suck It and See
"Suck It and See"	2011	149	—	— (Note: "Suck It and See" did not enter the Flanders Ultratop 50, but peaked at number 20 on the Ultratip chart.)	—	—	—	—	—	—	—	BPI: Silver	Suck It and See
"Black Treacle"	2012	173	—	— (Note: "Black Treacle" did not enter the Flanders Ultratop 50, but peaked at number 22 on the Ultratip chart.)	—	—	—	—	—	—	—	BPI: Silver	Suck It and See
"R U Mine?"	2012	23	94	— (Note: "R U Mine?" did not enter the Flanders Ultratop 50, but peaked at number 11 on the Ultratip chart.)	—	147	65	—	—	94	— (Note: "R U Mine?" did not enter the Billboard Hot 100, but peaked at number 22 on the Bubbling Under Hot 100 Singles chart.)	BPI: 4× Platinum; MC: 3× Platinum; RIAA: 3× Platinum	AM
"Do I Wanna Know?"	2013	11	37	33	48	45	14	—	62	33	70	BPI: 7× Platinum; AFP: 4× Platinum; ARIA: Platinum; BRMA: Gold; MC: Diamond; RIAA: 9× Platinum	AM
"Why'd You Only Call Me When You're High?"	2013	8	56	31	87	164	24	42	—	67	—	BPI: 4× Platinum; AFP: 2× Platinum; ARIA: Gold; MC: 7× Platinum; RIAA: 5× Platinum	AM
"One for the Road"	2013	112	—	— (Note: "One for the Road" did not enter the Flanders Ultratop 50, but peaked at number 76 on the Ultratip chart.)	—	—	—	—	—	—	— (Note: "One for the Road" did not enter the Billboard Hot 100, but peaked at number 20 on the Hot Singles Sales chart.)	BPI: Platinum; MC: Gold; RIAA: Gold	AM
"Arabella"	2014	70	—	— (Note: "Arabella" did not enter the Flanders Ultratop 50, but peaked at number seven on the Ultratip chart.)	—	—	—	—	—	—	—	BPI: 2× Platinum; MC: 2× Platinum; RIAA: Platinum	AM
"Snap Out of It"	2014	82	—	— (Note: "Snap Out of It" did not enter the Flanders Ultratop 50, but peaked at number two on the Ultratip chart.)	—	—	68	—	—	—	—	BPI: 2× Platinum; MC: 2× Platinum; RIAA: Platinum	AM
"Four Out of Five"	2018	18	80	45	—	—	30	—	— (Note: "Four Out of Five" did not enter the Netherlands' Single Top 100 but peaked on the Netherlands' Single Tip Chart at number 7.)	12	—	BPI: Gold	Tranquility Base Hotel & Casino
"Tranquility Base Hotel & Casino"	2018	— (Note: "Tranquility Base Hotel & Casino" did not enter the UK Official Singles Chart Top 100 but peaked on the Official UK Singles Sales Chart at number 20.)	—	— (Note: "Tranquility Base Hotel & Casino" did not enter the Flanders Ultratop 50, but peaked at number seven on the Ultratip chart.)	—	—	49	—	—	22	—	BPI: Silver	Tranquility Base Hotel & Casino
"There'd Better Be a Mirrorball"	2022	25	—	—	—	—	31	—	— (Note: "There'd Better Be a Mirrorball" did not enter the Netherlands' Single Top 100 but peaked on the Netherlands' Single Tip Chart at number 12.)	68	—	BPI: Silver	The Car
"Body Paint"	2022	22	—	—	—	—	44	—	—	54	—	BPI: Silver	The Car
"I Ain't Quite Where I Think I Am"	2022	23	—	—	—	—	30	— (Note: "I Ain't Quite Where I Think I Am" did not enter the Billboard Japan Hot 100 chart, but peaked at number 20 on the Billboard Japan Hot Overseas Songs chart.)	— (Note: "I Ain't Quite Where I Think I Am" did not enter the Netherlands' Single Top 100 but peaked on the Netherlands' Single Tip Chart at number five.)	—	—		The Car
"Opening Night"	2026	16	—	35	—	—	37	— (Note: "Opening Night" did not enter the Billboard Japan Hot 100 chart, but peaked at number 15 on the Billboard Japan Hot Overseas Songs chart.)	— (Note: "Opening Night" did not enter the Netherlands' Single Top 100 but peaked on the Netherlands' Single Tip Chart at number 25.)	102	—		Help(2)
"—" denotes a recording that did not chart or was not released in that territory.

=== Promotional singles ===
List of promotional singles, with selected chart positions, showing year released as single and album name
Title	Year	Peak chart positions				Certifications	Album
Title	Year	UK	BEL	CAN Rock	POR	Certifications	Album
"Bigger Boys and Stolen Sweethearts"	2005	—	—	—	—	BPI: Gold	"I Bet You Look Good on the Dancefloor" single
"The View from the Afternoon"	2006	— (Note: "The View from the Afternoon" did not enter the UK Official Singles Chart Top 100 but peaked on the Official UK Singles Downloads Chart at number 75.)	—	—	—	BPI: Gold	Whatever People Say I Am, That's What I'm Not
"Fake Tales of San Francisco"	2006	—	—	43	—	BPI: Platinum	Whatever People Say I Am, That's What I'm Not
"This House Is a Circus"	2007	132	—	—	—		Favourite Worst Nightmare
"505" (Live)	2020	—	— (Note: "505" (Live) did not enter the Flanders Ultratop 50, but peaked at number 38 on the Ultratip chart.)	—	155		Live at the Royal Albert Hall
"Arabella" (Live)	2020	—	— (Note: "Arabella" (Live) did not enter the Flanders Ultratop 50, but charted as an "extra tip" on the Ultratip chart.)	—	—		Live at the Royal Albert Hall
"—" denotes a recording that did not chart or was not released in that territory.

== Other charted and certified songs ==
List of songs, with selected chart positions and certifications, showing year released and album name
Title	Year	Peak chart positions										Certifications	Release
Title	Year	UK	CZ	GRE	IRL	NLD	POR	SWE	SWI	US Bub.	WW	Certifications	Release
"Settle for a Draw"	2006	— (Note: "Settle for a Draw" did not enter the UK Official Singles Chart Top 100 but peaked on the Official UK Singles Downloads Chart at number 37.)	—	—	—	—	—	—	—	—	—		"When the Sun Goes Down" single
"Dancing Shoes"	2006	—	—	—	—	—	—	—	—	—	—	BPI: Gold	Whatever People Say I Am, That's What I'm Not
"You Probably Couldn't See for the Lights but You Were Staring Straight at Me"	2006	—	—	—	—	—	—	—	—	—	—	BPI: Silver	Whatever People Say I Am, That's What I'm Not
"Still Take You Home"	2006	—	—	—	—	—	—	—	—	—	—	BPI: Silver	Whatever People Say I Am, That's What I'm Not
"Riot Van"	2006	—	—	—	—	—	—	—	—	—	—	BPI: Silver	Whatever People Say I Am, That's What I'm Not
"Red Light Indicates Doors Are Secured"	2006	—	—	—	—	—	—	—	—	—	—	BPI: Silver	Whatever People Say I Am, That's What I'm Not
"Mardy Bum"	2006	123	—	—	—	—	—	—	—	—	—	BPI: 4× Platinum; RIAA: Gold	Whatever People Say I Am, That's What I'm Not
"Perhaps Vampires Is a Bit Strong But..."	2006	—	—	—	—	—	—	—	—	—	—	BPI: Silver	Whatever People Say I Am, That's What I'm Not
"From the Ritz to the Rubble"	2006	—	—	—	—	—	—	—	—	—	—	BPI: Platinum	Whatever People Say I Am, That's What I'm Not
"A Certain Romance"	2006	—	—	—	—	—	—	—	—	—	—	BPI: Platinum	Whatever People Say I Am, That's What I'm Not
"Baby I'm Yours"	2006	—	—	—	—	—	—	—	—	—	—	RIAA: Gold	"Leave Before the Lights Come On" single
"Cigarette Smoker Fiona"	2006	— (Note: "Cigarette Smoker Fiona" did not enter the UK Official Singles Chart Top 100 but peaked on the Official UK Singles Downloads Chart at number 50.)	—	—	—	—	—	—	—	—	—		Who the Fuck Are Arctic Monkeys?
"Despair in the Departure Lounge"	2006	— (Note: "Despair in the Departure Lounge" did not enter the UK Official Singles Chart Top 100 but peaked on the Official UK Singles Downloads Chart at number 47.)	—	—	—	—	—	—	—	—	—		Who the Fuck Are Arctic Monkeys?
"No Buses"	2006	— (Note: "No Buses" did not enter the UK Official Singles Chart Top 100 but peaked on the Official UK Singles Downloads Chart at number 49.)	—	—	—	—	—	—	—	—	—	BPI: Silver	Who the Fuck Are Arctic Monkeys?
"Who the Fuck Are Arctic Monkeys?"	2006	— (Note: "Who the Fuck Are Arctic Monkeys?" did not enter the UK Official Singles Chart Top 100 but peaked on the Official UK Singles Downloads Chart at number 36.)	—	—	5	—	—	58	—	—	—		Who the Fuck Are Arctic Monkeys?
"If You Found This It's Probably Too Late"	2007	124	—	—	—	—	—	—	—	—	—		"Brianstorm" single
"Temptation Greets You Like Your Naughty Friend"	2007	77	—	—	—	—	—	—	—	—	—		"Brianstorm" single
"What If You Were Right the First Time?"	2007	114	—	—	—	—	—	—	—	—	—		"Brianstorm" single
"D Is for Dangerous"	2007	116	—	—	—	—	—	—	—	—	—	BPI: Silver	Favourite Worst Nightmare
"Balaclava"	2007	104	—	—	—	—	—	—	—	—	—	BPI: Silver	Favourite Worst Nightmare
"Only Ones Who Know"	2007	130	—	—	—	—	—	—	—	—	—	BPI: Silver	Favourite Worst Nightmare
"Do Me a Favour"	2007	127	—	—	—	—	—	—	—	—	—	BPI: Gold	Favourite Worst Nightmare
"If You Were There, Beware"	2007	189	—	—	—	—	—	—	—	—	—		Favourite Worst Nightmare
"The Bad Thing"	2007	140	—	—	—	—	—	—	—	—	—		Favourite Worst Nightmare
"Old Yellow Bricks"	2007	122	—	—	—	—	—	—	—	—	—	BPI: Gold	Favourite Worst Nightmare
"505"	2007	73	—	19	55	— (Note: "505" did not enter the Netherlands' Single Top 100 but peaked on the Netherlands' Single Tip Chart at number 12.)	193	—	—	2	94	BPI: 4× Platinum; IFPI GR: 2× Platinum	Favourite Worst Nightmare
"The Bakery"	2007	161	—	—	—	—	—	—	—	—	—		"Fluorescent Adolescent" single
"Plastic Tramp"	2007	153	—	—	—	—	—	—	—	—	—		"Fluorescent Adolescent" single
"Too Much to Ask"	2007	178	—	—	—	—	—	—	—	—	—		"Fluorescent Adolescent" single
"Sketchead"	2009	80	—	—	—	—	—	—	—	—	—		"Cornerstone" single
"Piledriver Waltz"	2011	—	—	—	—	—	—	—	—	—	—	BPI: Silver	Suck It and See
"Evil Twin"	2011	114	—	—	—	—	—	—	—	—	—		"Suck It and See" single
"Electricity"	2012	128	—	—	—	—	—	—	—	—	—		"R U Mine?" single
"Come Together"	2012	21	—	—	62	—	—	—	—	—	—		Isles of Wonder
"Stop the World I Wanna Get Off with You"	2013	74	—	—	—	—	—	—	—	—	—	BPI: Silver; RIAA: Gold	"Why'd You Only Call Me When You're High?" single
"I Want It All"	2013	— (Note: "I Want It All" did not enter the UK Official Singles Chart Top 100 but peaked on the Official UK Streaming Chart at number 27.)	—	—	—	—	—	—	—	—	—	BPI: Silver	AM
"No. 1 Party Anthem"	2013	— (Note: "No. 1 Party Anthem" did not enter the UK Official Singles Chart Top 100 but peaked on the Official UK Streaming Chart at number 29.)	—	—	—	—	—	—	—	25	177	BPI: Platinum; RIAA: Platinum	AM
"Fireside"	2013	— (Note: "Fireside" did not enter the UK Official Singles Chart Top 100 but peaked on the Official UK Streaming Chart at number 38.)	—	—	—	—	—	—	—	—	—	BPI: Silver; RIAA: Gold	AM
"Knee Socks"	2013	— (Note: "Knee Socks" did not enter the UK Official Singles Chart Top 100 but peaked on the Official UK Streaming Chart at number 36.)	—	—	—	—	—	—	—	—	—	BPI: Platinum; RIAA: Platinum	AM
"Mad Sounds"	2013	— (Note: "Mad Sounds" did not enter the UK Official Singles Chart Top 100 but peaked on the Official UK Streaming Chart at number 37.)	—	—	—	—	—	—	—	—	—	BPI: Silver; MC: Gold	AM
"I Wanna Be Yours"	2013	99	39	6	78	99	26	66	93	—	55	BPI: 3× Platinum; RIAA: 6× Platinum; AFP: 5× Platinum; IFPI GR: 3× Platinum; MC: 7× Platinum	AM
"You're So Dark"	2013	135	—	—	—	—	—	—	—	—	—		"One for the Road" single
"Star Treatment"	2018	23	—	—	33	—	14	—	—	—	—	BPI: Silver	Tranquility Base Hotel & Casino
"One Point Perspective"	2018	26	—	—	48	—	20	—	—	—	—		Tranquility Base Hotel & Casino
"American Sports"	2018	— (Note: "American Sports" did not enter the UK Official Singles Chart Top 100 but peaked on the Official UK Streaming Chart at number 49.)	—	—	56	—	28	—	—	—	—		Tranquility Base Hotel & Casino
"Golden Trunks"	2018	— (Note: "Golden Trunks" did not enter the UK Official Singles Chart Top 100 but peaked on the Official UK Streaming Chart at number 58.)	—	—	62	—	39	—	—	—	—		Tranquility Base Hotel & Casino
"The World's First Ever Monster Truck Front Flip"	2018	— (Note: "The World's First Ever Monster Truck Front Flip" did not enter the UK Official Singles Chart Top 100 but peaked on the Official UK Streaming Chart at number 64.)	—	—	65	—	45	—	—	—	—		Tranquility Base Hotel & Casino
"Science Fiction"	2018	— (Note: "Science Fiction" did not enter the UK Official Singles Chart Top 100 but peaked on the Official UK Streaming Chart at number 78.)	—	—	82	—	51	—	—	—	—		Tranquility Base Hotel & Casino
"She Looks Like Fun"	2018	— (Note: "She Looks Like Fun" did not enter the UK Official Singles Chart Top 100 but peaked on the Official UK Streaming Chart at number 79.)	—	—	83	—	52	—	—	—	—		Tranquility Base Hotel & Casino
"Batphone"	2018	— (Note: "TITLE" did not enter the UK Official Singles Chart Top 100 but peaked on the Official UK Streaming Chart at number 64.)	—	—	—	91	—	55	—	—	—		Tranquility Base Hotel & Casino
"The Ultracheese"	2018	— (Note: "The Ultracheese" did not enter the UK Official Singles Chart Top 100 but peaked on the Official UK Streaming Chart at number 88.)	—	—	87	—	56	—	—	—	—		Tranquility Base Hotel & Casino
"Sculptures of Anything Goes"	2022	— (Note: "Sculptures of Anything Goes" did not enter the UK Official Singles Chart Top 100 but peaked on the Official UK Streaming Chart at number 60.)	—	75	32	—	—	—	—	—	—		The Car
"Jet Skis on the Moat"	2022	— (Note: "Jet Skis on the Moat" did not enter the UK Official Singles Chart Top 100 but peaked on the Official UK Streaming Chart at number 87.)	—	—	—	—	—	—	—	—	—		The Car
"The Car"	2022	— (Note: "The Car" did not enter the UK Official Singles Chart Top 100 but peaked on the Official UK Streaming Chart at number 96.)	—	—	—	—	92	—	—	—	—		The Car
"—" denotes a release that did not chart.

== Music videos ==
List of music videos, showing year released and directors
Title	Year	Director(s)
"Fake Tales of San Francisco"	2005	Chris Commons and Mark Bull
"I Bet You Look Good on the Dancefloor"	2005	Huse Monfaradi
"When the Sun Goes Down"	2006	Paul Fraser
"The View from the Afternoon"	2006	W.I.Z.
"Leave Before the Lights Come On"	2006	John Hardwick
"Brianstorm"	2007	Huse Monfaradi
"Fluorescent Adolescent"	2007	Richard Ayoade
"Teddy Picker"	2007	Roman Coppola
"Crying Lightning"	2009	Richard Ayoade
"Cornerstone"	2009	Richard Ayoade
"My Propeller"	2010	Will Lovelace and Dylan Southern
"Brick by Brick"	2011	Aaron Brown and Ben Chappell (Focus Creeps)
"Don't Sit Down 'Cause I've Moved Your Chair"	2011	Aaron Brown and Ben Chappell (Focus Creeps)
"The Hellcat Spangled Shalalala"	2011	Aaron Brown and Ben Chappell (Focus Creeps)
"Suck It and See"	2011	Aaron Brown and Ben Chappell (Focus Creeps)
"Evil Twin"	2011	Aaron Brown and Ben Chappell (Focus Creeps)
"Black Treacle"	2012	Aaron Brown and Ben Chappell (Focus Creeps)
"You and I"	2012	Aaron Brown and Ben Chappell (Focus Creeps)
"R U Mine?"	2012	Aaron Brown and Ben Chappell (Focus Creeps)
"Do I Wanna Know?"	2013	David Wilson
"Why'd You Only Call Me When You're High?"	2013	Nabil Elderkin
"One for the Road"	2013	Aaron Brown and Ben Chappell (Focus Creeps)
"Arabella"	2014	Jake Nava
"Snap Out of It"	2014	Aaron Brown and Ben Chappell (Focus Creeps)
"Four Out of Five"	2018	Aaron Brown and Ben Chappell (Focus Creeps)
"Tranquility Base Hotel & Casino"	2018	Aaron Brown and Ben Chappell (Focus Creeps)
"Arabella (Live At The Royal Albert Hall)"	2020	Ben Chappell
"There'd Better Be a Mirrorball"	2022	Alex Turner
"Body Paint"	2022	Brook Linder and Ben Chappell
"I Ain't Quite Where I Think I Am"	2022	Zachary Michael and Ben Chappell
"Sculptures Of Anything Goes"	2023	Ben Chappell

== Other appearances ==
Song	Year	Album	Notes
"Love Machine"	2006	Radio 1's Live Lounge	Live cover, originally by Girls Aloud.
"You Know I'm No Good"	2007	Radio 1's Live Lounge – Volume 2	Live cover, originally by Amy Winehouse.
"Diamonds Are Forever"	2008	All the Rage	Cover of a 1971 Shirley Bassey song.
"I Bet You Look Good on the Dancefloor"	2012	Isles of Wonder	Songs recorded during the rehearsal at the 2012 Summer Olympics opening ceremony stadium on 23 July.
"Come Together"	2012	Isles of Wonder	Songs recorded during the rehearsal at the 2012 Summer Olympics opening ceremony stadium on 23 July.
"On a Mission"	2012	BBC Radio 1's Live Lounge 2012	Live cover, originally by Katy B.
"Hold On, We're Going Home"	2013	BBC Radio 1's Live Lounge 2013	Live cover, originally by Drake.
