= Beneath the Boardwalk =

Demo album by Arctic Monkeys
- Released: 2004
- Recorded: 2004; Sheffield, England; 2 Fly Studios
- Genre: Indie rock; garage rock; post-punk revival
- Length: 52:14

Arctic Monkeys chronology
Beneath the Boardwalk (2004)	Five Minutes with Arctic Monkeys (2005)

Beneath the Boardwalk refers to a collection of 18 demo recordings by Sheffield band Arctic Monkeys which were burned onto CDs to give away at the band's gigs for free, and which emerged on the Internet in 2004, promptly file-shared amongst fans.

== Background ==
The name Beneath the Boardwalk originated when the first batch of demos were sent around on the Internet. The first sender, wanting to classify the demos, named them after the club where he received them, the Boardwalk in Sheffield — a since defunct venue where the Arctic Monkeys used to play gigs. Alex Turner and Andy Nicholson used to work at the Boardwalk. Slowly, as more demos were spread online, they were all classified under this name. This has led to many people falsely believing that Beneath the Boardwalk was an early album, or that the early demos were all released under this heading.

In a 2005 interview with Prefix Magazine, Arctic Monkeys drummer Matt Helders said:

"We used to record demos and then just burn them onto CDs and give them away at gigs. Obviously there weren't many demos available, so people used to share them on the Internet, which was a good way for everyone to hear it. So we used to share — not us personally, we don't even know how to do it — but fans did. There's a guy who has come along to film us — two guys, actually; one of them is the main guy who put the songs on the Internet. So the fans just used to send them to each other, which didn't bother us because we never made those demos to make money or anything. We were giving them away free anyway — that was a better way for people to hear them. And it made the gigs better, because people knew the words and came and sang along. We can't complain about it."

== Legacy ==
Many of the songs featured in the collection (tracks 1, 5, 6, 8, 10, 11, 12 and 14) went on to appear later — albeit re-recorded — on Arctic Monkeys' debut album, Whatever People Say I Am, That's What I'm Not. The track "Cigarette Smoke" was later reworked into "Cigarette Smoker Fiona" for the Who the Fuck Are Arctic Monkeys? EP. "Scummy" was also re-recorded and re-titled as "When The Sun Goes Down". "Bigger Boys and Stolen Sweethearts" was released as a B-side of the "I Bet You Look Good on the Dancefloor" single, and "Stickin' to the Floor" became a B-side on the "When the Sun Goes Down" single. The remaining tracks have not been commercially released.

== Track listing ==
The track list itself is a source of ambiguity as there is no official version of the collection. The collection was added to as more demos emerged from CDs given out for free by the band after gigs. Some variations of the collection included rare live performances.

No.	Title	Length
1.	"A Certain Romance"	5:24
2.	"Bigger Boys and Stolen Sweethearts"	2:52
3.	"Choo Choo"	3:08
4.	"Cigarette Smoke"	2:56
5.	"Dancing Shoes"	2:25
6.	"Fake Tales of San Francisco"	3:04
7.	"Knock a Door Run"	4:27
8.	"Mardy Bum"	2:53
9.	"On the Run From the MI5"	1:43
10.	"Riot Van"	2:15
11.	"Scummy"	3:22
12.	"Still Take You Home"	3:09
13.	"Wavin' Bye to the Train or the Bus"	3:03
14.	"Bet You Look Good on the Dancefloor"	2:52
15.	"Stickin' to the Floor"	2:00
16.	"Space Invaders"	2:42
17.	"Curtains Closed"	2:10
18.	"Ravey Ravey Ravey Club (live)"	2:04

== Personnel ==
Arctic Monkeys

- Alex Turner – lyrics, lead vocals, lead and rhythm guitar
- Jamie Cook – rhythm and lead guitar
- Andy Nicholson – bass guitar, backing vocals
- Matt Helders – drums, percussion, backing vocals
