= The View from the Afternoon =

Promotional single by Arctic Monkeys

from the album Whatever People Say I Am, That's What I'm Not
- Released: 23 January 2006
- Recorded: September 2005
- Studio: The Chapel (Lincolnshire)
- Genre: Post-punk revival, garage rock
- Length: 3:38
- Label: Domino
- Songwriter: Alex Turner
- Producer: Jim Abbiss

Arctic Monkeys singles chronology
"When the Sun Goes Down" (2006)	"The View from the Afternoon" (2006)	"Fake Tales of San Francisco" (2006)

Music video
- "The View from the Afternoon" on YouTube

"The View from the Afternoon" is a song by Arctic Monkeys originally released as the opening track on the band's first album Whatever People Say I Am, That's What I'm Not in January 2006. It was also the lead track on the Who the Fuck Are Arctic Monkeys? EP. This release had an accompanying video. Although never released as a single, the song was a staple of live concerts by the band on their early tours.

== Release ==
"The View from the Afternoon" was expected to have been the band's third single, following UK number ones "I Bet You Look Good on the Dancefloor" and "When the Sun Goes Down", but the band announced in March 2006 that its next record would be a five-track EP, which thereby disqualified it from being listed in the UK Singles Chart and UK Albums Chart because it was too long to be a single and too cheap to be an album.

== Composition ==
Alex Turner said "This is one of the last songs written for the album. There's nothing clever, it's just about anticipating the evening, finding comfort in familiarity and the fact that you know you're bound to send a daft message or something before the sun comes up. I think I've stopped doing that now."

== Music video ==
The video revolves around a young man in a parka jacket playing the drum part of the song in the middle of a courtyard between blocks of high rise flats. A sequence of surreal elements is interspersed throughout: a schoolgirl walks past wearing plastic devil horns; a running fox; three men trying to attract the attention of the drummer who ignores them; the drummer is fed milk by the schoolgirl and then a brief shot in colour of the man floating on his back in shallow water. The music stops, and it is revealed that his drumming has caused his hands to bleed. Next, there is a shot of a man in the dark wielding a baseball bat, then a brief shot of the moon which appears to explode and then the man in the dark struggling to lift his bat. Finally, the man with the bat comes near to the drummer and is about to strike him, but the audio stops and we see a last shot of the male being showered in what could be rain or the fragments of the moon.

The events in the video are loosely based on the story of the Buddha, who was said to have meditated under a tree for days. While he meditated, devils came to seduce and sabotage him, but he resisted. Seeing the Buddha starve himself in order to attain nirvana, a woman gave him milk to quench his thirst.

The video is shot in black and white and was filmed near Park Hill flats in the Arctic Monkeys' native city of Sheffield, directed by W.I.Z. for Factory Films. It was also partially filmed later in the courtyard of Bromyard House, Ledbury Estate in Peckham, South East London. A tattoo of the three intersecting circles sigil adopted by John Bonham, the drummer of Led Zeppelin, can be seen on the man's right wrist.

== Personnel ==
Credits adapted from Whatever People Say I Am, That's What I'm Not liner notes.

Arctic Monkeys

- Alex Turner
- Jamie Cook
- Andy Nicholson
- Matt Helders

Technical

- Jim Abbiss – production, recording
- Ewan Davies – recording
- Simon 'Barny' Barnicott – mixing
- Owen Skinner – mixing assistance
- George Marino – mastering

== Certifications ==
Region	Certification	Certified units/sales
United Kingdom (BPI)	Gold	400,000^{‡}
^{‡} Sales+streaming figures based on certification alone.
