= A Certain Romance =

Song by Arctic Monkeys

from the album Whatever People Say I Am, That's What I'm Not
- Released: January 23, 2006
- Genre: Indie rock; alternative rock; post-Britpop
- Length: 5:31
- Label: Domino
- Songwriter: Alex Turner
- Producer: Jim Abbiss

"A Certain Romance" is a song by English rock band Arctic Monkeys written by frontman Alex Turner. It is a re-recorded version of a 2004 demo, and serves as the closing track of their 2006 debut studio album Whatever People Say I Am, That's What I'm Not. The song was conceived by Turner in his teens, and follows his observation of the activities and romance—and lack thereof—among youth.

"A Certain Romance" was deemed a highlight of the album and praised by critics for its composition and lyrics, though it was not released as a single.

== Recording ==
Arctic Monkeys was formed in 2002, and began recording music in 2003. A series of eighteen demos collectively known as Beneath the Boardwalk were burned onto CDs and given out by the band in 2004, later earning traction through the Internet. Among these tracks is the earliest recorded version of "A Certain Romance". Frontman and lead singer Alex Turner believed the song, compared to Arctic Monkeys' previous recordings, was "contentious" and greater than the band itself. It was later re-recorded for their debut album Whatever People Say I Am, That's What I'm Not at The Chapel in South Thoresby in 2005. The song was a staple of their live repertoire in their early years.

== Composition ==
"A Certain Romance" is an alternative rock song and the longest track on Whatever People Say I Am, That's What I'm Not. Written by Turner in his teens, it follows his observation of the activities of youth, and the romance and lack of it among them. At first he is scornful, though he eventually feels sympathy and sorrow for them, and accepts that "there isn't no romance around there." It was composed by the members of the band, including bassist Andy Nicholson, who left after the album was released. It features a wordless two-minute guitar solo intended to express emotions through the instruments themselves, a sound the band would replicate in their 2022 album The Car.

== Reception ==
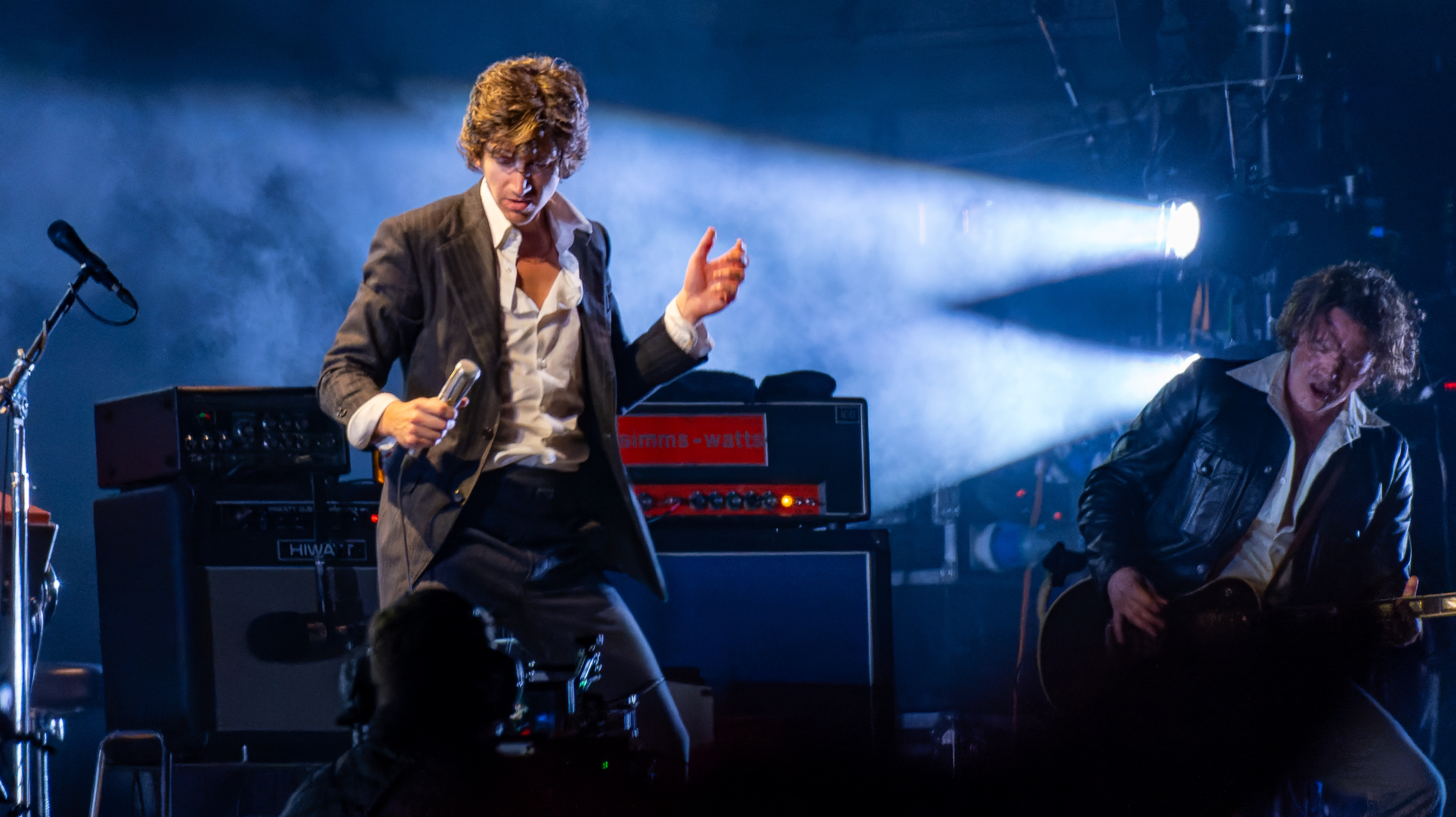
Arctic Monkeys performing at Glastonbury Festival in 2023

"A Certain Romance" received positive reviews from critics, and similarities between the 2004 demo and the studio version were noted. Alexis Petridis of The Guardian called it an "insightful, oddly moving dissection of the chav phenomenon." NME described it as "a strangely even-handed song which starts out scorning local townies then appears to absolve them at the end of the song." Writing for Rolling Stone magazine, Barry Walters praised the "hyper-realistic observations" Turner made and believed the track "sums up" the album. Later, Rolling Stone wrote that "What starts as a critique of people who are ostensibly less sophisticated, stylish, or romantic, soon becomes an astute deconstruction of the snark, cynicism, and us-vs-them posturing endemic to youth. It's a rather tender, empathetic note to land on, and Arctic Monkeys emphasize it not with words, but two dueling livewire guitars twisting around each other in a perfect tangle of uncertainty and exultation."

Paste magazine's Matt Mitchell said "No choruses can be found here, only a climax of a towering, skyrocketing, shape-shifting guitar solo that lends a hand to the gods—the only spirit that could possibly be higher than what Turner and the band take to the bank". Mitchell also believed it featured "some of Turner's best wordplay and language-crafting". Scott Plagenhoef of Pitchfork described it as "a neat summation of both the band’s M.O. and a teenage life characterized by existential drift and geographic claustrophobia" and suggested the band release the track as a single. Online music magazine MusicOMH said that it is "a wonderfully articulate dissection of youth culture that belies Turner's tender years". Radio X called it a "fine end to a fine debut album".

Select rankings for "A Certain Romance"
Publication/critic	Accolade	Rank	Ref.
NME	Every Arctic Monkeys songs ranked in order of greatness	1	
NME	100 Tracks of the Decade	10	
NME	150 Best Tracks of the Past 15 Years (2011)	140	
Paste	The 40 Greatest Arctic Monkeys Songs	2	
Pitchfork	Top 100 Tracks of 2006	90	
Rolling Stone	The Best 30 Arctic Monkeys Songs	3	

== Personnel ==
Credits taken from Whatever People Say I Am, That's What I'm Not liner notes.

Arctic Monkeys

- Alex Turner
- Jamie Cook
- Andy Nicholson
- Matt Helders

Technical

- Jim Abbiss – production, recording
- Ewan Davies – recording
- Simon 'Barny' Barnicott – mixing
- Owen Skinner – mixing assistance
- George Marino – mastering

== Certifications ==
Certifications for "A Certain Romance"
Region	Certification	Certified units/sales
United Kingdom (BPI)	Platinum	600,000^{‡}
^{‡} Sales+streaming figures based on certification alone.
