= Leave Before the Lights Come On =

2006 single by Arctic Monkeys

Single by Arctic Monkeys
- B-side: "Put Your Dukes Up John"; "Baby I'm Yours"
- Released: 14 August 2006
- Recorded: Mayfair, London
- Length: 3:52
- Label: Domino
- Songwriters: Arctic Monkeys (Jamie Cook, Matt Helders, Andy Nicholson, Alex Turner)
- Producer: Jim Abbiss

Arctic Monkeys singles chronology
"Fake Tales of San Francisco" (2006)	"Leave Before the Lights Come On" (2006)	"Brianstorm" (2007)

Music video
- "Leave Before the Lights Come On" on YouTube

"Leave Before the Lights Come On" is a song by English indie rock band Arctic Monkeys. The song was released on 14 August 2006 as the band's third single in the United Kingdom. The song was not included on the band's debut album Whatever People Say I Am, That's What I'm Not, though Alex Turner has stated that it could have been on the album as it follows a similar theme to many of the album tracks. It was the band's final release before promotion began for their second album Favourite Worst Nightmare in spring 2007.

"Leave Before the Lights Come On" entered the UK Singles Chart at number four on 20 August 2006, becoming their first single not to top the chart. It did, however, reach number one on the Scottish Singles Chart, becoming their third consecutive number-one in that region. The single was the Arctic Monkeys' first single to enter the Canadian Singles Chart, debuting at number two, behind Eva Avila's "Meant to Fly", by only 15 copies. It descended to number three in its second week and remained on the chart for seven weeks. The song also reached the top 20 in Denmark and Ireland.

== Background ==
The single's release was confirmed on the band's website on 6 July 2006 and that the track would be released on 14 August as a three-track CD and a two-track 7-inch vinyl. The website did not offer any further information, but NME's website announced that the two B-side tracks for the single will be covers, "one of which will be their version of an old song and the other a cover of a track by one of their favourite groups." In July 2006, it was confirmed on Gonzo that "Put Your Dukes Up, John" by The Little Flames would be one of the cover versions. On 17 July, it emerged on an Arctic Monkeys fan site that the other cover version would be "Baby, I'm Yours" originally recorded by Barbara Lewis. The official website soon confirmed this and added that the track would be a collaboration with the 747s.

Alex Turner confirmed the release of the single in an interview with NME: "'Leave Before the Lights Come On' feels very much like it could be on the album. So we're going to put that out as a single. I remember it's the last song that I wrote about that sort of time, going out and that. My life's not really like that any more."

This is the first single to feature Nick O'Malley on bass following the departure of Andy Nicholson, which was announced on 20 June 2006.

== Music video ==
The video was released on the band's website on 3 August 2006. It was directed by John Hardwick, who was also at the helm for the video for "M.O.R." for the band Blur. The video was filmed in Sheffield in the Cultural Industries Quarter in July 2006 and features actors Kate Ashfield and Paddy Considine. The video starts off with Ashfield on the top of a building (the Showroom Cinema) about to jump off. She drops her shoe as Considine is walking in the street below. He sees Ashfield and immediately runs to the top of the building. He puts out his hand then he and Ashfield hug. The two walk to nearby cafe and sit down to have coffee. Ashfield makes an attempt to kiss Considine. He stops her, showing his wedding ring, then walks out of the cafe but she makes an attempt to follow him. He gets her up against a fence and threatens her before walking off. Ashfield then runs back up to the top of the building where she purposely drops her shoe in front of an unsuspecting Matt Helders, strolling along in a T-shirt with the words 'Bang, Bang' on it, a recording company for the Arctic Monkeys, implying the events to be repeated cyclically.

=== Credits ===
- Kate Ashfield
- Paddy Considine
- Matt Helders
- Alex Turner
- Directed by: John Hardwick
- Directed of Photography: Danny Cohen
- Writers: John Hardwick & Paddy Considine
- Editor: Owen Oppenheimer
- Production Company: Warp x Films

== Track listings ==
CD single
No.	Title	Length
1.	"Leave Before the Lights Come On" (Arctic Monkeys)	3:51
2.	"Put Your Dukes Up John" (The Little Flames cover)	3:02
3.	"Baby I'm Yours" (Barbara Lewis cover)	2:41

7-inch single
No.	Title	Length
1.	"Leave Before the Lights Come On"
2.	"Baby I'm Yours" (Barbara Lewis cover by the Newell Octet)

== Personnel ==
Arctic Monkeys

- Alex Turner
- Jamie Cook
- Nick O'Malley
- Matt Helders

Additional musicians on "Baby I'm Yours"

- Oisin Leech – backing and co-lead vocals, Spanish guitar
- The 747s – backing band
- Ned Crowther – backing vocals
- The Heritage Orchestra – strings
- Massimo Signorelli – percussion, finger snaps, hand claps, tammorra

== Charts ==
=== Weekly charts ===
Chart (2006)	Peak position
Australia (ARIA)	81
Canada (Nielsen SoundScan)	2
Denmark (Tracklisten)	11
Ireland (IRMA)	16
Italy (FIMI)	40
Scotland Singles (OCC)	1
UK Singles (OCC)	4
UK Indie (OCC)	1

=== Year-end charts ===
Chart (2006)	Position
UK Singles (OCC)	114

== Certifications ==
Region	Certification	Certified units/sales
United Kingdom (BPI)	Silver	200,000^{‡}
^{‡} Sales+streaming figures based on certification alone.

== Release history ==
Region	Date	Format(s)	Label(s)	Ref.
United Kingdom	14 August 2006	CD	Domino	
Australia	23 October 2006	CD	Domino	
