= 747s (band) =

English indie band

The 747s were an indie band, from Liverpool, England. Their debut album Zampano was released in September 2006.

The band supported The Raconteurs on their first UK tour in 2006. Other bands they supported in 2006 include The Strokes and The Thrills

Singer Oisin Leech appears on Arctic Monkeys' cover of Barbara Lewis' "Baby I'm Yours", sharing lead vocals with Arctic Monkeys' Alex Turner. The song was released as a b-side on Arctic Monkeys' 2006 single "Leave Before the Lights Come On".

The band split and the lead singer, Oisin Leech, is part of duo The Lost Brothers with former guitarist of The Basement, Mark McCausland.

The bassist Ned Crowther started a band "Smokey Angle Shades" with lead guitarist Fred Stitz who later joined the UK based Indie band Razorlight on bass

== Members ==
- Oisin Leech - Lead vocals, Rhythm guitar
- Ned Crowther – Bass guitar
- Massimo Signorelli – Drums
- Freddie Stitz – Lead guitar

== Discography ==
=== Singles ===
- "Night & Day" (5 June 2006) UK #143
- "Death of a Star" (18 September 2006) UK #159

=== Albums ===
- Zampano (25 September 2006)
