= The Violet May =

UK musical group

The Violet May are an English 6-piece rock act from Sheffield, England. Formed in early 2009, The Violet May quickly earned a reputation for their wild live shows and were named by Alan McGee in The Guardian as one of his "Top 15 Tips for 2010".

In 2010, The Violet May released their debut single "Bright Or Better" as a limited edition 7" vinyl single on Oh! Inverted World Records, along with an accompanying video shot by Douglas Hart of Jesus and Mary Chain in Peter Stringfellow's London nightclub.

Following the release of "Bright Or Better", the band appeared on Steve Lamacq's BBC 6Music show as his "New Favourite Band".

The Violet May also headlined London's Koko (venue) for Club NME, undertook a headline residency at Alan McGee's Death Disco clubnight in London, played at Leeds Festival and Secret Garden Party, and then headed to Italy for a sold-out tour through Rome, Venice and Florence.

In early 2011, The Violet May toured in Germany with The Chapman Family before releasing their debut EP entitled "TV", along with a single of the same name. The EP was recorded in Sheffield's 2Fly Studios with producer Alan Smyth, who had previously worked with other notable bands from the city including Pulp, Arctic Monkeys, Reverend & The Makers, Richard Hawley and The Long Blondes.

Later in the same year, The Violet May supported Death in Vegas and performed their second headline show at London's Koko venue before embarking on their own UK headline tour. The band also played two shows at Iceland Airwaves Festival in Reykjavik.

== History ==
The band's name was taken from an independent record store in Sheffield in the 1970s called Violet May. A book documenting the store called Shades of Violet has been written by John Firminger and Gus Chapman and features an introduction by Sheffield singer-songwriter Richard Hawley, formerly of Sheffield acts Longpigs and Pulp.

The Violet May's frontman and lead vocalist Chris McClure was the disheveled face on the front cover of the 2006 debut Arctic Monkeys album Whatever People Say I Am, That's What I'm Not, and is also the brother of Jon McClure, the lead singer and frontman of Sheffield act Reverend and The Makers. Chris McClure also appeared on the cover of Toddla T's 2009 album, Skanky Skanky.

John Kubicki, formerly of Sheffield act Barricades, is The Violet May's main songwriter as well as playing guitar, synth, and vocals on all the tracks. Jono How, formerly of another Sheffield act Black Light Theatre plays lead guitar, Dan Booth plays bass guitar and Al Whitaker is the band's drummer.
