= Five Minutes with Arctic Monkeys =

EP by Arctic Monkeys
- Released: 30 May 2005
- Studio: Motor Museum
- Genres: Indie rock; post-punk revival; garage rock
- Length: 6:11
- Label: Bang Bang Recordings Limited
- Producer: Mike Crossey

Arctic Monkeys chronology
Beneath the Boardwalk (2004)	Five Minutes with Arctic Monkeys (2005)	Whatever People Say I Am, That's What I'm Not (2006)

Five Minutes with Arctic Monkeys is the debut EP by English rock band Arctic Monkeys, released on 30 May 2005 by Bang Bang Recordings.

== Background ==
Released on 30 May 2005, it featured a re-recording of fan favourite "Fake Tales of San Francisco" and new song and B-side "From the Ritz to the Rubble". It was a limited release by Bang Bang Recordings – a label created by the band for the sole purpose of releasing the single. The name, Bang Bang, was mooted as a replacement band name, on the basis that the name Arctic Monkeys sounded "silly".

Only 1500 CDs and 1500 vinyl copies were made available, meaning the single is now rare and increasingly sought after by fans of the band. Both tracks were re-recorded and included on the band's debut album, Whatever People Say I Am, That's What I'm Not (2006).

== Track listing ==
All lyrics are written by Alex Turner; all music is composed by Arctic Monkeys.

No.	Title	Length
1.	"Fake Tales of San Francisco"	3:00
2.	"From the Ritz to the Rubble"	3:11

== Bang Bang Recordings Limited ==
The record label Bang Bang Recordings Limited was originally incorporated on 31 May 2005 with their registered office at 1 Conduit Street in London. The band utilised a dedicated startup firm to assist in the creation of the company. Arctic Monkeys signed a contract with the record label Domino Records later that month. The company remains owned by the members of Arctic Monkeys to this day, with manager Ian McAndrew as director. The current registered location of Bang Bang Recordings is 41 Great Portland Street in London.

== Personnel ==
Personnel taken from Fives Minutes with Arctic Monkeys liner notes.

Arctic Monkeys

- Alex Turner
- Jamie Cook
- Andy Nicholson
- Matt Helders

Additional personnel

- Mike Crossey – production, engineering, mixing
- Jamie Lewis – assistance
- John Davis – mastering
- Andy Brown – photograph
