= Fake Tales of San Francisco =

Promotional single by Arctic Monkeys

from the album Whatever People Say I Am, That's What I'm Not
- Released: 2005
- Length: 2:57
- Label: Domino
- Songwriter: Alex Turner
- Producer: Jim Abbiss

Arctic Monkeys singles chronology
"The View from the Afternoon" (2006)	"Fake Tales of San Francisco" (2005)	"Leave Before the Lights Come On" (2006)

Music video
- "Fake Tales of San Francisco" on YouTube

"Fake Tales of San Francisco" is a song by English indie rock band Arctic Monkeys originally released on the band's first EP, Five Minutes with Arctic Monkeys, in May 2005. After being featured on the band's debut album Whatever People Say I Am, That's What I'm Not, the song was released as a radio-only single in the United States instead of "Leave Before the Lights Come On", which was released there at the end of October.

== Background ==
The lyrical meaning of "Fake Tales of San Francisco" narrates the beginning of the band, their gigs in Sheffield local bars and their comparison to other bands. Alex Turner's lyrics express how bands tried to be like other bands, hence the lyric "get off the bandwagon". The lyrics express how bands portrayed this "fake" image of who they were and what they wanted their audience to perceive them as. Turner's lyrics sound older than an 18-year-old's, displaying a wiser and sadder tone. There is a dry sorrowful feel to the lyrics, especially when love is compared to being blind and deaf as well. Turner revamps a known phrase and gives it a new meaning. The lyrics also portray that a band should reconnect to its roots and should not create a fake idea of what the band is made to be.

== Music video ==
The music video for the song is the same as when it was previously released on Five Minutes with Arctic Monkeys. Directed by a friend of the band, Mark Bull, the video features a compilation of footage of some of the band's earliest performances at various gigs and was given airplay in the UK on MTV Two in 2005. Although he has now left the band, the video includes several shots of former bassist Andy Nicholson. The music video was directed and released by Domino Recording Co. In the video it demonstrates the Arctic Monkeys at the start of their career. The video displays some flashback to old gigs. It shows the band in local smaller bars corresponding to the lyrics of the song.

== Charts ==
Chart (2006)	Peak position
Canada Rock (Billboard)	43

== Certifications ==
Region	Certification	Certified units/sales
United Kingdom (BPI)	Platinum	600,000^{‡}
^{‡} Sales+streaming figures based on certification alone.
