= Boardwalk (nightclub) =

Former nightclub in Sheffield, England

Coordinates: 53°23′4.1″N 1°27′58.4″W

The Boardwalk was a bar/nightclub based on the corner of Snig Hill and Bank Street, Sheffield, South Yorkshire, England. The venue played host to many up-and-coming home-grown bands, as well as smaller touring bands and cover acts. In November 2010, the landlord of the venue voluntarily placed the owning company into administration and closed the site indefinitely. Despite an official statement in December of the same year claiming three potential parties to be interested in operating the venue, this did not materialise and the Boardwalk remained closed.

The Boardwalk originally opened as a jazz club in the 1930s. It had held an important place in Sheffield's music scene since the 1960s, when it was known as the Black Swan (and later by its local nickname, the Mucky Duck). It played host to a number of high-profile bands including AC/DC and Genesis, with the Clash playing their first gig at the venue on a bill that also included Sex Pistols and Buzzcocks.

In its later years, the music venue had helped facilitate the rise of local bands such as Arctic Monkeys, Tomato Plant, Jurys Out Bromheads Jacket, Milburn, Bring Me the Horizon, and Little Man Tate, with the former's first demo being dubbed Beneath the Boardwalk by those who shared it online.

After closure in November 2010, the Boardwalk has briefly reopened on several occasions under new ownership. The venue operated as the Fuel gay club, which relocated from the site later occupied by Code, between 2012 and 2015; and as the Bassbox drum and bass club until July 2019. Part of the former cellar was later in operation as the Meltdown esports bar, which closed in 2024.
