= Who the Fuck Are Arctic Monkeys? =

2006 EP by Arctic Monkeys

EP by Arctic Monkeys
- Released: 24 April 2006
- Studio: Chapel, Lincolnshire; Motor Museum, Liverpool; Konk, London
- Length: 18:51
- Label: Domino
- Producer: Jim Abbiss; Mike Crossey

Arctic Monkeys chronology
Whatever People Say I Am, That's What I'm Not (2006)	Who the Fuck Are Arctic Monkeys? (2006)	Favourite Worst Nightmare (2007)

Who the Fuck Are Arctic Monkeys? is the second EP by English rock band Arctic Monkeys, released on 24 April 2006 by Domino Recording Company. The extended play is the final record to feature Andy Nicholson on bass, as he was asked to leave (due to constant fatigue and not being able to keep up with the touring life) the band a month after the EP's release.

== Background ==
"The View from the Afternoon" was expected to have been the band's third single, following UK number ones "I Bet You Look Good on the Dancefloor" and "When the Sun Goes Down", but the band announced in March 2006 that its next record would be a five-track EP, which thereby disqualified it from being listed in the UK Singles Chart and UK Albums Chart.

"Despair in the Departure Lounge" was premiered at a gig in the Great American Music Hall in San Francisco, although it was played by Alex Turner alone due to Andy Nicholson blowing his bass amplifier. This would also be the only time the band played the song live.

Although the contentious language content of the EP resulted in less radio airplay than the band's earlier releases, the nature of their rise to fame and their lack of reliance on radio meant that this was not a concern for the band.

Professional ratings
Review scores
Source	Rating
AbsolutePunk	(77%)
AllMusic	3.5/5 stars
Drowned in Sound	4/10
MusicOMH	(positive)
NME	(unfavorable)
Pitchfork	5.9/10
Robert Christgau	(choice cut)

== Track listing ==
No.	Title	Length
1.	"The View from the Afternoon"	3:38
2.	"Cigarette Smoker Fiona"	2:56
3.	"Despair in the Departure Lounge"	3:22
4.	"No Buses"	3:17
5.	"Who the Fuck Are Arctic Monkeys?"	5:36

== Personnel ==
Personnel taken from Who the Fuck Are Arctic Monkeys? liner notes.

Arctic Monkeys

- Alex Turner
- Jamie Cook
- Andy Nicholson
- Matt Helders

Additional personnel

- Jim Abbiss – production, recording (track 1)
- Mike Crossey – production, engineering (tracks 2–5); mixing (tracks 2–4)
- Alan Moulder – mixing (track 5)
- Ewan Davies – recording (track 1)
- Simon 'Barny' Barnicott – mixing (track 1)
- Owen Skinner – mixing assistance (track 1)
- Andy Savours – mixing assistance (tracks 2 & 3)
- Ben Mason – mixing assistance (tracks 4 & 5)
- Juno Liverpool – design
- Jimm Cleasby – front photo

== Charts ==
Chart (2006)	Peak position
Australia (ARIA)	37
Denmark (Tracklisten)	2
France (SNEP)	52
Germany (GfK)	79
Ireland (IRMA)	5
Sweden (Sverigetopplistan)	58

== Release history ==
Region	Date	Format(s)	Label(s)	Ref.
United Kingdom	24 April 2006	10-inch vinyl; CD	Domino	
Australia	22 May 2006	CD	Domino	
