= Whatever People Say I Am, That's What I'm Not =

2006 studio album by Arctic Monkeys

Studio album by Arctic Monkeys
- Released: 23 January 2006
- Recorded: June–September 2005
- Studios: The Chapel (South Thoresby); 2 Fly (Sheffield); Telstar (Munich) (Note: "Mardy Bum")
- Genres: Indie rock; garage rock revival; post-punk revival; alternative rock; punk rock
- Length: 40:56
- Label: Domino
- Producers: Jim Abbiss; Alan Smyth

Arctic Monkeys chronology
Five Minutes with Arctic Monkeys (2005)	Whatever People Say I Am, That's What I'm Not (2006)	Who the Fuck Are Arctic Monkeys? (2006)

Singles from Whatever People Say I Am, That's What I'm Not
- 1. "I Bet You Look Good on the Dancefloor" Released: 17 October 2005; 2. "When the Sun Goes Down" Released: 16 January 2006

Whatever People Say I Am, That's What I'm Not is the debut studio album by the English rock band Arctic Monkeys, released on 23 January 2006 in the United Kingdom and on 21 February 2006 in the United States by Domino Recording Company. Preceded by the chart-topping singles "I Bet You Look Good on the Dancefloor" and "When the Sun Goes Down", the album also contains re-recorded versions of both tracks from the band's debut extended play (EP), Five Minutes with Arctic Monkeys (2005). It is the group's only album to feature bassist Andy Nicholson, as he left the band shortly after the album's release.

Forming in 2002, Arctic Monkeys frequently gave away free demo CDs to fans at gigs; this resulted in the fans uploading the band's music to social media sites. As attention towards them continued to grow, the band eventually garnered great demand from fans, the press and the music industry. Several of the album's tracks had been released for free via the Internet in late 2004, which consolidated on the unofficial Beneath the Boardwalk compilation. Musically, Whatever People Say I Am, That's What I'm Not is considered a melding of indie rock, garage rock, post-punk revival, punk rock, and alternative rock. Its thematic content has been likened to a concept, primarily concerning British nightlife, including lyricism surrounding clubbing and pub culture, and romance from the perspective of young Northerners.

Prior to the release of Whatever People Say I Am, That's What I'm Not, Arctic Monkeys achieved their first UK number-ones with album singles "I Bet You Look Good on the Dancefloor" and "When the Sun Goes Down". Upon release, it became the fastest-selling debut album in British music history, selling over 360,000 copies in its first week, and remains the fastest-selling debut album by a band in the country. It has since been certified 8× platinum in the UK by the British Phonographic Industry (BPI). In the US, it also became the second-fastest selling independent record label debut album in the country and was certified platinum by the Recording Industry Association of America (RIAA) for selling at least 1,000,000 copies there.

The album received widespread critical acclaim upon release for its vivid depiction of contemporary British youth culture and for resurging British indie music, which had waned after the 1990s. Among its accolades included being named the best album of 2006 by Time magazine, winning the Brit Award for Best British Album, winning the 2006 Mercury Prize, and receiving a Grammy Award nomination for Best Alternative Music Album at the 49th Grammy Awards. It has been ranked in several greatest albums lists, including number 371 in Rolling Stone's "The 500 Greatest Albums of All Time" in 2012, number 19 in NME's "The 500 Greatest Albums of All Time" in 2013, and number 97 in Rolling Stone's "The 100 Best Debut Albums of All Time" in 2022.

== Composition and content ==
Musically, Whatever People Say I Am, That's What I'm Not features indie rock, garage rock revival, post-punk revival, punk rock, alternative rock, and post-Britpop. The common thematic content of the album has led to it being considered by some a concept album concerning "the lives of young Northern England clubbers". All tracks record first-person narratives of observations made within this context. "I Bet You Look Good on the Dancefloor", "Still Take You Home", "You Probably Couldn't See for the Lights but You Were Staring Straight at Me" and "Dancing Shoes" all examine human behaviour in nightclubs. Frontman Alex Turner describes "Dancing Shoes" as being about "people always looking to pull when they go out however much they mask it."

Other songs examine other aspects of 2000s English nightlife from a 19 year-old Alex Turner's experience and perspective. "From the Ritz to the Rubble" is an account of nightclub bouncers, "Red Light Indicates Doors Are Secured" tells the typical experiences and troubles of getting a taxicab after a night out, and "When the Sun Goes Down" was inspired by prostitutes near the band's practice room in the Neepsend district of Sheffield. Other songs are themed on romantic relationships, such as "Mardy Bum", or youth subcultures, such as "Fake Tales of San Francisco" and "A Certain Romance". In NME's list of the top 100 tracks of the decade, "A Certain Romance" was described as "a strangely even-handed song which starts out scorning local townies then appears to absolve them at the end of the song."

== Title and artwork ==
The album's title was taken from a line in the novel Saturday Night and Sunday Morning, written by Alan Sillitoe. The name was chosen after Turner recognised similarities between the two works and the appropriateness of the title. He said that "it's good because the book is called Saturday Night and Sunday Morning and that's kind of what the album is, so there's a link there. And also, there's a lot of people saying a lot of things about us and you don't have control over it." He also said that "songs including 'The View from the Afternoon', 'Dancing Shoes', 'Still Take You Home' and 'From the Ritz to the Rubble' all cover that bit of the weekend and feature the same character."

The album's cover is a black-and-white photograph of Chris McClure – a close friend of the band who is the lead singer for The Violet May and the brother of Reverend and The Makers lead singer Jon McClure, which was taken in the early hours of the morning at the Korova bar in Liverpool. The band had given him, his cousin, and his best friend £70 to spend on a night out. The image caused some controversy when Laurence Gruer of NHS Scotland criticised the cover for "reinforcing the idea that smoking is okay". The band's product manager denied the accusation, and in fact suggested the opposite: "You can see from the image smoking is not doing him the world of good." Billboard advertisements for the album used a similar image to the cover picture, but without the cigarette. Digitally, the album cover is often modified away from black-and-white with a slightly blue-ish tint.

== Release and promotion ==
Forming in 2002, Arctic Monkeys frequently gave away free demo CDs to fans at gigs, which resulted in fans uploading the band's music to social media sites, and as their attention hugely grew, the band had garnered great demand from fans, the press and the music industry. Prior to the release of the album, the tracks "Mardy Bum", "I Bet You Look Good on the Dancefloor", "Fake Tales of San Francisco", "Dancing Shoes", "Still Take You Home", "Riot Van", "When the Sun Goes Down" (then known as "Scummy" or "Scummy Man") and "A Certain Romance" had been released for free via the internet in late 2004 and consolidated on the unofficial Beneath the Boardwalk compilation.

"I Bet You Look Good on the Dancefloor" was released as the first single from the album. The song debuted at number one on the UK Singles Chart in October 2005 for one week, knocking Sugababes' "Push the Button" off the top. "When the Sun Goes Down" was released as the second single from the album in January 2006, also debuting at number one on the UK Singles Chart.

The original release date was 30 January 2006, but was brought forward to 23 January 2006 due to "high demand". Although the same was done with Franz Ferdinand, it was speculated that the move was an attempt to counter the effects of the album's leak onto online file-sharing sites. The re-recorded album versions had been leaked onto the internet by December 2005.

On the first day of its release, the album became the fastest-selling debut album in British history, selling just under 120,000 copies. By the end of the week, the album had sold 363,735 copies—more than the rest of the top 20 combined and making it the overall fastest-selling debut album in British history. Its release in the United States on 21 February 2006 saw it become the second fastest-selling debut indie album in history, turning over around 34,000 copies in its first week and achieving number 24 in the album charts and was certified Gold by RIAA for indicating sales of 500,000 copies in August 2017. The album also went to number one in Australia and Ireland. UK sales as of September 2013 stood at 1,475,982 copies. In February 2014, the album was certified 5× Platinum, and 7× Platinum by April 2022 for indicating sales of 2,100,000 copies.

"The View from the Afternoon" was expected to have been the band's third single, following UK number ones "I Bet You Look Good on the Dancefloor" and "When the Sun Goes Down", but the band announced in March 2006 that its next record would be a five-track EP, which thereby disqualified it from being listed in the UK Singles Chart and UK Albums Chart.

The track "Mardy Bum", while not released as a single, appeared on radio playlists throughout the UK in mid-2006, and is still played infrequently on BBC Radio 1 and some alternative rock stations such as SiriusXM's Sirius XMU. The track "A Certain Romance" was ranked number 90 in Pitchfork Media's Top 100 Tracks of 2006 and cited as the standout track. NME also placed "A Certain Romance" at 10 in their list of 100 Tracks of the Decade. In October 2011, NME placed it at number 140 on its list "150 Best Tracks of the Past 15 Years".

In the US, "Fake Tales of San Francisco" was released as the album's third single and peaked at number 30 on the Billboard charts.

== Critical reception ==
Professional ratings
Aggregate scores
Source	Rating
Metacritic	82/100
Review scores
Source	Rating
AllMusic	5/5 stars
Entertainment Weekly	A−
The Guardian	5/5 stars
Los Angeles Times	4/4 stars
NME	10/10
Pitchfork	7.4/10
Q	4/5 stars
Rolling Stone	4/5 stars
Spin	B+
The Village Voice	A−

Whatever People Say I Am, That's What I'm Not received widespread acclaim from critics upon release. On Metacritic, it has a weighted average rating of 82 out of 100 based on 33 reviews, indicating "universal acclaim". It featured highly in many year-end lists and has been hailed as a modern classic. Many critics and figures in the British media hyped the Arctic Monkeys and their rapid rise to acclaim through unconventional means and some even cited the Arctic Monkeys as revolutionising the way people find music as they built a fanbase on the basis of a few demos shared by fans through the internet. Critics hugely praised the album for its depiction of British youth culture and for resurging British indie music, which had waned after the 1990s.

NME declared the Arctic Monkeys "Our Generation's Most Important Band", and Alex Turner's lyrics and depiction of Sheffield, and the night lives of teenagers in particular, were praised, with him being labelled as a "master of observation" and USA Today writing "you probably won't hear a better CD all year long", calling it "utterly infectious". In a five star review for Blender, Simon Reynolds, highlighted the band's instrumental inventiveness, and Turner's voice and lyrics, saying of the latter that they "couple the invincible confidence of youth with the pathos of someone older, wiser and sadder", adding, "This delicate poise of intimacy and distance permeates the album, making these vignettes of teenage wildlife resonate far beyond the local world they vividly and vigorously document." MusicOMH wrote that it was the sort of guitar rock that "makes you fall in love with music all over again" and along with many other critics cited "A Certain Romance" as the standout track and as being "a wonderfully articulate dissection of youth culture that belies Turner's tender years". It was, however, noted that some of the tracks which had previously been released on the internet as demos had lost some of their quality and "don't sound as good".

In 2013, seven years after its release, Rolling Stone wrote, "It turned out that all the Monkeys needed to conquer the world was scrappy, lager-fueled tunes about being young and bored in a bleak steel town [...] Thanks to Turner's big bag of creaky melodies and the band's snaggletoothed guitar attack, even America couldn't resist pub-punk gems like the raging, sexy "I Bet You Look Good on the Dance Floor [sic]."

=== Accolades ===
Publication	Accolade	Rank	Ref.
Pitchfork	The 200 Best Albums of the Last 25 Years (Readers' List)	79	
Rolling Stone	Rolling Stone's 100 Best Albums of 2000s	41	
Rolling Stone	Rolling Stone's 500 Greatest Albums of All Time (2012)	371	
Rolling Stone	Rolling Stone's 100 Best Debut Albums of All Time (2022)	97	
NME	100 Greatest British Albums Ever	5	
NME	NME's 500 Greatest Albums of All Time	19	

==== Awards and nominations ====
- Winner of the Barclaycard Mercury Prize
- Best Album – Q Awards
- Album of the Year – NME
- Album of the Year – Crossbeat magazine (Japan)
- Album of the Year – Time
- Album of the Year – Hot Press (Ireland)
- Best International Album – Meteor Music Awards (Ireland)
- Best British Album – 2007 Brit Awards
- Best British Group – 2007 Brit Awards
- Best Alternative Music Album – 2007 Grammy Awards

In 2009 the album placed at number 9 in MTV's "Greatest Album Ever" online poll. The album was also included in the book 1001 Albums You Must Hear Before You Die. It was ranked 97 in Rolling Stone's 2022 edition of its "100 Best Debut Albums of All Time" list. As of May 2021, the album has remained on the UK Indie Chart for 706 weeks.

== Track listing ==
All tracks are written by Alex Turner, except where noted.

No.	Title	Writer(s)	Length
1.	"The View from the Afternoon"		3:38
2.	"I Bet You Look Good on the Dancefloor"	Arctic Monkeys	2:53
3.	"Fake Tales of San Francisco"		2:57
4.	"Dancing Shoes"		2:21
5.	"You Probably Couldn't See for the Lights but You Were Staring Straight at Me"		2:10
6.	"Still Take You Home"	Jamie Cook; Turner	2:53
7.	"Riot Van"		2:14
8.	"Red Light Indicates Doors Are Secured"		2:23
9.	"Mardy Bum"		2:55
10.	"Perhaps Vampires Is a Bit Strong But..."		4:28
11.	"When the Sun Goes Down"		3:20
12.	"From the Ritz to the Rubble"		3:13
13.	"A Certain Romance"		5:31
Total length:			40:56

== Personnel ==
Credits taken from liner notes, except where noted.

Arctic Monkeys

- Alex Turner
- Jamie Cook
- Andy Nicholson
- Matt Helders

Additional musician

- James Ford – electric piano and organ on "Riot Van"

Technical

- Jim Abbiss – production, recording (all except "Mardy Bum"); mixing on "Mardy Bum"
- Alan Smyth – production on "Mardy Bum", additional recording on "When the Sun Goes Down"
- Ewan Davies – recording (all except "Mardy Bum")
- Henry – recording assistance (all except "Mardy Bum")
- Andreas Bayr – recording on "Mardy Bum"
- Simon 'Barny' Barnicott – mixing
- Owen Skinner – mixing assistance
- George Marino – mastering

Design

- Juno Liverpool – design
- Alexandra Wolkowicz – front & back cover photography, booklet pictures (pages 2, 3, 5, 6, 8-10 & centre photo)
- Andy Brown – booklet pictures photography (pages 1, 4, 7, 11, 12)

== Charts ==
=== Weekly charts ===
Chart (2006–2023)	Peak position
Australian Albums (ARIA)	1
Austrian Albums (Ö3 Austria)	23
Belgian Albums (Ultratop Flanders)	9
Belgian Albums (Ultratop Wallonia)	22
Canadian Albums (Billboard)	16
Croatian International Albums (HDU)	1
Danish Albums (Hitlisten)	6
Dutch Albums (Album Top 100)	8
Finnish Albums (Suomen virallinen lista)	8
French Albums (SNEP)	17
German Albums (Offizielle Top 100)	20
Irish Albums (IRMA)	1
Italian Albums (FIMI)	40
Japanese Albums (Oricon)	9
New Zealand Albums (RMNZ)	5
Norwegian Albums (VG-lista)	12
Polish Albums (ZPAV)	39
Portuguese Albums (AFP)	29
Scottish Albums (Official Charts)	1
Spanish Albums (Promusicae)	38
Swiss Albums (Schweizer Hitparade)	16
Swedish Albums (Sverigetopplistan)	26
UK Albums (Official Charts)	1
UK Independent Albums (Official Charts)	1
US Billboard 200	24
US Independent Albums (Billboard)	1

=== Year-end charts ===
Chart (2006)	Position
Australian Albums (ARIA)	53
Belgian Albums (Ultratop Flanders)	50
Danish Albums (Hitlisten)	56
Dutch Albums (Album Top 100)	56
European Hot 100 Albums (Billboard)	33
French Albums (SNEP)	131
Irish Albums (IRMA)	9
UK Albums (OCC)	4
Worldwide Albums (IFPI)	36

Chart (2007)	Position
UK Albums (OCC)	135

Chart (2013)	Position
UK Albums (OCC)	155

Chart (2018)	Position
UK Albums (OCC)	65

Chart (2019)	Position
UK Albums (OCC)	74

Chart (2020)	Position
UK Albums (OCC)	51

Chart (2021)	Position
Belgian Albums (Ultratop Flanders)	178
UK Albums (OCC)	51

Chart (2022)	Position
Belgian Albums (Ultratop Flanders)	155
UK Albums (OCC)	37

Chart (2023)	Position
Belgian Albums (Ultratop Flanders)	180
UK Albums (OCC)	43

Chart (2024)	Position
UK Albums (OCC)	69

Chart (2025)	Position
UK Albums (OCC)	70

=== Decade-end charts ===
Chart (2000–09)	Position
UK Albums (OCC)	84

Chart (2010–19)	Position
UK Vinyl Albums (OCC)	18

== Certifications and sales ==
Region	Certification	Certified units/sales
Australia (ARIA)	Platinum	70,000^{^}
Canada (Music Canada)	Platinum	100,000^{‡}
Denmark (IFPI Danmark)	2× Platinum	40,000^{‡}
Italy (FIMI) sales since 2009	Gold	25,000^{‡}
Japan (RIAJ)	Gold	100,000^{^}
New Zealand (RMNZ)	2× Platinum	30,000^{‡}
United Kingdom (BPI)	8× Platinum	2,500,000
United States (RIAA)	Platinum	1,000,000^{‡}
Summaries
Europe (IFPI)	Platinum	1,000,000^{*}
^{*} Sales figures based on certification alone.^{^} Shipments figures based on certification alone.^{‡} Sales+streaming figures based on certification alone.
