= Alex Turner =

British indie rock musician (born 1986)

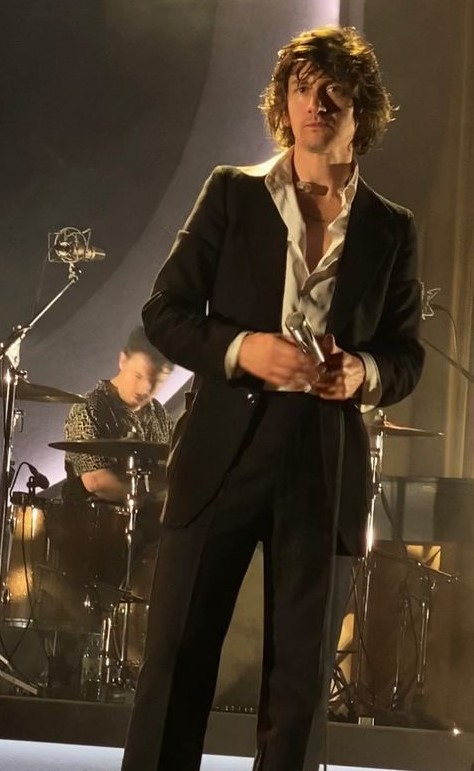
- Turner performing with Arctic Monkeys in 2023

Background information
- Born: Alexander David Turner; 6 January 1986 (age 40); Sheffield, England
- Genres: Indie rock; garage rock; post-punk revival; psychedelic rock; alternative rock; lounge pop; baroque pop; art rock
- Occupations: Singer; musician; songwriter
- Instruments: Vocals; guitar; keyboards
- Years active: 2002–present
- Member of: Arctic Monkeys; The Last Shadow Puppets

Alexander David Turner (born 6 January 1986) is an English singer, songwriter and guitarist, and the frontman of the rock band Arctic Monkeys. He is known for his lyricism ranging from kitchen sink realism to surrealist wordplay, which has been praised by music critics. All but one of Turner's studio albums have topped the UK Albums Chart. He has won seven Brit Awards, an Ivor Novello Award, and a Mercury Prize among other accolades.

When Turner was 16, he and three friends formed Arctic Monkeys. Their debut album, Whatever People Say I Am, That's What I'm Not (2006), became the fastest-selling debut album in British history and, along with the band's fifth studio album AM (2013), appeared on Rolling Stone's 500 Greatest Albums of All Time and other lists. The band has experimented with desert rock, indie pop, R&B, and lounge music. He also co-founded The Last Shadow Puppets with Miles Kane in 2007, who have released two orchestral pop albums: The Age of the Understatement (2008) and Everything You've Come to Expect (2016).

Turner provided an acoustic soundtrack for the feature film Submarine (2010), which additionally served as his solo debut extended play (EP). He co-wrote and co-produced Alexandra Savior's debut album Belladonna of Sadness (2017).

== Early life ==
Alexander David Turner was born in Sheffield on 6 January 1986, the only child of secondary school teachers Penny (née Druce) and David Turner. He was raised in Sheffield's High Green suburb. He has said that his parents came from "very different backgrounds"; his mother, from Amersham, Buckinghamshire, taught German and was "fascinated by language". His father, a Sheffield native, taught music and physics. Turner's parents were both music fans and his earliest musical memories involve the Beatles and the Beach Boys. During car journeys, his mother played music by Led Zeppelin, David Bowie, and the Eagles. His father was a fan of jazz and swing music, particularly Frank Sinatra, and had played the saxophone, trumpet, and piano in big bands. Turner himself was taught some scales on the family keyboard by his father and took professional piano lessons until he was eight years old.

From the age of five, Turner grew up alongside neighbour Matt Helders; they attended primary school, secondary school, and college together. At their primary school graduation ceremony, Turner and Helders joined some other friends in a mimed performance of Oasis' "Morning Glory"—Helders played the role of Liam Gallagher while Turner pretended to play the bass guitar, using a tennis racket as his instrument. The two met Andy Nicholson in secondary school, and the three friends bonded over their shared enjoyment of hip-hop artists such as Dr. Dre, the Wu-Tang Clan, Outkast, and Roots Manuva. They spent their time playing basketball, skateboarding, riding BMXs, and "making crap hip-hop" beats using Turner's father's Cubase system. Turner and his friends became interested in rock music following the breakthrough of the Strokes in 2001. His father let him borrow a school guitar to learn a "couple of chords" when Turner was 15 and, for Christmas that year, his parents bought him an electric guitar.

Turner was educated at Stocksbridge High School from 1997 to 2002. His former teacher, Mark Coleman, characterised him as a "bright" and "popular" student who excelled at sports rather than music. His English and drama teacher, Steve Baker, remembered him as a clever pupil who was "quite reserved" and "a little bit different". He noted that Turner had an "incredibly laid-back" approach to his studies, which worried his mother and led to criticism from other teachers. While there were books at home, Turner did not read regularly and was too self-conscious to share his writing with others. Nonetheless, he enjoyed English lessons. Turner then attended Barnsley College from 2002 to 2004. Given the opportunity to "get away without doing maths", he largely opted out of the "substantial" subjects required for university entry. He studied for A-levels in music technology and media studies, as well as AS-levels in English, photography, and psychology.

== Career ==
=== Arctic Monkeys ===
==== Early years and foundation ====
At the age of 15, Turner's weekends revolved around girls and drinking cider with his friends. Joe Carnall, a schoolfriend, has said Turner was "always the quiet one" in their social circle. After friends began forming bands and playing live, Turner, Helders, and Nicholson decided to start Arctic Monkeys in mid-2002. According to Nicholson, Turner already had "instruments about the house" and was conversant in the basics of musicianship because of his father's job as a music teacher. Helders bought a drum kit, while Turner suggested that Nicholson learn bass guitar, and invited Jamie Cook, a neighbour who attended a different school, to play guitar. Initially, Turner played guitar in the instrumental band; he became the frontman when two other school friends declined to sing. Helders considered Turner the obvious candidate for lyricist – "I knew he had a thing for words" – and he gradually began to share songs with his bandmates. Before playing a live show, the band rehearsed for a year in Turner's garage and, later, at an unused warehouse in Wath. According to Helders' mother, who drove the teenagers to and from their rehearsal space three times a week: "If they knew you were there, they would just stop so we had to sneak in." Their first gig was on Friday, 13 June 2003, supporting The Sound at a local pub called The Grapes. The set, which was partly recorded, comprised four original songs and four cover versions of songs by the Beatles, the White Stripes, the Undertones, and the Datsuns.

In the summer of 2003, Turner played seven gigs in York and Liverpool as a rhythm guitarist for the funk band Judan Suki, after meeting the lead singer Jon McClure on a bus. That August, while recording a demo with Judan Suki at Sheffield's 2fly Studios, Turner asked Alan Smyth if he would produce an Arctic Monkeys demo. Smyth obliged and "thought they definitely had something special going on. I told Alex off for singing in an American voice at that first session." An introduction by Smyth led to the band acquiring a management team, Geoff Barradale and Ian McAndrew. They paid for Smyth and Arctic Monkeys to record numerous three-song demos in 2003 and 2004. Turner was quiet and observant during studio sessions, remembered Smyth: "Whenever anyone popped in the studio, he would sit and listen to them before he would say anything." At their rehearsal room in Yellow Arch Studios, Arctic Monkeys developed a reputation as particularly hard workers; the owner lent the band touring equipment while the owner's wife helped Turner with his singing. Barradale drove the band around venues in Scotland, the Midlands, and the north of England to establish their reputation as a live band. The band handed out free copies of the demo CDs after each show and fans began sharing the unofficial Beneath the Boardwalk demo compilation online.

After finishing college in mid-2004, Turner took a year out to focus on the band and deferred vague plans to attend university in Manchester. He began working part-time as a bartender at the Sheffield music venue The Boardwalk. There, he met well-known figures including musician Richard Hawley and poet John Cooper Clarke. By the end of 2004, Arctic Monkeys' audiences were beginning to sing along with their songs and the demo of "I Bet You Look Good on The Dancefloor" (then called Bet You Look Good on The Dancefloor, as it was then the Beneath the Boardwalk version) was played on BBC Radio 1 by Zane Lowe.

==== National rise to prominence ====
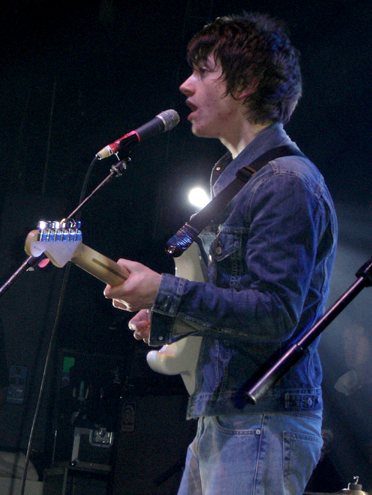
Turner performing in Newcastle Academy, 2006

Arctic Monkeys came to national attention in early 2005. They received their first mention in a national newspaper in April, with a Daily Star reporter describing them as "the most exciting band to emerge this year". They self-released an EP, featuring the single "Fake Tales of San Francisco", in May and commenced their first nationwide tour soon afterwards. In June, in the midst of a bidding war, Arctic Monkeys signed to the independent label Domino Recording Company. After initial sessions with James Ford and Mike Crossey, they recorded an album in rural Lincolnshire with producer Jim Abbiss. In October, the single "I Bet You Look Good on the Dancefloor" debuted at number one on the UK Singles Chart. Whatever People Say I Am, That's What I'm Not, Arctic Monkeys' debut album, was released in January 2006, and debuted at number one on the UK Albums Chart. Turner's lyrics, chronicling teenage nightlife in Sheffield, were widely praised. Kelefa Sanneh of The New York Times remarked: "Mr. Turner's lyrics are worth waiting for and often worth memorizing, too ... He has an uncanny way of evoking Northern English youth culture while neither romanticizing it nor sneering at it." Musically, Alexis Petridis of The Guardian noted that the album was influenced by guitar bands "from the past five years ... Thrillingly, their music doesn't sound apologetic for not knowing the intricacies of rock history."

It was the fastest-selling debut album in British music history and quickly became a cultural phenomenon. Turner was hailed by British press outlets as "the voice of a generation". In interview profiles, however, he was described as quiet and uncomfortable with attention. The band dismissed the hype, with Cook saying their goal was "to be able to grow like The Clash. When they started, it was a very basic, punky record. Then they started to take off and move in lots of directions. That's what we want." Less than two months after the album's release, Turner declared that Sheffield-inspired songwriting was "a closed book": "We're moving on and thinking about different things." Years later, Turner said that the attention during this period made him "a bit frightened or nervous": "We shut a lot of people out, just to try to keep some sort of control." The band turned down many promotional opportunities and quickly released new material – a five-track EP Who the Fuck Are Arctic Monkeys? in April, and a stand-alone single, "Leave Before the Lights Come On", in August. That summer, the band made the decision to permanently replace Nicholson, who had taken a touring break due to "fatigue", with Nick O'Malley, another childhood friend. Nicholson was informed at a band meeting, during which "Al did the speaking." Turner and Nicholson stopped speaking for two years but later repaired their friendship.

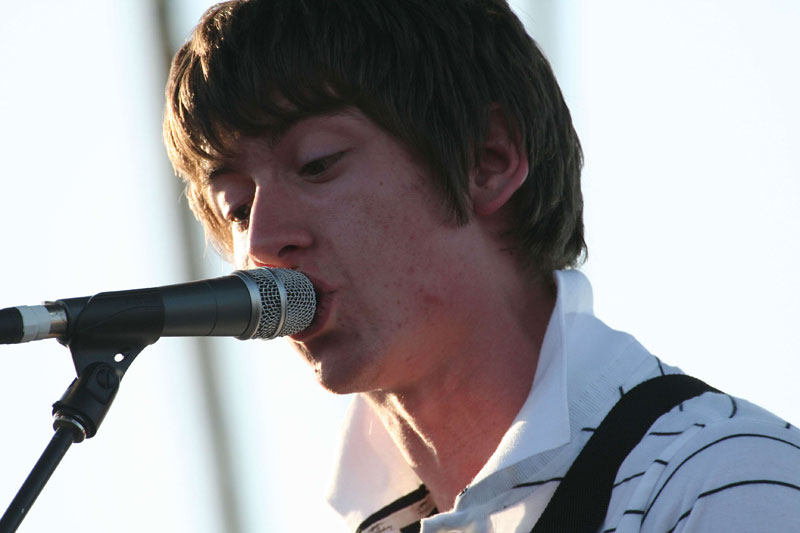
Turner performing at Coachella in May 2007

Arctic Monkeys' second album, Favourite Worst Nightmare, was released in April 2007, just over a year after their debut. It was produced in London by Mike Crossey and James Ford. As of 2020, Ford has produced every subsequent Turner project. Lyrically, the album touches on fame, love, and heartache. Johanna Bennett, Turner's then girlfriend, was credited as a co-writer on "Fluorescent Adolescent". While uninterested in the songs concerning fame, Marc Hogan of Pitchfork said the album displayed Turner's "usual gift for vivid imagery" and explored "new emotional depth". Petridis of The Guardian noted that the band were "pushing gently but confidently at the boundaries of their sound", with hints of "woozy psychedelia" and "piledriving metal". The album was a commercial success, debuting at number one in the UK, while Arctic Monkeys headlined Glastonbury Festival in the summer of 2007. Also that year, Turner began to collaborate with other artists. He worked with rapper Dizzee Rascal on the Arctic Monkeys B-side "Temptation", a version of which also featured on Rascal's album Maths and English. He co-wrote three songs on Reverend and The Makers' debut album The State Of Things, after briefly sharing a Sheffield flat with the frontman Jon McClure. Another Sheffield singer, Richard Hawley, featured on the Arctic Monkeys' B-side "Bad Woman" and performed with the band at the Manchester Apollo, as part of a concert film directed by Richard Ayoade.

Turner has described Arctic Monkeys' third album, Humbug, released in August 2009, as "a massive turning point" in the band's career. They travelled to Joshua Tree, California to work with producer Josh Homme of Queens of the Stone Age; it was the band's first experience of working in a studio for an extended period of time. Homme has said the album's heavier sound was initiated by the band themselves, while he encouraged Turner to embrace longer guitar solos and to develop his newfound "crooning" style of singing. While Petridis of The Guardian found some lyrics "too oblique to connect", he was impressed by the band's "desire to progress". He described "Cornerstone" as a "dazzling display of what Turner can do: a fabulously witty, poignant evocation of lost love." Joe Tangari of Pitchfork felt the album was a "legitimate expansion of the band's songwriting arsenal" and described "Cornerstone" as the highlight. During a break in the UK Humbug tour, Turner joined Richard Hawley on stage at a London charity concert, and played a seven-song acoustic set. Homme joined Arctic Monkeys for a live performance in Pioneertown, California.

Turner wrote Arctic Monkeys' fourth album, Suck It and See, in New York and met up with his bandmates and James Ford for recording sessions in Los Angeles. Marc Hogan of Pitchfork enjoyed the album's "chiming indie pop balladry" and "muscular glam-rock". Petridis of The Guardian remarked that Turner's new lyrical style of "dense, Dylanesque wordplay is tough to get right. More often than not, he pulls it off. There are beautifully turned phrases and piercing observation." Richard Hawley co-wrote and provided vocals for the B-side, "You and I", and performed the song with the band at the Olympia in Paris. Turner joined Elvis Costello on stage in New York to sing "Lipstick Vogue".

==== International breakthrough ====
By 2012, Arctic Monkeys were based in Los Angeles, with Turner and Helders sharing a house. Arctic Monkeys toured the US as the support act for the Black Keys in early 2012. While they had previously opened for Oasis and Queens of the Stone Age at one-off shows, it was the band's first time to tour as a supporting act. They released "R U Mine?" as a standalone single in preparation for the tour. Later that year, Arctic Monkeys performed "I Bet You Look Good on the Dancefloor" and a cover of "Come Together" by the Beatles at the 2012 London Summer Olympics opening ceremony. In early 2013, Turner provided backing vocals for the Queens of the Stone Age song "If I Had a Tail" and played bass guitar on "Get Right", a Miles Kane B-side. Arctic Monkeys headlined Glastonbury Festival for a second time in June.

AM was released in September 2013. Ryan Dombal of Pitchfork said that the album, dealing with "desperate 3 a.m. thoughts", managed to modernise "T. Rex bop, Bee Gees backup vocals, Rolling Stones R&B, and Black Sabbath monster riffage". Phil Mongredien of The Guardian described it as "their most coherent, most satisfying album since their debut": "Turner proves he has not lost his knack for an insightful lyric." Arctic Monkeys promoted the album heavily in the US, in contrast to previous album campaigns where, according to Helders, they had refused to do radio promotion: "We couldn't even have told you why at the time. Just stubborn teenage thinking." Arctic Monkeys spent 18 months touring AM; they were joined onstage by Josh Homme in both Los Angeles and Austin.

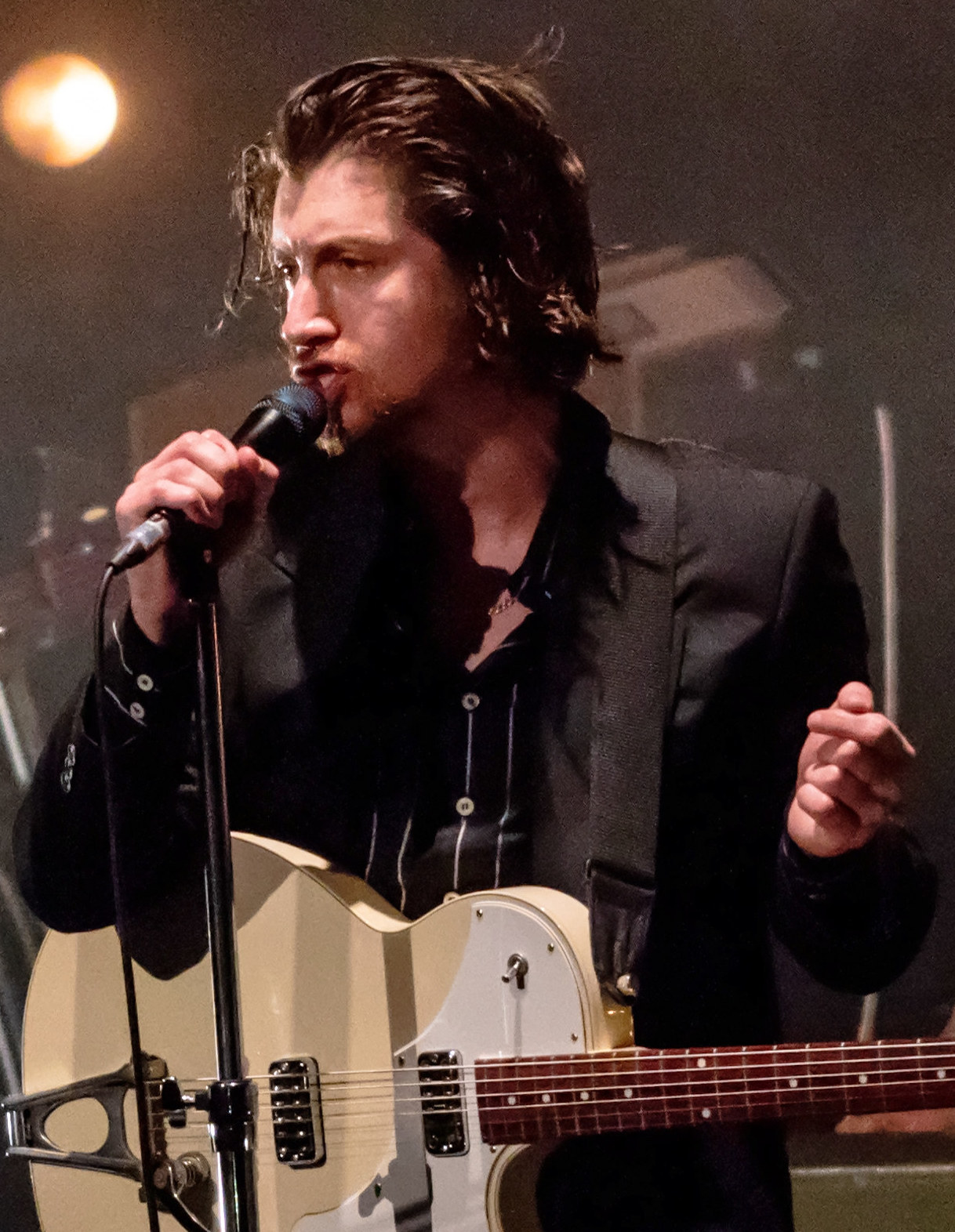
Turner performing at the Royal Albert Hall in 2018

Tranquility Base Hotel & Casino, Arctic Monkeys' sixth album, was released in May 2018. After receiving a Steinway Vertegrand piano as a 30th birthday present from his manager, Turner wrote the space-themed album from the perspective of "a lounge-y character". He recorded demos at home, alone and later with Helders, and shared them with Cook in early 2017. Cook was initially taken-aback by the change in direction but was "very, very excited by what he'd come up with." By mid–2017, the whole band was recording the project, produced by Turner and James Ford, in both Los Angeles and France. They were joined by musicians from the bands Tame Impala, Klaxons, and Mini Mansions.

Upon release, Jonah Weiner of Rolling Stone characterised Tranquility Base as "a captivatingly bizarre album about the role of entertainment – the desire to escape into it, and the desire to create it – during periods of societal upheaval and crisis." Alexis Petridis of The Guardian found it "quietly impressive" that the band chose to release the "thrilling, smug, clever and oddly cold album" rather than more crowd-pleasing fare. Jazz Monroe of Pitchfork declared it "a delirious and artful satire directed at the foundations of modern society." The album became the eighth number one album of Turner's career in the UK. The band toured the album from May 2018 to April 2019.

After unsuccessfully attempting to write heavier guitar riffs for the next album, Turner's songwriting took a similar subdued tone on Arctic Monkeys' seventh studio album, The Car, which was released in October 2022. The album heavily featured a string section co-arranged by Turner and its lead single, "There'd Better Be a Mirrorball", was accompanied by a video co-directed by Turner. In 2023, the band headlined Glastonbury Festival for the third time, despite Turner having been diagnosed with acute laryngitis days before.

=== The Last Shadow Puppets ===
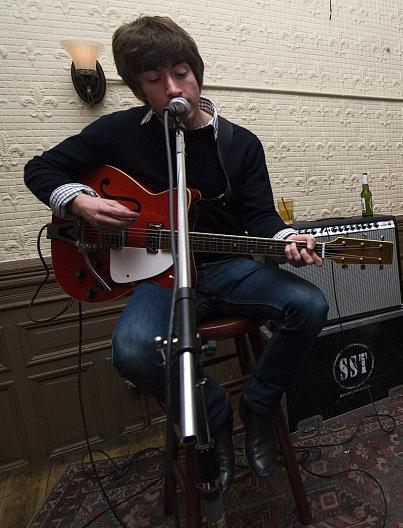
Turner performing with the Last Shadow Puppets in 2008

Turner announced plans in 2007 to form a side-project band, the Last Shadow Puppets, with Ford and Miles Kane, whom he had befriended during a tour in mid-2005. The Last Shadow Puppets' debut album, The Age of the Understatement, was released in April 2008, shortly after Turner had moved from Sheffield to east London. Co-written by Turner and Kane, the album was recorded in the Loire Valley, France and featured string arrangements by Owen Pallett. Hogan of Pitchfork noted that, lyrically, Turner was "moving from his anthropologically detailed Arctics brushstrokes to bold, cinematic gestures." Petridis of The Guardian detected "the audible enthusiasm of an artist broadening his scope" and praised "a certain fearlessness on display". During a tour with the London Philharmonic Orchestra, Turner said Kane's presence gave him "somewhere to hide" on stage. The Last Shadow Puppets gave a surprise performance at Glastonbury Festival, with both Matt Helders and Jack White making guest appearances. Alison Mosshart performed with the band at the Olympia in Paris, and provided vocals for a B-side. Also in 2008, Turner formed a covers band with Dev Hynes for a one-off show in London and recorded a spoken word track "A Choice of Three" for Helders' compilation album Late Night Tales.

The Last Shadow Puppets released their second album, Everything You've Come to Expect, in April 2016. Turner, Kane and Ford were joined by Zach Dawes of Mini Mansions, with whom Turner had collaborated on the songs "Vertigo" and "I Love You All The Time" in 2015. Owen Pallett again composed the string arrangements, this time working in the studio with the band rather than remotely. According to Turner, the album featured "the most straight-up love letters" of his career, written for American model Taylor Bagley whom he dated from 2015 to 2018. Laura Snapes of Pitchfork detected an air of "misanthropy" in the album. However, she acknowledged that Turner was "no less a gifted lyricist than ever" and described some songs as "totally gorgeous ... the structures fluid and surprising". Alexis Petridis of The Guardian enjoyed Turner's "characteristically sparkling use of language" and "melodic skill". However, he felt the pair's "in-joking" during interviews and Kane's "leery" encounter with a female Spin journalist sullied the album. From March until August 2016, they toured in Europe and North America. Turner's father David played saxophone at a Berlin show.

=== Solo work and collaborations ===
While living in Brooklyn, New York, where he had moved in the spring of 2009, Turner wrote an acoustic soundtrack for the coming-of-age feature film Submarine (2010); it was released as an EP in March 2011. Director Richard Ayoade initially approached Turner to sing cover versions but, instead, he recorded six original songs in London, accompanied by James Ford and Bill Ryder-Jones. Two of the songs had already been written; Turner wrote the rest after watching dailies from the film set. The songs existed within the world of the film as a mixtape made by the main character's father. Paul Thompson of Pitchfork felt "Turner's keen wit and eye for detail" had created a "tender portrayal" of adolescent uncertainty. Ben Walsh of The Independent said the "exquisite" soundtrack was "reminiscent" of Cat Stevens's work on Harold and Maude. In 2014, the Submarine soundtrack appeared on The Times's list of 100 Soundtracks to Love. Turner also co-wrote six songs for Miles Kane's debut solo album Colour of the Trap (2011) and co-wrote Kane's standalone single "First of My Kind" (2012).

Columbia Records approached Turner about working with Alexandra Savior in 2014, and he co-wrote her debut album, Belladonna of Sadness, in between Arctic Monkeys' touring commitments. Turner and James Ford co-produced the album in 2015, with Turner also playing bass, guitars, keyboards, and synthesisers. An additional song "Risk" was recorded with T Bone Burnett for an episode of the crime drama True Detective. While Turner and Savior performed together in Los Angeles in 2016, the album was not released until April 2017. In reviewing it, Hilary Hughes of Pitchfork remarked: "Turner's musical ticks are so distinct that they're instantly recognizable when someone else tries to dress them up as their own." Savior later said the press attention surrounding Turner's involvement was overwhelming: "I'm so grateful for him, but I'm also like, 'Alright, alright!'"

In 2022, Turner composed the music for the audiobook version of Richard Ayoade's The Book That No One Wanted to Read with the instrumental interludes being performed himself and James Ford. He also composed the music for the audiobook version of Ayoade's subsequent book, The Unfinished Harauld Hughes, released in 2024.

== Artistry ==
=== Influences ===
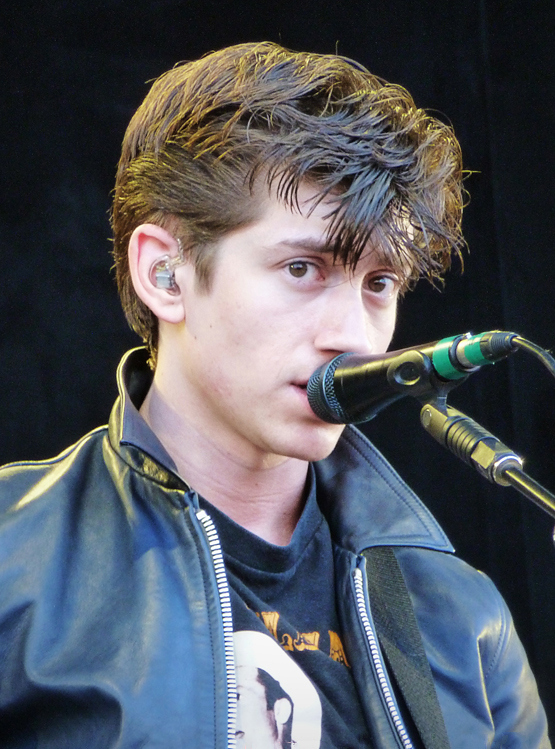
Turner performing in 2011

Turner was "into hip-hop in a big way" as a teenager. When he first started writing lyrics, Roots Manuva's Run Come Save Me was his main influence. He also listened to Rawkus Records and Lyricist Lounge compilations, and artists such as Dr. Dre, Snoop Dogg, Outkast, Eminem and the Streets. He has repeatedly cited Method Man as one of his favourite lyricists, and has referenced the Wu-Tang Clan in his own lyrics.

For Turner, the Strokes were "that one band that comes along when you are 14 or 15 years old that manages to hit you in just the right way and changes your whole perception of things." He changed his style of dress and began to take an interest in guitar music. He has since referenced the band in his lyrics. The Vines were the first band Turner ever saw live and Craig Nicholls provided inspiration for his early stage persona. Other early guitar influences included the Libertines, the Coral, The Hives and The White Stripes. In his late teens, Turner began "delving" into older music and discovered lyricists including Elvis Costello, Ray Davies of The Kinks, Jarvis Cocker of Pulp, Paul Weller of The Jam, and Morrissey of The Smiths. Turner has since performed with Jack White of The White Stripes, Costello and Johnny Marr of The Smiths.

John Cooper Clarke, whose poetry Turner first encountered at school, was a "massive" source of early inspiration. Turner was working as a barman at The Boardwalk in Sheffield in late 2004 when Clarke appeared on stage as the opening act for the Fall. The performance made a big impression on the eighteen-year-old: "He's talking 100 miles an hour, and he's really funny ... It just blew my mind." He was inspired by Clarke's use of a regional accent and the early Arctic Monkeys song "From the Ritz to the Rubble" was his homage to Clarke's style ("my best shot at it, at least"). Later in his career, Turner requested to interview Clarke for Mojo Magazine, published two Clarke poems as part of a single's artwork and used another ("I Wanna Be Yours") as the lyrical basis for a song. In 2018, Arctic Monkeys invited Clarke to perform his reading of "I Wanna Be Yours" at one of their Sheffield arena shows.

Nick Lowe, Jake Thackray, Nick Cave, John Cale, Leonard Cohen and Bob Dylan are among the lyricists Turner admires. He has spoken of his respect for country music songwriters like Roger Miller, Willie Nelson, Townes Van Zandt, and Hank Williams. He has been drawn to artists who reinvented themselves throughout their careers: "The Beatles, David Bowie… the big ones." When forming The Last Shadow Puppets in 2007, Turner was inspired by the music of Bowie, Scott Walker, Serge Gainsbourg, David Axelrod and Ennio Morricone. Songs that Turner has discussed repeatedly in interviews are Michael Chapman's "You Say", Leon Russell's "A Song for You" and Dion's "Only You Know", describing the latter as "one of my favourite tunes of all time". He has described himself as a Beyoncé fan.

Turner's work is also influenced by movies. Tranquility Base Hotel and Casino was inspired by films such as 2001: A Space Odyssey (1968), World on a Wire (1973), Le Cercle Rouge (1970), Spirits of the Dead (1968), Inherent Vice (2014) and The Last Waltz (1978). In the song "Hello You", there are references to post-war British movie Tread Softly Stranger (1958) and Stanley Kubrick's unmade script for Napoleon. He has also said he's interested in film production and editing and has read about those topics, citing In the Blink of an Eye (2005) by Walter Murch as a book "that feels connected to the process and also the feel or lyrics on [The Car]." Turner has also cited Raymond Chandler's Philip Marlowe series and works by authors David Foster Wallace and George Saunders as inspirations for The Car.

=== Songwriting ===
Kate Mossman of the New Statesman described Turner as "one of the great lyricists of the 21st century", writing that his songs are "full of lovingly extended metaphors" and "mordant Morrissey-style observations". Mike Laws of the Village Voice characterised him as "a writer without peer in virtually all of rock" and identified "rapid-fire prosody and facility with internal rhyme" as Turner's trademarks. Simon Armitage, writing in The Guardian, said: "Of all those writing lyrics today, Turner is among the most poetic. His use of internal rhyme exists to be admired and envied ... Turner is a storyteller and scene-setter." "Like all the estimable British lyricists, be it Noël Coward or Morrissey, Turner has always been willing to risk a delicious irony or witty turn of phrase, even in a sad song." Kitty Empire of The Observer considers him "probably the finest lyricist of his generation." Turner's frequent collaborator Owen Pallett said of him: "There are many contemporary rock songwriters who I admire, but none more than Alex, [...] there seems to be no limit to his lyrical inventiveness… It would be impossible to overpraise him."

Turner's early songs chronicled teenage nightlife in England, and, according to Armitage, were "of the kitchen-sink, social-realism variety." Sasha Frere-Jones of the New Yorker described him as "a prodigy at both character sketches and song form." Turner drew comparisons to Alan Bennett and Victoria Wood. As Turner has aged, Laws of the Village Voice noted: "His lyrics have shied away from making themselves amenable to easy reading. [They have become] more oblique and abstruse — more apt, too, to adopt the perspective of somebody else entirely, and so more editorially unreliable." Turner himself acknowledges that, after writing "so directly" on his early songs, he went through a period of "wanting to reject that and, you know… just be the walrus for a bit." He first "attempted to write lyrics that weren't so observational" with his side-project The Last Shadow Puppets, later remarking that he had sometimes veered too far "into abstraction", but that approach "definitely affected everything I wrote since". He considers the lyrics on 2018's Tranquility Base Hotel and Casino to be the most direct since his earliest songs: "I think that was something I was trying to get away from, and perhaps I've returned to it now."

Turner has said his songs are preoccupied with romance, loneliness, and longing. Jazz Monroe of Drowned in Sound remarked: "Turner seems part of an elite club of songwriters whose best love songs are the requited ones." Similarly, in reviewing 2013's AM, Mossman found the depiction of romantic partners "two-dimensional. In "Fluorescent Adolescent", or the memorably titled "Mardy Bum", he somehow managed to tell a girl's side of the story even in the act of mocking her." Neil McCormick of The Telegraph noted "a particularly North of England, working-class quality of sarcastic misanthropy" in Turner's lyrics while Frere-Jones of the New Yorker said Turner "manages to summon the intractable bleakness of someone three times his age". Later songs have alluded to "questions of consumerism, hyper-reality, [and] accelerating technology". Monroe of The Independent highlights "anti-industry sloganeering", "lyrical abstraction", "postmodern scepticism", and a "rejection of the entire rock construct" as the "through-line in Turner's work".

Turner himself says that his songwriting is "absolutely not" poetry: "Poetry and the written word are harder, you've no melodies to hide behind." After initial reluctance, he began publishing his lyrics with Arctic Monkeys' fourth album. In an in-depth conversation about songcraft with New York's Lane Brown, he said: "I don't really get the 'I wrote the whole song on the back of a cigarette packet in 20 minutes' sort of thing ... I would keep adding or changing words forever if somebody didn't stop me." Turner has said writing melodies is the more difficult part of the songwriting process for him. Alexis Petridis of The Guardian believes "Turner's melodic skill sometimes gets overlooked" because he "arrived in the public consciousness words-first."

He has also said that "there absolutely are images in [his] head when [he] writes", making The Car, their "most cinematic sounding record". There's a "grandiose, cinematic quality" that "carries on throughout the album" "while making things more grander, colorful and cinematic." Talking about Mr Schwartz, he said he imagined the character present while "a production is going on".

=== Voice ===
In the early years of his career, Turner performed in a strong Sheffield dialect. Simon Armitage remarked: "I can't think of another singer whose regional identity has been so unapologetically and naturally intoned through his singing voice." By 2018's Tranquility Base Hotel, Alexis Petridis of The Guardian said: "The Yorkshire dialect that was once his USP is now deployed sparingly, as a jolting effect." On his accent change, former Arctic Monkeys bassist Andy Nicholson, said: "I don't think he thinks he's Elvis, I don't think he's an actor, I think he sometimes probably can live up to the character people are expecting him to be. I mean, he has lived in America, he lived in New York for a long time, and he lived in LA for a long time […] he soaks accents up a lot, 'cause when he started hanging around with Miles quite a lot, he started to get a bit of a Scouse twinge to his accent." One critic said that the tone of Turner's voice has also transformed over time, from a "fidgety whine" to "a worn-in baritone croon". About his vocals, Turner told Rolling Stone Germany, "I find the sound and presentation of the voice to be at least as meaningful as the lyrics." He has noted that the formation of the Last Shadow Puppets was the first time he had "even begun to explore the idea of singing [...] This more classic style of songwriting led to me using my voice in a different way".

=== Stage persona ===
"When you think about that, and the clothes, I wasn't doing that with Suck It and See or Humbug. It wasn't grease in the hair. Normally, the record you make encourages a certain style of performance. But thinking about the performer in relation to Tranquility, or even this thing – [The Car] – I have considered that you can invert that. The performer can influence the music, rather than the other way around."

— Turner about Performance and BRIT Awards Speech, 2022

In an otherwise positive review of a 2006 show, Richard Cromelin of the Los Angeles Times noted that Turner seemed "a little spooked by the attention" and hoped he would learn "to reach out more to the audience" in time. In 2007, Kitty Empire of The Observer noted that he was a "reserved" presence on stage: "He chats a bit to about 15 people in the middle of the front rows, and only looks up at the balcony, once, a little apprehensively." Following Arctic Monkeys' headlining appearance at Glastonbury Festival in 2007, Rosie Swash of The Guardian remarked upon Turner's "steady, wry stage presence": "Arctic Monkeys don't do ad-libbing, they don't do crowd interaction, and they don't do encores." Simon Price of The Independent said Turner seemed "to freeze like a rabbit in the spotlights" during a headlining set at Reading Festival in 2009.

In late 2011, Turner began to change his stage persona and style, most notably changing his hairstyle to a "rockabilly-inspired quiff". Brian Hiatt of Rolling Stone noted of his "newfound showmanship" that he "puts his guitar down to strut and dance, drops to his knees for solos when he does play, [and] flirts shamelessly with the female fans". In reviewing a 2013 concert, Dorian Lynskey of The Guardian said, "Turner, a shy sort for a frontman, used to seem unnerved by attention and he's coped by adopting a tongue-in-cheek persona that suggests a comic-strip version of a 50s rock star, a Blackpool Buddy Holly: all quiff and quips. It's a curious pose, entertaining but alienating in the same way as some of his more arch lyrics. [...] Turner always holds something back, which makes the band more interesting but somewhat distant." Ben Beaumont-Thomas of The Guardian noted in 2018 that Turner ironically "played with the role" of being a rockstar but simultaneously "can't help but be a real rock star". While reviewing a 2023 concert, Sian Cain of The Guardian said, "There are few frontmen touring today who lean into the theatrics of rockstardom as effortlessly as Alex Turner", and felt there were similarities to the performance styles of Bob Dylan and David Byrne, adding, "He's fond of a campy turn and stare".

Turner has described public speaking as almost being his "worst nightmare" and does not consider himself a "born performer", stating that he "enjoy[s] the studio side of it more than touring". Although an admitted "control freak" by nature, he describes being a frontman as an "awkward" and "strange" experience that he does not "take too seriously". He said, "I can't go out there and absolutely be myself. The situation is so fundamentally unnatural. [...] It's not a full-on, 'right, get into character' thing ... [sometimes] part of how you actually feel comes out. But I think I always feel weird about that afterwards." Turner felt that being on stage and his songwriting are "a series of intermittent interpretations and impersonations of various artists I admire [...] colliding aggressively and rapidly enough with one another that the origins of the inspiration are largely obscured and from it comes something original."

In a 2022 interview with The Guardian, referencing his 2014 BRIT Awards speech, Turner acknowledged for the first time the use of personas, separating himself from what he described as, the "performer" – a fractured reflection of himself– of each album. Turner has named one of his former "performers" Mr Snarl, due to the disdainful way in which he sang, Turner said "Sometimes Mr. Snarl shows up", further adding, "It feels completely insane to embody this guy singing to a carpeted room. There I stand, staring at the carpet and wondering how do you sing a damn song like 'Teddy Picker'? But I'm counting on it all making sense again once other people are in the room."

== Personal life ==
Despite significant media attention, Turner rarely discusses his personal life. From 2005 to January 2007, he dated English musician Johanna Bennett and she was credited as a co-writer on "Fluorescent Adolescent". He started dating English model and television personality Alexa Chung in July 2007, and left Sheffield in March 2008, to live with her in London. In the spring of 2009, they moved to Williamsburg, Brooklyn, New York City together, but later relocated to London. They ended their relationship in July 2011 and briefly reunited in the summer of 2014. From late 2011 to early 2014, he dated American actress and model Arielle Vandenberg. In March 2015, he started dating American model Taylor Bagley. They lived together in Los Angeles and their relationship came to an end in July 2018. He began dating French singer-songwriter Verlo in mid–2018.

He is an avid reader and has cited authors Joseph Conrad, Ernest Hemingway, Vladimir Nabokov, David Foster Wallace, and George Saunders as some of his favourites. He is also a cinephile, and has shown interest in photography, a hobby he shares with bandmate Matt Helders. He is a fan of the works of Stanley Kubrick, Federico Fellini, Jean-Pierre Melville, and Rainer Werner Fassbinder among others. Turner is a supporter of Sheffield Wednesday F.C. and practices Muay Thai in his free time. Turner has shown his appreciation for biker culture and got his A licence in 2011. He has since owned a customised Yamaha XS 650 and a Kawasaki W800.

=== Politics ===
Turner was reticent to voice his political opinions, and let them show in his music: "I'm aware of what's going on to a degree, but… I just don't think I'm equipped to soundtrack the times. There might be someone out there who can do that, but I haven't cracked it." After the release of Tranquility Base Hotel & Casino Turner said: "I'd never wanted anything political to get into the music and that was because I didn't know how to do it. It's not as though these are protest songs necessarily, but I'm more confident about putting myself across." Adding, "I seem to remember feeling like I hadn't given sufficient consideration to these issues to be able to discuss them, which I'm not sure is necessarily a bad attitude towards it. They often are complex."

Speaking on the 2011 England riots, he criticised the lack of analysis the media had regarding the causes that originated the violence. In an interview with The Sunday Times, Turner said he voted remain in the Brexit referendum, and so did his close circle. At the time Turner was living in Los Angeles and felt disappointed with the result: "I woke up with a bitter, strange taste in my mouth. Especially when we had to put on the glitter jacket, go on stage and ensure the show. Strangely, it makes me want to come back and live in England: we can not leave the country to those who want to isolate it. Many of my American friends said they would go live in Canada if Trump was elected. Yet it is now that the United States needs them most. Otherwise, we let the ditches widen."

In 2014, it became known that Turner and the rest of Arctic Monkeys were involved in Liberty's tax avoidance scheme. Each member paid between £38,000 and £84,000 in fees to shelter between £557,000 and £1.1 million between 2005 and 2009. In the same Times' interview, Turner said, "We were given some poor advice and I made a poor decision, but I always paid my taxes in full, on time," he further added that they saw the possibility of paying less tax, but pulled out of the scheme when they realised it was not the right thing to do.

== Discography ==
=== Solo ===
- Submarine (EP, 2011)

=== Arctic Monkeys ===
- Whatever People Say I Am, That's What I'm Not (2006)
- Favourite Worst Nightmare (2007)
- Humbug (2009)
- Suck It and See (2011)
- AM (2013)
- Tranquility Base Hotel & Casino (2018)
- The Car (2022)

=== The Last Shadow Puppets ===
- The Age of the Understatement (2008)
- Everything You've Come to Expect (2016)

=== Collaborations ===
- 2007 – Reverend and the Makers – The State of Things (writer and vocalist on "The Machine", co-writer of "He Said He Loved Me" and "Armchair Detective")
- 2007 – Dizzee Rascal – Maths + English ("Temptation")
- 2008 – Matt Helders – Late Night Tales: Matt Helders ("A Choice of Three")
- 2011 – Miles Kane – Colour of the Trap (co-writer of "Rearrange", "Counting Down the Days", "Happenstance", "Telepathy", "Better Left Invisible" and "Colour of the Trap")
- 2012 – Miles Kane – First of My Kind EP (co-writer of "First of My Kind")
- 2013 – Miles Kane – Don't Forget Who You Are (co-writer and bassist on B-side "Get Right")
- 2013 – Queens of the Stone Age – ...Like Clockwork (guest vocalist on "If I Had a Tail")
- 2015 – Mini Mansions – The Great Pretenders (co-writer and guest vocalist on "Vertigo", co-writer on "Valet")
- 2015 – Alexandra Savior – True Detective season 2 original soundtrack (co-composed song "Risk" on guitar, keyboard, drums)
- 2017 – Alexandra Savior – Belladonna of Sadness (co-writer, co-producer, bass, guitar, keyboards, and synthesizers)
