= I Bet You Look Good on the Dancefloor =

2005 single by Arctic Monkeys

Single by Arctic Monkeys

from the album Whatever People Say I Am, That's What I'm Not
- Released: 17 October 2005
- Studio: The Chapel (Lincolnshire)
- Genre: Garage rock; indie rock; post-punk; punk rock; post-Britpop
- Length: 2:54
- Label: Domino
- Composers: Jamie Cook; Matt Helders; Andy Nicholson; Alex Turner
- Lyricist: Alex Turner
- Producer: Jim Abbiss

Arctic Monkeys singles chronology
"I Bet You Look Good on the Dancefloor" (2005)	"When the Sun Goes Down" (2006)

Audio sample
- file; help

Music video
- "I Bet You Look Good on the Dancefloor" on YouTube

"I Bet You Look Good on the Dancefloor" is the debut single by English rock band Arctic Monkeys released on 17 October 2005 through Domino Recording Company. The song was the band's debut single and the first from their debut studio album, Whatever People Say I Am, That's What I'm Not (2006). Written by frontman Alex Turner and produced by Jim Abbiss, "I Bet You Look Good on the Dancefloor" is a garage rock, indie rock, and post-punk song. It debuted at number one on the UK Singles Chart on 23 October 2005, and remains one of the band's best-known songs in the UK.

The track was recorded during sessions at 2fly Studios in Sheffield and Chapel Studios in Lincolnshire.

The accompanying music video, filmed in a single take at a youth club in Sheffield, reinforced the band's unpretentious image and connection to their local roots. The song has since become a staple of Arctic Monkeys' live performances and is frequently cited as one of the defining tracks of the 2000s indie rock revival. It has featured on numerous "best of" lists and continues to be celebrated as a landmark debut single in British rock music.

== Composition and lyrics ==
The song was recorded three times with different producers, the first version with Alan Smyth, and another with James Ford and Rich Costey, before landing on Abiss' version.

The line "Your name isn't Rio, but I don't care for sand" is a reference to Duran Duran's song "Rio." The song also has references to Romeo and Juliet.

== Single artwork ==
The single cover features a young girl, wearing a trainee badge, working the cash register at a supermarket, and has the song title and the name of the band, over-imposed in white inside of two black rectangles. The girl in the picture, named Jessie May Cuffe, was discovered at a bar by Juno Creative, a Liverpool design company. Cuffe, 16 years old at the time, was chosen for the shoot, which took place at a SPAR in Liverpool. She wore a fake uniform, being mistaken for a store worker by customers.

== Music video ==
The video is a live recording of the band playing the song in a studio with a small audience watching with both the video and audio taken live. Alex Turner introduces the band and the song and asks viewers not to "believe the hype". The video was shot using three Ikegami 3-tube colour television cameras from the 1980s to give it a more aged effect. The video was inspired by BBC2's television music show The Old Grey Whistle Test.

== Legacy ==
Laura Snapes of The Guardian described the legacy of the single as one of "creation, destruction and transition." The distribution method of their early songs ushered in a new way of releasing music. In 2004, iTunes launched in the UK and accounted for 17.9% of that year's singles chart; by 2005, that number had more than doubled to 36.6%, with the band serving as a catalyst for this shift.

For music writer Tom Ewing, the rise of the band "gave the impression that a return to the Britpop boom time was upon us." Music business journalist Eamonn Forde thought "Arctic Monkeys were one of those acts, certainly at the mainstream level, that brought those two things together," in regards to the way the Internet could be seen as both a distribution channel and a social space. Mike Smith, who signed the band to EMI Publishing, stated that "Arctic Monkeys created a model that’s absolutely dominant today. The fact that you’re clicking on music to listen to as you did with them – they heralded what we’ve come to live in now." Talent agent and television producer Alison Howe remarked that the week of the single's release "felt like a moment that a generation would remember for the rest of their lives."

In February 2008, Alan Wilder, former member of Depeche Mode, criticised the mastering of the song in an open letter on the Side-Line Magazine website. He described its sound as "a bombardment of the most unsubtle, one-dimensional noise." On 27 July 2012, once the athletes had gathered in the centre of the stadium, the band performed the song and a cover of The Beatles' "Come Together" at the 2012 Summer Olympics opening ceremony.

== Accolades ==
On 23 February 2006, the track won Best Track at the 2006 NME Awards—one of three awards won by Arctic Monkeys. One of the B-sides, "Chun-Li's Spinning Bird Kick," was nominated for Best Rock Instrumental Performance at the 2007 Grammy Awards.

"I Bet You Look Good on the Dancefloor" has featured on numerous "best of" lists published by British music publication NME. In May 2007, the song was ranked No. 10 on the 50 Greatest Indie Anthems Ever, No. 11 on the150 Best Tracks of the Past 15 Years list in October 2011, and in January 2014, it was ranked No. 7 on the 500 Greatest Songs of All Time. NME stated that the song is "the perfect encapsulation of what it is to be young, pissed, lusty, angry and skint in modern day Britain."

== Cover versions ==
The Sugababes confirmed in January 2006 that the B-side to "Red Dress" would be a cover version of "I Bet You Look Good on the Dancefloor", which replaced the group's 2005 single "Push the Button" at number one on the UK Singles Chart. Upon the recording of the B-side, the Sugababes said: "When our bosses asked us to think of covers for the B-side, we knew which song we would all love to do." Ben Thompson of The Observer praised Berrabah's "bluesy rasp" as a novelty, while Jimmy Draper of Time Out wrote: "It transforms the punky rave-up into a disco stomper that could make even the staunchiest pop-hater get up and dance."

In June 2007, Tom Jones confirmed he would perform a cover of the track at the Concert for Diana. Jones revealed he was a big fan of the band and wanted to do something different, stating, "It's a great song and I wanted to do it as a surprise for the Princess Diana concert. I haven't been in touch with the lads about it but I hope that they like it." On 1 July 2007, Jones and Joe Perry of Aerosmith performed it live for the celebration at Wembley Stadium. Reviews of the performance were negative, with The Guardian saying the cover sounded good on paper, but live "it proved horribly wrong." The Times thought Jones should "plead forgiveness" for his decision to cover the track. When asked if Jones had received any feedback from the band, he responded, "No. The only feedback we got were the reviews which said we’d ruined it! We were going to release it, but the reviews were so bad we thought better of putting it out!”

The song was covered by British funk band Baby Charles and released as a single in 2009. Jayson Greene of Pitchfork was positive towards the cover, and thought the band found, "an easy slinkiness in the groove that feels right for Alex Turner's sidelong, cutting observations." Australian band The Vines released a cover of the song as a bonus track on the Japanese edition of their album Future Primitive, released 3 June 2011.

== Track listings ==
All lyrics are written by Alex Turner; all music is composed by Arctic Monkeys

UK CD single, US 10-inch vinyl
No.	Title	Length
1.	"I Bet You Look Good on the Dancefloor"	2:54
2.	"Bigger Boys and Stolen Sweethearts"	2:59
3.	"Chun-Li's Spinning Bird Kick"	4:40

UK 7-inch single
No.	Title	Length
1.	"I Bet You Look Good on the Dancefloor"	2:54
2.	"Bigger Boys and Stolen Sweethearts"	2:59

== Personnel ==
Arctic Monkeys

- Alex Turner – lead vocals, guitar
- Jamie Cook – guitar
- Andy Nicholson – bass guitar
- Matt Helders – drums, backing vocals

Technical

- Jim Abbiss – production, recording
- Ewan Davies – recording
- Simon 'Barny' Barnicott – mixing
- Owen Skinner – mixing assistance
- George Marino – mastering

== Charts ==
=== Weekly charts ===
Weekly chart performance for "I Bet You Look Good on the Dancefloor"
Chart (2005–2006)	Peak position
Australia (ARIA)	18
Belgium (Ultratop 50 Wallonia)	17
Canada Rock Top 30 (Radio & Records)	12
Denmark (Tracklisten)	15
Europe (Eurochart Hot 100)	7
France (SNEP)	100
Ireland (IRMA)	12
Netherlands (Single Top 100)	99
New Zealand (Recorded Music NZ)	14
Scottish Singles Sales (Official Charts)	1
UK Singles (Official Charts)	1
UK Indie (Official Charts)	1
US Alternative Airplay (Billboard)	7
US Bubbling Under Hot 100 (Billboard)	17

=== Year-end charts ===
2005 year-end chart performance for "I Bet You Look Good on the Dancefloor"
Chart (2005)	Position
UK Singles (OCC)	17

2006 year-end chart performance for "I Bet You Look Good on the Dancefloor"
Chart (2006)	Position
UK Singles (OCC)	127
US Alternative Songs (Billboard)	37

== Certifications ==
Certifications for "I Bet You Look Good on the Dancefloor"
Region	Certification	Certified units/sales
Canada (Music Canada)	Platinum	80,000^{‡}
Italy (FIMI)	Gold	50,000^{‡}
Spain (Promusicae)	Gold	30,000^{‡}
United Kingdom (BPI)	5× Platinum	3,000,000^{‡}
United States (RIAA)	Platinum	1,000,000^{‡}
^{‡} Sales+streaming figures based on certification alone.

== Release history ==
Release dates and formats for "I Bet You Look Good on the Dancefloor"
Region	Date	Format(s)	Label
United Kingdom	17 October 2005	7-inch vinyl; CD	Domino
Australia	13 February 2006	CD	Domino
United States	14 March 2006	—N/a	Domino
