= Andy Nicholson =

English musician (born 1986)

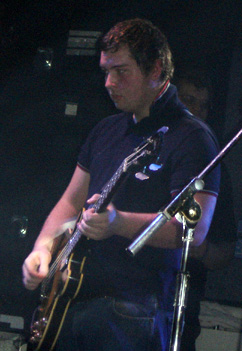
- Nicholson performing with the Arctic Monkeys in 2006

Background information
- Also known as: AndyGun; Goldteeth
- Born: April 9, 1986 (age 40)
- Origin: Hillsborough, Sheffield, England
- Genres: Indie rock; electronica; post-punk revival; garage rock; hip hop
- Occupation: Musician
- Instrument: Bass guitar
- Member of: Clubs & Spades; Sticky Blood
- Formerly of: Arctic Monkeys; Lords of Flatbush; Mongrel; The Book Club; Reverend and the Makers

Andy James Nicholson (born 9 April 1986) is an English musician, best known as the original bassist of the rock band Arctic Monkeys, which he left in 2006. In 2008, he founded Mongrel with Jon McClure of Reverend and the Makers. In 2009, he became the bassist for ex-Milburn frontman Joe Carnall's band The Book Club, but left later that year to join Reverend and the Makers. He is currently producing and performing in the hip-hop group Clubs & Spades with Maticmouth from Reverend Soundsystem.

== Biography ==
=== Early days ===
An attendee of Stocksbridge High School, Nicholson was the only member of the Arctic Monkeys to not live in the High Green district, residing in nearby Hillsborough. Nicholson played bass guitar, and was seen as "the band wit, reliably swift with a self-deprecating quip". He played on Whatever People Say I Am, That's What I'm Not and the EPs Five Minutes with Arctic Monkeys and Who the Fuck Are Arctic Monkeys?

=== Departure from Arctic Monkeys ===
The band announced in May 2006 that Nicholson would miss the band's forthcoming North America tour as he was suffering from "fatigue following an intensive period of touring", and would be temporarily replaced by Nick O'Malley of The Dodgems while Nicholson recovered. However, on 20 June 2006, it was announced that he was no longer part of the band, with Alex Turner later stating "we sorta found ourselves in a situation where we wanted to move forward". The band asked Nicholson to leave. Drummer Matt Helders later remarked: "It's not for everyone, the travelling, I suppose ... He didn't get specific. We didn't want to drag all of that out of him ... We took [Nick] out to America and we just couldn't see going back to the way things were for whatever reason."

It was not until 2019 that Nicholson himself opened up on his departure. In an interview with podcast The Michael Anthony Show, Nicholson told the host that leaving the band that he co-founded was "soul destroying". The bassist added that news of his imminent departure came as a huge shock and was far from mutual. Nicholson went on to detail the meeting that ended his time in the band and also painted a vivid picture of life in the years that followed, which included struggles with mental health as well as a new search for identity. Despite this, Nicholson did state that he has since been on good terms with his former bandmates, with them often meeting up whenever they return to Sheffield.

=== Post-Arctic Monkeys ===
Initially, Nicholson began making a name for himself in Sheffield as a DJ, mainly as a resident at Threads, but also performing at Reverend Soundsystem (under the name AndyGun). He also remixed a Reverend and the Makers song "You Get So Alone Sometimes it Just Makes Sense". In November 2007 he made his DJ debut in London at a club event called Threads vs Filthy Few.

In 2008, Nicholson formed Mongrel, which consisted of himself, Jon McClure of Reverend and the Makers, Babyshambles bassist Drew McConnell and Matt Helders from Arctic Monkeys, as well as London rapper Lowkey from the Poisonous Poets. They released their lone album, Better Than Heavy on 7 March 2009.

He was also in the band Lords of Flatbush, with Sheffield-based singer Steve Edwards and Louis Carnall formerly of Milburn, but left to concentrate on Mongrel. The position was handed over to his brother Rob Nicholson of Sheffield band Dead World Leaders.

In August 2009, Nicholson joined ex-Milburn frontman Joe Carnall's band The Book Club, but left later that year when, on 23 December Jon McClure announced via his Twitter account and official website that Nicholson would be made an official member of Reverend and the Makers (having made occasional live appearances with them prior to this). He remained in the group until their 2010 hiatus but when they reformed in January 2012 Nicholson was replaced by his friend and former bandmate in The Book Club, Joe Carnall.

Nicholson is currently producing and performing in hip-hop group Clubs & Spades with Maticmouth from Reverend Soundsystem. They made their live debut at The Plug on Saturday 20 July 2013 as part of Tramlines Festival and their debut album Stand Up was released on Monday 22 July 2013. He is also part of production duo Sticky Blood with Jamie Shield.

As of 2019, Nicholson has been writing, recording and producing music under the name Goldteeth. In 2024, he played bass for hip-hop group Kneecap on the track "Better Way To Live", from their album Fine Art, alongside members of rock band Fontaines D.C. and producer Toddla T.

In late 2025, Nicholson announced he was releasing a photo book I Bet This Looks Good on Your Coffee Table referencing the Arctic Monkeys song "I Bet You Look Good on the Dancefloor". The book contains photos of the band taken by Nicholson between 2005 and 2007.

== Political views ==
In November 2019, along with 34 other musicians, Nicholson signed a letter endorsing the Labour Party leader Jeremy Corbyn in the 2019 UK general election with a call to end austerity.
