= Tranquility Base Hotel & Casino Tour =

2018–19 concert tour by Arctic Monkeys

- Tour by Arctic Monkeys
- Location: North America; South America; Europe; Oceania
- Associated album: Tranquility Base Hotel & Casino
- Start date: 2 May 2018
- End date: 7 April 2019
- Legs: 9
- No. of shows: 86
- Box office: $40.8 million (61 shows)

Arctic Monkeys concert chronology
- AM Tour (2013–14); Tranquility Base Hotel & Casino Tour (2018–19); The Car Tour (2022–23)

The Tranquility Base Hotel & Casino Tour was the sixth headlining concert tour by English indie rock band Arctic Monkeys in support of their sixth studio album, Tranquility Base Hotel & Casino. The tour began on May 2, 2018, in San Diego, United States, at The Observatory North Park and concluded on April 7, 2019, in Bogotá, Colombia, at Estéreo Picnic Festival. This marks their first tour since the AM Tour (2013–2014).

== Development ==
The group announced their first North American headlining shows since 2014 and several festival dates on 12 March 2018. On 5 April, the group announced the release of their sixth studio album, Tranquility Base Hotel & Casino, to be released on 11 May. The group announced United Kingdom and Ireland dates on 9 April. In April, they announced extra dates in the United Kingdom and United States. In November, the group announced Latin American dates.

On 20 June 2019, the band released a video documenting one of the final shows of the tour at the Foro Sol stadium in Mexico City.

== Songs performed ==
Whatever People Say I Am, That's What I'm Not

- "The View from the Afternoon"
- "I Bet You Look Good on the Dancefloor"
- "Dancing Shoes"
- "Mardy Bum" (Note: Only two verses performed with Alex solo over drum loop)
- "From the Ritz to the Rubble"
- "A Certain Romance" (Note: Shortened version performed with Alex solo over drum loop)

Favourite Worst Nightmare

- "Brianstorm"
- "Teddy Picker"
- "Fluorescent Adolescent" (Note: Piano version of first verse only)
- "Do Me a Favour"
- "505"

Humbug

- "Crying Lightning"
- "Cornerstone"
- "Pretty Visitors"

Suck It and See

- "The Hellcat Spangled Shalalala"
- "Don't Sit Down 'Cause I've Moved Your Chair"
- "Library Pictures"

AM

- "Do I Wanna Know?"
- "R U Mine?"
- "One for the Road"
- "Arabella"
- "No.1 Party Anthem"
- "Mad Sounds"
- "Fireside"
- "Why'd You Only Call Me When You're High?"
- "Snap Out of It"
- "Knee Socks"

Tranquility Base Hotel & Casino

- "Star Treatment"
- "One Point Perspective"
- "American Sports"
- "Tranquility Base Hotel & Casino"
- "Four Out of Five"
- "Science Fiction"
- "She Looks Like Fun"
- "Batphone"
- "The Ultracheese"

B-sides

- "You're So Dark"

Covers

- "Lipstick Vogue" by Elvis Costello & the Attractions
- "Is This It" by The Strokes
- "The Union Forever" by The White Stripes

== Set list ==
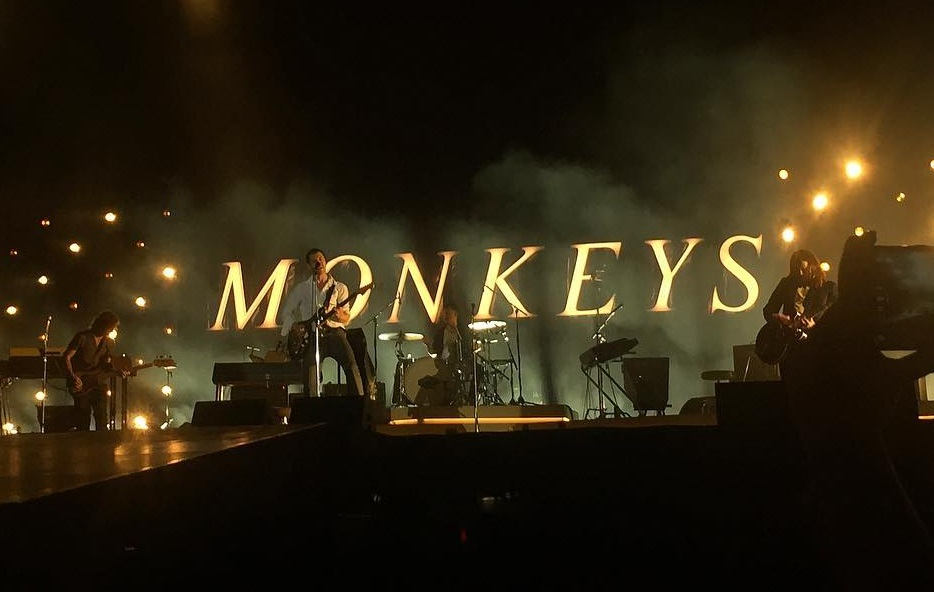
The band performing in 2018

Average set-list for the tour according to setlist.fm

1. "Four Out of Five"
2. "Brianstorm"
3. "Don't Sit Down 'Cause I've Moved Your Chair"
4. "Crying Lightning"
5. "Teddy Picker"
6. "Snap Out Of It"
7. "505"
8. "Do Me A Favour"
9. "Tranquility Base Hotel & Casino"
10. "One Point Perspective"
11. "Do I Wanna Know?"
12. "Cornerstone"
13. "Why'd You Only Call Me When You're High?"
14. "Knee Socks"
15. "I Bet You Look Good on the Dancefloor"
16. "Arabella"
17. "One for the Road"
18. "Pretty Visitors"

Encore

19. "The View from the Afternoon"
20. "Star Treatment"
21. "R U Mine?"

== Tour dates ==
List of concerts, showing date, city, country, venue, opening acts, tickets sold, number of available tickets and amount of gross revenue
Date	City	Country	Venue	Opening acts	Attendance	Revenue
Leg 1 – USA (May)
2 May 2018	San Diego	United States	The Observatory North Park	Cameron Avery	—	—
3 May 2018	San Diego	United States	The Observatory North Park	Cameron Avery	—	—
5 May 2018	Los Angeles	United States	Hollywood Forever Cemetery	Cameron Avery	—	—
9 May 2018	Brooklyn	United States	Brooklyn Steel	Cameron Avery	—	—
Leg 2 – Europe (May - June)
22 May 2018	Berlin	Germany	Columbiahalle	Cameron Avery	—	—
23 May 2018	Berlin	Germany	Columbiahalle	Cameron Avery	—	—
26 May 2018	Rome	Italy	Cavea Auditorium	Cameron Avery	—	—
27 May 2018	Rome	Italy	Cavea Auditorium	Cameron Avery	—	—
29 May 2018	Paris	France	Zénith	Cameron Avery	—	—
30 May 2018	Paris	France	Zénith	Cameron Avery	—	—
2 June 2018 (Note: The concert on 2 June 2018 at Parc del Fòrum in Barcelona was part of Primavera Sound.)	Barcelona	Spain	Parc del Fòrum	—N/a	—N/a	—N/a
4 June 2018	Milan	Italy	Mediolanum Forum	Cameron Avery	—	—
7 June 2018	London	England	Royal Albert Hall	Cameron Avery	—	—
8 June 2018 (Note: The concert on 8 June 2018 at Safaripark Beekse Bergen in Hilvarenbeek was part of Best Kept Secret.)	Hilvarenbeek	Netherlands	Safaripark Beekse Bergen	—N/a	—N/a	—N/a
Leg 3 – USA (June)
15 June 2018 (Note: The concert on 15 June 2018 at The Woodlands of Dover International Speedway in Dover was part of Firefly Music Festival.)	Dover	United States	The Woodlands of Dover International Speedway	—N/a	—N/a	—N/a
16 June 2018	Raleigh	United States	Red Hat Amphitheater	The Nude Party	—	—
18 June 2018	Nashville	United States	Ascend Amphitheater	The Nude Party	—	—
19 June 2018	Atlanta	United States	Coca-Cola Roxy	The Nude Party	—	—
Leg 4 – Europe (June - July)
22 June 2018 (Note: The concert on 22 June 2018 at Neuhausen ob Eck Airfield in Neuhausen ob Eck was part of Southside Festival.)	Neuhausen ob Eck	Germany	Neuhausen ob Eck Airfield	—N/a	—N/a	—N/a
24 June 2018 (Note: The concert on 24 June 2018 at Eichenring in Scheeßel was part of Hurricane Festival.)	Scheeßel	Germany	Eichenring	—N/a	—N/a	—N/a
26 June 2018	Düsseldorf	Germany	Mitsubishi Electric Halle	Cameron Avery	—	—
27 June 2018	Copenhagen	Denmark	Royal Arena	Cameron Avery	—	—
1 July 2018 (Note: The concert on 1 July 2018 at Glasgow Green in Glasgow was part of TRNSMT.)	Glasgow	Scotland	Glasgow Green	—N/a	—N/a	—N/a
4 July 2018 (Note: The concert on 4 July 2018 at Gdynia-Kosakowo Airport in Gdynia was part of Open'er Festival.)	Gdynia	Poland	Gdynia-Kosakowo Airport	—N/a	—N/a	—N/a
6 July 2018 (Note: The concert on 6 July 2018 at Terra Vibe Park in Malakasa was part of Rockwave Festival.)	Malakasa	Greece	Terra Vibe Park	—N/a	—N/a	—N/a
8 July 2018 (Note: The concert on 8 July 2018 at Werchter Festivalpark in Werchter was part of Rock Werchter.)	Werchter	Belgium	Werchter Festivalpark	—N/a	—N/a	—N/a
10 July 2018 (Note: The concert on 10 July 2018 at Ancient Theatre of Fourvière in Lyon was part of Nuits de Fourvière.)	Lyon	France	Ancient Theatre of Fourvière	—N/a	—N/a	—N/a
12 July 2018 (Note: The concert on 12 July 2018 at Passeio Marítimo de Algés in Lisbon was part of NOS Alive.)	Lisbon	Portugal	Passeio Marítimo de Algés	—N/a	—N/a	—N/a
13 July 2018 (Note: The concert on 13 July 2018 at Espacio Mad Cool in Valdebebas (a northern Madrid neighborhood) was part of Mad Cool Festival.)	Madrid	Spain	Espacio Mad Cool Valdebebas	—N/a	—N/a	—N/a
Leg 5 – North America (July - August)
24 July 2018	New York City	United States	Forest Hills Stadium	Mini Mansions	—	—
25 July 2018	Canandaigua	United States	Constellation Brands – Marvin Sands Performing Arts Center	Mini Mansions	—	—
27 July 2018	Boston	United States	TD Garden	Mini Mansions	—	—
28 July 2018	Washington, D.C.	United States	The Anthem	Mini Mansions	12,000 / 12,000	$656,030
29 July 2018	Washington, D.C.	United States	The Anthem	Mini Mansions	12,000 / 12,000	$656,030
31 July 2018	Pittsburgh	United States	Petersen Events Center	Mini Mansions	—	—
1 August 2018	Detroit	United States	Masonic Temple Theater	Mini Mansions	—	—
2 August 2018 (Note: The concert on 2 August 2018 at Grant Park in Chicago was part of Lollapalooza.)	Chicago	United States	Grant Park	—N/a	—N/a	—N/a
4 August 2018 (Note: The concert on 4 August 2018 at Parc Jean-Drapeau in Montreal was part of Osheaga Festival.)	Montreal	Canada	Parc Jean-Drapeau	—N/a	—N/a	—N/a
5 August 2018	Toronto	Canada	Scotiabank Arena	Mini Mansions	—	—
Leg 6 – Europe (August - September)
8 August 2018 (Note: The concert on 8 August 2018 at Middelalderparken in Oslo was part of Øyafestivalen.)	Oslo	Norway	Tøyenparken	—N/a	—N/a	—N/a
9 August 2018 (Note: The concert on 9 August 2018 at Slottsskogen in Gothenburg was part of Way Out West.)	Gothenburg	Sweden	Slottsskogen	—N/a	—N/a	—N/a
11 August 2018 (Note: The concert on 11 August 2018 at Suvilahti in Helsinki was part of Flow Festival.)	Helsinki	Finland	Suvilahti	—N/a	—N/a	—N/a
14 August 2018 (Note: The concert on 14 August 2018 at Óbudai-sziget in Budapest was part of Sziget Festival.)	Budapest	Hungary	Óbudai-sziget	—N/a	—N/a	—N/a
6 September 2018	Manchester	England	Manchester Arena	The Lemon Twigs	31,627 / 31,831	$2,456,500
7 September 2018	Manchester	England	Manchester Arena	The Lemon Twigs	31,627 / 31,831	$2,456,500
9 September 2018	London	England	The O_{2} Arena	The Lemon Twigs	73,084 / 75,871	$5,645,980
10 September 2018	London	England	The O_{2} Arena	The Lemon Twigs	73,084 / 75,871	$5,645,980
12 September 2018	London	England	The O_{2} Arena	The Lemon Twigs	73,084 / 75,871	$5,645,980
13 September 2018	London	England	The O_{2} Arena	The Lemon Twigs	73,084 / 75,871	$5,645,980
15 September 2018	Birmingham	England	Arena Birmingham	The Lemon Twigs	—	—
16 September 2018	Birmingham	England	Arena Birmingham	The Lemon Twigs	—	—
18 September 2018	Sheffield	England	FlyDSA Arena	The Lemon Twigs	—	—
19 September 2018	Sheffield	England	FlyDSA Arena	The Lemon Twigs	—	—
21 September 2018	Sheffield	England	FlyDSA Arena	The Lemon Twigs	—	—
22 September 2018	Sheffield	England	FlyDSA Arena	The Lemon Twigs	—	—
24 September 2018	Dublin	Ireland	3Arena	The Lemon Twigs	—	—
25 September 2018	Dublin	Ireland	3Arena	The Lemon Twigs	—	—
27 September 2018	Newcastle	England	Metro Radio Arena	The Lemon Twigs	—	—
28 September 2018	Newcastle	England	Metro Radio Arena	The Lemon Twigs	—	—
Leg 7 – North America (October)
7 October 2018 (Note: The concerts on 7 and 14 October 2018 were part of Austin City Limits Music Festival.)	Austin	United States	Zilker Park	—N/a	—N/a	—N/a
9 October 2018	Dallas	United States	South Side Ballroom	Mini Mansions	—	—
10 October 2018	Oklahoma City	United States	The Criterion	Mini Mansions	—	—
12 October 2018	Houston	United States	Revention Music Center	Mini Mansions	—	—
14 October 2018	Austin	United States	Zilker Park	—N/a	—N/a	—N/a
16 October 2018	Los Angeles	United States	Hollywood Bowl	The Lemon Twigs; Mini Mansions	—	—
17 October 2018	Los Angeles	United States	Hollywood Bowl	The Lemon Twigs; Mini Mansions	—	—
19 October 2018	Santa Barbara	United States	Santa Barbara Bowl	Mini Mansions	—	—
20 October 2018	San Francisco	United States	Bill Graham Civic Auditorium	Mini Mansions	—	—
21 October 2018	San Francisco	United States	Bill Graham Civic Auditorium	Mini Mansions	—	—
23 October 2018	Seattle	United States	WaMu Theater	Mini Mansions	—	—
24 October 2018	Portland	United States	Veterans Memorial Coliseum	Mini Mansions	—	—
25 October 2018	Vancouver	Canada	Pacific Coliseum	Mini Mansions	—	—
27 October 2018 (Note: The concert on 27 October 2018 at City Park in New Orleans was part of Voodoo Experience.)	New Orleans	United States	City Park	—N/a	—N/a	—N/a
Leg 8 – Australia & New Zealand
23 February 2019	Perth	Australia	RAC Arena	Mini Mansions	7,881 / 8,500	$517,264
26 February 2019	Melbourne	Australia	Rod Laver Arena	Mini Mansions	19,454 / 19,454	$1,309,330
27 February 2019	Melbourne	Australia	Rod Laver Arena	Mini Mansions	19,454 / 19,454	$1,309,330
1 March 2019	Sydney	Australia	Qudos Bank Arena	Mini Mansions	20,110 / 20,110	$1,350,187
2 March 2019	Sydney	Australia	Qudos Bank Arena	Mini Mansions	20,110 / 20,110	$1,350,187
3 March 2019	Brisbane	Australia	Brisbane Entertainment Centre	Mini Mansions	6,122 / 7,578	$409,266
6 March 2019	Auckland	New Zealand	Spark Arena	Mini Mansions	11,993 / 12,180	$804,852
Leg 9 – South America
22 March 2019 (Note: The concert on 22 March 2019 at Parque Fundidora in Monterrey was a part of Pal Norte.)	Monterrey	Mexico	Parque Fundidora	—N/a	—N/a	—N/a
24 March 2019	Mexico City	Mexico	Foro Sol	The Hives; Miles Kane	64,467 / 64,467	$3,490,224
26 March 2019	Lima	Peru	Jockey Club del Perú (Parcela H)	Los Outsaiders	21,400 / 21,400	$1,423,056
28 March 2019 (Note: The concert on 28 March 2019 at Espacio Idesa in Asunción was part of Asunciónico.)	Asunción	Paraguay	Espacio Idesa	—N/a	—N/a	—N/a
30 March 2019 (Note: The concert on 30 March 2019 at Hipódromo de San Isidro in Buenos Aires was part of Lollapalooza Argentina.)	Buenos Aires	Argentina	Hipódromo de San Isidro	—N/a	—N/a	—N/a
31 March 2019 (Note: The concert on 31 March 2019 at Parque O'Higgins in Santiago was part of Lollapalooza Chile.)	Santiago	Chile	Parque O'Higgins	—N/a	—N/a	—N/a
3 April 2019	Rio de Janeiro	Brazil	Jeunesse Arena	O Terno	10,395 / 12,800	$697,412
5 April 2019 (Note: The concert on 5 April 2019 at Autódromo de Interlagos in São Paulo was part of Lollapalooza Brazil.)	São Paulo	Brazil	Autódromo de Interlagos	—N/a	—N/a	—N/a
7 April 2019 (Note: The concert on 7 April 2019 at Parque Deportivo 222 in Bogotá was part of Estéreo Picnic Festival.)	Bogotá	Colombia	Campo de Golf Briceño 18	—N/a	—N/a	—N/a

== Personnel ==
=== Arctic Monkeys ===
- Alex Turner – lead vocals, electric guitar, acoustic guitar, baritone guitar, keyboards
- Jamie Cook – electric guitar, lap steel guitar, keyboards
- Nick O'Malley – bass guitar, backing vocals
- Matt Helders – drums, percussion, backing vocals

=== Touring members ===
- Scott Gillies – acoustic guitar, baritone guitar, lap steel guitar
- Tom Rowley – electric guitar, lap steel guitar, keyboards, percussion, backing vocals
- Davey Latter – percussion
- Tyler Parkford – keyboards, backing vocals

=== Guests ===
- Miles Kane – electric guitar on "505"
- Cam Avery – acoustic guitar on "Four Out of Five", keyboards on "Four Out of Five", "Tranquility Base Hotel & Casino" and "She Looks Like Fun", backing vocals on "Four Out of Five" and "She Looks Like Fun"
