= The Car Tour =

2022–23 concert tour by Arctic Monkeys

- Tour by Arctic Monkeys
- Location: North America; South America; Europe; Asia; Oceania
- Associated album: The Car
- Start date: 9 August 2022
- End date: 19 October 2023
- Legs: 8
- No. of shows: 119

Arctic Monkeys concert chronology
- Tranquility Base Hotel & Casino Tour (2018–19); The Car Tour (2022–23)

The Car Tour was the seventh headlining concert tour by English indie rock band Arctic Monkeys, launched in support of their seventh studio album, The Car (2022). The tour began on 9 August 2022 in Istanbul at Zorlu PSM, and concluded on 19 October 2023 in Dublin at 3Arena, visiting North America, South America, Oceania and Eurasia. This marks their first tour since Tranquility Base Hotel & Casino Tour (2018–2019), and features the band, alongside usual touring members, Scott Gillies, Tom Rowley, Davey Latter, and Tyler Parkford.

It has been noted that with this tour, the band is "taking their most intricate – and certainly least commercially viable – material to their biggest-ever shows."

== Background ==
Their previous tour, had significantly less dates than 2013' AM Tour, Ian McAndrew, the band's manager made that decision so the next tour [The Car] had a much bigger run of dates. The tour got pushed back three times due to the COVID-19 pandemic. "But even as this plan was sitting in place, the band continued to grow," he said.

In November 2021, the band announced a tour of Europe which began in August, In April and June they extended the tour into November 2022, with dates added in the United States and England, as well as Latin America. On 9 August, the band played live in Istanbul. This was the tour's opening performance, and the Arctic Monkeys' first performance since 2019. No new songs were debuted until their performance at Zürich OpenAir Festival on 23 August, where they played "I Ain't Quite Where I Think I Am". Other tracks debuted during their first leg of tour include "Mr. Schwartz", "Big Ideas" and "The Car", alongside singles, "There'd Better Be A Mirrorball" and "Body Paint". In June 2022 the band announced shows in Australia, with support from Australian bands, Mildlife, DMA's and The Buoys.

Their stadium tour was announced in September 2022, with dates in the UK, Ireland, North America, and Central Europe, finalizing in September 2023. Further European dates were added on December. The bands first ever tour of Asia was announced a few days later. The band also headlined several music festivals, including Sziget Festival, Lowlands, Pukkelpop, Rock en Seine, Reading and Leeds, Corona Capital, Rock Werchter, Bilbao BBK Live, NOS Alive, and different iterations of Primavera Sound and Falls Festival. In April 2023, the band announced two shows at Foro Sol in Mexico. For the tour, the group are joined by longtime touring members Tom Rowley, Davey Latter, and Tyler Parkford.

On June 19 the band had to cancel their show in Dublin due to Turner suffering from acute laryngitis. This marked the second time the band had to cancel shows for this reason, as Turner was also suffering from the illness during the AM Tour in 2013, which led to the postponement of three shows, on November of that year. The cancellation came ahead of the band headlining the Glastonbury Festival that weekend, leading to doubts over their ability to perform at the festival, with some media outlets even publishing informative pieces on the illness, in order to guess if Turner would be able to sing by that time. Hours before their set was supposed to take place, Glastonbury co-organiser, Emily Eavis, confirmed the band were ready to play that night. Two months later the band announced four shows in Ireland, to compensate for the cancelled gig in Dublin. Their show in the city on 19 October 2023 was the last of the tour. On their first show in Ireland the band was accompanied by a string section, which appeared on all the songs from The Car, but also on the tracks "505" and "Do I Wanna Know?"

== Opening acts ==
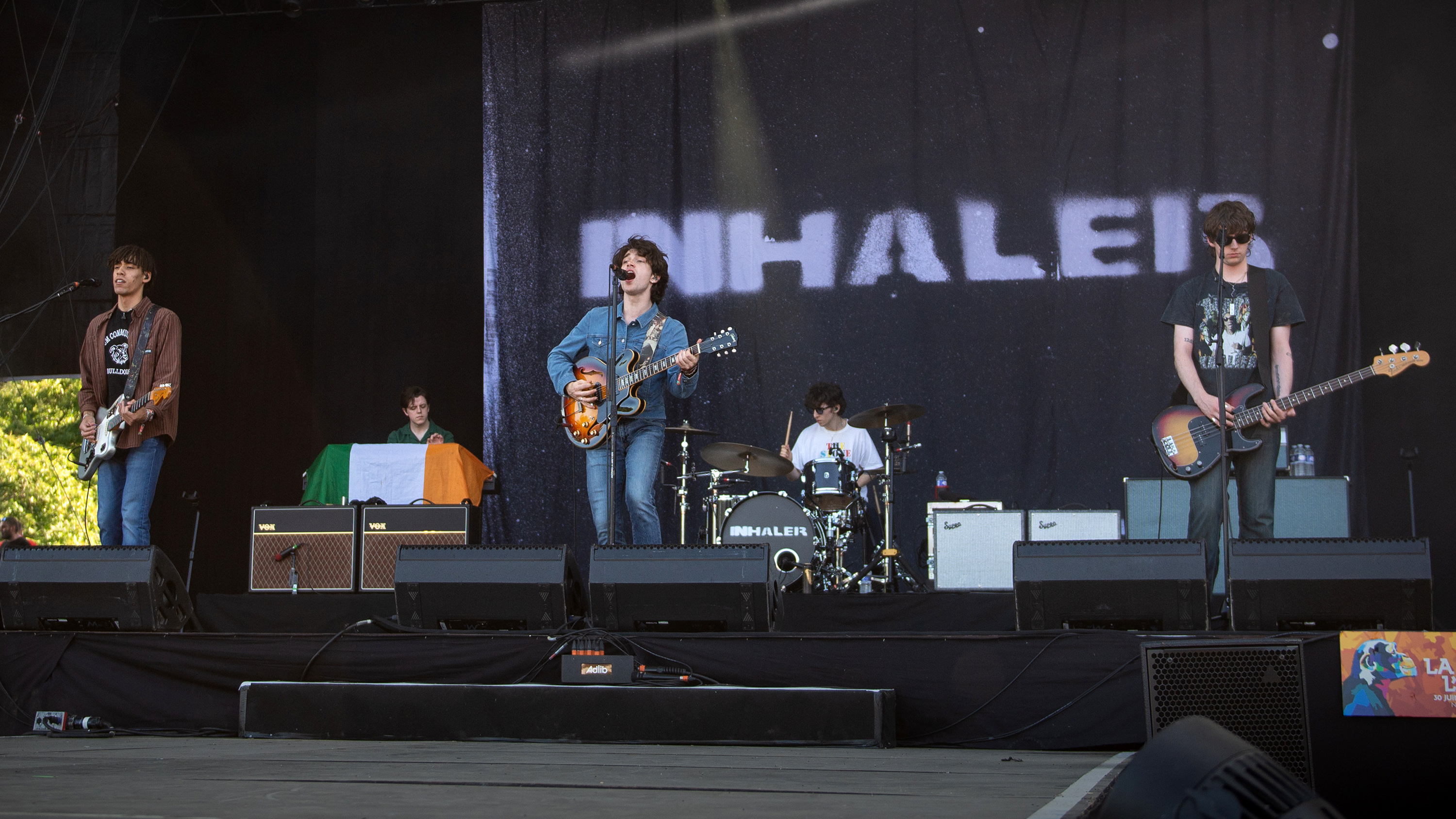
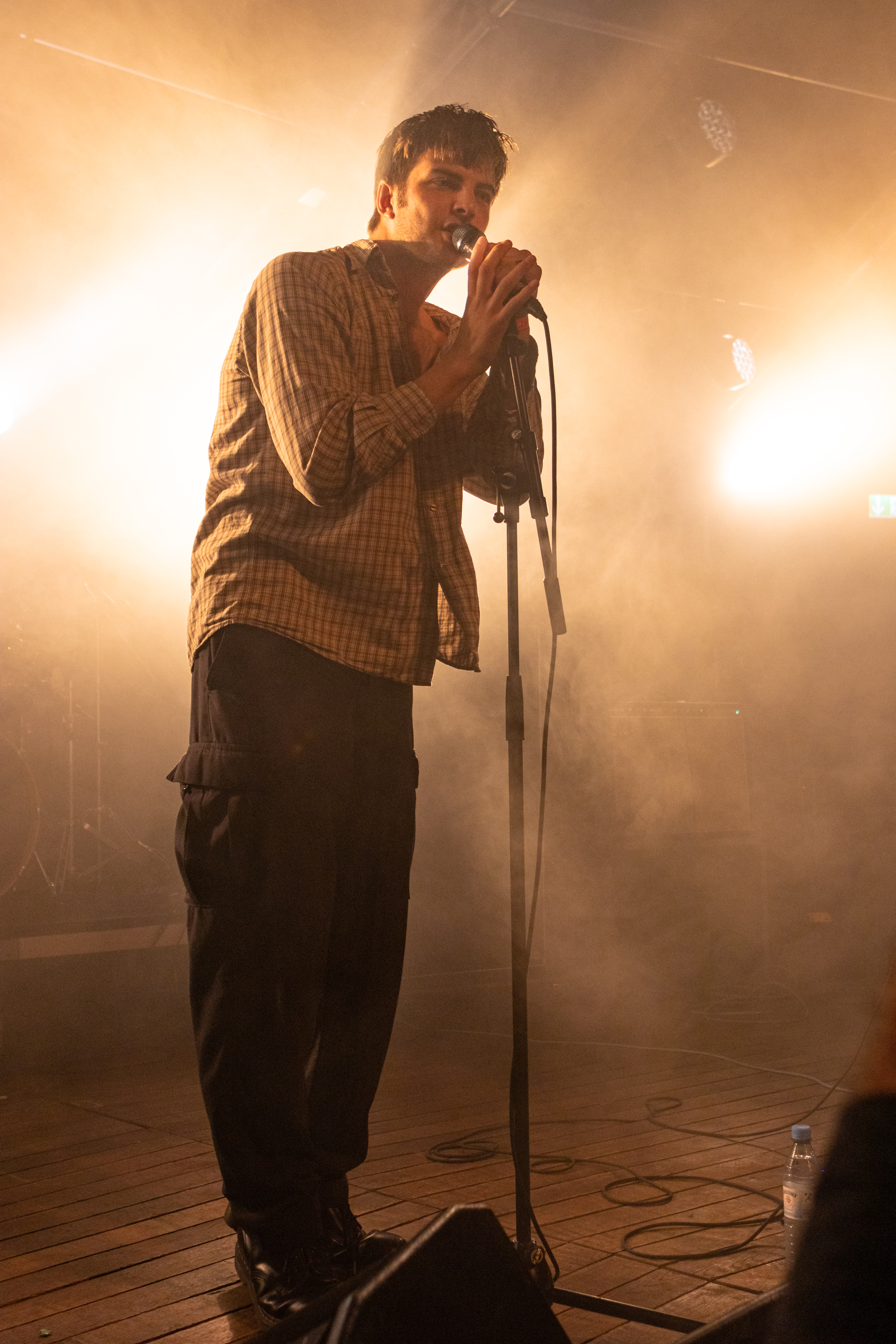
Inhaler and Fontaines D.C.

Inhaler was the first band announced as an opening act on the tour. They played both nights in Istanbul, and then shows at Burgas, Pula, and Prague in August 2022, while returning for select dates during the following spring leg of Europe. Inhaler found out they were supporting the band the same month it was announced. Of the opportunity, drummer Ryan McMahon said, "Every night, we just got to watch them be the greatest rock band in the world, they’re just so on it, and for a band that hadn’t toured in like three years, they really proved why they’re still at the top, and their new album is so fun to listen to. The fact we get to do it all again goes back to that imposter syndrome. We don’t feel worthy of it at all."

Interpol joined the band for three shows in South America, while Father John Misty, opened for them in Colombia. For their shows in Oceania they chose Australian bands Mildlife, in Melbourne and Brisbane, while, DMA's and The Buoys joined them in Sydney. The Hives and The Mysterines supported them during all their dates in England, with the former returning for select dates in the rest of the European Leg. The Hives had previously supported Arctic Monkeys for select dates in 2014 and 2019. Hives' frontman Pelle Almqvist said, "I’m really happy they wanted us back. It’s a really great tour to be on; it’s really fun. I think Arctic Monkeys are fucking amazing. They’re the only good really popular band – and that’s not easy to do." Willie J Healey also appeared in select dates for this leg.

Fontaines D.C. served as the opening act for the whole North American leg in 2023. Guitarist Carlos O'Connell told NME, "Arctic Monkeys are just so iconic obviously – they were so important when they came through, And I remember when we first heard Alex Turner was into the band, that felt like just insane." Also adding, "When we were younger these were things you’d never imagine". Lead singer Grian Chatten also commented, "Arctic Monkeys are playing better shows now than ever, Alex [Turner] completely owns his stage presence." For the dates in Mexico, the band was also joined by The Backseat Lovers. On their Ireland dates, Miles Kane was the opening act. As a solo artist Kane has opened for the band, on select dates, in 2011, 2012, 2013, and 2019. He has also opened for the band in 2005, 2006, and 2007 as a member of The Rascals and The Little Flames.

== Critical reception ==
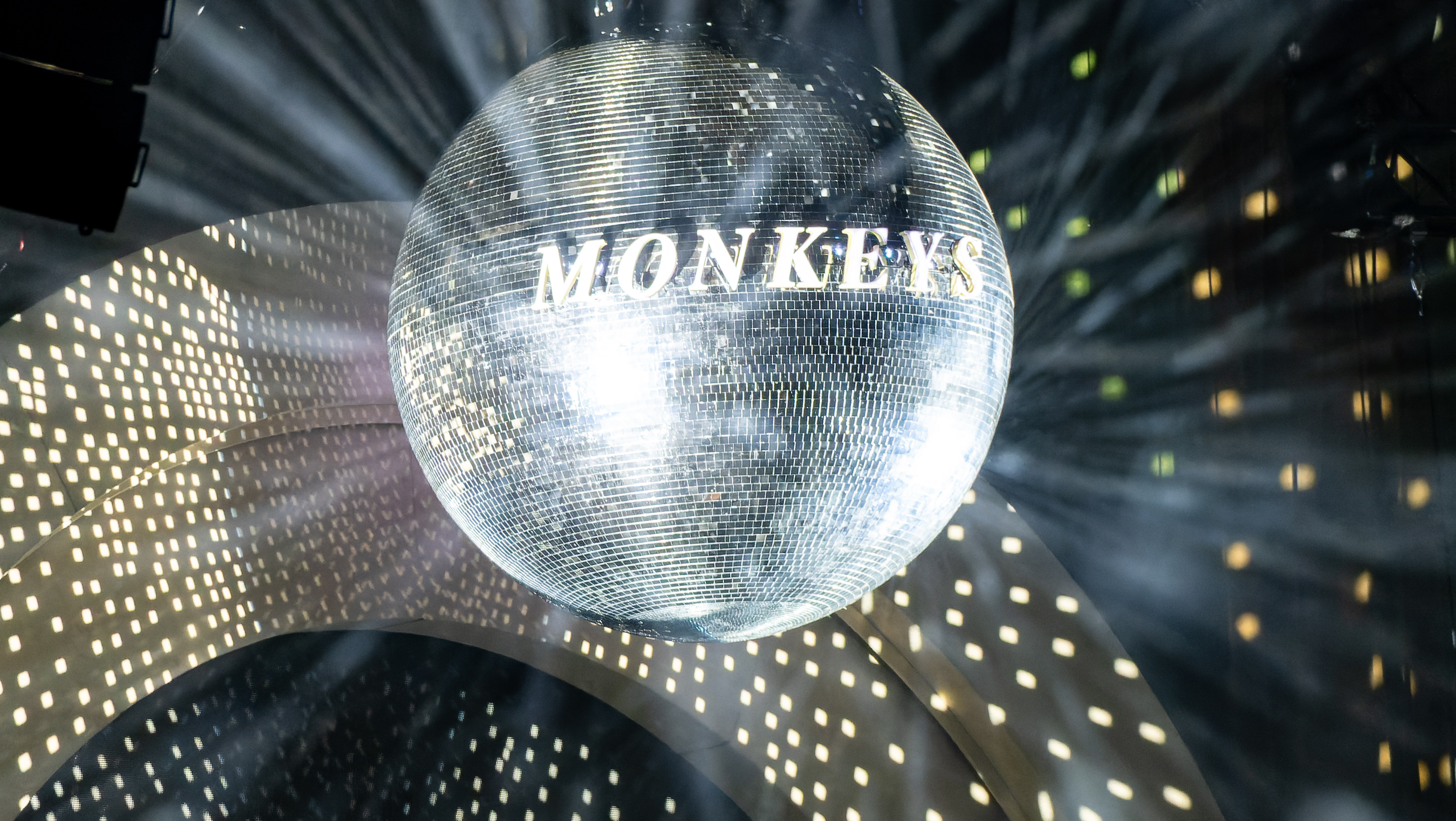
The mirrorball was part of the set designed by Turner for the stage

NME's Thomas Smith reviewed the band's set at Reading positively, saying, "This ain’t quite Nirvana in 1992, but still cements itself as one of the festival’s biggest and busiest sets in recent memory – a reminder of the band’s cross-generational reach." Smith praised the band's ability to blend their most commercial songs with the deep cuts, but noted a lack of crowd interaction. The show only featured two songs from Tranquility Base Hotel & Casino, which Smith described as "a masterpiece that doesn’t always translate at festival headline sets." Regardless, he thought the band "still happen to be the best in the game." Nacho Sánchez of El País thought their set at Cala Mijas was "solid" and noted the band's preference for AM on their setlist, Sánchez was also mindful of their mix of "teenage rock" and the slower 70's-infused sound of their latest albums. He though the maturity "looked great on the band", and that the crowd was very much enjoying the show. While reviewing one of their nights at Sidney Myer Music Bowl, Sian Cain of The Guardian said, "There are few frontmen touring today who lean into the theatrics of rockstardom as effortlessly as Alex Turner". She thought that songs from The Car seemed out of place with the rest of their setlist, adding, "they sound less like Arctic Monkeys, more like Alex Turner featuring Arctic Monkeys", she also lamented the decision to play the album without strings on stage, which she felt "strips back some of its seductive opulence". Cain was more forgiving of the overall performance, describing the band and its touring members as "polished", noting "when every note sounds so spot on, who truly cares?" and thought towards the end, Turner's warmth shone, as he reveled in the applause and blew kisses to the crowd. Their show at The Domain was named "one of the defining concerts of this Sydney summer." by Shamim Razavi of The Sydney Morning Herald, in that same review they were described as "two distinctly different bands: one the spiky, cheeky Northerner purveyors of rhythm-driven perfect post-pop punch; the other a mature, measured melodic act of perfect poise," united by "keen intelligence, both lyrically and musically, and the charismatic persona of frontman Alex Turner." Nevertheless, Razavi thought the union was not as "coherent" as choosing one style over the other.

On their first show of their UK stadium leg, Huw Baines, of The Guardian noted the simplicity of their staging "It is very simple – no pyro or stadium pomp here – but the lighting and video work creates a mood in a way that no confetti cannon could." He also praised the mix between their fast songs and their new, more relaxed tracks, highlighting the response to track Sculptures of Anything Goes, "It is rapturously received, suggesting that these new songs can be muscular stadium-fillers all on their own. Yes, very good."

== Recording ==
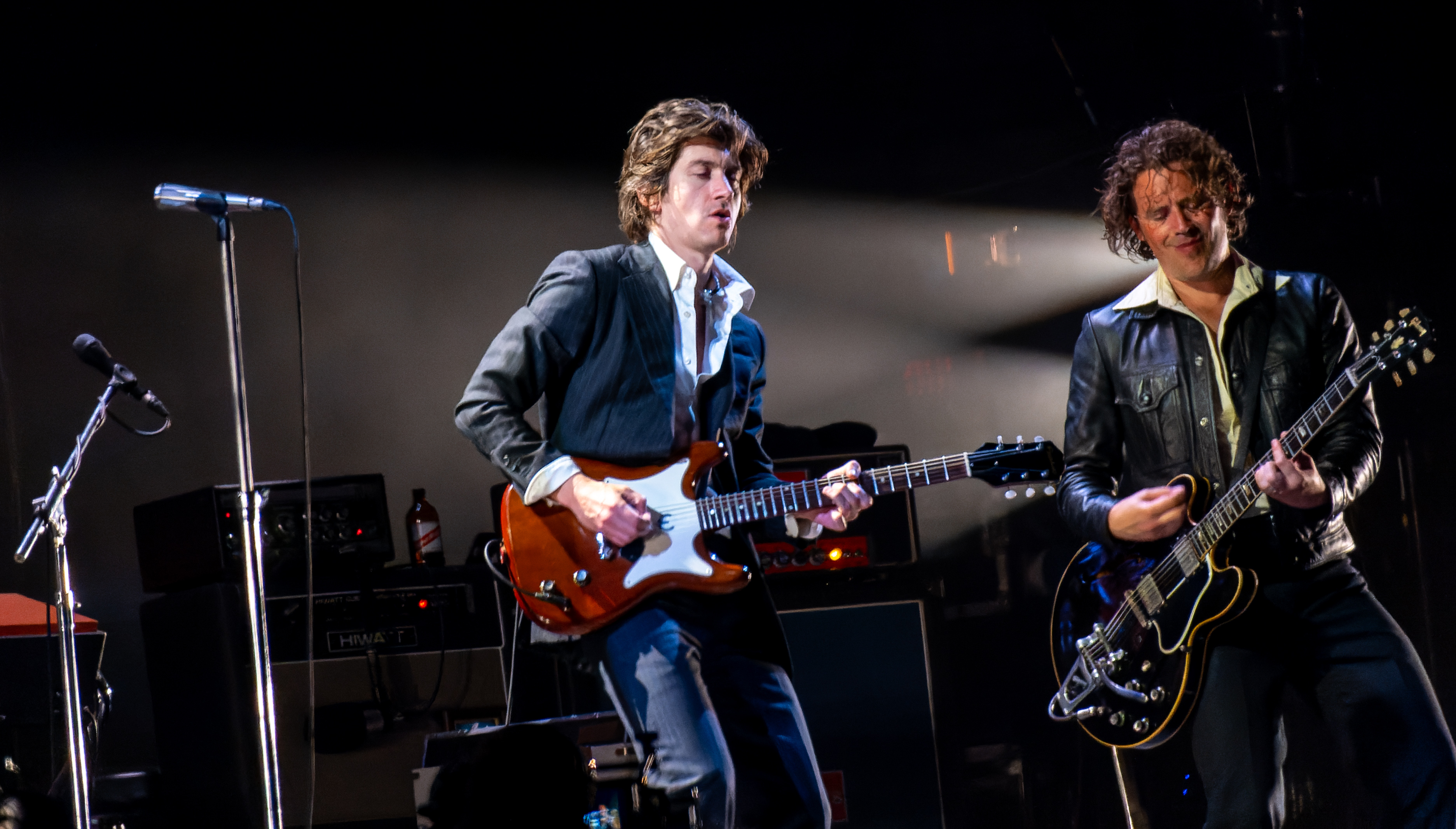
The band performing at Glastonbury.

The group released the concert film Arctic Monkeys at Kings Theatre on their YouTube channel in October 2022. The film was directed by Chappell and Zackery Michael, and features selected footage of the band, both backstage and performing, at their show on Brooklyn's Kings Theatre.

== Songs performed ==
Whatever People Say I Am, That's What I'm Not

- "The View from the Afternoon"
- "I Bet You Look Good on the Dancefloor"
- "From the Ritz to the Rubble"
- "Mardy Bum"
- "A Certain Romance" (Note: Played once at the concert on 9 June 2023 at Hillsborough Park in Sheffield)

Favourite Worst Nightmare

- "Brianstorm"
- "Teddy Picker"
- "Fluorescent Adolescent"
- "Do Me a Favour"
- "505"

Humbug

- "Crying Lightning"
- "Potion Approaching"
- "Cornerstone"
- "Pretty Visitors"
- "My Propeller"

Suck It and See

- "Don't Sit Down 'Cause I've Moved Your Chair"
- "Library Pictures"
- "Suck It and See"
- "That's Where You're Wrong"

AM

- "Do I Wanna Know?"
- "R U Mine?"
- "One for the Road"
- "Arabella"
- "No.1 Party Anthem"
- "Fireside"
- "Why'd You Only Call Me When You're High?"
- "Snap Out of It"
- "Knee Socks"
- "I Wanna Be Yours"

Tranquility Base Hotel & Casino

- "Star Treatment"
- "One Point Perspective"
- "Tranquility Base Hotel & Casino"
- "Four Out of Five"
- "The Ultracheese"

The Car

- "There'd Better Be a Mirrorball"
- "I Ain't Quite Where I Think I Am"
- "Sculptures of Anything Goes"
- "Body Paint"
- "The Car"
- "Big Ideas"
- "Hello You"
- "Mr Schwartz"
- "Perfect Sense"

== Tour dates ==
List of concerts, showing date, city, country, venue, opening acts, tickets sold, number of available tickets and amount of gross revenue
Date	City	Country	Venue	Opening acts	Attendance	Revenue
Leg 1 – Europe 2022
9 August 2022	Istanbul	Turkey	Zorlu PSM	Inhaler	—	—
10 August 2022	Istanbul	Turkey	Zorlu PSM	Inhaler	—	—
12 August 2022	Burgas	Bulgaria	Port of Burgas	Inhaler	—	—
13 August 2022 (Note: The concert on 13 August 2022 at Stirbey Domeniul in Buftea was part of Summer Well Festival)	Buftea	Romania	Stirbey Domeniul	—N/a	—N/a	—N/a
15 August 2022 (Note: The concert on 15 August 2022 at Hajógyári Island in Budapest was part of Sziget Festival)	Budapest	Hungary	Hajógyári Island	—N/a	—N/a	—N/a
16 August 2022	Pula	Croatia	Pula Arena	Inhaler	—	—
18 August 2022	Prague	Czech Republic	Výstaviště Praha	Inhaler	—	—
20 August 2022 (Note: The concert on 20 August 2022 at Walibi Holland in Biddinghuizen was part of Lowlands Festival)	Biddinghuizen	Netherlands	Walibi Holland	—N/a	—N/a	—N/a
21 August 2022 (Note: The concert on 21 August 2022 at Domein Kiewit in Hasselt was part of Pukkelpop)	Hasselt	Belgium	Domein Kiewit	—N/a	—N/a	—N/a
23 August 2022 (Note: The concert on 23 August 2022 at Glattbrugg in Zurich was part of Zurich Openair)	Zürich	Switzerland	Glattbrugg	—N/a	—N/a	—N/a
25 August 2022 (Note: The concert on 25 August 2022 at Domaine National de St. Cloud in Paris was part of Rock en Seine)	Paris	France	Domaine National de St. Cloud	—N/a	—N/a	—N/a
27 August 2022 (Note: The concert on 27 August 2022 at Richfield Avenue in Reading was part of Reading Festival)	Reading	England	Richfield Avenue	—N/a	—N/a	—N/a
28 August 2022 (Note: The concert on 27 August 2022 at Bramham Park in Leeds was part of Leeds Festival)	Leeds	England	Bramham Park	—N/a	—N/a	—N/a
1 September 2022 (Note: The concert on 1 September 2022 at La Cala de Mijas in Málaga was part of Cala Mijas Festival)	Málaga	Spain	La Cala de Mijas	—N/a	—N/a	—N/a
2 September 2022 (Note: The concert on 2 September 2022 at Bela Vista Park in Lisbon was part of MEO Kalorama Festival)	Lisbon	Portugal	Bela Vista Park	—N/a	—N/a	—N/a
4 September 2022 (Note: The concert on 4 September 2022 at Stradbally Hall in Stradbally was part of Electric Picnic)	Stradbally	Ireland	Stradbally Hall	—N/a	—N/a	—N/a
Leg 2 – USA
16 September 2022 (Note: The concert on 16 September 2022 at Fremont Street in Las Vegas was part of Life Is Beautiful Music & Art Festival)	Las Vegas	United States	Fremont Street	—N/a	—N/a	—N/a
18 September 2022 (Note: The concert on 18 September 2022 at Los Angeles State Historic Park in Los Angeles was part of Primavera Sound Los Angeles)	Los Angeles	United States	Los Angeles State Historic Park	—N/a	—N/a	—N/a
22 September 2022	New York City	United States	Kings Theatre	—	—	—
Leg 3 – Latin America
4 November 2022	Rio de Janeiro	Brazil	Jeunesse Arena	Interpol	—	—
5 November 2022 (Note: The concert on 4 November 2022 at Distrito Anhembi in São Paulo was part of Primavera Sound São Paulo)	São Paulo	Brazil	Anhembi Convention Center	—N/a	—N/a	—N/a
8 November 2022	Curitiba	Brazil	Pedreira Paulo Leminski	Interpol	—	—
10 November 2022 (Note: The concert on 10 November 2022 at Jockey Club in Asunción was part of Kilkfest)	Asunción	Paraguay	Jockey Club	—N/a	—N/a	—N/a
12 November 2022 (Note: The concert on 12 November 2022 at Parque Bicentenario de Cerrillos in Santiago was part of Primavera Sound Santiago de Chile)	Santiago	Chile	Parque Bicentenario de Cerrillos	—N/a	—N/a	—N/a
13 November 2022 (Note: The concert on 13 November 2022 at Costanera Sur in Buenos Aires was part of Primavera Sound Buenos Aires)	Buenos Aires	Argentina	Costanera Sur	—N/a	—N/a	—N/a
15 November 2022	Lima	Peru	Arena 1	Interpol	20,660 / 20,660	$1,278,433
17 November 2022	Bogotá	Colombia	Coliseo Live	Father John Misty	—	—
19 November 2022 (Note: The concert on 19 November 2022 at Autódromo Hermanos Rodríguez in Mexico City was part of Corona Capital)	Mexico City	Mexico	Autódromo Hermanos Rodríguez	—N/a	—N/a	—N/a
Leg 4 – Australia
29 December 2022 (Note: The concert on 29 December 2022 at the Festival Site in Glenworth Valley was part of Lost Paradise Festival)	Glenworth Valley	Australia	Festival Site	—N/a	—N/a	—N/a
31 December 2022 (Note: The concert on 31 December 2022 at Sidney Myer Music Bowl in Melbourne was part of Falls Festival Victoria)	Melbourne	Australia	Sidney Myer Music Bowl	—N/a	—N/a	—N/a
2 January 2023 (Note: The concert on 2 January 2023 at North Byron Parklands in Byron Bay was part of Falls Festival New South Wales)	Byron Bay	Australia	North Byron Parklands	—N/a	—N/a	—N/a
4 January 2023	Melbourne	Australia	Sidney Myer Music Bowl	Mildlife	—	—
5 January 2023	Melbourne	Australia	Sidney Myer Music Bowl	Mildlife	—	—
6 January 2023 (Note: The concert on 6 January 2023 at Adelaide Showground in Adelaide was part of Heaps Good Festival)	Adelaide	Australia	Adelaide Showground	—N/a	—N/a	—N/a
8 January 2023 (Note: The concert on 7 January 2023 at Fremantle Park in Fremantle was part of Falls Festival Fremantle)	Perth	Australia	Fremantle Park	—N/a	—N/a	—N/a
11 January 2023	Brisbane	Australia	Riverstage	Mildlife	—	—
14 January 2023	Sydney	Australia	The Domain	DMA's and The Buoys	—	—
Leg 5 – Asia
28 February 2023	Singapore		Singapore Indoor Stadium	—	15,000 / 15,000	—
3 March 2023 (Note: The concert on 3 March 2023 at Central Harbourfront in Hong Kong was part of Clockenflap)	Hong Kong	China	Central Harbourfront	—N/a	—N/a	—N/a
6 March 2023	Manila	Philippines	Filinvest City Events Grounds	—N/a	—	—
9 March 2023	Bangkok	Thailand	BITEC	—	—	—
12 March 2023	Tokyo	Japan	Tokyo Garden Theater	—	—	—
13 March 2023	Tokyo	Japan	Zepp Haneda	—	—	—
15 March 2023	Osaka	Japan	Zepp Osaka Bayside	—	—	—
18 March 2023	Jakarta	Indonesia	Beach City International Stadium	—	—	—
Leg 6 – Europe 2023
24 April 2023	Linz	Austria	TipsArena	Inhaler	—	—
25 April 2023	Munich	Germany	Zenith	Inhaler	—	—
27 April 2023	Hamburg	Germany	Alsterdorfer Sporthalle	Inhaler	—	—
29 April 2023	Stockholm	Sweden	Avicii Arena	Inhaler	—	—
30 April 2023	Oslo	Norway	Oslo Spektrum	Inhaler	—	—
2 May 2023	Berlin	Germany	Mercedes-Benz Arena	Inhaler	—	—
3 May 2023	Oberhausen	Germany	Rudolf Weber-Arena	Inhaler	—	—
5 May 2023	Amsterdam	Netherlands	Ziggo Dome	Inhaler	—	—
6 May 2023	Amsterdam	Netherlands	Ziggo Dome	Inhaler	—	—
8 May 2023	Frankfurt	Germany	Festhalle Frankfurt	Inhaler	—	—
9 May 2023	Paris	France	Accor Arena	Inhaler	—	—
10 May 2023	Paris	France	Accor Arena	Inhaler	—	—
29 May 2023	Bristol	England	Ashton Gate Stadium	The Hives; The Mysterines	30,000 / 34,000	—
31 May 2023	Coventry	England	Coventry Building Society Arena	The Hives; The Mysterines	37,500 / 40,000	—
2 June 2023	Manchester	England	Old Trafford Cricket Ground	The Hives; The Mysterines	—	—
3 June 2023	Manchester	England	Old Trafford Cricket Ground	The Hives; The Mysterines	—	—
5 June 2023	Middlesbrough	England	Riverside Stadium	The Hives; The Mysterines	30,000 / 34,742	—
7 June 2023	Norwich	England	Carrow Road	The Hives; The Mysterines	—	—
9 June 2023	Sheffield	England	Hillsborough Park	The Hives; The Mysterines	—	—
10 June 2023	Sheffield	England	Hillsborough Park	The Hives; The Mysterines	—	—
12 June 2023	Swansea	Wales	Swansea.com Stadium	The Hives; The Mysterines	20,000 / 21,088	—
14 June 2023	Southampton	England	Ageas Bowl	The Hives; The Mysterines	45,000	—
16 June 2023	London	England	Emirates Stadium	The Hives; The Mysterines	—	—
17 June 2023	London	England	Emirates Stadium	The Hives; The Mysterines	—	—
18 June 2023	London	England	Emirates Stadium	The Hives; The Mysterines	—	—
23 June 2023 (Note: The concert on 23 June 2023 at Worthy Farm in Pilton was part of Glastonbury Festival)	Pilton	England	Worthy Farm	—N/a	—N/a	—N/a
25 June 2023	Glasgow	Scotland	Bellahouston Park	The Hives; The Mysterines	—	—
30 June 2023 (Note: The concert on 30 June 2023 in Gdynia was part of Open'er Festival)	Gdynia	Poland	North Coast	—N/a	—N/a	—N/a
2 July 2023 (Note: The concert on 2 July 2023 in Werchter was part of Rock Werchter)	Werchter	Belgium	Werchter Festivalpark	—N/a	—N/a	—N/a
4 July 2023 (Note: The concert on 4 July 2023 in Luxembourg was part of the Luxexpo Open Air series of concerts.)	Luxembourg	Luxembourg	Luxexpo The Box	Willie J Healey	—	—
5 July 2023 (Note: The concert on 6 July 2023 in Aix Les Bains was part of Musilac)	Aix-les-Bains	France	Lac du Bourget Esplanade	—N/a	—N/a	—N/a
7 July 2023 (Note: The concert on 7 July 2023 at Passeio Marítimo de Alges in Lisbon was part of NOS Alive)	Lisbon	Portugal	Passeio Marítimo de Alges	—N/a	—N/a	—N/a
8 July 2023 (Note: The concert on 6 July 2023 at Kobetamendi in Bilbao was part of Bilbao BBK Live)	Bilbao	Spain	Kobetamendi	—N/a	—N/a	—N/a
10 July 2023	Madrid	Spain	WiZink Center	Willie J Healey	—	—
11 July 2023	Madrid	Spain	WiZink Center	Willie J Healey	—	—
13 July 2023 (Note: The concert on 13 July 2023 in Nîmes was part of Festival de Nîmes)	Nîmes	France	Festival de Nîmes	Willie J Healey	—N/a	—N/a
15 July 2023 (Note: The concert on 15 July 2023 in Milan was part of I-Days Milano 2023)	Milan	Italy	Ippodromo SNAI La Maura	The Hives	—N/a	—N/a
16 July 2023 (Note: The concert on 16 July 2023 in Rome was part of Rock in Roma)	Rome	Italy	Capannelle Racecourse	The Hives	—N/a	—N/a
18 July 2023 (Note: The concert on 19 July 2023 in Athens was part of Release Athens Festival)	Athens	Greece	Plateia Nerou	The Hives; Willie J Healey	—	—
19 July 2023	Athens	Greece	Plateia Nerou	The Hives; Willie J Healey	—	—
Leg 7 – North America
25 August 2023	Minneapolis	United States	Minneapolis Armory	Fontaines D.C.	—	—
26 August 2023	Minneapolis	United States	Minneapolis Armory	Fontaines D.C.	—	—
27 August 2023	Chicago	United States	United Center	Fontaines D.C.	—	—
29 August 2023	Clarkston	United States	Pine Knob Music Theatre	Fontaines D.C.	—	—
30 August 2023	Toronto	Canada	Budweiser Stage	Fontaines D.C.	—	—
1 September 2023	Toronto	Canada	Budweiser Stage	Fontaines D.C.	—	—
2 September 2023	Montreal	Canada	Bell Centre	Fontaines D.C.	—	—
3 September 2023	Boston	United States	TD Garden	Fontaines D.C.	—	—
5 September 2023	Philadelphia	United States	TD Pavilion at the Mann	Fontaines D.C.	—	—
7 September 2023	Columbia	United States	Merriweather Post Pavilion	Fontaines D.C.	—	—
8 September 2023	New York City	United States	Forest Hills Stadium	Fontaines D.C.	—	—
9 September 2023	New York City	United States	Forest Hills Stadium	Fontaines D.C.	—	—
11 September 2023	Alpharetta	United States	Ameris Bank Amphitheatre	Fontaines D.C.	—	—
12 September 2023	Nashville	United States	Ascend Amphitheater	Fontaines D.C.	—	—
13 September 2023	Nashville	United States	Ascend Amphitheater	Fontaines D.C.	—	—
15 September 2023	Austin	United States	Moody Center	Fontaines D.C.	—	—
16 September 2023	Fort Worth	United States	Dickies Arena	Fontaines D.C.	—	—
18 September 2023	Morrison	United States	Red Rocks Amphitheatre	Fontaines D.C.	—	—
19 September 2023	Morrison	United States	Red Rocks Amphitheatre	Fontaines D.C.	—	—
20 September 2023	Salt Lake City	United States	Delta Center	Fontaines D.C.	—	—
22 September 2023	Seattle	United States	Climate Pledge Arena	Fontaines D.C.	—	—
23 September 2023	Vancouver	Canada	Pacific Coliseum	Fontaines D.C.	—	—
24 September 2023	Portland	United States	Moda Center	Fontaines D.C.	—	—
26 September 2023	San Francisco	United States	Chase Center	Fontaines D.C.	—	—
27 September 2023	Sacramento	United States	Golden 1 Center	Fontaines D.C.	—	—
29 September 2023	Inglewood	United States	Kia Forum	Fontaines D.C.	—	—
30 September 2023	Inglewood	United States	Kia Forum	Fontaines D.C.	—	—
1 October 2023	Inglewood	United States	Kia Forum	Fontaines D.C.	—	—
6 October 2023	Mexico City	Mexico	Foro Sol	Fontaines D.C. The Backseat Lovers	–	—
7 October 2023	Mexico City	Mexico	Foro Sol	Fontaines D.C. The Backseat Lovers	–	—
Leg 8 – Ireland
15 October 2023	Dublin	Ireland	3Arena	Miles Kane	—	—
16 October 2023	Belfast	Northern Ireland	The SSE Arena	Miles Kane	—	—
17 October 2023	Dublin	Ireland	3Arena	Miles Kane	—	—
19 October 2023	Dublin	Ireland	3Arena	Miles Kane	—	—
Total

=== Cancelled dates ===
List of cancelled concerts showing date, city, country, venue, and reason for cancellation
Date	City	Country	Venue	Reason
20 June 2023 (Note: The concert venue was changed from Marlay Park to Malahide Castle, and then to Marlay Park again)	Dublin	Ireland	Marlay Park	Alex Turner suffering from acute laryngitis.

== Personnel ==
Arctic Monkeys

- Alex Turner – lead vocals, electric guitar, acoustic guitar, piano, 12-string guitar
- Jamie Cook – electric guitar, acoustic guitar, organ
- Nick O'Malley – bass guitar, backing vocals
- Matt Helders – drums, percussion, backing vocals

Touring members

- Scott Gillies – acoustic guitar, electric guitar, keyboards
- Tom Rowley – electric guitar, baritone guitar, lap steel guitar, keyboards, backing vocals
- Davey Latter – percussion
- Tyler Parkford – keyboards, backing vocals

Guests

- Miles Kane – guitar on "505"
- James Ford – keyboards at Glastonbury 2023 & Ireland Dates
