= No. 1 Party Anthem =

2013 song by Arctic Monkeys

Song by Arctic Monkeys

from the album AM
- Released: 9 September 2013
- Genre: Ballad; rock
- Length: 4:03
- Label: Domino
- Composer: Arctic Monkeys
- Lyricist: Alex Turner
- Producer: James Ford

"No. 1 Party Anthem" is a song by English rock band Arctic Monkeys, with lyrics written by frontman Alex Turner. It was released on 9 September 2013 by Domino Recording Company as the sixth track from their fifth studio album, AM (2013). The song resurged and began to go viral in late 2024, peaking at number 177 on the Billboard Global 200 chart.

== Composition ==
"No. 1 Party Anthem" is described as ballad song, with influences from hip-hop and soul. Jon Young of Spin cited the bands' 2012 Olympics cover of The Beatles' "Come Together" as a possible inspiration. Matt Wilkinson of NME stated that the song has a "James Bond style cabaret mentality – piano-led, glitzy but with totally cool, sharp lyrics" while comparing it to "Nobody Knows You When You're Down and Out" by John Lennon.

== Critical reception ==
The song mainly received positive reviews. Adam Silverstein of Digital Spy wrote that the song "has a Lennon-type grandeur to it not miles from Humbug's Cornerstone." A similar comparison was also made by Simon Harper of Clash. Jon Hadusek of Consequence of Sound described the song as "a massive Britpop ballad that Turner dominates," also commenting that it is Alex Turner's strongest performance on the album. J.C. Macek of PopMatters also described the song as "a slow, blues rock track with beautiful arpeggio breaks and an emotional, ballad-like construction that, again, describes a woman he’s missing." He also compared the song to Faith No More's cover of "Easy" by Commodores. Ryan Dombal of Pitchfork compared the track to works by Elton John and Rod Stewart while describing it as a seedier take on the band's breakout track "I Bet You Look Good on the Dancefloor." Larry Bartleet of NME has described the song as "The gooey centre of 'AM' will get the lighters (or phone torches) in the air. Romantic, yeah, but also a little bit cheeky".

Conversely, Brendan Frank of Beats Per Minute criticised the song, writing that "No. 1 Party Anthem" is the only song that really falls off the wagon, smelling just a little too much like leftovers from Suck It And See," while Paula Mejia of The A.V. Club stated that the song "resonates like a tear-soaked 2 a.m. karaoke hit."

== Personnel ==
Arctic Monkeys

- Alex Turner
- Jamie Cook
- Nick O'Malley
- Matt Helders

Additional personnel

- James Ford – production, keyboards
- Ross Orton – co-production
- Ian Shea – engineering
- Tchad Blake – mixing
- Brian Lucey – mastering

== Charts ==
=== Weekly charts ===
2013 weekly chart performance for "I Wanna Be Yours"
Chart (2013)	Peak position
UK Streaming (OCC)	29
UK Indie (Official Charts)	42

2025 weekly chart performance for "No. 1 Party Anthem"
Chart (2025)	Peak position
Global 200 (Billboard)	177
Philippines Hot 100 (Billboard Philippines)	39
UK Indie (Official Charts)	18
US Hot Rock & Alternative Songs (Billboard)	16

== Certifications ==
Certifications for "No. 1 Party Anthem"
Region	Certification	Certified units/sales
Canada (Music Canada)	Platinum	80,000^{‡}
United Kingdom (BPI)	Platinum	600,000^{‡}
United States (RIAA)	Platinum	1,000,000^{‡}
^{‡} Sales+streaming figures based on certification alone.
