= Helders =

Helders is a surname. Notable people with the surname include:

- Gerard Helders (1905–2013), Dutch politician
- Matt Helders (born 1986), British drummer, vocalist and songwriter
