= Brick by Brick (song) =

2011 song by Arctic Monkeys

Song by Arctic Monkeys

from the album Suck It and See
- Published: EMI Music
- Released: 4 March 2011 (video); 6 June 2011 (album)
- Recorded: 7 February 2011
- Studio: Sound City, Los Angeles
- Genre: Garage rock; psychedelic rock
- Length: 2:58
- Label: Domino
- Composers: Jamie Cook; Matt Helders; Nick O'Malley; Alex Turner
- Lyricist: Alex Turner
- Producer: James Ford

Music video
- "Brick by Brick" on YouTube

"Brick by Brick" is a song by Arctic Monkeys from the band's fourth album Suck It and See. The song was the first track to be revealed from the album, on 4 March 2011, and was designed as a teaser for the album rather than a lead single. The lead single was instead "Don't Sit Down 'Cause I've Moved Your Chair" which was released digitally on 12 April. A limited-edition white-label seven-inch vinyl version of "Don't Sit Down 'Cause I've Moved Your Chair" released on 16 April featured "Brick by Brick" as its B-side.

== Writing and production ==
Alex Turner explained the story of the song to NME:

We were in Miami on tour once and we just got off a long flight to there and we had an idea for a song called 'Brick by Brick' and so we wrote it that night just sorta in a bar. But it was quite loose, we thought about it as the concept of a song and all these things that you want to do– brick by brick– and we just made a list of them that was probably three times as long as what it ended up over that night and the next few weeks.

The song is intentionally brief and humorous, with Turner claiming that it was meant to include fewer than 30 words, "since we always do songs with a thousand words", an approach borrowed from Iggy Pop. "Even though it is dumbed down, we know it, and it's got a sense of humor … (t)here have always been jokes all over our songs; I originally started writing lyrics to make my friends crack a smile, which is difficult." "Brick By Brick" was the first track done for the album, with a demo being recorded by Turner and drummer Matt Helders after touring ended in 2010.

== Style ==
The song's vocals were compared to the work of Nick Cave in bands like Bad Seeds and Grinderman.

== Music video ==
Despite not being a single, the song still has a music video. The video features a girl taking a 10-inch Arctic Monkeys gramophone record out of its sleeve and playing it on her gramophone whilst smoking a cigarette. About halfway through the song, the scene switches to a car driving through California at sunset and footage of the band on a beach. As the song reaches its final chorus, the scene changes again to footage of the band recording the song at Sunset Sound Recorders in Hollywood. As the song reaches its close, the video cuts back to the girl listening to the record and fades to black as she walks away. The print on the vinyl played in the video is of the Sheffield coat of arms.

== Personnel ==
- Matt Helders – lead and backing vocals, drums
- Alex Turner – guitar, lead and backing vocals
- Jamie Cook – guitar
- Nick O'Malley – bass guitar, backing vocals
