= One for the Road (song) =

Single by Arctic Monkeys

from the album AM
- B-side: "You're So Dark"
- Released: 9 December 2013
- Recorded: Sage & Sound Recording, Los Angeles, California; Rancho De La Luna, Joshua Tree, California, Sputnik Sound, Nashville, Tennessee
- Genre: Alternative rock; blues rock; R&B
- Length: 3:26
- Label: Domino
- Composers: Jamie Cook; Matt Helders; Nick O'Malley; Alex Turner
- Lyricist: Alex Turner
- Producer: James Ford

Arctic Monkeys singles chronology
"Why'd You Only Call Me When You're High?" (2013)	"One for the Road" (2013)	"Arabella" (2014)

Music video
- "One for the Road" on YouTube

"One for the Road" is a song by English band Arctic Monkeys from their fifth studio album, AM. It was released on 9 December 2013 as the fourth single from the album. The single is available in the 7" vinyl format, and as a digital download, and features a B-side titled "You're So Dark". On 6 December 2013, Arctic Monkeys released the B-side's official audio track onto YouTube.

== Music and composition ==
"One for the Road" is a rock song with R&B influences. Featuring backing vocals from rock musician and Humbug producer Josh Homme, the song also features influences from Homme's band, Queens of the Stone Age. The song starts with high-pitched "woo" sounds performed by drummer Matt Helders and continues with "a bluesy chunky riff" and "Americana-tinged rockabilly twang."

== Music video ==
A music video for the song, filmed in Mendota, Illinois, was released on 23 October 2013. It was shot in black-and-white, and directed by Focus Creeps, with whom the band previously worked on several videos in 2011 and 2012, including the NME Award-winning video for "R U Mine?". The video shows Arctic Monkeys guitarist Jamie Cook driving tractors in three-piece suits, the band striking poses in a cornfield, and a party featuring models and fireworks.

On the video, Aaron Brown of Focus Creeps said: "It's really just a remake of "R U Mine?", but on a hi-fi camera, but then they have these lo-fi cars, which are tractors."

== Track listing ==
All lyrics are written by Alex Turner; all music is composed by Arctic Monkeys

7", digital download
No.	Title	Length
1.	"One for the Road"	3:26
2.	"You're So Dark"	3:02

== Personnel ==
Arctic Monkeys

- Alex Turner
- Jamie Cook
- Nick O'Malley
- Matt Helders

Additional personnel

- James Ford – production, keyboards
- Josh Homme – backing vocals (track 1)
- Ross Orton – co-production
- Ian Shea – engineering
- Tchad Blake – mixing
- Brian Lucey – mastering

== Charts ==
Chart (2013)	Peak position
Belgium (Ultratip Bubbling Under Flanders)	76
UK Singles (Official Charts Company)	112
UK Indie (Official Charts)	14

== Certifications ==
Region	Certification	Certified units/sales
Canada (Music Canada)	Gold	40,000^{‡}
New Zealand (RMNZ)	Gold	15,000^{‡}
United Kingdom (BPI)	Platinum	600,000^{‡}
United States (RIAA)	Gold	500,000^{‡}
^{‡} Sales+streaming figures based on certification alone.

== Release history ==
Country	Date	Format(s)	Label
United Kingdom	9 December 2013	7" vinyl; digital download	Domino
United States	10 December 2013	7" vinyl; digital download	Domino
