= Snap Out of It =

2014 single by Arctic Monkeys

Single by Arctic Monkeys

from the album AM
- Released: 9 June 2014
- Recorded: 2012–13
- Genre: Pop rock; alternative rock
- Length: 3:13
- Label: Domino
- Composers: Jamie Cook; Matt Helders; Nick O'Malley; Alex Turner
- Lyricist: Alex Turner
- Producer: James Ford

Arctic Monkeys singles chronology
"Arabella" (2014)	"Snap Out of It" (2014)	"Four Out of Five" (2018)

Music video
- "Snap Out of It" on YouTube

"Snap Out of It" is a song by English indie rock band Arctic Monkeys from their fifth studio album, AM (2013). The song was released as the album's sixth overall single on 9 June 2014, impacting contemporary hit radio in the United Kingdom.

== Music video ==
The music video was directed by Focus Creeps and was released on 16 June 2014. In the video, a woman (Stephanie Sigman) sits on her couch, and watches footage of the band recording in the studio. She gets fixated on frontman Alex Turner and starts crying, dancing, and puts her face close to the television. Towards the end, she also appears in the recording, alluding to, that in the story, they were a couple and now they had broken up.

== Critical reception ==
In a 10/10 review of AM, Mike Williams of NME wrote that the song "swirls with such orchestral intensity that it wouldn’t feel out of place on a second Last Shadow Puppets album." Mic Wright of The Quietus commented that the song "has clicks, claps and the kind of catchy hooks that'll get you a job pumping out new songs for Icona Pop."

== Personnel ==
Arctic Monkeys

- Alex Turner
- Jamie Cook
- Nick O'Malley
- Matt Helders

Additional personnel

- James Ford – production, keyboards
- Ross Orton – co-production
- Ian Shea – engineering
- Tchad Blake – mixing
- Brian Lucey – mastering

== Charts ==
Chart (2014)	Peak position
Belgium (Ultratip Bubbling Under Flanders)	13
Belgium (Ultratip Bubbling Under Wallonia)	35
Canada Rock (Billboard)	19
CIS Airplay (TopHit)	188
Ireland (IRMA)	68
UK Singles (Official Charts Company)	82
UK Indie (Official Charts Company)	6
US Hot Rock & Alternative Songs (Billboard)	37

== Certifications ==
Region	Certification	Certified units/sales
Canada (Music Canada)	2× Platinum	160,000^{‡}
Denmark (IFPI Danmark)	Gold	45,000^{‡}
Italy (FIMI)	Gold	50,000^{‡}
New Zealand (RMNZ)	Platinum	30,000^{‡}
Spain (Promusicae) (since 2015)	Gold	30,000^{‡}
United Kingdom (BPI)	2× Platinum	1,200,000^{‡}
United States (RIAA)	Platinum	1,000,000^{‡}
Streaming
Greece (IFPI Greece)	Gold	1,000,000^{†}
^{‡} Sales+streaming figures based on certification alone.^{†} Streaming-only figures based on certification alone.

== Release history ==
Region	Date	Format	Label
United Kingdom	9 June 2014	Contemporary hit radio	Domino
