= Arabella (Arctic Monkeys song) =

Single by Arctic Monkeys

from the album AM
- Released: 28 January 2014
- Recorded: 2012–13
- Genre: Hard rock; glam metal; heavy metal
- Length: 3:27
- Label: Domino
- Composers: Jamie Cook; Matt Helders; Nick O'Malley; Alex Turner
- Lyricist: Alex Turner
- Producer: James Ford

Arctic Monkeys singles chronology
| "One for the Road" (2013) | "Arabella" (2014) | "Snap Out of It" (2014) |

Music video
- "Arabella" on YouTube

"Arabella" is a song by English rock band Arctic Monkeys from their fifth studio album, AM (2013). The song was confirmed as the album's fifth single by the band and their label Domino and impacted radio in Italy on 28 January 2014 and the United Kingdom on 10 March 2014. A physical 7" vinyl single was also planned for release on 28 March 2014, but was ultimately cancelled.

== Performances ==
"Arabella" was played live for the first time on 30 August 2013, during Zurich Openair festival performance, which was a part of the AM Tour. The band often play part of Black Sabbath's "War Pigs" during live performances of the song, done to give Alex Turner time to equip a guitar for the solo. The part "War Pigs" is played due to the similarities between the riffs of the two songs.

== Music video ==
An official music video for the song, directed by English director Jake Nava, premiered on 2 March 2014.

== Reception ==
"Arabella" is widely regarded as one of the band's best songs. In 2023, Rolling Stone and Paste ranked the song number ten and number four, respectively, on their lists of the greatest Arctic Monkeys songs.

== Commercial performance ==
In September 2013, following the release of AM, "Arabella" charted at number 155 on the UK Singles Chart, number 26 on the UK Indie Chart, and number 7 on the Ultratip chart of Belgium's Flanders region. Following the announcement of its single release in March 2014, the single re-entered the UK Singles and Indie charts, peaking at numbers 70 and 9 respectively. "Arabella" was added to the BBC Radio 1 playlist on the B-list on 10 February 2014.

== Personnel ==
Arctic Monkeys

- Alex Turner
- Jamie Cook
- Nick O'Malley
- Matt Helders

Technical personnel

- James Ford – production
- Ross Orton – co-production
- Ian Shea – engineering
- Tchad Blake – mixing
- Brian Lucey – mastering

== Charts ==
| Chart (2013) | Peak position |
|---|---|
| UK Singles (Official Charts Company) | 155 |
| Chart (2014) | Peak position |
| Mexico Ingles Airplay (Billboard) | 45 |
| UK Independent (Official Charts) | 9 |
| UK Singles (Official Charts Company) | 70 |
| US Hot Rock & Alternative Songs (Billboard) | 47 |

== Certifications ==
| Region | Certification | Certified units/sales |
|---|---|---|
| Canada (Music Canada) | 2× Platinum | 160,000^{‡} |
| Italy (FIMI) | Gold | 25,000^{‡} |
| New Zealand (RMNZ) | 2× Platinum | 60,000^{‡} |
| Spain (Promusicae) | Gold | 30,000^{‡} |
| United Kingdom (BPI) | 2× Platinum | 1,200,000^{‡} |
| United States (RIAA) | Platinum | 1,000,000^{‡} |
Streaming
| Greece (IFPI Greece) | Gold | 1,000,000^{†} |
^{‡} Sales+streaming figures based on certification alone.^{†} Streaming-only figures based on certification alone.

== Release history ==
| Region | Date | Format | Label |
|---|---|---|---|
| Italy | 28 January 2014 | Contemporary hit radio | Domino |
| United Kingdom | 10 March 2014 | Contemporary hit radio | Domino |
