= Do I Wanna Know? =

2013 single by Arctic Monkeys

Single by Arctic Monkeys

from the album AM
- B-side: "2013"
- Released: 19 June 2013
- Studio: Sage & Sound Recording (Los Angeles, California); Rancho De La Luna (Joshua Tree, California)
- Genre: Indie rock; psychedelic rock; stoner rock; blues rock; alternative rock
- Length: 4:33
- Label: Domino
- Composers: Alex Turner; Jamie Cook; Nick O'Malley; Matt Helders
- Lyricist: Alex Turner
- Producers: James Ford; Ross Orton

Arctic Monkeys singles chronology
"R U Mine?" (2012)	"Do I Wanna Know?" (2013)	"Why'd You Only Call Me When You're High?" (2013)

Music video
- "Do I Wanna Know?" on YouTube

"Do I Wanna Know?" is a song by English rock band Arctic Monkeys, with lyrics written by frontman Alex Turner. It was released on 19 June 2013 by Domino Recording Company as the second single from their fifth studio album, AM (2013). It received a digital download release through iTunes as well as an accompanying music video. Before its release as a single, the song was premiered by the band live in May 2013 on the AM Tour, where it was often played as the opening number. It is an indie rock, psychedelic rock, stoner rock, blues rock and alternative rock song, and is built around a stomping guitar riff.

"Do I Wanna Know?" peaked at number 11 in the UK Singles Chart, charted in several other countries and was the first Arctic Monkeys song to have ever entered the Billboard Hot 100 chart in the United States, peaking at number 70 in March 2014 and also serving as their "big breakthrough moment" in the US. The song was nominated for Best Rock Performance at the 57th Annual Grammy Awards in 2015. In December 2019, the song was ranked number three on Guitar World's list of the 20 best guitar riffs of the decade. The song has accumulated over 3 billion streams on Spotify, and ranks #62 in the 100 most-streamed songs in the streaming platform's history, while its music video has earned 1.8 billion views on YouTube.

== Composition ==
"Do I Wanna Know?" is performed in the key of G minor. Musically, it has been described as an indie rock, psychedelic rock, stoner rock, blues rock and alternative rock song. The song has a similar aesthetic style and lyrical content to their 2012 song "R U Mine?"; it is more downtempo while having similar guitar riffs. PopMatters describes it as "a cleaner, slower-burning 'R U Mine?'", while also finding its "stomping" style to be a "steadier take" on the music found on Humbug (2009). The song also contains the edgier sound found on their previous album Suck It and See (2011).

Structurally, the song follows a common pop music "verse-pre-chorus-chorus" form up until its second chorus; from that point on, it follows what Hit Songs Deconstructed calls "a more unorthodox flow" ending in a "pre-chorus/chorus hybrid section". Falsetto backing vocals are also blended with those of Turner's throughout the song. Moreover, the title encapsulates the entire premise of the story, the narrator wondering whether he wants to remain in doubt or know if his feelings are unrequited or mutual.

== Release and reception ==
"Do I Wanna Know?" was first played live on 22 May 2013 in Ventura, California at the first concert of the band's AM Tour. Throughout the tour, the song was being played as the opening number. It was then released as AM's second single on 19 June 2013, appearing in digital download formats through iTunes. It was accompanied by a music video released on YouTube. The single was released with no promotion, allowing fans to purchase it through iTunes immediately. A 7-inch vinyl edition of the single was released on 22 July 2013, with a B-side titled "2013". On AM, "Do I Wanna Know?" appears as the opening track.

Rolling Stone ranked "Do I Wanna Know?" as the tenth best song of 2013, calling it "the highlight of the U.K. crew's soul-rock overhaul album AM". The song was nominated for Best Rock Performance at the 57th Annual Grammy Awards in 2015, losing to "Lazaretto" by Jack White. In December 2019, the song was ranked number three on Guitar World's list of the 20 best guitar riffs of the decade. NME later ranked the song as the fifth best song of the 2010s decade. Music critic Steven Hyden said of the song "If "Seven Nation Army" is the most famous rock song of the last 20 years, then "Do I Wanna Know?" has to be the second most famous".

== Commercial performance ==
Despite a midweek on air on sale release, the song entered the UK Singles Chart at number 11, making it the band's highest-charting single since "Fluorescent Adolescent" in 2007. It was outperformed by the next single "Why'd You Only Call Me When You're High?", which debuted at number eight. "Do I Wanna Know?" has spent 65 weeks in the UK top 100, this being the longest run of any Arctic Monkeys single, to date. The single was awarded a platinum certification by the British Phonographic Industry (BPI) on 7 February 2015, indicating shipments in excess of 600,000 units; it is the first Arctic Monkeys single to do so. As of 2026, it is certified septuple-platinum in the UK.

The song had moderate success worldwide, charting in countries such as Australia, France, Belgium, Ireland and Israel. In January 2014, the song reached number one on the Billboard Alternative Songs chart, the group's first number one single in the United States and their first appearance on that chart since "I Bet You Look Good on the Dancefloor" peaked at number seven in 2006. On 28 March, the track became the 30th song to have occupied the Billboard Alternative Songs chart top spot for 10 weeks or more. As of the 25 October 2014 issue of Billboard, it logged 58 weeks on the Alternative Songs list, making it the second-longest running song on the chart at the time. It also became the band's first single to appear on the Billboard Hot 100 chart, peaking at number 70 in March 2014. On 26 January 2014, the song reached number four on Triple J's Hottest 100 of 2013, and, on 14 March 2020, reached number three on Triple J's Hottest 100 of 2010s.

In late 2023, for the 35th anniversary of Alternative Songs (which by then had been renamed to Alternative Airplay), Billboard ranked "Do I Wanna Know?" as the 18th-most successful song in the chart's history.

== Music video ==
The music video for "Do I Wanna Know?", directed by David Wilson with animation agency Blinkink, was first released onto YouTube on 18 June 2013. As of June 2020, it has been viewed over one billion times, becoming one of only 12 rock videos to achieve this feat. The video begins with a black background and simple visuals of white sound waves (similar to the AM cover art) that vibrate in synchronisation, first with the percussion and lead guitar, then with the lead singer, Alex Turner. As the band enters with the chorus, coloured sound waves illustrate new voices. Simple sound waves then give way to fast-moving, representational line-drawing animations that morph between a variety of female, race car, race car engine, and road racing images. At one point, the undulating white line becomes the "trucker's Mudflap girl", seen in the single's cover art. The line drawings are interrupted several times with flashes of full-color animation, several that recall the surrealistic style of Robert Crumb. The increasingly complex video creates, by turns, a somewhat jarring and psychedelic experience, in a style not unlike the Gary Gutierrez animations that were featured in The Grateful Dead Movie (1977). The video ends with the familiar white line becoming two crossed checkered flags, which join together in a single line with the "AM" initials.

== In popular culture ==
"Do I Wanna Know?" was used in a 2013 Bacardi commercial. In September 2014, the song was used in the pilot episode of ABC's TV series Forever, and the fifth episode of Israeli series Ish Hashuv Meod. An instrumental version of the song is used in the second season finale of the BBC series Peaky Blinders. The song was also present in Ubisoft's 2014 game, The Crew as one of the songs in the in-game radio.

The song has been covered by artists such as MS MR, Sam Smith, Chvrches, Hozier, Dove Cameron, Dua Lipa, and Christina Grimmie.

== Track listing ==
All lyrics are written by Alex Turner; all music is composed by Arctic Monkeys.

Download single
No.	Title	Length
1.	"Do I Wanna Know?"	4:33

7-inch single
No.	Title	Length
1.	"Do I Wanna Know?"	4:33
2.	"2013"	2:26

== Personnel ==
Taken from the CD single liner notes.

Arctic Monkeys

- Alex Turner
- Jamie Cook
- Nick O'Malley
- Matt Helders

Additional personnel

- James Ford – production; keys on "2013"
- Ross Orton – production
- Ian Shea – engineering
- Tchad Blake – mixing (at Full Mongrel Studios, Wales)
- Brian Lucey – mastering (at Magic Garden Mastering)

== Charts ==
=== Weekly charts ===
2013–2014 weekly chart performance
Chart (2013–2014)	Peak position
Australia (ARIA)	37
Belgium (Ultratop 50 Flanders)	33
Belgium (Ultratip Bubbling Under Wallonia)	33
Canada Hot 100 (Billboard)	48
Canada Rock (Billboard)	3
Czech Republic Singles Digital (ČNS IFPI)	75
France (SNEP)	45
Ireland (IRMA)	14
Israel International Airplay (Media Forest)	10
Italy (FIMI)	96
Netherlands (Single Top 100)	62
Scottish Singles Sales (Official Charts)	12
Slovakia Singles Digital (ČNS IFPI)	63
Switzerland (Schweizer Hitparade)	66
UK Singles (Official Charts)	11
UK Indie (Official Charts)	2
US Billboard Hot 100	70
US Adult Alternative Airplay (Billboard)	11
US Alternative Airplay (Billboard)	1
US Hot Rock & Alternative Songs (Billboard)	10
US Mainstream Rock Airplay (Billboard)	12
US Rock & Alternative Airplay (Billboard)	1

2016 weekly chart performance
Chart (2016)	Peak position
Portugal (AFP)	80

2021–2026 weekly chart performance
Chart (2021–2026)	Peak position
Global 200 (Billboard)	116
Greece International (IFPI)	15
Poland (Polish Streaming Top 100)	80
Sweden Heatseeker (Sverigetopplistan)	16

=== Year-end charts ===
2013 year-end chart performance
Chart (2013)	Position
UK Singles (Official Charts Company)	55
US Hot Rock Songs (Billboard)	52

2014 year-end chart performance
Chart (2014)	Position
US Adult Alternative Songs (Billboard)	41
US Alternative Songs (Billboard)	1
US Hot Rock Songs (Billboard)	20
US Mainstream Rock (Billboard)	46
US Rock Airplay (Billboard)	1

2018 year-end chart performance
Chart (2018)	Position
Portugal (AFP)	151

2021 year-end chart performance
Chart (2021)	Position
Portugal (AFP)	91

2022 year-end chart performance
Chart (2022)	Position
Global Excl. US (Billboard)	153
Lithuania (AGATA)	63
UK Singles (OCC)	86

2023 year-end chart performance
Chart (2023)	Position
Poland (Polish Streaming Top 100)	85
UK Singles (OCC)	72

2024 year-end chart performance
Chart (2024)	Position
Portugal (AFP)	175

=== Decade-end charts ===
2010s decade-end chart performance
Chart (2010–2019)	Position
UK Singles (Official Charts Company)	93

== Certifications ==
Sales certifications for "Do I Wanna Know?"
Region	Certification	Certified units/sales
Australia (ARIA)	Platinum	70,000^{^}
Belgium (BRMA)	Gold	20,000^{‡}
Canada (Music Canada)	Diamond	800,000^{‡}
Denmark (IFPI Danmark)	Platinum	90,000^{‡}
Germany (BVMI)	Gold	150,000^{‡}
Italy (FIMI)	2× Platinum	100,000^{‡}
Mexico (AMPROFON)	2× Platinum+Gold	150,000^{‡}
New Zealand (RMNZ)	7× Platinum	210,000^{‡}
Portugal (AFP)	6× Platinum	120,000^{‡}
Spain (Promusicae)	3× Platinum	180,000^{‡}
United Kingdom (BPI)	7× Platinum	4,200,000^{‡}
United States (RIAA)	9× Platinum	9,000,000^{‡}
Streaming
Greece (IFPI Greece)	4× Platinum	8,000,000^{†}
^{^} Shipments figures based on certification alone.^{‡} Sales+streaming figures based on certification alone.^{†} Streaming-only figures based on certification alone.

== Release history ==
Release history for "Do I Wanna Know?"
Region	Date	Format	Label	Ref.
United Kingdom	19 June 2013	Digital download	Domino	
United Kingdom	22 July 2013	7" vinyl	Domino	
United States	10 September 2013	Modern rock radio	Domino	
