= Why'd You Only Call Me When You're High? =

2013 single by Arctic Monkeys

Single by Arctic Monkeys

from the album AM
- B-side: "Stop the World I Wanna Get Off with You"
- Released: 11 August 2013
- Genre: Funk rock; blues rock; R&B
- Length: 2:41
- Label: Domino
- Composers: Jamie Cook; Matt Helders; Nick O'Malley; Alex Turner
- Lyricist: Alex Turner
- Producer: James Ford

Arctic Monkeys singles chronology
| "Do I Wanna Know?" (2013) | "Why'd You Only Call Me When You're High?" (2013) | "One for the Road" (2013) |

Music video
- "Why'd You Only Call Me When You're High?" on YouTube

"Why'd You Only Call Me When You're High?" is a song by English indie rock band Arctic Monkeys. It was released as the third single from their fifth studio album, AM, on 11 August 2013. It was written by the group's lead vocalist Alex Turner while its production was handled by James Ford. Upon its release, many critics compared the composition of "Why'd You Only Call Me When You're High?" with works by different artists.

On 30 August 2013, an audio track of the single's B-side, "Stop the World I Wanna Get Off with You", was released onto Arctic Monkeys' official YouTube channel. An accompanying music video was shot for the song by Nabil Elderkin and released in July 2013. The band has performed the song multiple times at different venues and also on their AM Tour.

== Background and composition ==
"Why'd You Only Call Me When You're High?"
A 20 second sample of "Why'd You Only Call Me When You're High?" by Arctic Monkeys, where the chorus is heard.

The song was leaked on 29 July 2013 on YouTube and social networking sites, but quickly taken down. It was released as a single on 11 August 2013, together with an accompanying music video.

"Why'd You Only Call Me When You're High?" is described as a R&B, funk rock and blues rock song. Carl Purvis of No Ripcord stated that the song "sounds like it's been ripped from a Jurassic 5 mixtape before Turner's exacerbated thirst to relieve his libido once again shines through." Robert Ham from Paste opined that the song outlines Turner's "desperation for a 3 a.m. booty call with the title coming as a rebuttal." Andy Baber of MusicOMH stated that the song contained "sultry, broken beats". He commented further that it "confirms the already lingering sense that AM is an album of the night." Benji Taylor of Pretty Much Amazing wrote that the band's use of "stuttering hip hop beats" on AM is most notable on "Why'd You Only Call Me When You're High?", while Jazz Monroe of Drowned in Sound recognized influences from Dr. Dre and Timbaland.

== Critical reception ==
Professional ratings
Review scores
| Source | Rating |
|---|---|
| Evening Times | 4/5 stars |
| Rolling Stone | 3/5 stars |

The song garnered acclaim from contemporary music critics. Mic Wright of The Quietus provided a positive review, writing the song has "enough swagger to make a young LL Cool J jealous." Caleb Caldwell of Slant Magazine reviewed the song positively, writing, "The heavy, molasses-slow rhythms, especially the late-night beats of "Why'd You Only Call Me When You're High," draw on Dr. Dre's brand of West Coast G-funk, as does Turner's use of broken rhymes and long, syllable-crammed lines, delivered in his characteristic sneer." Kevin Harley of The Independent on Sunday praised the "tight, limber rhythms cushioning the G-funk comedown of the song." Andy Gill from The Independent opined that the band "grind out a predatory, lurching funk-rock" in the song. Stephen Thomas Erlewine of AllMusic wrote that the song "simmers" and contains a "distinctly danceable rhythm." A critic from DIY wrote that "the after hours, creep on creepin’ on bassline" of the song is just one of the many moments where AM clicks.

== Commercial performance ==
On 18 August 2013, the song debuted at number eight on the UK Singles Chart, making it their first top 10 single since "Fluorescent Adolescent" in 2007. The single's B-side, "Stop the World I Wanna Get Off with You", independently reached number 74 on the UK Singles Chart on 8 September 2013. Their previous single "Do I Wanna Know?" was at number 21 at the time, meaning the band had two singles in the UK Top 40 in the same week. It also reached no. 1 in the UK Indie Chart. In Belgium, the song reached no. 31 in Flanders and no. 22 in Wallonia, respectively. It reached no. 42 on the Japan Hot 100, no. 96 on the Canadian Hot 100 and no. 164 on France's SNEP chart. It charted in the Top 40 of Irish Singles Chart, US Hot Rock Songs and US Mainstream Rock. It charted in the top 10 of Scotland's Official Chart, US Rock Airplay and US Alternative Songs. As of August 3, 2026, the song has accumulated over 2.32 billion streams on Spotify.

== Music video ==
A scene in the video shows Alex Turner drunk walking through the streets

A music video for "Why'd You Only Call Me When You're High?", directed by Nabil Elderkin, began filming in early July 2013 and was released on 10 August 2013. As of November 2023, it has over 170 million viewers on YouTube. The music video features Lamie Stewart as Stephanie.

The video shows Alex Turner, Jamie Cook, Nick O'Malley and Matt Helders in the 'Howl at the Moon' pub in East London, Hoxton Street, having a drink. The song "Do I Wanna Know?" can be heard in the background. Wasted, Alex sends multiple text messages to a girl called Stephanie to get a booty call, without any answer. When he leaves the pub, he walks through the city and hallucinates seeing Stephanie having sex with different men and riding naked on the back of a man's motorcycle. Eventually, he arrives at the wrong house, across the street from Stephanie's, and repeatedly knocks on the door while texting her "I'm outside". The camera shows the girl at her home picking up the phone and seeing 17 missed messages from "Alex band guy". She rolls her eyes in irritation and decides to ignore his texts.

The music video received a nomination for Best Rock Video at the 2015 MTV Video Music Awards.

== Live performances ==
The band has performed the song multiple times in several music festivals and also on various radio stations. They performed a stripped-down version of the song on BBC's Live Lounge. A critic from Spin magazine provided a positive review of the performance, writing, "The low-key version holds onto the original's falsetto pleas and strummy strut, but peppers the tune with careful xylophone plinks, lending the long-distance kiss-off a new kind of delicacy." On 22 February 2014, they performed the song on the Late Show with David Letterman. "Why'd You Only Call Me When You're High?" was also included in the setlist of their AM Tour.

== Miley Cyrus version ==
In January 2014, Miley Cyrus covered the song during the uncensored version of her MTV Unplugged special. Cyrus' version garnered critical acclaim. According to Stephanie Chase of Contactmusic.com, she "nailed it". Kimberley Dadds of BuzzFeed called the version "very, very good" and stated that "It's a nice reminder that she's actually quite good at singing." Merna Jibrail of AndPOP praised the performance, writing, "Miley brought some British flair to her MTV Unplugged session with her amazing cover of the Arctic Monkeys’ hit." Tom Breihan of Stereogum praised Cyrus' vocal delivery, writing, "Cyrus’s cover stands tall. She’s got enough swagger and iciness to sell the song, she’s got the technical chops to hit a couple of big notes toward the end, and she sings like she’s knows what she’s singing about." Shannon Carlin provided a positive review, writing, "Cyrus creeps into a deep, southern twang to tell the tale of a rather long night and keeps things a little seedy with her country drawl." Ben Kaye of Consequence of Sound praised Cyrus' vocals, writing, "Cyrus reached way up high for some powerful ending notes." Amy Sciarretto of PopCrush provided a positive review, writing, "She hits some power notes in the last few seconds of the song, where she lets it rip." Rae Alexandra from SF Weekly praised the performance, writing, "She took the laid-back swagger of the original, gave it a sultry, stompy slant, and injected the end of the track with a refreshing kick of passion." Charlie Gowans-Eglinton of Elle called the cover "brilliant". Writing for Time, Sam Lansky praised Cyrus' "raspy, tangy vocals and energetic showmanship."

During an interview, Matt Helders, the drummer of Arctic Monkeys, revealed his love for Cyrus' version of the track. Quizzed on his favorite cover version of one of the band's songs, the drummer said: "I think Miley Cyrus' version of 'Why'd You Only Call Me When You're High'... she did some bits in there I wish we'd have done. She gets higher than we can in the voice" Cyrus has also performed the track on selected stops of her Bangerz Tour. The performance received positive reviews. Andrea Domanick of the Las Vegas Weekly praised Cyrus' "sleek-and-sexy delivery" of the song. A critic from the Belfast Telegraph praised Cyrus' vocal performance, writing, "Cyrus has got one hell of a voice, she impressively growled through a cover of Arctic Monkeys' Why'd You Only Call Me When You're High?"

== Track listing ==
All lyrics are written by Alex Turner; all music is composed by Arctic Monkeys

CD single, digital download (version 1)
| No. | Title | Length |
|---|---|---|
| 1. | "Why'd You Only Call Me When You're High?" | 2:41 |

7-inch vinyl, digital download (version 2)
| No. | Title | Length |
|---|---|---|
| 1. | "Why'd You Only Call Me When You're High?" | 2:41 |
| 2. | "Stop the World I Wanna Get Off with You" | 3:11 |

== Personnel ==
Arctic Monkeys

- Alex Turner
- Jamie Cook
- Nick O'Malley
- Matt Helders

Additional personnel

- James Ford – production, keyboards
- Ross Orton – co-production
- Ian Shea – engineering
- Tchad Blake – mixing
- Brian Lucey – mastering

== Charts ==
=== Weekly charts ===
2013–2014 chart performance for "Why'd You Only Call Me When You're High?"
| Chart (2013–2014) | Peak position |
|---|---|
| Australia (ARIA) | 56 |
| Belgium (Ultratop 50 Flanders) | 31 |
| Belgium (Ultratip Bubbling Under Wallonia) | 22 |
| Canada Hot 100 (Billboard) | 87 |
| Canada Rock (Billboard) | 5 |
| France (SNEP) | 164 |
| Ireland (IRMA) | 33 |
| Japan Hot 100 (Billboard) | 42 |
| Scottish Singles Sales (Official Charts) | 7 |
| UK Singles (Official Charts) | 8 |
| UK Independent (Official Charts) | 1 |
| US Hot Rock & Alternative Songs (Billboard) | 14 |
| US Rock & Alternative Airplay (Billboard) | 6 |
| US Alternative Airplay (Billboard) | 5 |
| US Mainstream Rock Airplay (Billboard) | 31 |

2021–2023 weekly chart performance for "Why'd You Only Call Me When You're High?"
| Chart (2021–2023) | Peak position |
|---|---|
| Global 200 (Billboard) | 193 |
| Ireland (IRMA) | 24 |
| Lithuania (AGATA) | 26 |
| Poland (Polish Streaming Top 100) | 92 |
| Portugal (AFP) | 67 |

=== Year-end charts ===
2013 year-end chart performance for "Why'd You Only Call Me When You're High?"
| Chart (2013) | Position |
|---|---|
| UK Singles (Official Charts Company) | 143 |

2014 year-end chart performance for "Why'd You Only Call Me When You're High?"
| Chart (2014) | Position |
|---|---|
| US Hot Rock Songs (Billboard) | 29 |
| US Rock Airplay (Billboard) | 20 |
| US Alternative Songs (Billboard) | 15 |

2021 year-end chart performance for "Why'd You Only Call Me When You're High?"
| Chart (2021) | Position |
|---|---|
| Portugal (AFP) | 175 |

2022 year-end chart performance for "Why'd You Only Call Me When You're High?"
| Chart (2022) | Position |
|---|---|
| Lithuania (AGATA) | 48 |

== Certifications and sales ==
Certifications for "Why'd You Only Call Me When You're High?"
| Region | Certification | Certified units/sales |
|---|---|---|
| Australia (ARIA) | Gold | 35,000^{^} |
| Canada (Music Canada) | 6× Platinum | 480,000^{‡} |
| Denmark (IFPI Danmark) | Platinum | 90,000^{‡} |
| Italy (FIMI) | Platinum | 70,000^{‡} |
| Mexico (AMPROFON) | Gold | 30,000^{‡} |
| New Zealand (RMNZ) | 5× Platinum | 150,000^{‡} |
| Portugal (AFP) | 4× Platinum | 40,000^{‡} |
| Spain (Promusicae) | Platinum | 60,000^{‡} |
| United Kingdom (BPI) | 4× Platinum | 2,600,000 |
| United States (RIAA) | 5× Platinum | 5,000,000^{‡} |
Streaming
| Greece (IFPI Greece) | 3× Platinum | 6,000,000^{†} |
^{^} Shipments figures based on certification alone.^{‡} Sales+streaming figures based on certification alone.^{†} Streaming-only figures based on certification alone.

== Release history ==
Release history and formats for "Why'd You Only Call Me When You're High?"
| Region | Date | Format | Label |
|---|---|---|---|
| United Kingdom | 11 August 2013 | Compact disc | Domino |
| United Kingdom | 11 August 2013 | Digital download | Domino |
| Italy | 2 September 2013 | Contemporary hit radio | Domino |
| United Kingdom | 2 September 2013 | 7-inch vinyl | Domino |
| United Kingdom | 2 September 2013 | Digital download (with B-side) | Domino |
