= AM (Arctic Monkeys album) =

2013 studio album by Arctic Monkeys

Studio album by Arctic Monkeys
- Released: 6 September 2013
- Recorded: January 2012 – June 2013
- Studios: Sage & Sound, Los Angeles; Rancho De La Luna, Joshua Tree; Vox, Los Angeles (Note: Keys)
- Genres: Indie rock; alternative rock; blues rock; R&B; pop rock
- Length: 41:38
- Label: Domino
- Producers: James Ford; Ross Orton

Arctic Monkeys chronology
| Suck It and See (2011) | AM (2013) | Tranquility Base Hotel & Casino (2018) |

Singles from AM
- 1. "R U Mine?" Released: 27 February 2012; 2. "Do I Wanna Know?" Released: 19 June 2013; 3. "Why'd You Only Call Me When You're High?" Released: 11 August 2013; 4. "One for the Road" Released: 9 December 2013; 5. "Arabella" Released: 28 January 2014; 6. "Snap Out of It" Released: 9 June 2014

AM is the fifth studio album by the English rock band Arctic Monkeys, released on 6 September 2013 through Domino Recording Company. It was produced by longtime collaborator James Ford and co-produced by Ross Orton at Sage & Sound Recording in Los Angeles and Rancho De La Luna in Joshua Tree, California.

The album was promoted by the singles "R U Mine?", "Do I Wanna Know?", "Why'd You Only Call Me When You're High?", "One for the Road", "Arabella", and "Snap Out of It". It features guest appearances by Josh Homme, Bill Ryder-Jones, and Pete Thomas.

Drawing inspiration from a wide range of genres, including psychedelic rock, blues rock, hard rock, heavy metal, desert rock, R&B, funk and soul, AM notably marks Arctic Monkeys' first venture into a hip hop-influenced sound. The band took a different approach to recording the album in comparison to their previous album, Suck It and See (2011), with more emphasis on creating a "studio album" according to frontman Alex Turner. The band incorporated new instruments on the album, including the Hohner Guitaret, celeste, and vintage drum machine. Thematically, the album concerns frustration surrounding tainted romance, sex and loneliness.

AM received critical acclaim, with critics praising its darker and groovier sound in comparison to the band's previous records. It won the Brit Award for British Album of the Year, and received nominations for the Mercury Prize and the Grammy Award for Best Rock Performance for the single "Do I Wanna Know?". Several media publications have ranked AM among the best albums of 2013, of the 2010s, and of all time. NME called it the best album of the decade, and included it on its "500 Greatest Albums of All Time" list. Rolling Stone included it on the 2020 edition of its "500 Greatest Albums of All Time" list.

It was also a commercial success, debuting atop the UK Albums Chart, their fifth consecutive album to do so, selling over 157,000 copies in its first week; it also went on to be one of the UK's best-selling vinyl albums of the decade, selling 73,000 units. In addition to topping charts in several other countries, and reaching the top ten in many more, the album became the band's most successful in the United States, debuting at number six on the Billboard 200 and topping four other Billboard charts. The single "Do I Wanna Know?" became the band's first song to enter the Billboard Hot 100. In 2023, the album was certified four-times platinum in the US by the Recording Industry Association of America (RIAA).

== Production ==
=== Title ===
In an interview with Zane Lowe on BBC Radio 1, Arctic Monkeys frontman Alex Turner said that the album title was inspired by the Velvet Underground's 1985 compilation album VU: "I actually stole it from the Velvet Underground, I'll just confess that now and get it out of the way. The 'VU' record, obviously." He went on to say: "Did we cop out? Yeah! Summat about it feels like this record is exactly where we should be right now. So it felt right to just initial it."

Turner later revealed that the band had nearly titled the album The New Black, after a guitar amp they used in the recording process: "I got this old Rickenbacker thing that we recorded a lot through. There's no knobs, just two holes. And this little black amp that became known as The New Black. Crossed me mind to call the album that."

=== Josh Homme contribution ===
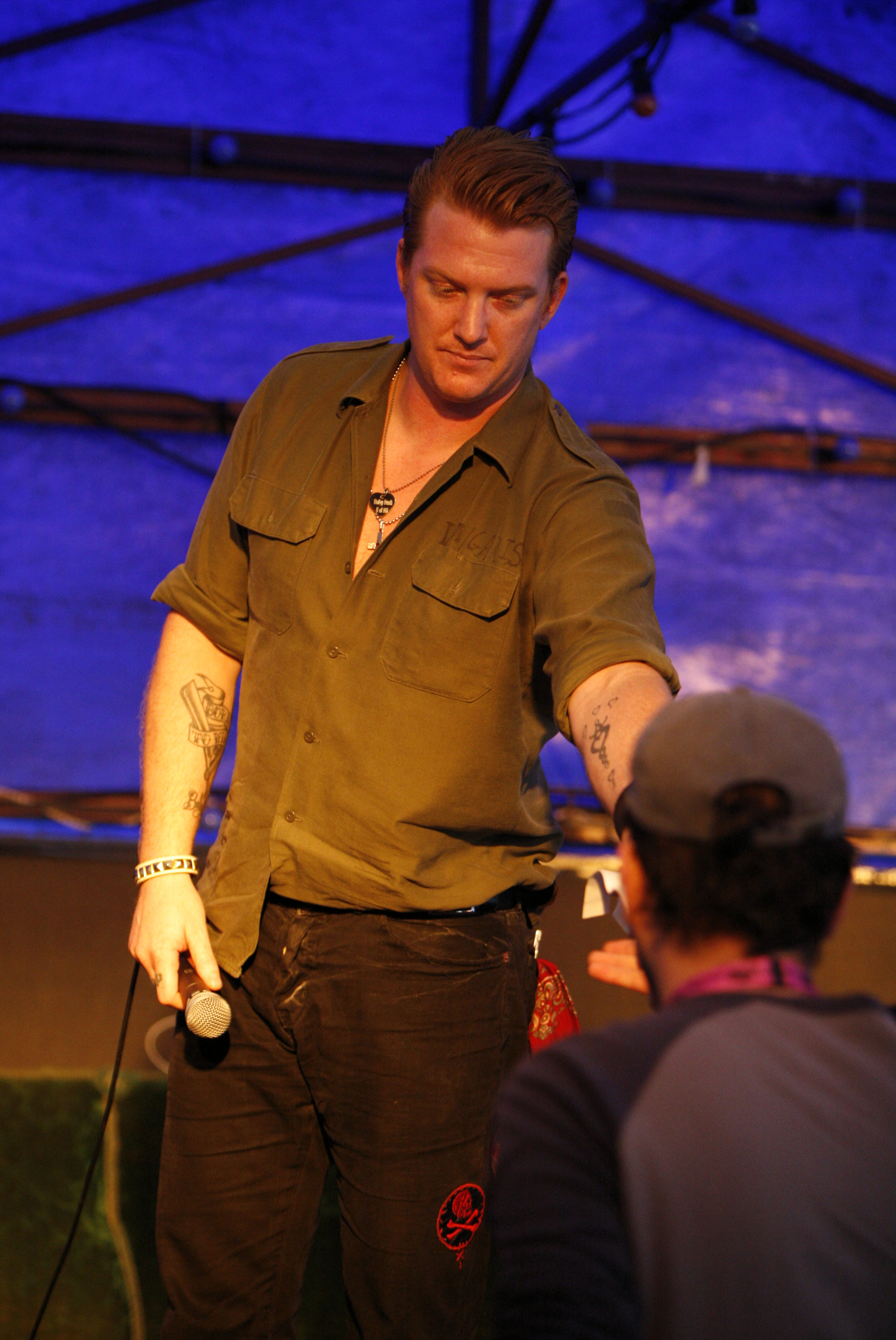
Josh Homme provided background vocals to two songs on AM.

Speaking about Josh Homme's contribution to AM with Zane Lowe, Turner said: "The Josh thing was very much a case of one of us returning a back scratch to the other", referring to his appearance as a guest vocalist on the Queens of the Stone Age album ...Like Clockwork earlier in 2013. Turner continued: "He came down and sort of got us out of a little rut. It's just fun, it's friends, extended family now – [they] came round, had a fun night. His contribution to our record is really exciting, it's probably my favourite. The 30 seconds that he's in there is just, I dunno, it's like something that I've never heard before. Not to blow my own trumpet or anything, but you know what I'm saying." In an interview with 24sata, Turner mentioned that Homme would appear in the song "Knee Socks".

On 4 July 2013, Homme mentioned AM at the Rock for People festival in the Czech Republic: "I sang on the new Arctic Monkeys record. It's a really cool, sexy after-midnight record. It's called AM, so I guess that's really obvious. And it's really good. It's really good. It's not disco [as such], but it's like a modern, dancefloor sexy record. It's really good."

== Musical style ==
The album draws inspiration from various musical genres, including indie rock, psychedelic rock, blues rock, hard rock, heavy metal, desert rock, R&B, funk, soul, and hip hop. In the first interview of the AM press campaign, Alex Turner told journalist Matt Wilkinson of NME that the album sounded "like a Dr. Dre beat, but we've given it an Ike Turner bowl-cut and sent it galloping across the desert on a Stratocaster", adding that it "sounds less like four lads playing in a room this time. Essentially, that's what it is, but if you can find a way to manipulate the instruments or the sounds to the point where it sounds a bit like a hip-hop beat that'd be boss in your car, then I think there's something quite cool about that." Turner also cited Outkast, Aaliyah, Black Sabbath, Captain Beyond and The Groundhogs as influences. Guitarist Jamie Cook also cited The Rise and Fall of Ziggy Stardust and the Spiders from Mars as an inspiration for the album, saying that it was one of the only albums they listened to while recording AM.

Arctic Monkeys took a different approach to recording AM in comparison to their previous album, Suck It and See, with Alex Turner stating that it is much more a "studio album". The band incorporated new instruments to record the album; they used keyboards such as piano, organ, and celeste, a Hohner Guitaret, and a vintage drum machine. Recording was done differently as well; producer James Ford stated that, instead of the "live" recording technique of the previous album, this album was recorded mainly with bass guitar and drums laid down first with emphasis on groove. Helder's drum kit was often set up in unconventional ways to achieve different sounds. Guest musicians Josh Homme, Bill Ryder-Jones, and Pete Thomas were featured on the album. Thematically, the album concerns frustration surrounding tainted romance, sex and loneliness.

== Promotion ==
=== AM Tour ===
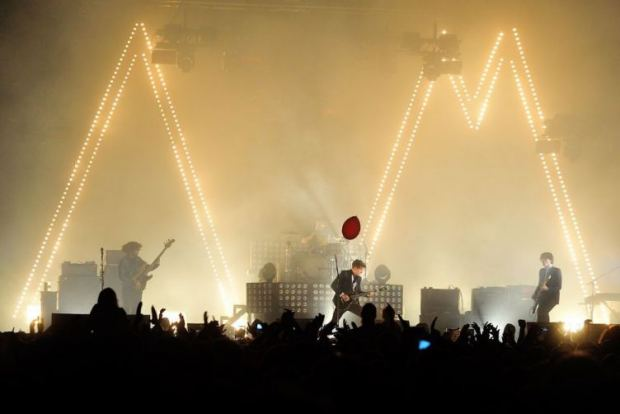
Arctic Monkeys performing at INmusic festival on 25 June 2013. The concert was a part of the AM Tour.

The AM Tour—with over 150 concert dates in Europe, North America, Australia, and New Zealand—was held to promote the album. It started on 22 May 2013 in Ventura, California. The next year, the band shared a short documentary film via their YouTube channel to mark the end of the tour in its South American leg, featuring a performance of "R U Mine?" at its final date on 15 November 2014, in Rio de Janeiro, Brazil.

=== Artwork ===
On 15 July 2013, the album cover artwork was revealed. On 2 September 2013, Arctic Monkeys revealed a track titled "I Want It All" during a XFM radio show, and exclusively played "One for the Road" on Zane Lowe's BBC Radio 1 show.

The waveform depicted is characteristic of an amplitude modulated (AM) signal, and shows "AM" in the centre, depicting the album's name.

=== Other live performances ===
Arctic Monkeys were scheduled to perform on Jimmy Kimmel Live! on 9 October 2013, but had to cancel as Kimmel's guest, rapper Kanye West, talked for too long. The band performed "Do I Wanna Know?" and "R U Mine?" on the show's outdoor stage a week later, on 16 October 2013.

=== Singles ===
The first single from the album, "R U Mine?", was released digitally on 27 February 2012. On 21 April 2012, it was released physically for the Record Store Day as a limited edition double A-side purple 7" vinyl. "R U Mine?" was released as a single on 2 March 2012.

"Do I Wanna Know?", the second single from the album, was released on 19 June 2013. The song received significant airplay, including joining BBC Radio 1's "B List", and later moving to the "A List". It was certified Silver in the UK, indicating an excess of 200,000 sales (becoming the fourth Arctic Monkeys single to do so), and has also been successful internationally.

The third single from AM, "Why'd You Only Call Me When You're High?", was released on 11 August 2013 as a single, together with an accompanying music video. The song was leaked online on 29 July 2013, but quickly taken down. The song debuted at number eight in the UK Singles Chart, becoming Arctic Monkeys' first top 10 single since "Fluorescent Adolescent" (2007).

The fourth single to promote the album, "One for the Road", was released as a digital download and 7" vinyl on 9 December 2013.

On 28 January 2014, "Arabella" was released to radio in Italy; the same month, the band confirmed that it would be released as the fifth single on 10 March 2014 in the United Kingdom. It impacted contemporary hit radio on the scheduled date, though a planned 7" vinyl release was cancelled.

"Snap Out of It" impacted contemporary hit radio in the United Kingdom on 9 June 2014 as the album's sixth single.

== Reception and legacy ==
=== Critical reception ===
Professional ratings
Aggregate scores
| Source | Rating |
|---|---|
| AnyDecentMusic? | 8.1/10 |
| Metacritic | 81/100 |
Review scores
| Source | Rating |
| AllMusic | 5/5 stars |
| The A.V. Club | B+ |
| Entertainment Weekly | A− |
| The Guardian | 4/5 stars |
| The Independent | 4/5 stars |
| NME | 10/10 |
| Pitchfork | 8.0/10 |
| Q | 4/5 stars |
| Rolling Stone | 3.5/5 stars |
| Spin | 7/10 |

AM has received critical acclaim. At Metacritic, which assigns a normalised rating out of 100 to reviews from mainstream critics, the album received an average score of 81, based on 36 reviews.

Simon Harper of Clash magazine states: "Welding inspiration from hip-hop greats with rock's titans, AM is built upon portentous beats that are dark and intimidating, yet wickedly thrilling." Ray Rahman of Entertainment Weekly gave it an 'A−', and opined that "AM mixes Velvet Underground melodies, Black Sabbath riffs, and playful grooves, and has fun doing it." Time Out said of the album: "One of Britain's greatest bands just got greater in an unexpected but hugely welcome way. Single men, I urge you: put down FHM and pick up AM." In their 10/10 review, NME wrote that AM is "absolutely and unarguably the greatest record of their career." In his 8/10 review, J.C. Maçek III of PopMatters praised Turner for being "at his most poetic to date", and called the album "a wonderfully cohesive and diverse album that fits together incredibly well." Tim Jonze of The Guardian noted that the album "manages to connect those different directions – the muscular riffs of Humbug and the wistful pop of Suck It and See – with the bristling energy and sense of fun that propelled their initial recordings." Stephen Thomas Erlewine from AllMusic agreed, stating, "Neatly splitting the difference between the band's two personalities -- the devotees of barbed British pop and disciples of curdled heavy rock -- AM consolidates Arctic Monkeys strengths, a tricky task in and of itself, but the band pushes further, incorporating unapologetic glam stomps, fuzzy guitars, and a decidedly strong rhythmic undercurrent." Pitchfork's Ryan Dombal called AM "paranoid and haunted." In his review of the album, Matt Mason of Q gave it 4 out of 5 stars and wrote:

Not afraid to explore but never radical for the sake of it, the Arctic Monkeys have delivered another triumph. Some of their iridescent energy has been tempered by age, but it's been replaced by the craft and confidence that made their [2013's] Glastonbury set so compelling. Not for the first time, they sound like the best band in Britain.

In retrospect, NME classified AM's songs as "the tales of wasted phone calls, drunken lunges and late-night confessions." By the end of the decade, according to NME, the album "became the soundtrack for countless nights out, hook-ups and comedowns in every town and city of this country".

=== Accolades ===
At the 2013 NME Awards, Arctic Monkeys were nominated for Best British Band. "R U Mine?" was also nominated for Best Track, and won the award for Best Music Video. AM was nominated for the 2013 Mercury Prize for best album, becoming the third Arctic Monkeys album to receive the nomination, after their debut album Whatever People Say I Am, That's What I'm Not, and its follow-up, Favourite Worst Nightmare. The album's second single, "Do I Wanna Know?", won the Best Track award at the 2013 Q Awards. "Do I Wanna Know" was also nominated as the "Best Rock Performance" at the 2015 Grammy Awards. At the 2014 BRIT Awards, Arctic Monkeys won in the British Album of the Year and British Group categories, becoming the first band to ever "do the double" (that is, win in both categories) three times (Coldplay and Manic Street Preachers did it twice).

NME ranked AM number 449 on their list of the 500 Greatest Albums of All Time, after it only being out for a month. The magazine also announced its list of 50 Best Albums of 2013, with AM taking the top spot: "AM felt like a genuine evolution for the Monkeys, and one that wasn't without risk. Its success, however, rested on the two things that had always made them special: Alex Turner's wry way with words, and his way with a tune." In 2019, the album was ranked number 1 on NME's list of Greatest Albums of the Decade. In 2020, the album was ranked at number 346 in the third edition of Rolling Stone's 500 Greatest Albums of All Time.

AM boasted a great amount of riches on both counts, with NME writing "AM is the album against which everything else will now be measured." 17 music journalists of the Polish media company Agora SA (Gazeta Wyborcza, Gazeta.pl, TOK FM) placed AM at number two in their ranking of 10 Best Foreign Albums of 2013, behind Arcade Fire's Reflektor.

The album has been recognised as one of the bestselling vinyl albums of the decade, selling 27,000 units as of July 2015.

Accolades for AM
| Publication | List | Rank | Ref. |
|---|---|---|---|
| Consequence of Sound | Top 50 Albums of 2013 | 45 | |
| Digital Spy | Top Albums of 2013 | 5 | |
| Gazeta Wyborcza | 10 Best Foreign Albums of 2013 | 2 | |
| Mojo | Mojo's Top 50 Albums of 2013 | 4 | |
| musicOMH | musicOMH's Top 100 Albums of 2013 | 5 | |
| NME | NME's 50 Best Albums of 2013 | 1 | |
| NME | NME's Greatest Albums of the Decade: The 2010s | 1 | |
| Pitchfork | The 200 Best Albums of the Last 25 Years (Readers' List) | 138 | |
| PopMatters | The 75 Best Albums of 2013 | 28 | |
| Q | Q's 50 Albums of the Year | 1 | |
| Rolling Stone | 50 Best Albums of 2013 | 9 | |
| Rolling Stone | 500 Greatest Albums of All Time (2020 edition) | 346 | |
| Slant Magazine | The 25 Best Albums of 2013 | 16 | |
| Stacker | 100 Best Albums of the 21st Century | 52 | |
| Time Out | 50 Best Albums of 2013 | 2 | |
| Uncut | Uncut's Top 50 Albums of 2013 | 9 | |
| Uproxx | The Best Albums Of 2013, Ranked (10 Years Later) | 2 | |

== Commercial performance ==
On 15 September 2013, the album charted at number one on the UK Albums Chart, having sold 157,329 copies, thus becoming the second fastest-selling album of the year, behind Daft Punk's Random Access Memories. With the debut of AM on the chart, Arctic Monkeys also broke a record, becoming the first independent-label band to debut at number one in the UK with their first five albums. Following the band's win at the 2014 BRIT Awards, the album charted at number two on the chart, behind Bad Blood by Bastille, who also experienced the "BRITs effect". As of June 2019, AM has spent 300 weeks in the top 100 of the UK Albums Chart.

AM peaked at number one in Australia, Belgium (Flanders), Croatia, Slovenia, Denmark, Ireland, the Netherlands, New Zealand, and Portugal, and reached top ten positions in several other countries. In the United States, the album sold 42,000 copies in its first week, and debuted at number six on the Billboard 200 chart, becoming the band's highest-charting album in the United States. In June 2024, AM was certified four-times platinum by the Recording Industry Association of America (RIAA) for combined sales and album-equivalent units of 4 million in the United States.

== Track listing ==
All lyrics are written by Alex Turner, except where noted; all music is composed by Arctic Monkeys.

| No. | Title | Lyrics | Length |
|---|---|---|---|
| 1. | "Do I Wanna Know?" | | 4:31 |
| 2. | "R U Mine?" | | 3:21 |
| 3. | "One for the Road" | | 3:26 |
| 4. | "Arabella" | | 3:27 |
| 5. | "I Want It All" | | 3:04 |
| 6. | "No. 1 Party Anthem" | | 4:03 |
| 7. | "Mad Sounds" | Alan Smyth; Turner | 3:35 |
| 8. | "Fireside" | | 3:01 |
| 9. | "Why'd You Only Call Me When You're High?" | | 2:41 |
| 10. | "Snap Out of It" | | 3:12 |
| 11. | "Knee Socks" | | 4:17 |
| 12. | "I Wanna Be Yours" | John Cooper Clarke | 3:04 |
| Total length: | | | 41:38 |

Polish and Japanese bonus track
| No. | Title | Length |
|---|---|---|
| 13. | "2013" (hidden track; begins after approximately 1-minute silence) | 2:28 |
| Total length: | | 45:18 |

iTunes live EP bonus tracks
| No. | Title | Length |
|---|---|---|
| 13. | "Do I Wanna Know?" (Live from the iTunes Festival) | 4:27 |
| 14. | "Fireside" (Live from the iTunes Festival) | 2:59 |
| 15. | "Arabella" (Live from the iTunes Festival) | 3:27 |
| 16. | "One for the Road" (Live from the iTunes Festival) | 3:28 |
| 17. | "R U Mine?" (Live from the iTunes Festival) | 3:23 |
| Total length: | | 59:27 |

Deluxe LP edition – exclusive 7" vinyl
| No. | Title | Length |
|---|---|---|
| 1. | "2013" | 2:26 |
| 2. | "Stop the World I Wanna Get Off with You" | 3:12 |
| Total length: | | 48:21 |

== Personnel ==
Personnel taken from the AM liner notes, except where noted.

Arctic Monkeys

- Alex Turner – lead and backing vocals, guitar, tambourine
- Matt Helders – drums, backing vocals, handclaps
- Jamie Cook – guitar
- Nick O'Malley – bass guitar, backing vocals, baritone guitar

Additional musicians

- James Ford – keyboards (tracks 3, 6–12), tambourine
- Josh Homme – backing vocals (tracks 3 and 11)
- Pete Thomas – percussion (track 7)
- Bill Ryder-Jones – additional guitar (track 8)

Production

- James Ford – production (except track 2)
- Ross Orton – co-production (except tracks 1 and 2), production (tracks 1 and 2), engineering (track 2)
- Ian Shea – engineering (except track 2)
- Tchad Blake – mixing
- Brian Lucey – mastering

Design

- Alex Turner – design
- Matthew Cooper – design
- Zachery Michael – photography

== Charts ==
=== Weekly charts ===
2013–2023 weekly chart performance for AM
| Chart (2013–2023) | Peak position |
|---|---|
| Australian Albums (ARIA) | 1 |
| Austrian Albums (Ö3 Austria) | 2 |
| Belgian Albums (Ultratop Flanders) | 1 |
| Belgian Albums (Ultratop Wallonia) | 4 |
| Canadian Albums (Billboard) | 3 |
| Croatian International Albums (HDU) | 1 |
| Danish Albums (Hitlisten) | 1 |
| Dutch Albums (Album Top 100) | 1 |
| Finnish Albums (Suomen virallinen lista) | 8 |
| French Albums (SNEP) | 4 |
| German Albums (Offizielle Top 100) | 3 |
| Greek Albums (IFPI) | 4 |
| Hungarian Albums (MAHASZ) | 19 |
| Irish Albums (IRMA) | 1 |
| Irish Independent Albums (IRMA) | 1 |
| Italian Albums (FIMI) | 4 |
| Japanese Albums (Oricon) | 10 |
| Latvian Albums (LaIPA) | 39 |
| Mexican Albums (Top 100 Mexico) | 8 |
| New Zealand Albums (RMNZ) | 1 |
| Norwegian Albums (VG-lista) | 5 |
| Polish Albums (ZPAV) | 3 |
| Portuguese Albums (AFP) | 1 |
| Scottish Albums (Official Charts) | 1 |
| South Korea Albums (Circle) | 49 |
| South Korea International Albums (Circle) | 12 |
| Spanish Albums (Promusicae) | 3 |
| Swedish Albums (Sverigetopplistan) | 14 |
| Swiss Albums (Schweizer Hitparade) | 2 |
| UK Albums (Official Charts) | 1 |
| UK Independent Albums (Official Charts) | 1 |
| US Billboard 200 | 6 |
| US Top Alternative Albums (Billboard) | 1 |
| US Independent Albums (Billboard) | 1 |
| US Top Rock Albums (Billboard) | 1 |
| US Indie Store Album Sales (Billboard) | 1 |

2025 weekly chart performance for AM
| Chart (2025) | Peak position |
|---|---|
| Norwegian Rock Albums (IFPI Norge) | 2 |

=== Year-end charts ===
2013 year-end chart performance for AM
| Chart (2013) | Position |
|---|---|
| Australian Albums (ARIA) | 31 |
| Belgian Albums (Ultratop Flanders) | 11 |
| Belgian Albums (Ultratop Wallonia) | 97 |
| Dutch Albums (Album Top 100) | 78 |
| French Albums (SNEP) | 124 |
| Icelandic Albums (Tónlist) | 30 |
| Irish Albums (IRMA) | 15 |
| Mexican Albums (Top 100 Mexico) | 79 |
| UK Albums (OCC) | 8 |
| US Top Alternative Albums (Billboard) | 39 |
| US Independent Albums (Billboard) | 25 |
| US Top Rock Albums (Billboard) | 64 |

2014 year-end chart performance for AM
| Chart (2014) | Position |
|---|---|
| Australian Albums (ARIA) | 20 |
| Belgian Albums (Ultratop Flanders) | 14 |
| Belgian Albums (Ultratop Wallonia) | 84 |
| Dutch Albums (Album Top 100) | 86 |
| French Albums (SNEP) | 156 |
| Mexican Albums (Top 100 Mexico) | 53 |
| New Zealand Albums (Recorded Music NZ) | 11 |
| Swedish Albums (Sverigetopplistan) | 88 |
| UK Albums (OCC) | 18 |
| US Billboard 200 | 37 |
| US Top Alternative Albums (Billboard) | 4 |
| US Independent Albums (Billboard) | 3 |
| US Top Rock Albums (Billboard) | 5 |

2015 year-end chart performance for AM
| Chart (2015) | Position |
|---|---|
| Australian Albums (ARIA) | 89 |
| Mexican Albums (Top 100 Mexico) | 67 |
| UK Albums (OCC) | 66 |
| US Billboard 200 | 79 |
| US Top Rock Albums (Billboard) | 20 |

2016 year-end chart performance for AM
| Chart (2016) | Position |
|---|---|
| Dutch Albums (Album Top 100) | 71 |
| Mexican Albums (Top 100 Mexico) | 97 |
| UK Albums (OCC) | 68 |

2017 year-end chart performance for AM
| Chart (2017) | Position |
|---|---|
| Dutch Albums (Album Top 100) | 85 |
| Polish Albums (ZPAV) | 79 |
| UK Albums (OCC) | 79 |

2018 year-end chart performance for AM
| Chart (2018) | Position |
|---|---|
| Dutch Albums (Album Top 100) | 99 |
| Portuguese Albums (AFP) | 154 |
| UK Albums (OCC) | 52 |

2019 year-end chart performance for AM
| Chart (2019) | Position |
|---|---|
| Belgian Albums (Ultratop Flanders) | 79 |
| UK Albums (OCC) | 60 |

2020 year-end chart performance for AM
| Chart (2020) | Position |
|---|---|
| Belgian Albums (Ultratop Flanders) | 61 |
| UK Albums (OCC) | 41 |

2021 year-end chart performance for AM
| Chart (2021) | Position |
|---|---|
| Australian Albums (ARIA) | 41 |
| Belgian Albums (Ultratop Flanders) | 34 |
| Belgian Albums (Ultratop Wallonia) | 154 |
| Danish Albums (Hitlisten) | 88 |
| Dutch Albums (Album Top 100) | 49 |
| Icelandic Albums (Tónlistinn) | 58 |
| Irish Albums (IRMA) | 45 |
| Italian Albums (FIMI) | 95 |
| Swedish Albums (Sverigetopplistan) | 88 |
| UK Albums (OCC) | 24 |
| US Billboard 200 | 120 |
| US Top Rock Albums (Billboard) | 18 |

2022 year-end chart performance for AM
| Chart (2022) | Position |
|---|---|
| Australian Albums (ARIA) | 27 |
| Austrian Albums (Ö3 Austria) | 72 |
| Belgian Albums (Ultratop Flanders) | 21 |
| Belgian Albums (Ultratop Wallonia) | 104 |
| Danish Albums (Hitlisten) | 73 |
| Dutch Albums (Album Top 100) | 22 |
| Icelandic Albums (Tónlistinn) | 35 |
| Italian Albums (FIMI) | 69 |
| Lithuanian Albums (AGATA) | 3 |
| Swedish Albums (Sverigetopplistan) | 62 |
| UK Albums (OCC) | 13 |
| US Billboard 200 | 105 |
| US Independent Albums (Billboard) | 12 |
| US Top Rock Albums (Billboard) | 15 |

2023 year-end chart performance for AM
| Chart (2023) | Position |
|---|---|
| Australian Albums (ARIA) | 31 |
| Austrian Albums (Ö3 Austria) | 29 |
| Belgian Albums (Ultratop Flanders) | 13 |
| Belgian Albums (Ultratop Wallonia) | 72 |
| Danish Albums (Hitlisten) | 68 |
| Dutch Albums (Album Top 100) | 13 |
| Hungarian Albums (MAHASZ) | 27 |
| Icelandic Albums (Tónlistinn) | 29 |
| Italian Albums (FIMI) | 50 |
| New Zealand Albums (RMNZ) | 24 |
| Polish Albums (ZPAV) | 25 |
| Swedish Albums (Sverigetopplistan) | 34 |
| UK Albums (OCC) | 9 |
| US Billboard 200 | 78 |
| US Independent Albums (Billboard) | 11 |
| US Top Rock Albums (Billboard) | 9 |

2024 year-end chart performance of AM
| Chart (2024) | Position |
|---|---|
| Australian Albums (ARIA) | 35 |
| Austrian Albums (Ö3 Austria) | 28 |
| Belgian Albums (Ultratop Flanders) | 11 |
| Belgian Albums (Ultratop Wallonia) | 68 |
| Croatian International Albums (HDU) | 19 |
| Danish Albums (Hitlisten) | 71 |
| Dutch Albums (Album Top 100) | 22 |
| German Albums (Offizielle Top 100) | 50 |
| Hungarian Albums (MAHASZ) | 31 |
| Icelandic Albums (Tónlistinn) | 46 |
| Italian Albums (FIMI) | 72 |
| Polish Albums (ZPAV) | 24 |
| Swedish Albums (Sverigetopplistan) | 50 |
| UK Albums (OCC) | 21 |
| US Billboard 200 | 105 |

2025 year-end chart performance of AM
| Chart (2025) | Position |
|---|---|
| Australian Albums (ARIA) | 34 |
| Austrian Albums (Ö3 Austria) | 29 |
| Croatian International Albums (HDU) | 28 |
| Dutch Albums (Album Top 100) | 28 |
| German Albums (Offizielle Top 100) | 64 |
| Hungarian Albums (MAHASZ) | 31 |
| Icelandic Albums (Tónlistinn) | 53 |
| Polish Albums (ZPAV) | 36 |
| Swedish Albums (Sverigetopplistan) | 51 |
| Swiss Albums (Schweizer Hitparade) | 63 |
| UK Albums (OCC) | 22 |
| US Billboard 200 | 87 |

=== Decade-end charts ===
Decade-end chart performance for AM
| Chart (2010–2019) | Position |
|---|---|
| Australian Albums (ARIA) | 63 |
| UK Albums (OCC) | 27 |
| UK Vinyl Albums (OCC) | 6 |
| US Top Rock Albums (Billboard) | 19 |

== Certifications and sales ==
| Region | Certification | Certified units/sales |
|---|---|---|
| Australia (ARIA) | 2× Platinum | 140,000^{^} |
| Belgium (BRMA) | Gold | 15,000^{*} |
| Canada (Music Canada) | 5× Platinum | 400,000^{‡} |
| Denmark (IFPI Danmark) | 4× Platinum | 80,000^{‡} |
| France (SNEP) | Platinum | 100,000^{‡} |
| Iceland (FHF) | — | 3,699 |
| Ireland (IRMA) | Platinum | 15,000^{^} |
| Italy (FIMI) | 4× Platinum | 200,000^{‡} |
| Mexico (AMPROFON) | Platinum+Gold | 90,000^{^} |
| Netherlands (NVPI) | Platinum | 50,000^{‡} |
| New Zealand (RMNZ) | 7× Platinum | 105,000^{‡} |
| Norway (IFPI Norway) | Gold | 15,000^{‡} |
| Poland (ZPAV) | Platinum | 20,000^{‡} |
| Portugal (AFP) | Platinum | 7,000^{‡} |
| United Kingdom (BPI) | 7× Platinum | 2,200,000 |
| United States (RIAA) | 4× Platinum | 4,000,000^{‡} |
^{*} Sales figures based on certification alone.^{^} Shipments figures based on certification alone.^{‡} Sales+streaming figures based on certification alone.

== Release history ==
Release history for AM
| Country | Date | Label | Format(s) |
|---|---|---|---|
| Australia | 6 September 2013 | Domino | CD; digital download |
| France | 9 September 2013 | Domino | CD; LP; Deluxe LP; digital download |
| Germany | 9 September 2013 | Domino | CD; LP; Deluxe LP; digital download |
| United Kingdom | 9 September 2013 | Domino | CD; LP; Deluxe LP; digital download |
| Poland | 10 September 2013 | NoPaper | CD; LP; digital download |
| United States | 10 September 2013 | Domino | CD; LP; Deluxe LP; digital download |
