= R U Mine? =

Single by Arctic Monkeys

from the album AM
- B-side: "Electricity"
- Released: 27 February 2012
- Recorded: January 2012 in Sheffield, England
- Genre: Stoner rock; garage rock; hard rock; psychedelic rock; blues rock
- Length: 3:20
- Label: Domino
- Composers: Jamie Cook; Matt Helders; Nick O'Malley; Alex Turner
- Lyricist: Alex Turner
- Producer: Ross Orton

Arctic Monkeys singles chronology
"Black Treacle" (2012)	"R U Mine?" (2012)	"Do I Wanna Know?" (2013)

Music video
- "R U Mine?" on YouTube

"R U Mine?" is a song by the English indie rock band Arctic Monkeys. It features lyrics written by frontman Alex Turner, as well as music composed by the entire band. The song was released as a digital download in the United Kingdom on 27 February 2012 and was released physically for the Record Store Day on 21 April 2012 on a limited edition double A-side purple 7" vinyl along with new song "Electricity". The vinyl was limited to a run of only 1,750 copies.

"R U Mine?" debuted at number twenty-three on the UK Singles Chart; the band's highest charting single since "Crying Lightning" reached number twelve (12) in July 2009. Despite originally being released as a standalone single, the song was later included on their fifth studio album, AM (2013), albeit slightly remixed. It was later certified platinum in the UK, making it one of the Arctic Monkeys' best-selling songs.

The song was also featured in the video games Forza Horizon and Rocksmith 2014. It was also featured in the video game Guitar Hero Live. It was released as a downloadable song for the rhythm game Rock Band 3 on January 13, 2015; one of the first three downloadable songs released for Rock Band 3 in almost two years.

== Inspiration ==
Alex Turner said that the band drew inspiration from recent relationships, saying "There's a few references for people to pick up on in there – 'Some Velvet Morning', Tracy Island. That particular bit is like the thing Lil Wayne and Drake do. [...] I like that thing they do where they talk about something backwards, so they talk about it but then say what it actually is on the next line. [...] So I say, 'I'm a puppet on a string', just before mentioning Tracy Island. That's what it's about – uncertainty." Turner also described the track as "Kind of a lift from an Ashanti tune. We like the scales and the melodies on some of those records. The way the backing vocals might come right to the front and disappear again".

The main riff of the song was written by bassist Nick O'Malley, while the band were recording the B-side "Evil Twin".

== Reception ==
Music magazine NME ranked the song at number 49 among 100 greatest songs of 2010s.

== Music videos ==
A music video to accompany the release of "R U Mine?" was first released onto YouTube on 27 February 2012 at a total length of three minutes and forty-four seconds and features radio DJ, musician and former Sex Pistols guitarist Steve Jones debuting the song on his show on American modern rock radio station KROQ-FM while Matt Helders, Alex Turner and Nick O'Malley lip-sync the song in a car. In 2013, the video won the NME Award for Best Video.

Drummer Matt Helders, who came up with the idea for the video, revealed it was directed by Focus Creeps, who 'gave [the band] a camera and told us to film'.

A second video was released onto YouTube on 29 March 2012, following their live show in Mexico City one day earlier. The video depicts a live performance of the song and shots of the excited crowd. It ends with an image of Turner's microphone with two bras hanging from it. Both videos feature Helders wearing a Sixpack France Lucifer jacket, a reference to Kenneth Anger's Lucifer Rising. The jacket also appears in the "Don't Sit Down 'Cause I've Moved Your Chair" music video.

== Track listing ==
All lyrics are written by Alex Turner; all music is composed by Arctic Monkeys

Digital download
No.	Title	Length
1.	"R U Mine?"	3:20

7" (UK Record Store Day limited edition) and second digital download
No.	Title	Length
1.	"R U Mine?"	3:20
2.	"Electricity"	3:01

== Personnel ==
Personnel taken from the AM liner notes.

Arctic Monkeys

- Alex Turner
- Jamie Cook
- Nick O'Malley
- Matt Helders

Production

- Ross Orton – production, engineering
- Tchad Blake – mixing
- Brian Lucey – mastering

== Charts ==
=== "R U Mine?" ===
==== Weekly charts ====
Chart (2012)	Peak position
Australia (ARIA)	94
Belgium (Ultratip Bubbling Under Flanders)	11
Canada Rock (Billboard)	43
France (SNEP)	147
Scotland Singles (OCC)	19
UK Singles (OCC)	23
UK Indie (OCC)	2

Chart (2014–2015)	Peak position
US Bubbling Under Hot 100 (Billboard)	22
US Hot Rock & Alternative Songs (Billboard)	39
US Rock & Alternative Airplay (Billboard)	5

==== Year-end charts ====
Chart (2014)	Position
US Hot Rock Songs (Billboard)	84
Chart (2015)	Position
US Rock Airplay (Billboard)	25

=== "Electricity" ===
Chart (2012)	Peak position
UK Indie (OCC)	10
UK Singles (OCC)	128

== Certifications ==
Region	Certification	Certified units/sales
Canada (Music Canada)	3× Platinum	240,000^{‡}
Denmark (IFPI Danmark)	Gold	45,000^{‡}
Italy (FIMI)	Platinum	50,000^{‡}
New Zealand (RMNZ)	3× Platinum	90,000^{‡}
Spain (Promusicae)	Platinum	60,000^{‡}
Portugal (AFP)	2× Platinum	40,000^{‡}
United Kingdom (BPI)	4× Platinum	2,400,000^{‡}
United States (RIAA)	3× Platinum	3,000,000^{‡}
^{‡} Sales+streaming figures based on certification alone.

== Release history ==
Region	Date	Format	Label
United Kingdom	27 February 2012	Digital download	Domino
United States	12 March 2012	Modern rock radio	Domino
United Kingdom	21 April 2012	Double A-side 7" vinyl	Domino
