= Ross Orton =

English musician

Ross Orton is an English songwriter, producer, and musician based in Sheffield. Orton is known for his work as drummer in Add N to (X) and as part of electro trio Fat Truckers, and since that band's split in 2004 has formed the Cavemen songwriting/production duo with Pulp's Steve Mackey.

His songwriting/production work includes the Arctic Monkeys' 2013 album AM, the Mercury Music Prize-nominated Arular by M.I.A., and work for the Fall, Toddla T, Drenge, Roots Manuva, Kid Acne, Bromheads Jacket as well as Sheffield electronic artists including Kings Have Long Arms and the Lovers. Orton has remixed artists including The Kills, Kelis, the Dooleys, Duffy, Esser, Tinchy Stryder and Ladyhawke.

Orton played drums on Jarvis Cocker's 2006 album Jarvis and on the 2009 album Further Complications.
