= Piledriver Waltz =

2011 song by Alex Turner and Arctic Monkeys

Song by Alex Turner and Arctic Monkeys

from the EP Submarine and the album Suck It and See
- Released: 14 March 2011 (Submarine); 6 June 2011 (Suck It and See)
- Recorded: April 2010 (original); Late 2010–February 2011 (re-recording)
- Studio: One Inch, London; Air, London (Note: Strings recorded only.) (Submarine); Sound City, Los Angeles (Suck It and See)
- Genre: Baroque pop
- Length: 3:23
- Label: Domino
- Songwriters: Alex Turner; Jamie Cook
- Producer: James Ford

"Piledriver Waltz" is a song by English musician Alex Turner from his debut solo extended play (EP), Submarine (2011), which was later re-recorded for the Arctic Monkeys's fourth studio album, Suck It and See (2011). A baroque pop song, it is centered around a forlorn love having breakfast at the "Heartbreak Hotel". It was written by frontman Alex Turner and guitarist Jamie Cook, and was produced by James Ford.

Film director Richard Ayoade contacted Turner to discuss making music for a film adaptation of Joe Dunthorne's novel Submarine (2008). Turner initially felt he was not qualified, but considered it an exception due to his friendship with Ayoade. Turner wrote five original songs for the film, with "Piledriver Waltz" being the only one that was not written specifically for it. It was first recorded in April 2010 at One Inch Studios in London, with the strings being recorded at Air Studios by the Composers Ensemble. The song was later re-recorded between late 2010 and February 2011 at Sound City Studios in Los Angeles for Suck It and See.

"Piledriver Waltz" was first released on the soundtrack for Submarine on 14 March 2011; the re-recorded version was released on Suck It and See on 6 June. The song received positive reviews from critics, who praised its composition and musical structure. Critics have deemed it to be a standout on both the Submarine film and on the Arctic Monkeys's discography as a whole. During the Verftet Online Music Festival in 2020, the Norwegian musical project Boy Pablo performed a cover of "Piledriver Waltz".

== Background and release ==
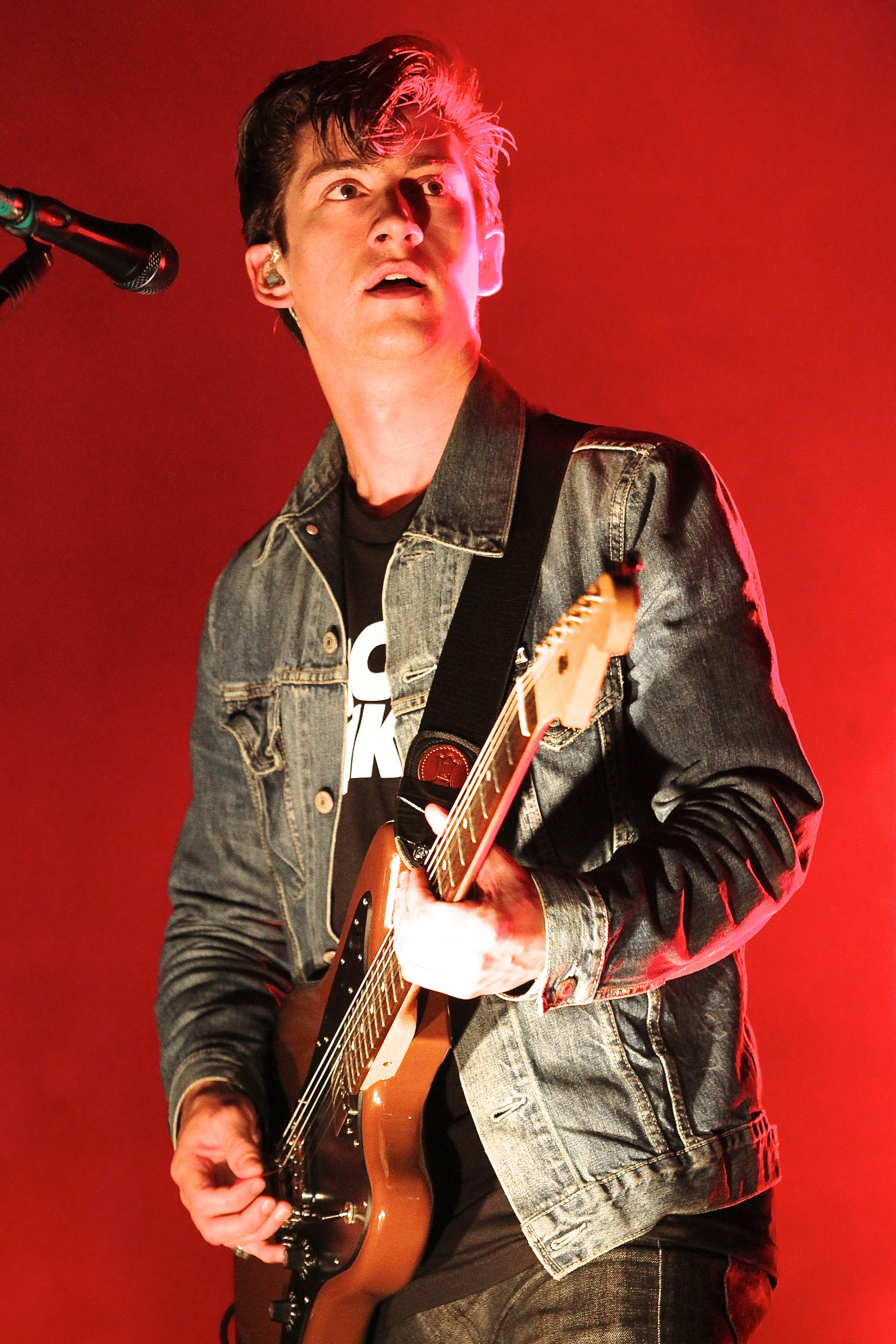
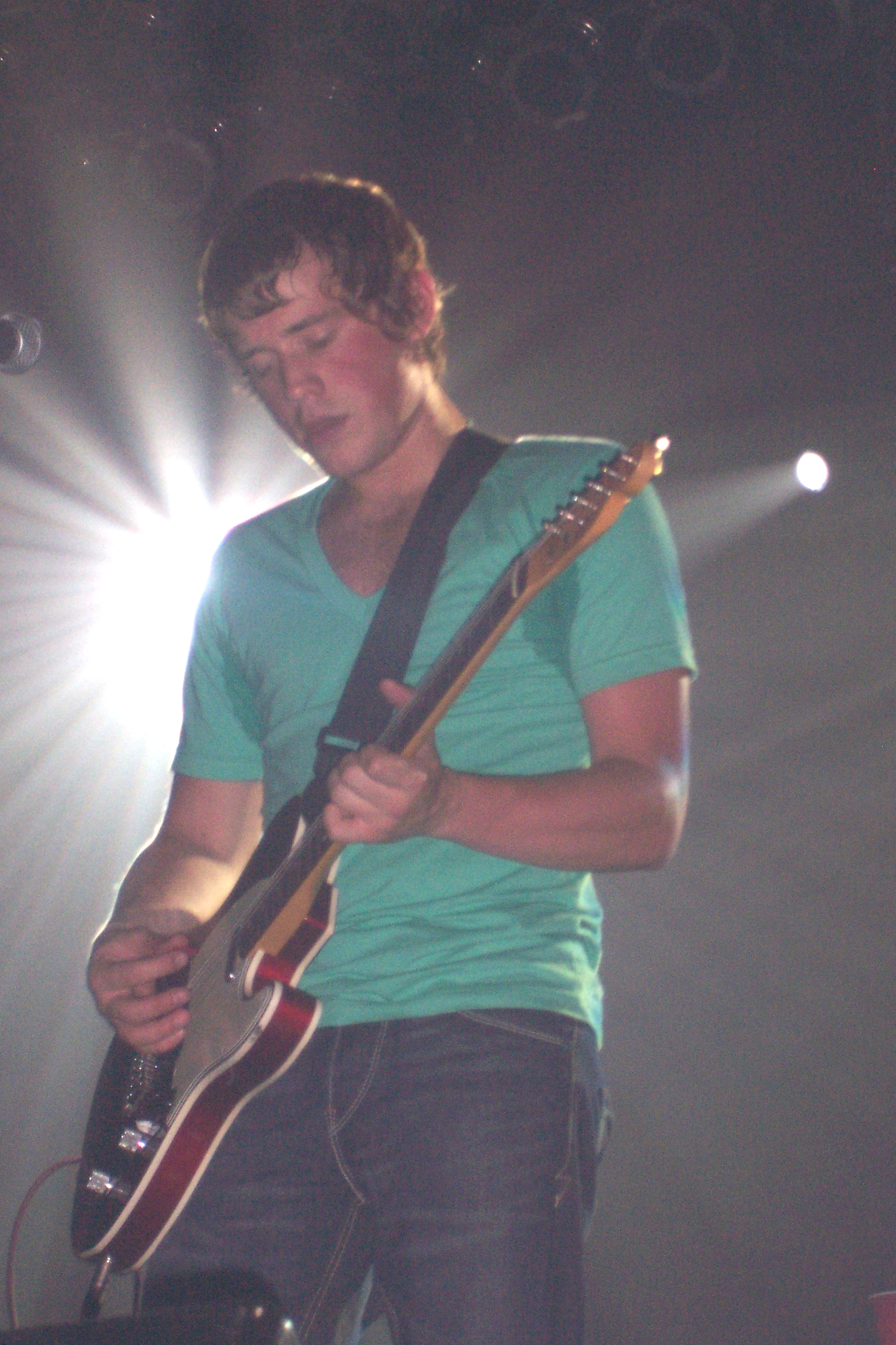
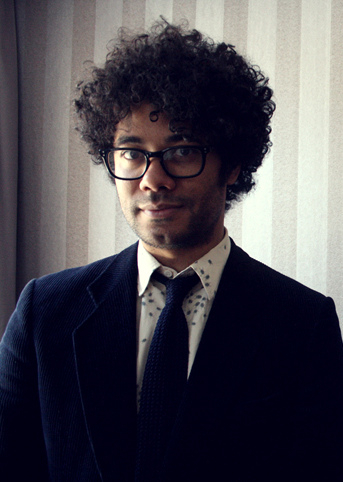
"Piledriver Waltz" was written by both Alex Turner (left, pictured in 2011) and Jamie Cook (centre, pictured in 2008), for inclusion in director Richard Ayoade's film, Submarine (right, pictured in 2011).

Following the release of Arctic Monkeys' third studio album, Humbug, in August 2009, the band began writing material for their next album, Suck It and See (2011). During this time, film director Richard Ayoade was directing a film adaptation of Joe Dunthorne's 2008 novel, Submarine. Ayoade contacted frontman Alex Turner to see whether he could compose songs for the film. Initially, Turner felt that making music for a film was something he was not "qualified" to do, but considered it "an exception" due to his friendship with Ayoade. Turner wrote five original songs for the film, however, "Piledriver Waltz" was not written specifically for it. Turner showed Ayoade an early version of "Piledriver Waltz", which Ayoade liked; they both decided that it should be used for the film.

Turner recorded "Piledriver Waltz" in April 2010 at One Inch Studios in London, with James Ford serving as producer. The song was written by Turner and guitarist Jamie Cook. It was mixed by Ford, and mastered by George Marino for the Suck It and See re-recording. Although not credited, Ford provided drums on the original recording. The strings were recorded at Air Studios, arranged by Owen Pallett and performed by the Composers Ensemble. Recording sessions for "Piledriver Waltz", for inclusion on the album Suck It and See, began in East London in late-2010, and were completed in February 2011 at Sound City Studios in Los Angeles, California.

"Piledriver Waltz" was first announced as the sixth and final track on the EP on 7 February 2011; the EP was released on 14 March through the Domino Recording Company. Submarine was released theatrically in the United Kingdom on 18 March 2011, followed by a 3 June release in the United States; "Piledriver Waltz" was featured in the film. A music video was also released, featuring footage of actors Craig Roberts and Yasmin Paige, who play Oliver Tate and Jordana Bevan in the film, respectively. During the promotion of Suck It and See, the song was revealed on 10 March 2011 to be the ninth track on the album. The song, along with the album, were released onto streaming on 30 May 2011, and was released officially in the United States on 6 June. The Norwegian musical project Boy Pablo performed a cover of "Piledriver Waltz" during the 2020 Verftet Online Music Festival.

== Composition and lyrics ==
"Piledriver Waltz" is a mid-tempo ballad that has been considered a baroque pop song; it has a length of three minutes and 23 seconds. Fraser McAlpine of BBC Music described "Piledriver Waltz" to be the "most musically complex" song from the EP, with "two time signatures, no less". Its sound style has been called "woozily romantic", particularly in the lyrics, "You look like you've been for breakfast at the Heartbreak Hotel." The Rolling Stone staff considered it to have elements of "agony and woe" in it. Lyrically, the song tells a story of a forlorn love having breakfast at the metaphorical "Heartbreak Hotel", where the waitresses working there are miserable, as is the food. Additionally, it was described by Alex Hudson of Exclaim! to be a "big departure from the snarky, electrified garage rock Turner is known for with Arctic Monkeys".

== Critical reception ==
"Piledriver Waltz" received positive reviews from music critics, with some considering it to be a standout on Submarine. Ali Plumb, writing for BBC News, ranked it at number two on a list of songs that shaped five teen films, stating that he preferred the Submarine version over the Suck It and See one. Emily Barker of NME wrote that "Piledriver Waltz" may not be the most "motivating anthem", but that it was "still a banger". McAlpine considered it to be the most "reproachful" song off of Submarine. Neil Ashman of Drowned in Sound praised the song's composition, writing that it was the most "finest" and most "direct" song on the EP. The staff writing for Consequence claimed that "Piledriver Waltz" had some of Turner's "most vivid and abstract metaphors". Rob Hakimian, writing for Beats Per Minute, deemed it to be his favorite off of Submarine. Matt Mitchell of Paste placed it at number 40 on a list of the 40 Greatest Arctic Monkeys Songs, highlighting Cook's guitar-playing on the Suck It and See recording. In October 2016, the staff of NME ranked "Piledriver Waltz" as the thirty-third best song released in 2011. Sophie Williams of NME deemed "Piledriver Waltz" as the band's fortieth-best song. In August 2023, the staff at Rolling Stone placed "Piledriver Waltz" at number 19 on a list of the 30 Greatest Arctic Monkeys Songs.

== Credits and personnel ==
Credits are adapted from the digital liner notes.

Submarine (original recording)
- Alex Turner – guitar, piano, lead vocals, songwriter
- The Composers Ensemble – strings
  - Owen Pallett – arrangement
  - Andrew Hewitt – conducting
  - Jake Jackson – recording

Additional personnel

- James Ford – producer, mixing engineer, drums (uncredited)

Suck It and See (re-recording)
- Alex Turner – lead vocals, guitar, keyboards, songwriter
- Jamie Cook – guitar, keyboards, songwriter
- Nick O'Malley – bass guitar, backing vocals
- Matt Helders – drums, backing vocals

Additional personnel

- James Ford – producer
- Craig Silvey – mixing engineer
- Morgan Stratton – assistant mixing engineer
- Bryan Wilson – assistant mixing engineer
- James Brown – engineer
- David Covell – assistant engineer
- Sean Oakley – assistant engineer
- George Marino – mastering engineer
