= Submarine (EP) =

2011 soundtrack EP by Alex Turner

EP and soundtrack by Alex Turner
- Released: 14 March 2011
- Recorded: April 2010
- Studios: One Inch, London; Air, London (Note: Strings on track 6)
- Genre: Indie folk
- Length: 19:03
- Label: Domino
- Producer: James Ford

Submarine is the debut solo extended play (EP) by the English musician and Arctic Monkeys frontman Alex Turner, released on 14 March 2011 through the Domino Recording Company. It was produced in London by frequent collaborator James Ford, alongside guest musician Bill Ryder-Jones, and string arranger Owen Pallett. The EP consists of six original songs written by Turner that act as the soundtrack to Richard Ayoade's debut feature film, Submarine (2010), based on the 2008 novel by Joe Dunthorne. The artwork is a resized version of the film's poster, which depicts lead actor Craig Roberts, who portrayed main character Oliver Tate in the film.

Submarine is a departure from Turner's previous guitar-heavy work with the Arctic Monkeys. It features an Indie folk sound, drawing influences from baroque pop and psychedelic pop. Instrumentally, it incorporates acoustic guitar, drums, piano, and features additional strings; its lyrics reflect on themes of romance.

Submarine received generally positive reviews from critics, with many praising its style and sound. It peaked at number 35 in the UK Albums Chart, while also charting in France. Following its release, it appeared on The Times's 2014 list of 100 Soundtracks to Love. Retrospectively, Submarine is considered a stepping stone in Turner's continued musical experimentation, leading to one of its tracks, "Piledriver Waltz", being re-recorded by Arctic Monkeys for their fourth album Suck It and See. The soundtrack has been described as being the most discussed feature of its accompanying film, contributing to its lasting popularity. In 2025, Submarine was certified gold by the British Phonographic Industry (BPI).

== Background and recording ==
Arctic Monkeys released their third studio album, Humbug, in August 2009. It received positive reviews from critics, (Note: Attributed to multiple references:) noting that the album's tone was darker, compared to the band's previous work. Following the release of Humbug, film director and friend Richard Ayoade was directing a film adaptation of Joe Dunthorne's 2008 novel, Submarine. Ayoade thought of Turner for the film's soundtrack, with the only concern of seeming "imposing" by asking him to do "a load of work." Turner said that making music for a film was something he felt was not "qualified to do" but that this was "an exception" due to his friendship with Ayoade. Initially he approached him with the idea of doing cover versions, similarly to how it was done in The Graduate (1967), but ended up using six original songs written by Turner. Some of the versions that were recorded included John Cale's Fear is a Man's Best Friend and Big White Cloud, Nico's I'm Not Sayin', and Irving Berlin's How Deep is the Ocean?.

After finishing the Humbug Tour, Turner wrote the songs at his home in Brooklyn, New York. He already had some done– including 'It's Hard to Get Around the Wind' and 'Hiding Tonight'– that he felt could not be released with Arctic Monkeys or his side project the Last Shadow Puppets, due to him "picking an acoustic guitar" not fitting the bands' current styles. He found that relaxed type of playing "refreshing." Turner showed those songs to Ayoade and then wrote the rest, although he had read the book at Ayoade's request and watched the dailies from the film set, he said they were not particularly written based on the film scenes.

In April 2010, Turner recorded the EP at One Inch studios in London with frequent collaborator James Ford serving as producer. Turner and Ford played most of the instruments, while Bill Ryder-Jones played guitar on two tracks. The strings for "Piledriver Waltz" were recorded by Jake Jackson at Air Studios in London, and arranged by Owen Pallett, with Andrew Hewitt serving as conductor. At the time, the edit of the film was more advanced, "Richard came down, and we played with some of the structures of the songs to make them fit a bit better, in terms of the length being right" Turner recalled.

== Composition ==
=== Musical style and influences ===
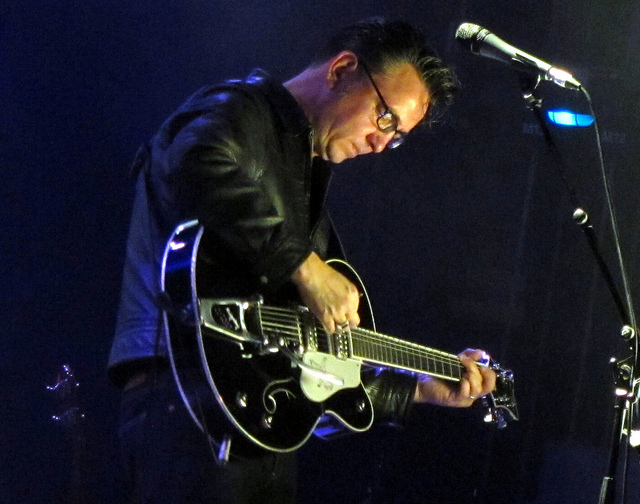
Several music critics cited Richard Hawley as having influenced the EP's style.

In his first effort as a solo artist, Turner changed his habitual rock style for a more simple, acoustic driven sound. It has been characterised as Indie folk. Further incorporating influences from baroque pop and psychedelic pop. Its sound has been described as being "in a stripped down, mainly acoustic vein." Instrumentally, it incorporates acoustic guitar, drums, and piano, featuring additional strings. In terms of lyrics, Turner tried to avoid, "making them about the character too much, or [...] being like a narration," and wanted them to complement what was happening on screen, "without it being too direct, that was like the balance we trying to strive for, certainly in the lyrics and the tunes." Since its release, critics have compared the EP to the works of Richard Hawley, Bob Dylan, Simon & Garfunkel, John Lennon, Roy Orbison, Scott Walker, and Cat Stevens's soundtrack for Harold and Maude.

=== Songs ===
The opening track is a snippet of "Stuck in a Puzzle," the fifth track. The intro is followed by "Hiding Tonight," which has a "Richard Hawley-esque tone," with a "totally unobtrusive" instrumentation, featuring a "quiet guitar," and "dry electric notes" that "echo around the periphery upon a invitingly fuzzy organ drone." With a "undramatic and unhurried" melody, and similar vocal delivery, that retains Turner's "characteristically wordy style." The lyrics make a reference to the traditional game coconut shy. Overall, the song has been described as "a gently meandering meditation on unrequited yearning," as well as, "quiet, serene." It was compared to Hawley's Coles Corner.

"Piledriver Waltz"
A 19-second sample from "Piledriver Waltz". Turner wanted the lyrics to reflect what was happening on screen, without being too "direct".

In "Glass in the Park" Drowned In Sound noted the influence of Roy Orbison, Scott Walker, and Hawley. Instrumentally, it has a "swoon-worthy" melody and "seductive fretboard slides," featuring "maybe a harmony or two." Glass in the Park was one of the oldest songs in the EP, alongside "Hiding Tonight." Both were written before Ayoade approached Turner to do the soundtrack, he thought they wouldn't fit as part of his bands' sound, so he played them to Ayoade, who thought they would be a good choice for the film. Lyrically, it recounts "a lazy afternoon between two young lovers, whispering impossibly grand promises to each other."

"It's Hard to Get Around the Wind" is a folk track that has been described as a "Dylanesque puzzler", and compared to Simon & Garfunkel. Turner's voice has a "humble charm," with the lyrics being "reproachful and flinty." Instrumentally it features Turner "finger-picking" on his acoustic guitar. "Stuck in the Puzzle" has "psych-pop flourishes." Described as the "most musically straightforward track, with a fuller sound." Instrumentally, it "broadens the sonic palette with drums, piano and a shimmer of strings." Lyrically it "carries itself like an early Lennon song," changing "post-Beatles angst" for "a late-night head-scratch about the state of things." The final track, "Piledriver Waltz", is a mid-tempo ballad that has been considered a baroque pop song, featuring an orchestral arrangement by Owen Pallet. The track has been said to be "the most musically complex" of the record, with "two time signatures, no less." Described as "woozily romantic" with "a mundane bent that avoids sentimentality," and the "finest and most direct song," despite, "the oddity of a change in signature for the gorgeous chorus," as well as, "the most reproachful." Like the first two tracks, "Piledriver Waltz" was not written specifically for the film.

== Release and commercial performance ==
Submarine was announced on 7 February 2011. It was later released on 14 March, through the Domino Recording Company, (Note: Compact disc catalogue number RUG398CD, 10-inch vinyl catalogue number RUG398T.) just days before the film made its debut in the United Kingdom on 18 March. The cover art is a downscaled version of the film's poster, which depicts lead actor Craig Roberts, who portrayed main character Oliver Tate. In the United Kingdom, Submarine reached number 35 on the week of 19 March, and also peaked at 97 on the French Albums chart. On 28 February 2025, it was certified gold by the British Phonographic Industry (BPI), indicating shipment of over 100,000 units.

== Critical reception ==
Professional ratings
Aggregate scores
Source	Rating
AnyDecentMusic?	7.0/10
Metacritic	74/100
Review scores
Source	Rating
AllMusic	3/5 stars
BBC Music	8/10
Beats Per Minute	8.6/10
Consequence of Sound	C+
Drowned In Sound	8/10
The Independent	3/5 stars
The Line of Best Fit	7/10
MusicOMH	4/5 stars
Pitchfork	7.6/10
Sputnikmusic	3/5
Uncut	7/10

Submarine received generally favourable reviews from critics, and despite it stylistic deviation, was enjoyed by listeners. At Metacritic, which assigns a normalised rating out of 100 to reviews from mainstream publications, the album received a score of 74, based on 9 reviews.

Paul Thompson of Pitchfork felt "Turner's keen wit and eye for detail" had created a "tender portrayal" of adolescent uncertainty. Ben Walsh of The Independent said the "exquisite" soundtrack was "reminiscent" of Cat Stevens's work on Harold and Maude. For Drowned In Sound, Neil Ashman thought that similarly to his record with the Last Shadow Puppets, the "late Sixties and early Seventies" provided inspiration, nevertheless, "the mood of gentle wistfulness" was very different to the Puppets' "tactical bombast." He praised the songs' quality as being "on an upward trajectory from start to end." Fraser McAlpine of BBC Music described the record as "five swoony songs, sung beautifully, no duffers, and plenty of knotty lyrics to try and unravel," he also praised Turner's voice and lyrics, adding, "anyone who can sell a line like "If you’re gonna try and walk on water make sure you wear your comfortable shoes" is someone who needs no puffing up." When talking about the difference between this record and Turner's previous work, Alex Young of Consequence of Sound, said "perhaps surprisingly, his balladry is second to none," and that "it’d be easy to turn your nose at it, but this is as good as any work he’s done, however different it may be."

In another The Independent review, Andy Gill noted the EP found Turner, "in appropriately reflective, wistful mood," but that, "the beguiling mood of abstracted adolescent self-importance" was a constant throughout. Stephen Thomas Erlewine of AllMusic thought Turner was straddling "a fine line of providing hushed mood music for a film, and delving into someplace deeper," and that the casual nature of the songs kept them, "from truly resonating."

=== Accolades and retrospective commentary ===
In 2011, Submarine appeared at number 32 on NME's Best Albums of the Year list, with "Piledriver Waltz" being at 33 on the Best Tracks list. In 2014, it appeared on The Times's list of 100 Soundtracks to Love. Retrospectively, Submarine is considered a stepping stone in Turner's continued musical experimentation, inspiring the general sound of Turner's band Arctic Monkeys', fourth album Suck It and See, leading to the inclusion on the album of a re-recording of "Piledriver Waltz", and paving the way for Tranquility Base Hotel & Casino (2018), and The Car (2022). The soundtrack has been described as "the most discussed" feature of its accompanying film, contributing to its lasting popularity.

== Track listing ==
All tracks are written by Alex Turner.

No.	Title	Length
1.	"Stuck on the Puzzle (Intro)"	0:53
2.	"Hiding Tonight"	3:06
3.	"Glass in the Park"	3:59
4.	"It's Hard to Get Around the Wind"	4:07
5.	"Stuck on the Puzzle"	3:31
6.	"Piledriver Waltz"	3:24
Total length:		19:03

== Credits and personnel ==
Credits are adapted from the liner notes of Submarine.

- Alex Turner – music
- James Ford – music, production, mixing
- Bill Ryder-Jones – guitar (tracks 2 and 4)
- The Composers Ensemble – strings (track 6)
  - Owen Pallett – arrangement
  - Andrew Hewitt – conducting
  - Jake Jackson – recording

== Charts ==
Chart (2011)	Peak position
French Albums (SNEP)	97
UK Albums Chart (Official Charts Company)	35

== Certifications and sales ==
Region	Certification	Certified units/sales
United Kingdom (BPI)	Gold	100,000^{^}
^{^} Shipments figures based on certification alone.
