= Iechyd Da =

Studio album by Bill Ryder-Jones
- Released: 12 January 2024
- Studio: Yawn, West Kirby, England
- Length: 48:42
- Label: Domino
- Producer: Bill Ryder-Jones

Bill Ryder-Jones chronology
Yawny Yawn (2019)	Iechyd Da (2024)

Iechyd Da is the fifth studio album by English singer-songwriter Bill Ryder-Jones, released on 12 January 2024 through Domino Recording Company. It is his first album in five years, and received acclaim from critics.

== Background ==
The album was produced by Ryder-Jones at his Yawn studio in West Kirby, England. Its title translates as "good health" in Welsh, while the title of the final track, "Nos Da", means "goodnight". Ryder-Jones stated that he has not been "this proud of a record since A Bad Wind Blows in My Heart" and called it his "most produced record".

== Critical reception ==
Professional ratings
Aggregate scores
Source	Rating
AnyDecentMusic?	8.5/10
Metacritic	90/100
Review scores
Source	Rating
AllMusic	4/5 stars
Clash	8/10
DIY	4/5 stars
The Guardian	4/5 stars
The Line of Best Fit	9/10
Mojo	4/5 stars
MusicOMH	4.5/5 stars
NME	5/5 stars
Record Collector	5/5 stars
Uncut	4.5/5 stars

Iechyd Da received a score of 90 out of 100 on review aggregator Metacritic based on eleven critics' reviews, indicating "universal acclaim". Mojo felt that the album "documents a period of intense anguish with careful understatement and smart musical references". Shaun Curran of Record Collector called it "a truly wonderful record, one that embellishes Ryder-Jones' writing in ways both grand and unusual, without sacrificing any of the closeness – his lyrics remain raw and direct – or melodic knack". The Guardian's Dave Simpson described it as "overwhelmingly lovely, with classy hooks and rousing choruses" and remarked that Ryder-Jones's "closely mic-ed voice is fragile, delicate, even on the edge of croaky, giving the impression he's sharing intimacies directly with the listener". Reviewing the album for Uncut, Laura Barton found it to contain "songs marked by a remarkable closeness, by the intimacy of place and people" in "a world filled with colloquialisms and gentle wit, where we were all on first-name terms and the geography sat in our marrow."

=== Year-end lists ===
Select year-end rankings for Iechyd Da
Publication/critic	Accolade	Rank	Ref.
MOJO	The Best Albums Of 2024	5	
Rough Trade UK	Albums of the Year 2024	19	
Uncut	80 Best Albums of 2024	16	

== Track listing ==
All tracks are written by Bill Ryder-Jones, except where noted. All tracks are arranged by Bill Ryder-Jones.

Iechyd Da track listing
No.	Title	Length
1.	"I Know That It's Like This (Baby)" (Bill Ryder-Jones, Caetano Veloso)	4:32
2.	"A Bad Wind Blows in My Heart Pt. 3"	3:57
3.	"If Tomorrow Starts Without Me"	3:06
4.	"We Don't Need Them"	4:55
5.	"I Hold Something in My Hand"	3:04
6.	"This Can't Go On" (Ryder-Jones, William Hines)	4:30
7.	"...And the Sea..."	2:10
8.	"Nothing to Be Done"	4:02
9.	"It's Today Again"	3:33
10.	"Christinha"	4:04
11.	"How Beautiful I Am"	4:18
12.	"Thankfully for Anthony"	4:54
13.	"Nos Da"	1:37
Total length:		48:42

Notes

- "I Know That It's Like This (Baby)" samples "Baby", written by Caetano Veloso, as performed by Gal Costa.

== Personnel ==
- Bill Ryder-Jones – vocals, production, mixing
- Amy Chalmers – violins
- Ian Stephens – cello
- Martin Smith – horns
- Andy Frizell – flute
- Phil Murphy – drums
- Bidston Avenue School Choir
- Guy Davie – mastering
- James Ford – mixing
- Felipe Chapman-Fromm – engineering
- Liam Power – engineering
- Nathaniel Cummings – engineering

== Charts ==
Chart performance for Iechyd Da
Chart (2024)	Peak position
Scottish Albums (OCC)	3
Swiss Albums (Schweizer Hitparade)	69
UK Albums (OCC)	30
UK Independent Albums (OCC)	2
