= Submarine (2010 film) =

2010 film by Richard Ayoade

- Theatrical release poster
- Directed by: Richard Ayoade
- Written by: Richard Ayoade
- Based on: Submarine by Joe Dunthorne
- Produced by: Mary Burke; Mark Herbert; Andy Stebbing
- Starring: Noah Taylor; Paddy Considine; Craig Roberts; Yasmin Paige; Sally Hawkins
- Cinematography: Erik Alexander Wilson
- Edited by: Nick Fenton; Chris Dickens
- Music by: Alex Turner (songs); Andrew Hewitt (original score)
- Production companies: Warp Films; Film4 Productions; UK Film Council; Wales Creative IP Fund; Film Agency for Wales; Protagonist Pictures; Red Hour Films
- Distributed by: Optimum Releasing (United Kingdom); The Weinstein Company (United States)
- Release dates: 12 September 2010 (TIFF); 18 March 2011 (United Kingdom); 3 June 2011 (United States)
- Running time: 97 minutes
- Countries: United Kingdom; United States
- Language: English
- Budget: $1.9 million
- Box office: $4.6 million

Submarine is a 2010 coming-of-age film written and directed by Richard Ayoade in his feature directorial debut. Based on the 2008 novel by Joe Dunthorne, it stars Noah Taylor, Paddy Considine, Craig Roberts, Yasmin Paige, and Sally Hawkins. The film follows an eccentric 15-year-old boy (Roberts) who pursues a relationship with a classmate (Paige) while attempting to repair his parents' marriage, suspecting that his mother (Hawkins) is having an affair with an ex-lover (Considine).

Filming for Submarine began in October 2009, in the towns of Swansea, Cardiff, Rhondda, and Barry. Over the course of seven weeks, the film was primarily shot in Cardiff. Alex Turner, the frontman of the English rock band Arctic Monkeys, was recruited to compose the soundtrack, which was released on 14 March 2011. Submarine premiered at the 35th Toronto International Film Festival on 12 September 2010. It was shortly picked up by The Weinstein Company for a North American release. It was released in the United Kingdom on 18 March 2011, followed shortly by a United States release on 3 June. The film was released onto DVD and Blu-ray on 4 October, with Anchor Bay Entertainment distributing it.

Submarine received generally positive reviews from critics, with many praising the way it was filmed. It grossed $4.6 million worldwide at the box office, against a production budget of $1.9 million. Submarine earned several accolades after its release, including "Best Feature Film" at the 2012 BAFTA Cymru awards. Roberts also received several awards for his performance, including the award for "Young British Performer of the Year" at the 2011 London Film Critics Circle Awards.

== Plot ==
In the Welsh seaside city of Swansea, Oliver Tate is an eccentric, unpopular 15-year-old who is infatuated with his mischievous classmate, Jordana Bevan. After Oliver bullies another female classmate to impress Jordana, she invites him to meet secretly after school, before taking pictures of her and Oliver kissing. Jordana uses the pictures to make her ex-boyfriend Mark jealous, resulting in Oliver being beaten up by Mark at school for refusing to call Jordana a "slut". Jordana becomes Oliver's girlfriend and, after a couple of weeks, they lose their virginity to each other in his bedroom while his parents are out.

Oliver begins to suspect that his mother Jill is having an affair with a previous lover, New Age motivational speaker Graham Purvis, who has moved in next door with his girlfriend Kim-Lin. Worried about his parents' marriage, he monitors their sex life by checking the dimmer switch in their bedroom, concluding that they have not had sex for seven months. After spotting Jill in town with Graham and overhearing her talk about him on the phone, Oliver tries to warn his depressed father Lloyd, who dismisses his suspicions. Oliver spies on Jill attending one of Graham's seminars, where Graham tells her that he has broken up with Kim-Lin.

As Oliver's relationship with Jordana grows, she reveals that her mother has been diagnosed with a life-threatening brain tumour. At an awkward early Christmas dinner at Jordana's house, Oliver is welcomed by her parents but witnesses her father break down emotionally after a dimmer switch stops working. Despite agreeing to visit Jordana's mother at the hospital the day of her operation, Oliver loses his nerve and temporarily disappears from Jordana's life so he can focus on salvaging his parents' marriage, planning to resume his relationship with Jordana afterwards.

On New Year's Eve, Jill goes to the beach with Graham. While searching for Jill on the crowded beach, Oliver is stunned to see Jordana with another boy. He then spies on his mother entering the back of Graham's van and assumes the worst. Enraged, he goes home and takes several of Lloyd's antidepressants before breaking into Graham's house, where he gets drunk and commits minor acts of vandalism. Upon returning home, Graham finds an intoxicated Oliver. Graham later takes Oliver home and leaves. The next morning, Oliver awakes to see that his parents are not angry with him and are reconciling, though Jill admits that she gave Graham a handjob.

Jordana breaks up with Oliver via a letter informing him that she is seeing someone else and that her mother's operation was successful; he becomes depressed over the next few months. At school, Oliver apologises to Jordana for not visiting her mother at the hospital, hoping she will leave her new boyfriend for him, but she rejects him. Oliver later encounters Jordana on the beach at sunset, learning that she does not actually have a new boyfriend. She declares that Oliver was horrible to her, and he admits that he made a mistake. Together, they walk several inches deep into the sea, smiling at each other as the sun shines on them.

== Cast ==
- Noah Taylor as Lloyd Tate, Oliver's father
- Paddy Considine as Graham Purvis, Jill's love affair
- Craig Roberts as Oliver Tate, a high school student and Jordana's boyfriend
- Yasmin Paige as Jordana Bevan, Oliver's girlfriend
- Sally Hawkins as Jill Tate, Oliver's mother
- Darren Evans as Chips, Oliver's toxic friend
- Osian Cai Dulais as Mark Pritchard, Oliver's bully and Jordana's ex-boyfriend
- Steffan Rhodri as Mr Davey, Oliver's teacher
- Gemma Chan as Kim-Lin, Graham's girlfriend
- Melanie Walters as Jude Bevan, Jordana's mother

== Production ==
=== Development and casting ===
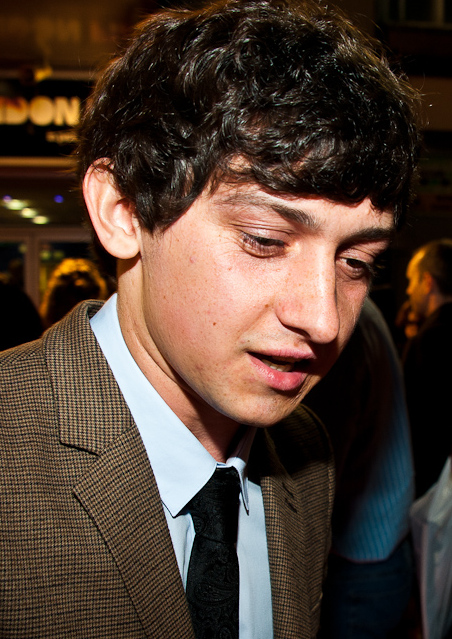
Craig Roberts, who portrayed Oliver Tate in the film, pictured in 2013

In early 2008, Joe Dunthorne, then studying at the University of East Anglia, was searching the internet for new music, when he saw a job advertisement asking for interns to apply at Warp Films. After persuading his roommate, a film student, to apply, he quickly began developing a manuscript of Submarine, before showing it to the manager of Warp Films. Producer Mary Burke quickly optioned the screen rights, with Richard Ayoade directing the screenplay. Dunthorne had published the novel on which the film is based in February 2008. Dunthorne agreed to let Ayoade produce it, writing "I felt like [Ayoade] really connected with the story of Submarine and had a clear vision of what he wanted to do with it". Ayoade has stated it was not written with a particular year in mind, although many critics refer to it taking place in the 1980s. Submarine became Ayoade's feature directorial debut. Ayoade cited several films as influencing the adaptation, including Taxi Driver (1976), Badlands (1973), and Éric Rohmer's Love in the Afternoon (1972).

In 2009, around 100 actors submitted video auditions for the roles of Oliver, Jordana, and Chips. Michael Sheen and X Factor contestant Lucie Jones were originally cast in the film but dropped out due to other commitments. Creative director Virginia Heath stated more than 1,200 people had signed up to the casting site, and more than 100 auditions of "previously undiscovered talent" had been submitted for the roles in the film. Auditions closed on 17 August 2009. Roberts and Paige were cast via online auditions, and Ayoade invited them to record screen tests around Barry Island, where sequences of the film would later be shot. To prepare Roberts for the role of Oliver, Ayoade gave him The Graduate (1967), Harold and Maude (1971), and Taxi Driver to watch.

=== Filming ===
Principal photography began on 26 October 2009, at locations ranging from Swansea, Cardiff, Rhondda, and Barry. Submarine was primarily shot in Cardiff over the course of seven weeks. Ayoade and cinematographer Erik Wilson watched French cinema films from the 1970s for visual references; Wilson listed François Truffaut and Éric Rohmer as primary influences. The film was produced by Warp Films and Film4 Productions, on a production budget of $1.9 million. Submarine was mostly filmed using natural light, and was mainly shot on 35mm film. A second, older 35mm camera was used for some scenic shots, although the crew initially disliked it because it "jumps a bit and is very noisy", however Ayoade insisted on using it. In the scenes where the lighting had to be adjusted, either existing fluorescents were replaced or switched off, or other bulbs were brought in. In an interview with NME magazine in 2021, Paige fondly reflected on the filming experience, stating it was one of the best experiences of her life. The film was dedicated to Ayoade's father, who died during filming of Submarine.

=== Soundtrack ===
"Piledriver Waltz"
A 19-second sample from the sixth song on the soundtrack, "Piledriver Waltz". The soundtrack of Submarine has been described as indie folk, with elements of baroque pop and psychedelic pop throughout it.

Following the release of the English rock band Arctic Monkeys' third studio album, Humbug (2009). Ayoade approached frontman Alex Turner to write the soundtrack. Turner stated that making music for a film was something he felt was not "qualified to do", but said that he made an exception due to his friendship with Ayoade. Turner initially intended to perform cover songs for the film, but ended up writing six original songs. The soundtrack was recorded in April 2010 at One Inch Studios in London, with frequent collaborator James Ford serving as producer. Turner and Ford played most of the instruments, while Bill Ryder-Jones played guitar on the tracks "Hiding Tonight", and "It's Hard To Get Around The Wind". The strings for the song "Piledriver Waltz" were arranged by Owen Pallett, and recorded at Air Studios in London. The original score was composed by Andrew Hewitt, a long-time collaborator of Ayoade, and was recorded at Air Studios with the Composers Ensemble orchestra. The soundtrack was announced on 7 February 2011, and released on 14 March, just a few days before the film made its debut in the United Kingdom. Since its release, several music critics have compared it to the works of Richard Hawley, Bob Dylan, Simon & Garfunkel, John Lennon, Roy Orbison, Scott Walker, and Cat Stevens's soundtrack for Harold and Maude. The original score was released for digital download and streaming on 3 May 2011.

== Themes and other analysis ==
A dominant theme in Submarine is coming-of-age, and is most present within the character of Oliver. In the book The Past in Visual Culture: Essays on Memory, Nostalgia and the Media, writers Jilly Kay, Cat Mahoney, and Caitlin Shaw explained that Submarine "rips off" the visual direction of the 1960s and 1970s, while blending modern aspects of filmmaking to create a "postmodern context". Several elements of the film are inspired by The Graduate and Badlands. Adesola Thomas of Paste found Oliver's character to be craving attention at times, giving an example of when Oliver fantasizes about his classmates mourning his death, likening him to Jesus. Thomas and Matt Goldberg of Collider also drew several comparisons of the film's story structure to Scott Pilgrim vs. the World (2010). Author Neil Mitchell stated that Submarine's exploration of teen angst never falls into self-indulgence because its "surface drama always plays second fiddle to the film's real love story".

== Release ==
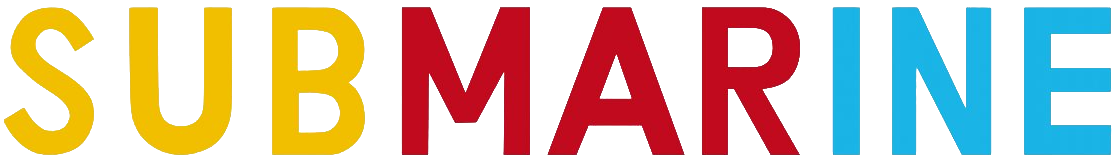
The logo for Submarine

Submarine premiered at the 35th Toronto International Film Festival on 12 September 2010. Following a generally positive reception, distribution rights for the film were bought, for $1 million, by The Weinstein Company for a North American release. The film also played at the 54th London Film Festival in October 2010 and at the 27th Sundance Film Festival in January 2011. It was also screened along with 400 other films at the 61st Berlin International Film Festival the next month. The first theatrical poster was unveiled on 21 January 2011, with Tom DiChiara of MTV considering it "cool". A second poster was revealed on 11 May. The film was officially released in the United Kingdom on 18 March 2011, and released in the United States on 3 June. Submarine had a limited theatrical release, initially playing in only 59 cinemas across the United Kingdom, before entering a wide release soon after due to high ticket demands. It would see a DVD and Blu-ray release on 4 October, with Anchor Bay Entertainment handling distribution. The two discs feature deleted and extended scenes, along with a behind-the-scenes video. The United Kingdom DVD features Through the Prism, a featurette starring Considine as Graham.

== Reception ==
=== Box office ===
Submarine grossed $467,602 in the United States and Canada, along with $4.1 million in other territories, for a worldwide total of $4.6 million. The film earned a total of $41,832 on its opening weekend in the United States, earning a $1,527 per-theater average gross on 11 June 2011. In its second weekend, Submarine finished with $55,848. By its third weekend, the film had surpassed Diary of a Wimpy Kid: Rodrick Rules with $58,291. In its fourth and fifth weekends, it earned $42,103 and $27,232, respectively. By its sixth weekend, Submarine had earned a total of $377,807 domestically. Internationally, the film earned $219,292 in Australia, $154,526 in France, $131,913 in Germany, and over $2 million in the United Kingdom. In its final week in August 2011, it concluded with $3,196.

=== Critical reception and legacy ===
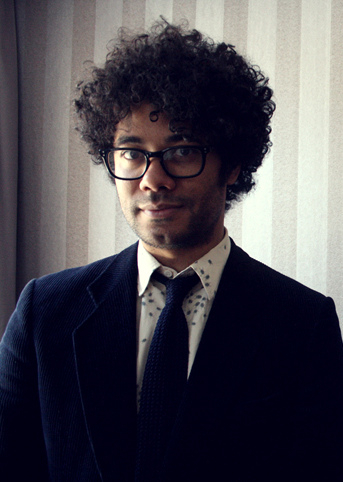
Many critics praised Richard Ayoade's directing style (pictured in 2011).

Submarine received generally positive reviews from critics. On the review aggregator website Rotten Tomatoes, the film holds an approval rating of 88% based on 156 reviews, with an average rating of 7.4/10. The website's critics consensus reads, "Funny, stylish, and ringing with adolescent truth, Submarine marks Richard Ayoade as a talent to watch." Metacritic, which uses a weighted average, assigned the film a score of 76 out of 100, based on 37 critics, indicating "generally favorable" reviews.

Critic Roger Ebert gave it a positive review, saying, "It flaunts some stylistic devices, such as titles and sections and self-aware narration, but it doesn't try too hard to be desperately clever. It's a self-confident work for the first-time director." Noel Murray of The A.V. Club praised the film for the way it was shot, explaining, "Submarine is funny and stylish, shot in a way that gives the recent past an archaic glow, as though lit by candlelight and the setting sun." Ray Bennett, writing for The Hollywood Reporter, called the film "Jaunty and sly with great many laughs". Dan Jolin of Empire gave the film a four out of five stars, stating "Submarine is, simply, a joy. A joy jostled by the comedy of discomfort." Sharon Waxman of TheWrap compared Submarine to other films such as Little Miss Sunshine (2006), and Bottle Rocket (1996). The American actor Jesse Eisenberg has cited Submarine as one of his favourite films of all time. However, Owen Gleiberman of Entertainment Weekly gave the film a 'C' rating, calling it "self-conscious".

Sophie Williams of The Guardian cites the film as her feel-good movie, writing "It was during this state of unrest that Richard Ayoade's Submarine waltzed into my world. It might be a curious choice to name a film that traverses a troubled home life, too-much-too-young sexual experiences, and bullying as my feel-good movie, but within its equally dark and peppy 97 minutes is a story about writing your own rules." Peter Bradshaw, also writing for The Guardian, found it funny and sweet in his review, and also cited Ayoade as a "tremendous new voice in British film". Additionally, Peter Debruge of Variety praised the film for how well it stands out in its genre, writing, "Submarine rises above the genre's tired, cookie-cutter competition, presenting familiar elements, such as preternaturally articulate teens preoccupied with virginity, through fresh eyes." Goldberg praised the film for its visual style, writing "Submarine is a must-see film that will make you laugh, [and] dazzle you with its visual prowess".

Since its release, Submarine has been considered a cult classic amongst viewers. In a retrospective marking the film's tenth anniversary, Williams, writing for NME, credited it with helping to set the tone for subsequent British coming-of-age comedies, citing works such as Sing Street (2016) and The End of the F***ing World (2017–2019) as later examples of this trend. The film also had a significant impact on the career of Roberts, who later became a writer and director. Roberts credited Ayoade's direction on Submarine as a major influence on his subsequent filmmaking career, saying that the experience "opened [his] eyes to cinema". Roberts has similarly described Submarine as his first significant film experience, and said that he learned extensively from Ayoade while later developing his own directorial work.

=== Accolades ===
Submarine was nominated for and won multiple awards from numerous film organizations and festivals. It was nominated for five British Independent Film Awards, and was awarded one at the 2011 British Independent Film Awards, with Ayoade receiving the award for "Best Screenplay". Ayoade was also nominated for the Douglas Hickox Award, but lost to Tyrannosaur (2011). Additionally, Hawkins was nominated for "Best Supporting Actress", along with Roberts and Paige being nominated for "Most Promising Newcomer".

At the 65th British Academy Film Awards, Ayoade was nominated for the "Outstanding Debut" award. In addition, producers Mary Burke, Mark Herbert, and Andy Stebbing won the award for "Best Feature Film" at the BAFTA Cymru awards in 2012, with Roberts also receiving the award for "Best Actor". Roberts also won the award for "Young British Performer of the Year" at the 2011 London Film Critics Circle Awards. The Giffoni Film Festival awarded the film the "Jury Grand Prix" award in 2011, and Ayoade was nominated "Most Promising Newcomer" at the 2012 Evening Standard British Film Awards for his direction.
