= Detachment =

Detachment or detached may refer to:

- Single-family detached home, a structure maintained and used as a single dwelling unit.
- Emotional detachment, in psychology, refers to "inability to connect" or "mental assertiveness"
- Detachment (philosophy), the state of lacking desire or emotional attachment to material things, people or worldly affairs
- Detachment (military), a military unit which has left its parent unit altogether
- Detachment (territory), a concept in international law
- A term used in the United Kingdom for an enclave and exclave
- Detachment fault, geological term associated with large displacements
- Décollement, a geological term for a zone where rock units are detached from each other
- Detachment (film), a 2011 American film by British director Tony Kaye
- Detachments (British band), an English art rock/electronic group
- Detached objects, objects which have orbits whose perihelia are sufficiently distant from the influence of Neptune so that they are only moderately affected by Neptune.
- Detachment in personality disorder or personality difficulty, a psychiatric trait diagnosis in the ICD-11

== See also ==
- Retinal detachment, a disorder of the retina
- Rule of detachment
- Law of detachment
