= The Hum (James Ford album) =

Studio album by James Ford
- Released: 12 May 2023
- Length: 43:17
- Label: Warp

Singles from The Hum
- 1. "I Never Wanted Anything" Released: 2 March 2023; 2. "Squeaky Wheel" Released: 5 April 2023; 3. "The Yips" Released: 10 May 2023

The Hum is the debut studio album by the English musician James Ford. It was released on 12 May 2023, through Warp Records.

== Track listing ==
No.	Title	Length
1.	"Tape Loop #7"	4:40
2.	"Pillow Village"	5:20
3.	"I Never Wanted Anything"	5:09
4.	"Squeaky Wheel"	3:19
5.	"The Yips"	4:42
6.	"Golden Hour"	3:57
7.	"The Hum"	2:32
8.	"Caterpillar"	5:01
9.	"Emptiness"	4:10
10.	"Closing Time"	5:27
Total length:		43:17
