= The Bright Lights and What I Should Have Learned =

Studio album by Duels
- Released: 31 July 2006 (UK)
- Genre: Glam pop
- Length: 43:55
- Label: Nude
- Producer: James Ford

Duels chronology
| The Bright Lights and What I Should Have Learned (2006) | The Barbarians Move In (2008) |

Professional ratings
Review scores
| Source | Rating |
|---|---|
| NME | link |
| The Sunday Times | 4/5 stars |
| This Is Fake DIY | link |
| The Guardian | link |

The Bright Lights and What I Should Have Learned is the debut album by Duels released July 2006. It was released as a standard edition and limited-edition version in a deluxe embossed box.

It received a positive review in the New Musical Express (NME), garnering an 8/10 review score, 4/5 in Clash magazine, 4 stars in Time Out and was named Album of the Week in The Sunday Times, The Guardian and on XFM.

== Track listing ==
1. "Brothers and Sisters" – 3:51
2. "Things" – 4:15
3. "Potential Futures" – 3:34
4. "The Slow Build" – 5:15
5. "The Monsters Are Loose" – 4:10
6. "Animal" – 3:08
7. "What We Did Wrong" – 4:09
8. "Pressure on You" – 2:42
9. "Young Believers" – 5:05
10. "Once in the Night" – 3:38
11. "Taxi Song" – 4:04

== Personnel ==
Mixed by James Ford, Duels & Dave Sardy
