= The Barbarians Move In =

Studio album by Duels
- Released: 14 February 2008 (UK)
- Genre: Indie
- Length: 44:20
- Label: This Is Fake DIY Records
- Producer: Duels

Duels chronology
The Bright Lights and What I Should Have Learned (2006)	The Barbarians Move In (2008)

Professional ratings
Review scores
Source	Rating
AngryApe	(very positive)
The Guardian	4/5 stars
Leeds Music Scene	4.5/5 stars
NME	(8/10) (04/26/2008, p.36)
Q Magazine	4/5 stars
Whisperin' and Hollerin'	9/10 stars

The Barbarians Move In is the second album by Duels. It was released for digital download on 14 February 2008 followed by a physical release in April 2008 on This Is Fake DIY Records. It was produced, engineered and mixed by the band themselves.

== Track listing ==
1. "The Furies"
2. "Sleeping Giants"
3. "Regeneration"
4. "Perimeter Fence"
5. "The Healing"
6. "Wolvesland"
7. "The Wild Hunt"
8. "This Year's Man"
9. "Forgotten Babies"
10. "The First Time/The Last Time"
11. "The Barbarians Move In"

== Singles ==
- "Regeneration" (April 2008)
