= James Ford (musician) =

English composer, musician, and record producer

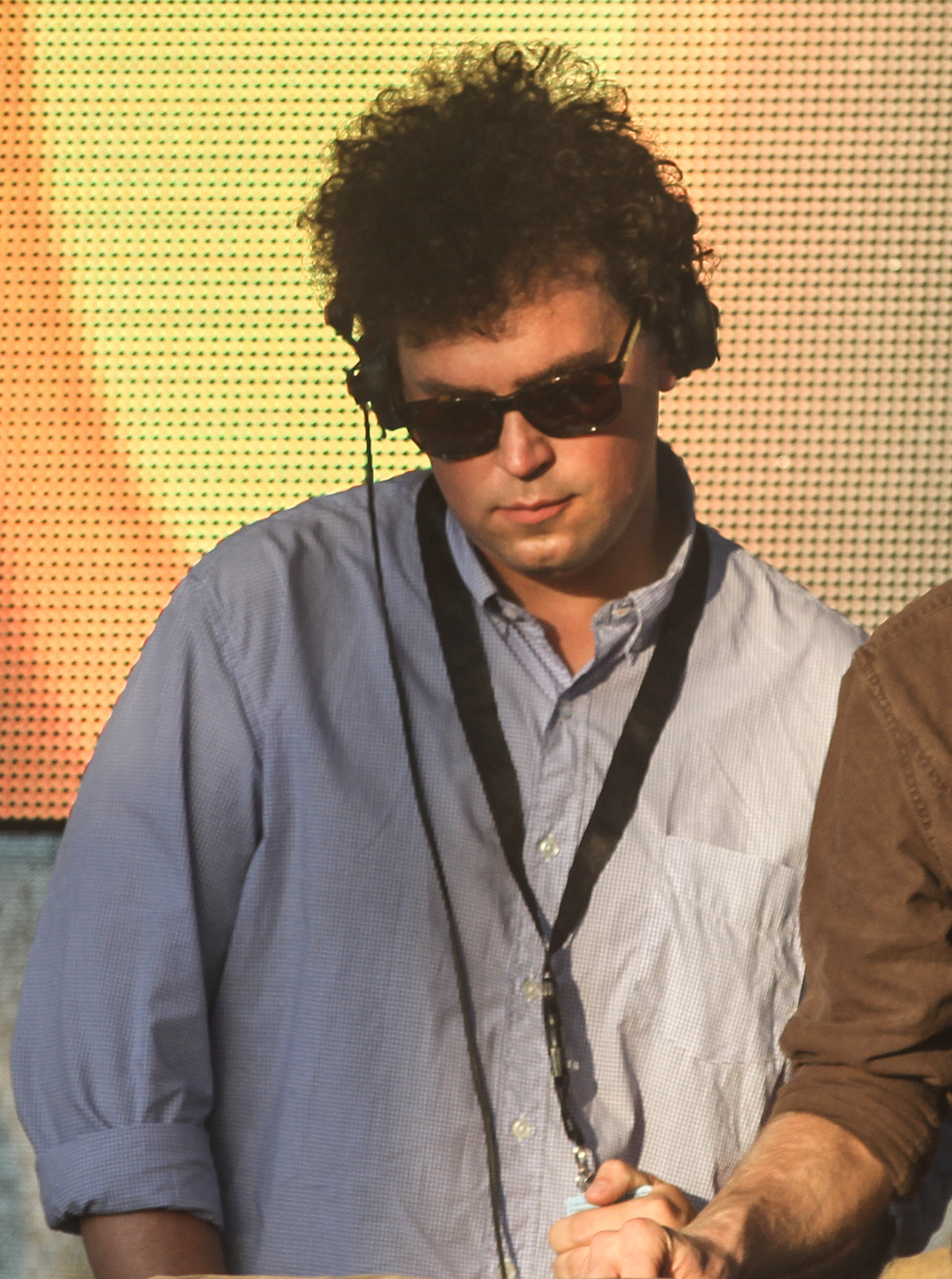
- James Ford during Melt! Festival 2013

Background information
- Born: James Ellis Ford; 11 December 1978 (age 47); Leek, Staffordshire, England
- Genres: Synth-pop; indie rock; indie pop
- Occupations: Record producer; songwriter; remixer
- Instruments: Drums; percussion; keyboards; bass; guitar
- Years active: 2000–present
- Label: Warp
- Member of: Simian Mobile Disco; The Last Shadow Puppets
- Formerly of: Simian
- Website: jamesellisford.com

James Ellis Ford (born 11 December 1978) is an English record producer and songwriter, known for being a member of Simian Mobile Disco and the Last Shadow Puppets as well as his production work with Arctic Monkeys, Blur, Declan McKenna, Depeche Mode, Foals, Fontaines D.C., Florence and the Machine, Geese, Gorillaz, Haim, Jessie Ware, Kylie Minogue, Klaxons, The Last Dinner Party, the Pet Shop Boys and Pulp.

In 2023 he released a solo album The Hum on Warp Records. Ford's second solo album, Lost In Another World, was released in August 2026 and was written and recorded while Ford battled acute myeloid leukemia.

== Biography ==
James Ellis Ford was born on 11 December 1978 in Staffordshire. Ford went to Manchester University, along with other members of Simian. He studied biology and graduated with a lower second-class honours degree in 2002.

Ford's influences included Ryuichi Sakamoto, the Pet Shop Boys, Orchestral Manoeuvres in the Dark, and Erlend Øye. He became a founding member of the group Simian and later a member of the spin-off duo Simian Mobile Disco.

He produced the Klaxons album Myths of the Near Future in 2007 which won the Mercury Prize. Also that year, he produced the Arctic Monkeys second album. He has done at least part of the production on each of the band's subsequent albums.

In 2008, he formed the Last Shadow Puppets with Miles Kane and Alex Turner, as both drummer and producer. Their debut album, The Age of the Understatement, earned the group a Mercury Prize nomination and also charted at No. 1 in the UK. Their second album, Everything You've Come to Expect, was released in 2016. Ford once again produced, also playing drums, percussion and keys. The record earned the group their second UK No. 1.

Ford produced and played keys and tambourine on Arctic Monkeys' fifth album, AM, released in 2013.

Ford produced Depeche Mode's 14th studio album Spirit released on 17 March 2017 as well as their 15th studio album Memento Mori, which was released on 24 March 2023. He also produced the fourth studio album of the UK band Everything Everything under the title A Fever Dream, released on 18 August 2017.

In 2018, Ford co-produced the Arctic Monkeys' sixth studio album Tranquility Base Hotel & Casino, as well as Gorillaz' sixth studio album The Now Now.

On 14 March 2023, it was announced he would be producing Pet Shop Boys' new album. He produced the Last Dinner Party's first single "Nothing Matters", which was released in April 2023. He co-produced Fat Dog's debut single "King of the Slugs" with the band's lead singer Joe Love, which was released on 21 August 2023. Ford also produced Blur's ninth studio album, The Ballad of Darren, released in July 2023.

In 2024 Ford produced The Last Dinner Party's debut album Prelude to Ecstasy and Fontaines D.C.'s fourth studio album Romance.

In 2025 Ford produced Black Country, New Road’s third studio album Forever Howlong.

== Discography ==
See Discography: Simian & Simian Mobile Disco

=== Studio albums ===
- The Hum (2023) (Warp Records)
- Lost In Another World (2026) (Domino Recording Co.)

== Production ==
- Fingathing – And the Big Red Nebula Band (co-producer; 2004)
- Garden – Round & Round (2005)
- Test Icicles – For Screening Purposes Only (2005)
- Absentee – Schmotime (2006)
- Duels – The Bright Lights and What I Should Have Learned (2006)
- Mystery Jets – Making Dens (2006)
- Arctic Monkeys – Favourite Worst Nightmare (co-produced with Mike Crossey; 2007)
- The Bumblebeez – Prince Umberto & The Sister of Ill (2007)
- Klaxons – Myths of the Near Future (2007)
- The Lodger – Grown-Ups (2007)
- The Last Shadow Puppets – The Age of the Understatement (2008)
- Florence and the Machine – Lungs (4 tracks; co-produced with Paul Epworth, Charlie Hugall, Stephen Mackey and Eg White; 2009)
- Peaches – I Feel Cream (2009)
- Arctic Monkeys – Humbug (3 tracks; co-produced with Josh Homme; 2009)
- Crocodiles – Sleep Forever (2010)
- Detachments – Detachments (2010)
- Chrome Hoof – Crush Depth (2010)
- Alex Turner – Submarine EP (2011)
- Beth Ditto – Beth Ditto EP (2011)
- Arctic Monkeys – Suck It and See (2011)
- Birdy – Birdy (2011)
- Florence and the Machine – Ceremonials (2011)
- Little Boots – Nocturnes (2013)
- Bill Ryder-Jones – A Bad Wind Blows in My Heart (additional production; 2013)
- Arctic Monkeys – AM (11 tracks; co-produced with Ross Orton; 2013)
- Haim – Days Are Gone (2 tracks; co-produced with Ludwig Göransson, Haim and Ariel Rechtshaid; 2013)
- Jessie Ware – Tough Love (2014)
- Mumford & Sons – Wilder Mind (2015)
- Damian Lazarus & The Ancient Moons – Message from the Other Side (2015)
- Foals – What Went Down (2015)
- Florence and the Machine – How Big, How Blue, How Beautiful (2015)
- Bill Ryder-Jones – West Kirby County Primary (additional production; 2015)
- The Last Shadow Puppets – Everything You've Come to Expect (2016)
- Alexandra Savior – Belladonna of Sadness (co-produced with Alex Turner); (2017)
- Depeche Mode – Spirit (2017)
- Little Dragon – Season High (additional production; 2017)
- Methyl Ethel – Everything Is Forgotten (co-produced with Jake Webb) (2017)
- Shock Machine – Shock Machine (2017)
- Declan McKenna – What Do You Think About the Car? (2017)
- Everything Everything – A Fever Dream (2017)
- Arctic Monkeys – Tranquility Base Hotel & Casino (co-produced with Alex Turner; 2018)
- Gorillaz – The Now Now (co-produced with Damon Albarn; 2018)
- Matthew Dear – Bunny (1 track, co-produced with Jas Shaw; 2018)
- Florence and the Machine – Moderation (non-album single, co-produced with Matthew Daniel Siskin; 2019)
- Friendly Fires – Inflorescent (2 tracks, one co-produced with Mark Ralph; 2019)
- Foals – Everything Not Saved Will Be Lost – Part 1 (additional production; 2019)
- Foals – Everything Not Saved Will Be Lost – Part 2 (additional production; 2019)
- Jessie Ware – What's Your Pleasure? (11 tracks out of 12; 4 co-produced; 2020)
- Gorillaz – Song Machine, Season One: Strange Timez (3 tracks co-produced; 2020)
- Shame – Drunk Tank Pink (2021)
- Kylie Minogue – Disco: Guest List Edition (2021)
- Birdy – Young Heart (4 tracks; 2021)
- Arctic Monkeys – The Car (2022)
- The WAEVE – The WAEVE (2023)
- Depeche Mode – Memento Mori (2023)
- Jessie Ware – That! Feels Good! (6 tracks; 2023)
- Geese – 3D Country (2023)
- Blur – The Ballad of Darren (2023)
- Bill Ryder-Jones – Iechyd Da (mixing; 2024)
- The Last Dinner Party – Prelude to Ecstasy (2024)
- Pet Shop Boys – Nonetheless (2024)
- Beth Gibbons – Lives Outgrown (2024)
- The WAEVE – City Lights (2024)
- Moon Diagrams – Cemetery Classics (2024)
- Fontaines D.C. – Romance (2024)
- Black Country, New Road – Forever Howlong (2025)
- Pulp – More (2025)
- Verlo – Générique (EP) (2025)
- Gorillaz – The Mountain (co-producer; 2026)
- War Child – Help(2) (2026)
- Nia Archives – Emotional Junglist (2026)
- Fontaines D.C. – Dopamine Chamber (2026)
