= Hooton Tennis Club =

British rock band

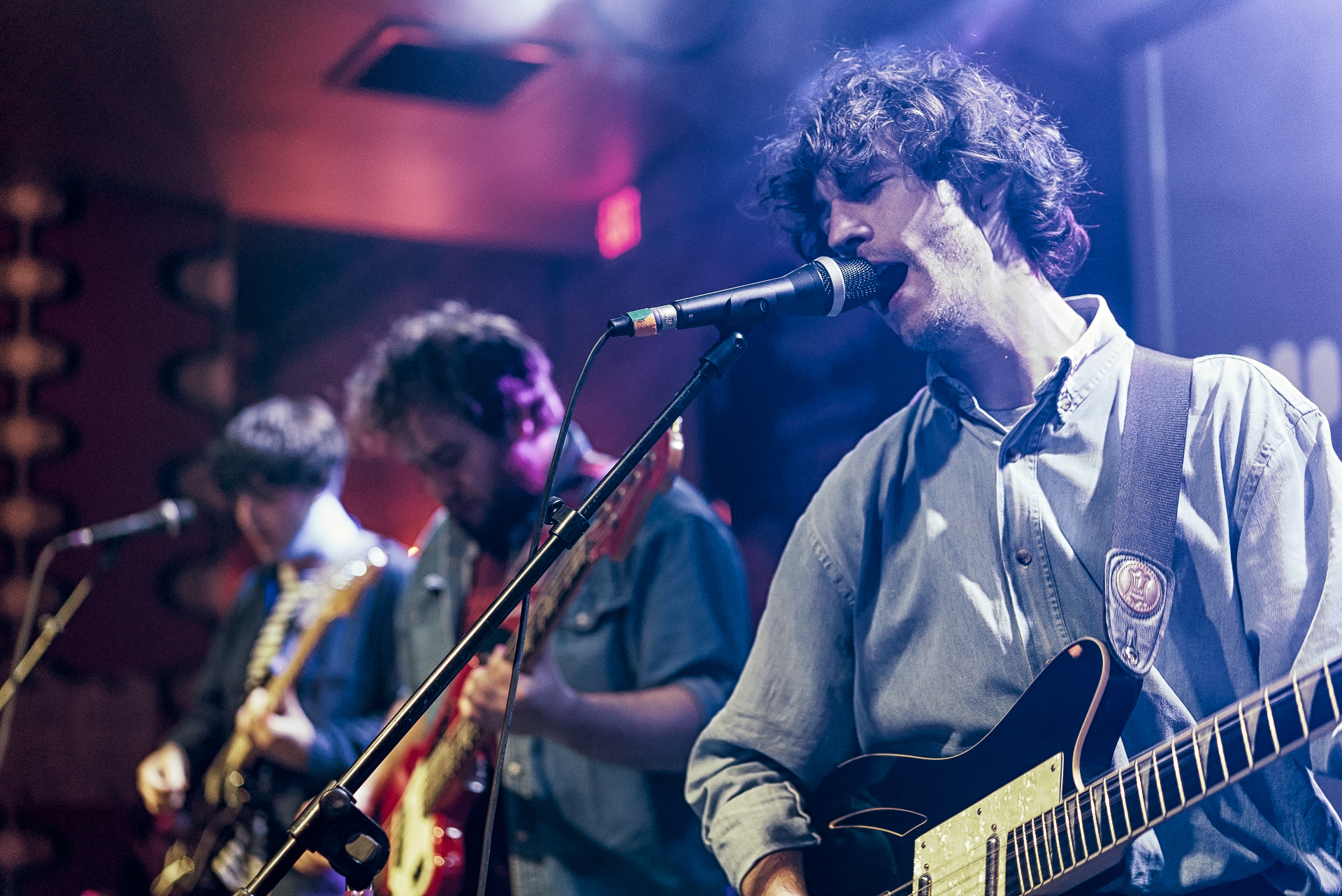

Background information
- Origin: Wirral, England
- Genres: Indie rock, noise pop, garage rock, jangle pop
- Years active: 2013–2016; 2020–present
- Label: Heavenly Records
- Members: Ryan Murphy; James Madden; Callum McFadden; Harry Chalmers
- Website: www.heavenlyrecordings.com/author/hooton-tennis-club/

Hooton Tennis Club is a four-piece indie-rock band from the Wirral consisting of Ryan Murphy (vocals/guitar), James Madden (vocals/guitar), Callum McFadden (bass) and Harry Chalmers (drums) formed in 2013. They were signed to Heavenly Recordings and released two albums and a number of singles. They are now signed to Alcopop! Records.

== History ==
The band members first met at Upton by Chester High School, although Madden and McFadden had known each other prior to that at primary school. Towards the end of 2013 the four began to write songs together. In January 2014 they were featured by Dave Monks on his BBC Introducing show in Merseyside, after which they were picked up by the not-for-profit The Label Recordings based at Edge Hill University. They recorded a four-track EP I Was a Punk in Europe (But My Mum Didn’t Mind), which was described as "trash-indie psychedelic". In September 2014 it was announced that the band had signed with Heavenly Recordings. In February 2015 they released their first single "Jasper/Standing Knees". It was followed by second single, "Kathleen Sat On The Arm Of Her Favourite Chair". Their debut album Highest Point In Cliff Town was produced by Bill Ryder-Jones. The name of the band was taken from a tennis courts in Little Sutton. The band played a headlining tour around the UK and Europe in support of the album.

The band recorded their second album, Big Box of Chocolates at Edwyn Collins' Helmsdale studio in the spring of 2016. The album was released 21 October 2016. The first single from the album is "Katy-Anne Bellis". Singer Madden noted that with the album the band attempted to "come out of the sloppy slacker tag".

Until 2024, the band were on an indefinite hiatus, but announced shows throughout 2024, and are set to play Truck Festival, in Oxfordshire, UK, in 2025. They also signed to Alcopop! Records and released a new single "Born, Died" in November 2024.

== Discography ==
=== Albums ===
- Highest Point in Cliff Town (2015, Heavenly Recordings)
- Big Box of Chocolates (2016, Heavenly Recordings)

=== EPs ===
- Long-Barrelled Saturday (2013)
- I Was a Punk in Europe (But My Mum Didn’t Mind) (2013)
- Oh Phantom, Please Don't! (2014, as "Hootin' Terrors Klub")

=== Singles ===
- "Jasper" (2015)
- "Standing Knees" (2015)
- "Kathleen Sat on the Arm of Her Favourite Chair" (2015)
- "P.O.W.E.R.F.U.L. P.I.E.R.R.E." (2015)
- "Barstool Blues" (by Neil Young) (split with The Wytches) (2015)
- "Katy-Anne Bellis" (2016)
- "Bootcut Jimmy the G" (2016)
- "O Man, Won't You Melt Me?" (2016)
- "Monsoonal Runoff" (2020)
- "Born, Died" (2024)
