= Detachments (British band) =

English rock band

- Origin: London, England
- Genres: Post-punk revival, New Coldwave, Minimal Wave, Synthwave, Industrial, Haunted House, Synth-pop, Art rock, Dark wave
- Years active: 2008–present
- Labels: ThisIsNotAnExit Records, Hacienda Records, Young & Cold Records
- Members: Bastien Marshal (Vocals/Guitar/keyboards) + detachable musicians.
- Website: detachments.bigcartel.com

Detachments are a London-based, post-punk influenced art rock/electronic group led by Blackpool raised Bastien Marshal (Manchester born). They were signed by Thisisnotanexit Records in 2008. Their sound has been compared to that of New Wave music of the late 1970s and early 1980s, such as New Order, OMD and The Cure.

== History ==
Detachments' vocalist, Bastien Marshal, has stated that he listened to New Order, Joy Division, The Cure, and Depeche Mode in his early teens, and that they became major influences on his musical style. He moved from Lancashire to London and worked as a graphics designer for six years, a job which he found to be too routine and boring. He quit his job after starting an electronic band called R3mote. He said that he sent a demo CD to Andrew Weatherall who signed them to Rotters Golf Club, the six track Remotion EP received significant critical acclaim in the electronic dance music press.

After meetings with Universal Music Group broke down, Marshal decided to abandon R3mote and start a new, more live-based band called Detachments. He says that much of Detachments' eponymous album is inspired by his distaste for the corporate work environment and the angst he feels towards how people tend to lose the ideals they held as youths when they become indoctrinated into ordinary working lifestyles.

Their official debut single was The Flowers That Fell (released 2009). Their second single Circles was produced by James Ford and accompanied by H.A.L. produced by Andrew Weatherall. The package includes several acclaimed remixes including the Round&Round Mix by Dubstep pioneer Martyn which is featured on the Fabric 50 compilation.

With its Nouveau Minimal Wave and Cold Wave sound, Detachments' ensuing eponymous debut album (produced by James Ford) found them an international cult following. The album is steeped with existential undertones and an austere, dystopian outlook. 2014 saw the release of the Endgame EP which received critical acclaim from the likes of Music Week, Spindle and Clash Magazine (Track of the Day). In 2018, the German label Young & Cold Records unveiled Detachments' Chain of Command EP. The group continues to perform across Europe.

=== Collaborations ===
James Ford (of Simian Mobile Disco) and Peter Hook (of Joy Division and New Order) have both collaborated with Detachments. Peter Hook joined Detachments onstage playing bass with the band for Salford Foundation Trust – Tony Wilson Awards, which led to the release of the Fade EP on Hacienda Records in 2012. In 2019 and 2022 Bastien Marshal performed lead vocals on several songs for Peter Hook's Joy Division Orchestrated at iconic venues including London's Royal Albert Hall and Sydney Opera House.

== Awards and recognition ==
The limited edition 12" release Fear No Fear received positive reviews including earning "Single of the Day" in a Times review by Trevor Jackson, who liked what he heard so much that he later went on to produce Messages and The Flowers That Fell.

The Flowers That Fell was named "Single of the Week" for the week of April 27, 2009 by Drowned in Sound. It also achieved NME Radio A-List status, and BBC Radio 1 Alternative Single of The Week on Steve Lamacq's in New Music We Trust show, the track also featured at number 3 in NME magazine's 10 Tracks You Have To Hear feature.

In 2010 The Guardian columnist Paul Lester nominated Detachments for Best New Bands of 2010 where they sat at the top of the list.

== Discography ==
=== Albums ===
- Detachments (Oct 2010) (CD/LP/download album – released in various countries through ThisIsNotAnExit Records)
- Lost Patrols (Sept 2015) (CD/download album of lost tracks)

=== Singles ===
- Fear No Fear (ltd edition 12") 2008, produced by Sebastien Marshal
- The Flowers That Fell, 2009, produced by Trevor Jackson
- Circles, 2009, produced by James Ford
- HAL /Sands of Time (featuring Heather Marlett from Salem), 2010, produced by James Ford/Sebastien Marshal
- Holiday Romance, 2011, produced by James Ford
- Fade EP, 2012, produced by Sebastien Marshal
- Endgame/The Promenade, 2014, produced by Eddie Casula/Bastien Marshal
- Chain of Command EP, 2018, produced by Eddie Casula/Bastien Marshal

=== Compilation appearances ===
- This is Not An Exit – Manifesto #1 – featuring "Messages" (TINAE)
- Fabric 50 – featuring "Circles" (Fabric)
- Ceremony - A New Order Tribute featuring "Perfect Kiss" and "Mr Disco" (24 Hour Service Station)
- Bill Brewster – LateNightTales Presents After Dark: Nightshift featuring "Flowers That Fell" (Night Time Stories Ltd) 2014
- Artificial Selections 2 featuring "St Lights" (Chromatin Records) 2015
- Young & Cold Sampler featuring "Guilty Party" (Young & Cold Records) 2019
