= Yawn (album) =

Studio album by Bill Ryder-Jones
- Released: 2 November 2018
- Length: 52:26
- Label: Domino
- Producer: Bill Ryder-Jones

Bill Ryder-Jones chronology
West Kirby County Primary (2015)	Yawn (2018)	Yawny Yawn (2019)

Yawn is the fourth studio album by English singer-songwriter Bill Ryder-Jones. It was released on 2 November 2018, by Domino Recording Company.

== Release ==
On 21 August 2018, Ryder-Jones announced the release of his fourth studio album, along with the single "Mither". The music video to the single was directed by James Slater, and shows Ryder-Jones performing in a factory. In a press release, Bill said of the album:

"Yawn is an album that looks for understanding - down the back of life's sofa. These are everyday stories about situations we all fall from and into, out of, and back up against the wall again - and they are sung to us, up close, by a voice still in hock to a few uncomfortable truths."

The second single "And Then There's You" was released on 5 September 2018.

A reworked version of the album titled Yawny Yawn, featuring only vocals and piano, was released in 2019.

== Critical reception ==
Professional ratings
Aggregate scores
Source	Rating
AnyDecentMusic?	7.7/10
Metacritic	81/100
Review scores
Source	Rating
AllMusic	3.5/5 stars
DIY	3/5 stars
The Guardian	5/5 stars
The Line of Best Fit	8.5/10

Yawn was met with "universal acclaim" reviews from critics. At Metacritic, which assigns a weighted average rating out of 100 to reviews from mainstream publications, this release received an average score of 81 based on 12 reviews.

Timothy Monger of AllMusic explained the release "takes the form of gently melodic and sometimes noisy slowcore guitar rock, its slow dreamy grooves punctuated with squalls of distortion and grainy textures. Yawn has its moments of beauty and craft, but the payoffs are so subtle and slow to arrive that its title becomes the regrettably inevitable reaction." Sarah Pope of DIY gave the release three stars out of five, explaining that the albums "10 tracks all sprawl along at a similar down-tempo pace, Bill's fragile whisper of a croon only adding to the aura of lethargic night times spent alone."

== Track listing ==
Yawn track listing
No.	Title	Length
1.	"There's Something on Your Mind"	5:04
2.	"Time Will Be the Only Saviour"	5:52
3.	"Recover"	3:35
4.	"Mither"	6:08
5.	"And Then There's You"	4:35
6.	"There Are Worse Things I Could Do"	5:17
7.	"Don't Be Scared, I Love You"	4:17
8.	"John"	4:38
9.	"No One's Trying to Kill You"	6:22
10.	"Happy Song"	6:38

== Personnel ==
Musicians

- Bill Ryder-Jones – primary artist, producer
- Rod Skipp – cello
- Phil Murphy – drums
- Naomi Mann – backing vocals
- Esme Hand-Halford – backing vocals
- Sidonie Hand-Halford – backing vocals

Production

- Rich Hurst – engineer
- Liam Power – engineer
- Alex Quinn – engineer
- Charlotte Sutcliffe – engineer
- Jay Leahey – engineer
- Craig Silvey – mixing
- Guy Davie – mastering
- Paul Briggs – design

== Charts ==
Chart performance for Yawn
Chart (2018)	Peak position
Scottish Albums (OCC)	58
UK Albums (OCC)	57
UK Independent Albums (OCC)	7
