= A Bad Wind Blows in My Heart =

Studio album by English musician Bill Ryder-Jones

Studio album by Bill Ryder-Jones
- Released: 8 April 2013
- Genre: Indie rock
- Length: 48:00
- Label: Domino
- Producer: Bill Ryder-Jones, James Ford (add.), Darren Jones (add.)

Bill Ryder-Jones chronology
If... (2011)	A Bad Wind Blows in My Heart (2013)	Piggy Soundtrack (2013)

A Bad Wind Blows in My Heart is the second studio album by English musician Bill Ryder-Jones. It was released in April 2013 under Domino Records.

== Background ==
Ryder-Jones recorded the album in an upstairs bedroom of his mother's house in Liverpool, England, with members of By the Sea as the backing band. The recordings were produced by Ryder-Jones himself, while it was mixed by James Ford and Darren Jones

== Music and lyrics ==
James Christopher Monger of Allmusic described the album as an "equally evocative, yet more traditional collection of songs that suggest what Nick Drake might have sounded like had he emerged in the early oughts instead of the late '60s." In addition, Monger felt that the release "never feels like a self-absorbed, autobiographical bore, as Jones' is an enigmatic enough narrator and a gifted enough arranger that what initially seems like ephemera turns out to be surprisingly affecting." At The Fly, Edward Devlin wrote that Ryder-Jones is "a skilled arranger with a keen eye for detail. This surprisingly assured collection of songs sounds like the work of a seasoned songwriter." Barry Nicolson of NME said that the effort is "not maudlin or cynical, but often quite comical", and noted that the music is being "delivered in a hushed, semi-spoken voice that frequently sounds like it’s trying to slunk out of the musical foreground. Once you’ve accustomed yourself to the sedate pace, something haunting, stately and – in a small-scale, arthousey sort of way – cinematic gradually reveals itself." The area of production was touched on by In Your Speakers' Theresa Flanagan who wrote that Ryder-Jones is "a well-seasoned veteran of the music industry and it shows in the well-crafted production, not so much in his genuinely humble affect." At Q, James Oldham highlighted that the album is "melancholic, tauntly-arranged and given warmth by Arctic Monkeys collaborator James Ford's sparse production".

At musicOMH, Martin Headon wrote that "there's more than enough here to establish Ryder-Jones as a serious solo artist – all it needs is one more notch on the self-confidence dial, and that potential could translate into astounding results." Soundblab's Dan Clay told that the listener "leave[s] [...] feeling fully immersed, satisfied and impressed." This Is Fake DIY's Johnny Owen told that "while his vocal delivery sounds as though he’s having to force each word out through cracked lips at the end of a long night, the accompanying music fits perfectly" because it contains "a certain world-worn raggedness." At The 405, Mike Emerson felt that "the album could do with a couple more stand out moments both musically and vocally, however, as far as singer-songwriter albums go, this one stands out a mile." Furthermore, Emerson told that "the straight forward nature of the album doesn't do it any harm whatsoever, yet a lack of any major shift in tempo doesn't do it many favours", and that the truthfulness "really connects, and when distributed with such a softly spoken vocal the songs don't struggle to become quite hypnotising." Dean Van Nguyen of Pitchork wrote that Ryder-Jones "vocal is dulled and rasping throughout, and the songs never blossom like those on If..., seemingly hamstrung by his limited range." At the Metro, Amy Rose Dawson felt that the album "showcase[s] [...] more conventional songwriting in the indie folk vein, big on delicate guitar strumming and pretty piano chords."

In terms of lyrics, Devin evoked that "the cathartic lyrics paint vivid pictures and emotional scenes throughout, while the grandeur of the compositions and stirring melodies lift the confessional bedroom ballads from potential despair to salvation." Headon felt that Ryder-Jones "skills as an songwriter and arranger are clearly evident – each song builds with subtlety and restraint, and there’s a neat rhythmic twist halfway through Anthony & Owen that brings his former band to mind." Owen told that Ryder-Jones "resides firmly in singer-songwriter territory, occupying a space somewhere between fellow Domino alumni Elliott Smith and Bill Callahan." Emerson wrote that "there are soft guitars meandering slowly through gracious flows of percussion, as drifts of piano keys wash over the surface. Hushed, and often heartbreaking lyrics are ushered into proceedings and at first, everything seems quite basic. After a few plays of the album, you begin to appreciate the beauty of the arrangements, and realise that the structure of these tracks is undoubtedly the reason for their success." In addition, Emerson said that the album "takes somewhat of a step backwards in complexity, albeit with more overall components involved. It's more of a back to basics singer-songwriter album, put together with a 20/20 eye for composition." Van Nguyen noted how "If...'s more sweeping arrangements, playing to Ryder-Jones’s strengths, which are not insignificant, if sadly underused here." Dawson told that "the lyrics are very personal but pleasingly subtle, and Ryder-Jones can write a nice tune, but the whole thing starts to drift into one after a few tracks."

== Critical reception ==
Professional ratings
Review scores
Source	Rating
Allmusic	4/5 stars
The Fly	4/5 stars
Metro	3/5 stars
Mojo	4/5 stars
musicOMH	3.5/5 stars
NME	8/10
The Observer	4/5 stars
Q	4/5 stars
This Is Fake DIY	7/10
Uncut	8/10

A Bad Wind Blows in My Heart has received almost universally positive reception from music critics. At Metacritic, which assigns a "weighted average" score to ratings and reviews from selected mainstream music critics, the Metascore for the album is a 78, which is based on 10 reviews. At AnyDecentMusic?, they have a "weighted average" rating of a 7.3-out-of-ten that is based on 11 reviews.

James Christopher Monger of Allmusic called it a "measured, melancholy, and mysterious, Jones' debut as a singer/songwriter is as subtle as it is striking, skillfully marrying the sedate melancholy of Elliott Smith with the sly, darkly comic lyricism of The National." At The Fly, Edward Devlin evoked that it is "an intimate and very British release to cherish and hold close; it also happens to be one of the year’s best so far." Barry Nicolson of NME proclaimed it to be "a meticulously crafted album." At The Observer, Phil Mongredien told that "there's a disarming openness to the lyrics and a warmth to the arrangements that make this an album that rewards repeated listening."

Theresa Flanagan of In Your Speakers rated the album a 76-out-of-100, and affirmed that it "is a pretty big step out of the shadows for Ryder-Jones, which is clear in the genre-appropriate intimate vulnerability of the album." At Uncut, Jim Wirth noted how "the results are extraordinary." James Oldham of Q wrote that the album has "takes on a conventional band set-up, but it's as impressive, offering a crisply original take on the classic singer-songwriter approach." In addition, Oldham proclaimed Ryder-Jones "a true talent to keep an eye on." At Mojo, Lois Wilson highlighted that "the resulting songs [...] [are] beautifully built around guitar, piano, drums and strings [...] [and] are as their psycho-geography would suggest, intimate autobiographies, about ruined relationships."

At musicOMH, Martin Headon alluded to how the release is "an intriguing prospect" that is "a brave album [...] predictably melancholy and unassuming, perhaps, but also highly accomplished and sometimes deeply affecting." Dan Clay of Soundblab rated that album a 7.5-out-of-ten, and told that Ryder-Jones has "honed his melodic skills" because he has "emerged from jangly-pop kings The Coral," with an album that has a "melancholy feel." At This Is Fake DIY, Johnny Owen found that "while it had to have taken some stones to leave his comfort zone and decide to go his own way with no safety net, it seems like it was a gamble that’ll pay off for both him and us", and this leaves "any doubts though have [arisen], with 'A Bad Wind Blows In My Heart', [have] been well and truly dispelled." Mike Emerson of The 405 rated the album a 7-out-of-ten, and called it "a luxurious listen."

However, Dean Van Nguyen of Pitchfork rated that album a 5.2-out-of-10.0, and noted how the album has "a clumsy title," but found "what's most disappointing about the album is how Ryder-Jones has almost completely abandoned taking any sonic risks." At the Metro, Amy Rose Dawson evoked that the release "provides some momentary oomph [...] but this is ultimately music for those who find the likes of Damien Rice over-stimulating."

== Track listing ==
All tracks are written by Bill Ryder-Jones.

No.	Title	Length
1.	"Hanging Song"	3:59
2.	"There's a World Between Us"	4:34
3.	"A Bad Wind Blows in My Heart"	2:21
4.	"By Morning"	3:35
5.	"The Lemon Tree #3"	4:17
6.	"Anthony & Owen"	5:51
7.	"Wild Swans"	4:29
8.	"Christina That's the Saddest Thing"	4:03
9.	"You're Getting Like Your Sister"	5:33
10.	"He Took You in His Arms"	3:58
11.	"A Bad Wind Blows in My Heart, Pt. 2"	5:20

== Personnel ==
- Bill Ryder-Jones – producer

Production

- James Ford – additional producer, additional engineer, mixing
- Darren Jones – additional producer, additional engineer, additional mixing

Other personnel

- Matthew Cooper – design
- Paul J. Street – design
- Alex Southern – photography
- Ada Stallman – artwork

== Chart performance ==
Chart (2013)	Peak position
UK Albums (OCC)	174
