= Duels (band) =

English indie rock band

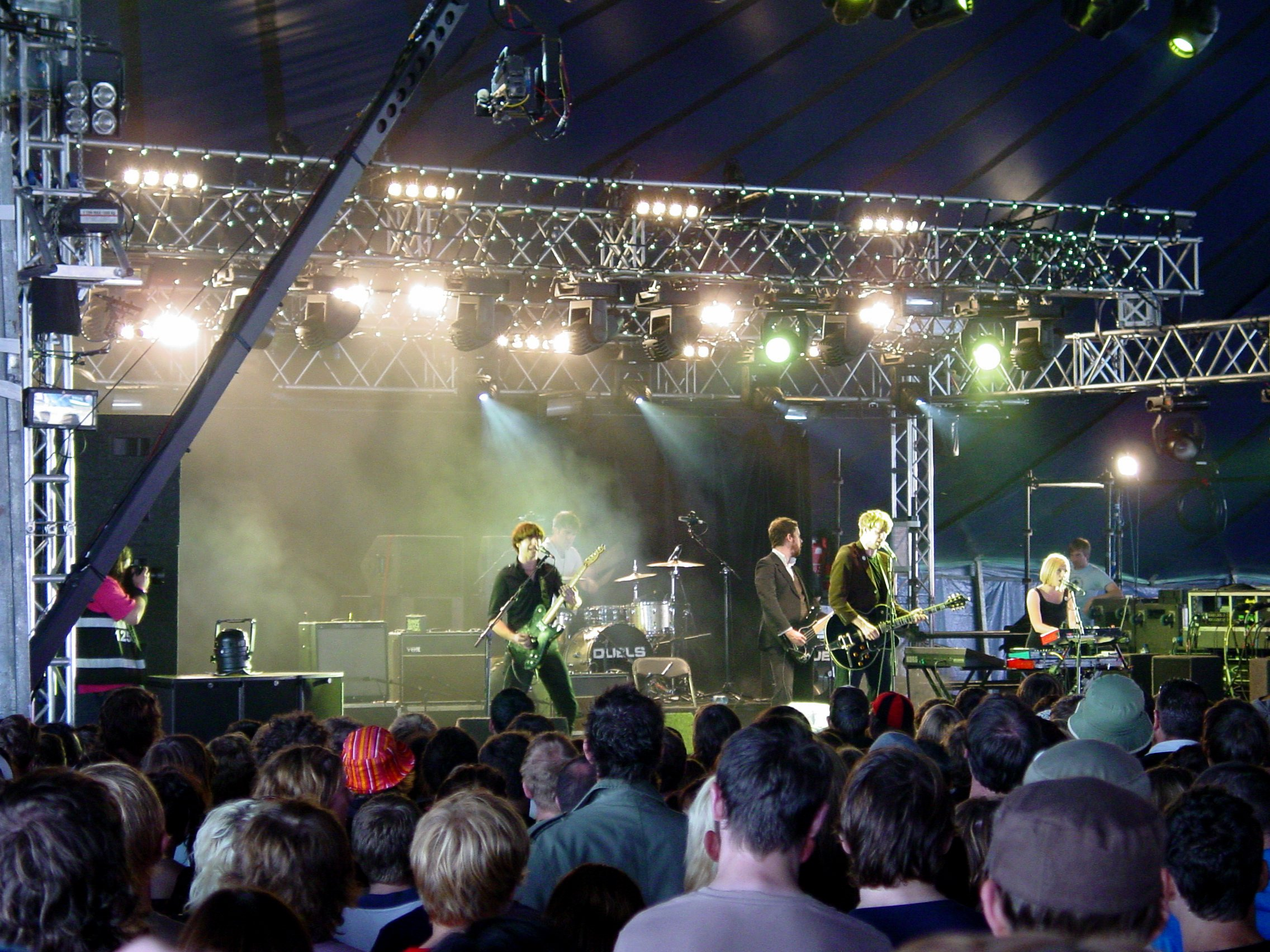
- Duels performing at the 2006 Leeds Festival

Background information
- Origin: Leeds, West Yorkshire, England
- Genres: Indie rock
- Years active: 2005–present
- Labels: This Is Fake DIY; Nude; Transgressive
- Members: Jon Foulger; Jim Foulger; Jon Maher; James Kirkbright; Katherine Botterill
- Website: http://www.duelsmusic.co.uk/

Duels are an English indie rock band from Leeds formed in 2005. They have been described by The Guardian as "one of Britain's most ambitious groups" The band's debut album, The Bright Lights and What I Should Have Learned was released in July 2006 and received an 8/10 review in the NME, while also being named 'Album of the Week' in The Sunday Times, The Guardian and on XFM.

== Band members ==
- Jon Foulger (Vocals/Guitar)
- Jim Foulger (Guitar)
- Jon Maher (Bass)
- James Kirkbright (Drums)
- Katherine Botterill (Keyboards)

== Career ==
Duels had its roots in the band SammyUSA. Their early demos received welcome attention from UK radio DJs such as Zane Lowe and Steve Lamacq. Their first limited-edition single "Potential Futures" was released on the Transgressive Records label on 18 July 2005. The song featured on the Fifa 2006 soundtrack.

In May 2005, they signed to Nude Records. Their second single, "Pressure On You", was released on 7 November 2005. Third single, "Animal" was released on Monday 10 April 2006. Duels' debut album, "The Bright Lights and What I Should Have Learned" was released in July 2006. It received a positive review in the New Musical Express (NME), garnering an 8/10 review score, Clash magazine, Time Out and was named Album of the Week in The Sunday Times, The Guardian and on XFM. The band released two further EP's in 2006, "The Slow Build EP" and the "Once In The Night EP".

Throughout 2006, the band played radio sessions for BBC Radio 2 DJ Janice Long, 6Music's Marc Riley and Tom Robinson and appeared on The Album Chart Show.

On 5 March 2007, the band announced via the blog on their Myspace page that they and their record label, Nude Records, had parted ways.

Duels announced via their website on 13 September 2007 that their second album would be entitled The Barbarians Move In. The album was exclusively digitally released via their official website from 14 February 2008, followed by a physical release on 28 April on This Is Fake DIY Records. A vinyl single version of "Regeneration" preceded the physical album. The album has received widespread critical acclaim and positive reviews:

Q Magazine - "...laudably sophisticated, laudably widescreen, Q Recommends - ****"
Artrocker - "The album for armies to listen to before they go to war"
NME - "unequivocal brilliance...best comeback of 2008 so far - 8/10"
The Guardian - "an Orwellian opus that bucks prevailing trends. One of Britain's most ambitious groups - ****"
Clash magazine - "the kind of record they always threatened to make...a darkening canvas of the band's immense progression"
Leeds Music Scene - "9/10"
The Sun - "enthralling"
Teletext - "a very English air of foreboding - 8/10"
Whisperin & Hollerin - "outstanding in range, inventiveness and emotional strength - 9/10"
Clickmusic - "dark, dramatic and sinister, but that brooding combination might just switch a light on in your head - ****"
Sound Of Violence - "9/10"
Vibrations - "it would be difficult to overstate quite how good this record is"
Rocksound - "grimly fiendish"
Subba-Cultcha - "something that will terrify us at first yet will fall in love with too - *****"
New Noise.net - "a quite beautiful record.....dark and disarming"

In February 2009, ¡Forward Russia! guitarist Whiskas joined the band as a full-time member.

As of early 2009, Duels are writing and rehearsing their third full-length album.

== Tour dates ==
Duels toured with Graham Coxon, opening the nights for the former Blur guitarist, The Rakes and across Europe with The Kooks and The Zutons. They have played the V Festival, Reading and Leeds Festivals and opened the Main Stage at T in the Park in 2006. They also played a one-off date with The Automatic, supporting Kaiser Chiefs in Leeds, and the SXSW Festival in Texas in 2006.

== Discography ==
=== Studio albums ===
- The Bright Lights and What I Should Have Learned - July 2006
- The Barbarians Move In - February 2008

=== Singles ===
- "Potential Futures" (18/7/2005)
- "Pressure On You" (7/11/2005)
- "Animal" (10/4/2006) UK No. 47
- "Idle Pursuits" (24/06/2006) UK No. 76
- The Slow Build EP (double 7" vinyl set) (24/07/2006)
- Once In The Night EP (double 7" vinyl set)(16/10/2006)
- Regeneration (7" vinyl) (14/08/2008)
