= Submarine (novel) =

2008 novel by Joe Dunthorne

- First edition cover
- Author: Joe Dunthorne
- Language: English
- Genre: Coming-of-age fiction
- Published: February 2008
- Publisher: Hamish Hamilton; Penguin Books
- Publication place: United Kingdom
- Media type: Print (hardback, Ebook and paperback)
- Pages: 410
- ISBN: 978-1-40742-810-9

Submarine is a 2008 novel written by Welsh novelist Joe Dunthorne. It was released in February 2008, published by Hamish Hamilton. The plot revolves around a 14-year-old boy named Oliver Tate, attempting to repair his parents' marriage, while also trying to lose his virginity and perfect a relationship with a girl named Jordana Bevan. The novel is a coming-of-age story that deals with issues of teenage angst. Dunthorne wrote the novel while attending the University of East Anglia. Upon finishing the novel, he showed it to the manager of the independent film company Warp Films.

Submarine received positive reviews from critics during its initial release, with many praising its story structure and Dunthorne's writing techniques. In 2010, director Richard Ayoade adapted the novel into a film of the same name, it was released on 18 March 2011 in the United Kingdom, and in the United States on 3 June 2011.

== Development and release ==
Submarine was written by Welsh novelist Joe Dunthorne while he was taking a creative writing course at the University of East Anglia. Dunthorne was searching the internet for music when he saw a job advertisement from Warp Films that solicited internship applications. He persuaded his housemate to apply to the film company, and then ended up showing the manuscript of Submarine to the company's manager. After the unfinished manuscript had been seen, producer Mary Burke quickly optioned the novel's screen rights. Afterwards, Dunthorne posted the first chapter of Submarine onto ABCtales.com and its popularity there helped to motivate him to finish writing the book.

Submarine was originally published by Hamish Hamilton in hardcover in February 2008. The novel is a coming-of-age story that features themes of teenage angst. Penguin Books released a paperback version on 16 June 2009 and an ebook edition was released on 31 January 2017.

== Premise ==
In the city of Swansea, 14-year-old Oliver Tate believes his father is depressed, while his mother is having an affair with her capoeira teacher. Oliver tries desperately to re-connect his family together, while also balancing the idea of losing his virginity by the time he turns sixteen. He then pursues a relationship with a girl in his class named Jordana Bevan, but Oliver finds out Jordana's mother has been diagnosed with a brain tumor. He agrees to visit her mother at the hospital the day of her operation, however he abandons her to continue fixing his parents' relationship. This causes Jordana to leave Oliver, leading to him becoming depressed. After Oliver lashes out at his parents and storms out of the house in anger, feeling frustrated with the way their marriage is going downhill, they start talking about their real feelings to one another, and they eventually reconcile. The novel ends with the family on a beach, staring out into the ocean watching the sunset.

== Reception ==
Submarine received positive reviews from critics upon its release. Tim Adams, writing for The Guardian, wrote "It is, therefore, remarkable how much genuine life and surprise Joe Dunthorne brings to it in his perfectly pitched debut novel Submarine." A writer from BookTrust called the novel "funny", and praised it for its film adaptation, comparing it to the works of Wes Anderson and Nouvelle Vague. Nicholas Tucker of The Independent praised its story, claiming "This first novel by a young Welsh poet is the sharpest, funniest, rudest account of a periodically troubled male teenager's coming-of-age since The Catcher in the Rye" (1951). A writer for The Free Lance-Star wrote "Submarine is one debut that shouldn't be ignored." Mary Lou Zeitoun, writing for The Globe and Mail, stated "Dunthorne delivers a ripping good series of tension filled chapters". Sarah Towers of The New York Times praised the novel's premise, and claimed it was "full of cheekiness." In 2014, it was nominated in Wales Arts Review's Greatest Welsh Novel, although it lost to Caradog Prichards One Moonlit Night (1961). Elin Williams, writing for the same publication, argued that Submarine is "deservedly one of Wales' best novels, simply because it just is Welsh" [emphasis in original].

=== Adaptation ===
Submarine was made into a film adaptation in 2010 by Richard Ayoade. It stars Noah Taylor, Paddy Considine, Craig Roberts, Yasmin Paige and Sally Hawkins. Principal photography began in October 2009, lasting for seven weeks in the towns of Swansea, Cardiff, Rhondda, and Barry. Alex Turner, the frontman of the English rock band Arctic Monkeys, composed the soundtrack for the film, which was released on 14 March 2011. The film premiered at the 35th Toronto International Film Festival on 12 September 2010, and was officially released in the United Kingdom on 18 March 2011. It was later released in the United States on 3 June, with a DVD release following on 4 October, being distributed by Anchor Bay Entertainment.
