= Joe Dunthorne =

Welsh novelist, poet and journalist

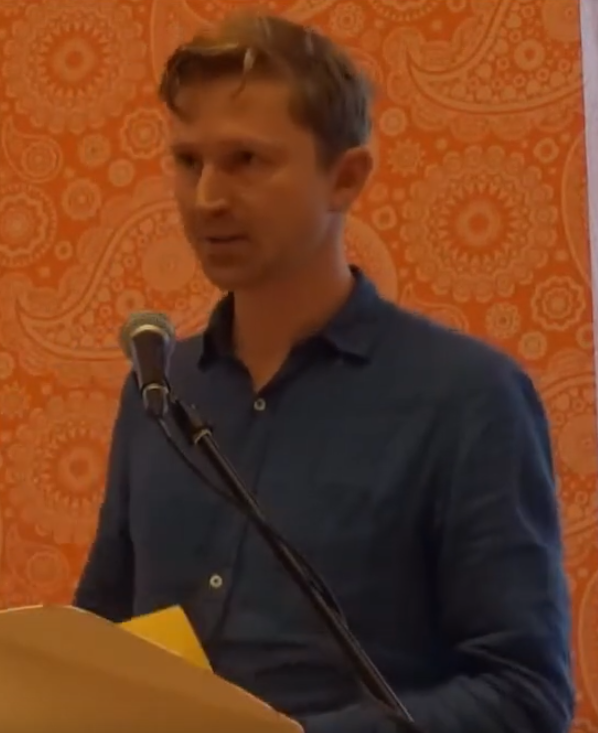
- Joe Dunthorne (2019)
- Born: 14 January 1982 (age 44); Swansea, Wales
- Education: University of East Anglia
- Occupations: Novelist, poet, journalist
- Writing career
- Language: English
- Period: 2008–present
- Genre: Literary fiction
- Notable work: Submarine (2008)
- Notable awards: Encore Award 2011
- Website: www.joedunthorne.com

Joe Dunthorne (born 14 January 1982) is a Welsh novelist, poet and journalist. He made his name with his novel Submarine (2008), made into a film in 2010. His second novel, Wild Abandon (2011), won the RSL Encore Award. A selection of his poems was published in 2010 in the Faber New Poets series. He published first solo collection of poems, titled O Positive, in 2019.

== Education ==
Joseph Oliver Dunthorne was born in Swansea, Wales on 14 January 1982. He has two sisters, Anna and Leah.

Dunthorne was educated at Olchfa School, Swansea before going on to study creative writing at the University of East Anglia (UEA). He graduated from the UEA with an MA in creative writing. In the final year of his course he began writing his debut novel Submarine, for which he won the university's inaugural Curtis Brown Prize.

== Career ==
Dunthorne's first novel Submarine, in which a teenager records with comedy and anguish his relationship with his girlfriend and his lop-sided view of the strains on his parents' marriage, was published by Penguin imprint Hamish Hamilton to critical acclaim in 2008. Shortly afterwards, the novel was made into a film, directed by Richard Ayoade and starring Craig Roberts, Yasmin Paige, Noah Taylor, Paddy Considine, and Sally Hawkins. The film premiered at the 35th Toronto International Film Festival, and was shown in London, Berlin and Swansea before going on general release in March 2011.

In 2010, a selection of Dunthorne's poetry was published as part of the Faber New Poets series, a scheme providing mentoring and financial support for unpublished poets.

Dunthorne's second novel, Wild Abandon, was published by Penguin in 2011. An account of a brother and sister living in a rural commune, it went on to win the Royal Society of Literature's Encore Award for Best Second Novel. In 2019, Dunthorne published his first collection of poetry, O Positive.

In 2025, Dunthorne released his first non-fiction book Children of Radium, in which he traces back the history of his great-grandfather, Siegfried Merzbacher, a German-Jewish chemist who developed radioactive toothpaste and later contributed to chemical weapons research in Nazi Germany. In examining his great-grandfather's 2000-page unpublished memoir and conducting international research, Dunthorne's book explores themes of historical truth, moral ambiguity, and the complexities of family legacy.

== Personal life ==
Dunthorne lives in London.

== Publications ==
=== Fiction ===
- Submarine. Hamish Hamilton. 2008. ISBN 978-0241143964.
- Wild Abandon. Penguin. 2012. ISBN 978-0141033952.
- The Adulterants. Hamish Hamilton. 2018. ISBN 978-0241305478.

=== Non-fiction ===
- Children of Radium: A Buried Inheritance. Hamish Hamilton. 2025. ISBN 978-0241517468.

=== Poetry ===
- Faber New Poets 5. Faber & Faber. 2010. ISBN 978-0571249992.
- O Positive. Faber & Faber. 2019. ISBN 978-0571342556.

== Other media ==
=== Film ===
- Submarine

=== Radio ===
- Half Life
- The Accident Report Book
