= Bill Ryder-Jones =

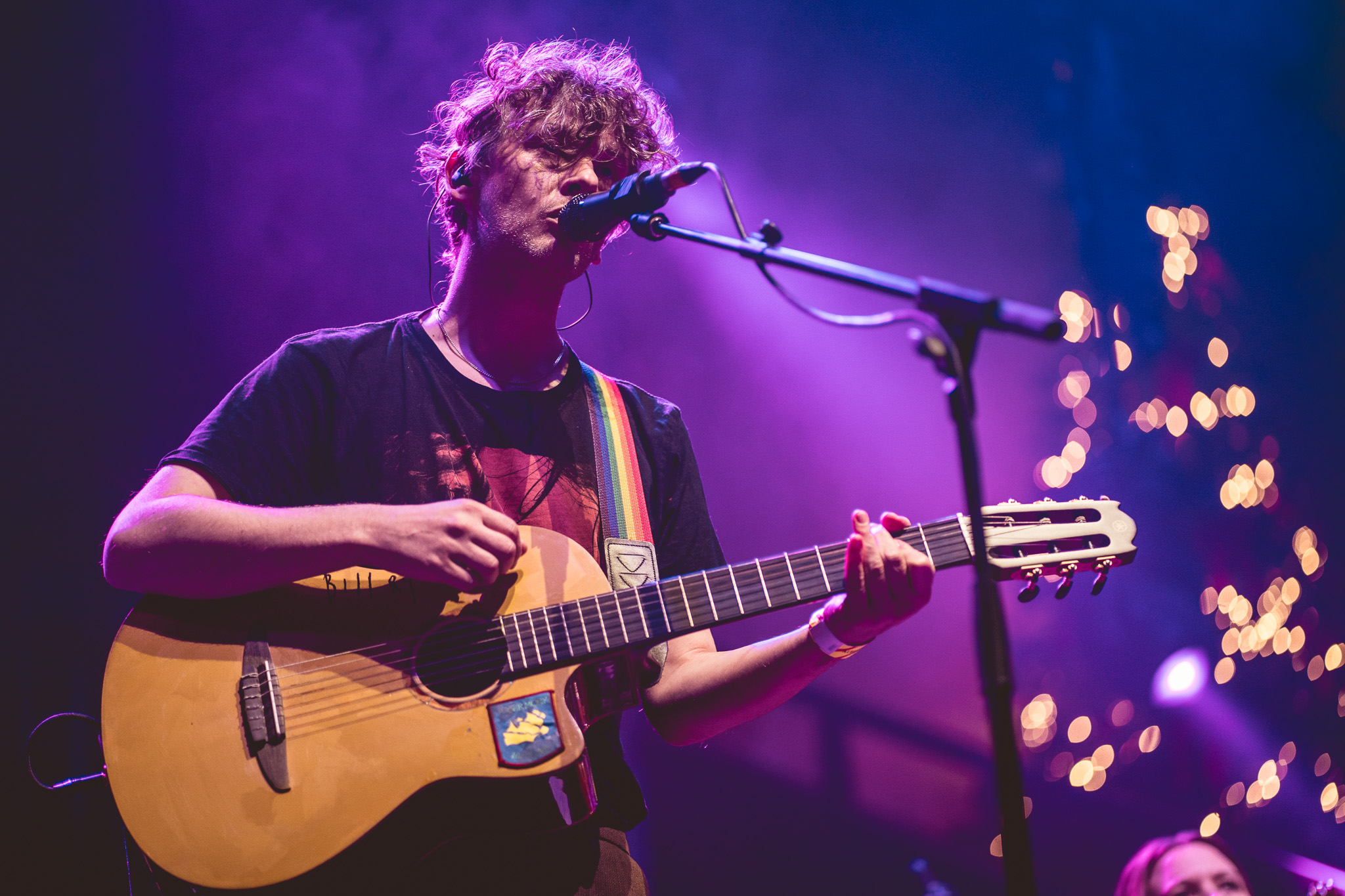
- Ryder-Jones performing in 2024

Background information
- Born: William Edward Ryder-Jones; 10 August 1983 (age 42); Warrington, Cheshire, England
- Origin: West Kirby, Merseyside, England
- Genres: Folk; folk rock; minimal; alternative rock; indie rock
- Occupations: Musician; singer; songwriter; composer; record producer
- Instruments: Vocals; guitar; piano; bass; drums; violin; trumpet; ukulele; glockenspiel; harmonium
- Years active: 1996–present
- Labels: Domino; Double Six
- Formerly of: The Coral
- Website: http://billryderjones.co.uk

William Edward Ryder-Jones (born 10 August 1983) is an English singer-songwriter, musician, music producer and composer from West Kirby, Merseyside. He co-founded the band The Coral, together with James Skelly, Lee Southall, Paul Duffy, and Ian Skelly, playing as their lead guitarist from 1996 until 2008. He has since pursued a solo career, writing both his own albums and film scores, as well as producing records for other artists and appearing as a session musician.

Ryder-Jones' debut album, If..., an instrumental concept album featuring the Royal Liverpool Philharmonic, serving as an imaginary film score for the Italo Calvino novel, If on a Winter's Night a Traveler..., was released in 2011. His second album, A Bad Wind Blows in My Heart was released in 2013, again to positive reviews. His third, West Kirby County Primary, was released in November 2015. Both are departures from the orchestral nature of If..., the former featuring a more traditional collection of minimal folk songs, and the latter being a heavier, more alternative folk rock album.

== Career ==
=== The Coral ===
Ryder-Jones was the lead guitarist with The Coral and played on the band's first five albums. In 2005, he briefly stopped touring with the band due to a stress-related illness. It was announced on 9 January 2008 that Ryder-Jones had left The Coral and the remaining five members would continue with the band.

=== Early solo work and If... (2009–2011) ===
Following his departure from The Coral, Ryder-Jones began writing songs and instrumental pieces and uploaded several demo recordings to his MySpace profile. In 2009, Ryder-Jones composed the score for his friend's short film Leave Taking, directed by Laurence Easeman. The four compositions were released on his debut EP A Leave Taking Soundtrack as a free download in July 2011 by Double Six Records (a subsidiary of Domino Recording Company) via their website and a music video was filmed for the title track "A Leave Taking". The EP was also released on 12-inch and digital download formats on 26 September 2011. Ryder-Jones also composed the scores for the short films It's Natural to Be Afraid (2010) and Bed (2011).

Ryder-Jones' debut solo album If... was written as a musical adaptation of Italo Calvino's 1979 novel If on a Winter's Night a Traveler, with each composition representing a different chapter in the book. The idea for the album was first conceived after a meeting with Laurence Bell, the head of Domino Records, who had suggested Ryder-Jones record an "imaginary film score". Recording sessions for If... took place during 2010 at various locations on Merseyside, including Elevator Studios, the Scandinavian Church of Liverpool, The Friary in Everton and Ryder-Jones' mother's house in West Kirby. Most of the album's tracks were recorded with the Royal Liverpool Philharmonic orchestra. Ryder-Jones' musical influences for the album came from film score composers such as Abel Korzeniowski, Michael Galasso and Clint Mansell and rock artists such as Syd Barrett, Nick Cave and Gorky's Zygotic Mynci. If... was released on 14 November 2011 and received largely positive reviews from music critics.

=== A Bad Wind Blows in My Heart, scrapped third album, and West Kirby County Primary (2012–2018) ===
On 29 April 2013, the soundtrack to the 2012 film Piggy was self-released by Ryder-Jones on Bandcamp, with proceeds going to the Trekstock charity.

Ryder-Jones' second and third albums, A Bad Wind Blows in My Heart, released 2013, and West Kirby County Primary, released 2015, are both a departure from If...'s orchestral nature. They do, however, retain the concept album theme (both albums focus around Ryder-Jones' life). A Bad Wind Blows in My Heart is a collection of folk and folk rock songs, influenced by Ryder-Jones' love of Bill Callahan as well as various other minimal and folk artists. West Kirby County Primary is a heavy, alternative and folk rock album, influenced by bands such as Gorky's Zygotic Mynci, Super Furry Animals, The Strokes and Pavement. It was recorded with friends, adding to the band-theme Ryder-Jones was trying to capture. The track Wild Roses was co-written by Ryder-Jones and friends Emma Leatherbarrow (of MiNNETONKA) and Liam Power (of By the Sea); Ryder-Jones claims to have only written the chorus. "Seabirds" was co-written by Ryder-Jones and Leatherbarrow. Half of the album was written at Ryder-Jones' home, before continuing to work on the material at his home studio, located in his old bedroom in his mother's house, and at Parr St. Studios in Liverpool.

In an interview with BBC Radio 6 Music, Ryder-Jones stated that he had chosen to scrap an album's worth of material after being unsatisfied with the result. He said, "I wasn't writing things that were making me happy in the moment. I got lost a little bit in why I was doing it and as a result wasn't living in the most responsible way. So the record I made during that time, thankfully, Domino were kind enough to let me drop. Some of the things that had happened to me though during the making of that record, the one I eventually dropped, turned out to be interesting enough to make good songs out of!"

Ryder-Jones embarked on a ten-date tour of England and Scotland from 24 October to 14 November 2015 to celebrate the release of West Kirby County Primary. The first five dates were in support of Spector. He continued to tour into 2015, including various festival dates. He concluded the album's tour cycle with a final leg in late 2016, playing six UK dates. The 'Ta-Tah Tour' featured support from By the Sea, MiNNETONKA and Matt Maltese.

=== Yawn and Yawny Yawn (2018–2019) ===
Ryder-Jones released the album Yawn on 2 November 2018 and after this, Yawny Yawn on 26 July 2019. Yawny Yawn is an acoustic reworking of Yawn and features the same songs, just with different instrumentation. Both albums have been critically acclaimed and Ryder-Jones finished a tour of the Yawny Yawn album in November 2019.

=== Iechyd Da (2023–present) ===
On 19 September 2023, Ryder-Jones announced Iechyd Da, his first album in five years, which was released on 12 January 2024 on Domino. The album marked his first entry in the UK top 40 at number 30, as well as hitting number 3 or higher in the UK Record Store, Physical, Vinyl, Independent and Album Sales charts.

The album was produced by Ryder-Jones at his Yawn studio in West Kirby, England. Its title translates as "good health" in Welsh. Ryder-Jones stated that he has not been "this proud of a record since A Bad Wind Blows in My Heart" and called it his "most produced record".

Iechyd Da received a score of 90 out of 100 on review aggregator Metacritic based on eleven critics' reviews, indicating "universal acclaim". Mojo felt that the album "documents a period of intense anguish with careful understatement and smart musical references". Shaun Curran of Record Collector in their five star review called it "a truly wonderful record, one that embellishes Ryder-Jones' writing in ways both grand and unusual, without sacrificing any of the closeness – his lyrics remain raw and direct – or melodic knack". The Guardian's Dave Simpson described it as "overwhelmingly lovely, with classy hooks and rousing choruses" and remarked that Ryder-Jones's "closely mic-ed voice is fragile, delicate, even on the edge of croaky, giving the impression he's sharing intimacies directly with the listener". Reviewing the album for Uncut, Laura Barton, rating the album 9/10 found it to contain "songs marked by a remarkable closeness, by the intimacy of place and people" in "a world filled with colloquialisms and gentle wit, where we were all on first-name terms and the geography sat in our marrow."

Following the album's release Ryder-Jones embarked on a sold-out 20-date tour of Europe, festival performances, and a full European tour supporting Beth Gibbons. The second half of 2024 saw further festival performances, a sold-out headline concert at London's prestigious Barbican Centre Main Hall, and a co-headline tour with Gruff Rhys in concert halls across England, Ireland and Wales.

== Musical style and influences ==
Ryder-Jones has said that the sound of all three albums of his albums have been heavily influenced by the music he was listening to, and was interested in at the time of writing and recording. He stated in an interview with BBC Radio 6 Music that when making If.., he'd been "obsessed with classical music for a year-and-a-half", while when he was making West Kirby County Primary, he had "started to enjoy heavier music". He has previously confessed admiration for Bill Callahan, suggesting that he influenced the sound of A Bad Wind Blows in My Heart.

== Collaboration and production ==
Ryder-Jones has recorded guitar for other artists such as The Last Shadow Puppets on "Gas Dance" (B-side of "Standing Next to Me"), Arctic Monkeys on "Fireside" and Alex Turner on the Submarine EP. In 2011, he collaborated with Graham Coxon and Paloma Faith on the song "Desire", which was released online by Converse. He has also been a guest guitarist and keyboardist on Arctic Monkeys' AM Tour.

Ryder-Jones has produced and co-produced many albums with other artists. These include co-producing The Wytches's debut album Annabel Dream Reader with the band's frontman Kristian Bell, released in August 2014. and Hooton Tennis Club's debut album Highest Point in Clifftown, released in August 2015. In 2014 Ryder-Jones also co-produced the album Endless Days Crystal Sky for the neo-post-punk band By the Sea. More recently, he has produced Our Girl's album Stranger Today, Brooke Bentham's album Everyday Nothing, and Michael Head and The Red Elastic Band's 2022 album, Dear Scott, which picked up Mojo's album of the year and peaked at number 6 in the UK Albums Chart.

2024 has seen the release of Bill Ryder-Jones produced albums by Amelia Coburn, Saint Saviour, The Rhythm Method, Michael Head and The Red Elastic Band, Bedrooms, and Swim Deep.

== Discography ==
=== Studio albums ===
Title	Details	Peak chart positions
Title	Details	UK
If...	Released: 11 November 2011; Label: Domino; Formats: CD, vinyl, digital download	—
A Bad Wind Blows in My Heart	Released: 8 April 2013; Label: Domino; Formats: CD, vinyl, digital download	174
Piggy Soundtrack	Released: 29 April 2013; Label: Domino; Formats: CD, vinyl, digital download	—
West Kirby County Primary	Released: 6 November 2015; Label: Domino; Formats: CD, vinyl, digital download	110
Yawn	Released: 2 November 2018; Label: Domino; Formats: CD, vinyl, digital download, streaming	57
Yawny Yawn	Released: 26 July 2019; Label: Domino; Formats: CD, vinyl, digital download, streaming	—
Iechyd Da	Released: 12 January 2024; Label: Domino; Formats: CD, vinyl, digital download, streaming	30
"—" denotes an album that did not chart or was not released in that territory.

=== Extended plays ===
Title	Details
A Leave Taking Soundtrack	Released: 23 September 2011; Label: Domino; Formats: Digital download

== Selected productions ==
Year	Release	Artist	Label	Role
2011	Waltz Away 7"	By The Sea	The Great Pop Supplement	Producer
2012	The Lost Brothers Album	The Lost Brothers	Lojinx	Producer
2012	Ophelia Album	Bird	Self Release	Producer
2014	Burn Out The Bruise 7"	The Wytches	Heavenly Recordings	Producer
2014	Annabel Dream Reader Album	The Wytches	Partisan Records	Producer
2014	Tap Tap Tap 7"	We Are Catchers	Domino Recording Company	Producer
2014	In The Seams Album	Saint Saviour	Surface Area	Producer
2014	Wire Frame Mattress Album	The Wytches	Heavenly Recordings	Producer
2015	Jasper / Standing Knees 7"	Hooton Tennis Club	Heavenly Recordings	Producer
2016	Midnight Control 7"	Milburn	VAM Records	Producer
2016	Time Album	Milburn	Count to Ten	Producer
2018	Our Girl 7"	Our Girl	Cannibal Hymns	Producer
2018	Stranger Today Album	Our Girl	Cannibal Hymns	Producer
2020	The Trappers Pelts 7"	Yard Act	Turntable Kitchen	Engineer
2020	Everyday Nothing Album	Brooke Bentham	Allpoints	Producer
2022	Dear Scott Album	Michael Head and the Red Elastic Band	Modern Sky UK	Producer
2022	Heaven Knows Magnolia Album	By The Sea	Dell'Orso Records	Producer
2023	100% Endurance 7"	Yard Act & Elton John	ZEN FC / Island	Arranged by (Strings)
2024	Between the Moon and the Milkman Album	Amelia Coburn	Shoebox Records	Producer
2024	Peachy Album	The Rhythm Method	Moshi Moshi Records	Producer
2024	Sunseeker Album	Saint Saviour	VLF Records	Producer
2024	Loophole Album	Michael Head & The Red Elastic Band	Modern Sky / Virgin	Producer
2024	There's A Big Star Outside Album	Swim Deep	Submarine Cat	Producer

== Scores ==
Year	Title	Director	Notes
2009	Leave Taking	Laurence Easeman	Short film
2010	It's Natural to Be Afraid	Justin Doherty	Short film
2011	Bed	James Lees	Short film
2012	Piggy	Kieron Hawkes	
