= Humbug Tour =

2009–10 concert tour by Arctic Monkeys

- World tour by Arctic Monkeys
- Location: North America; Europe
- Associated album: Humbug
- Start date: 13 January 2009
- End date: 22 April 2010
- No. of shows: 105

Arctic Monkeys concert chronology
- Favourite Worst Nightmare Tour (2007); Humbug Tour (2009–10); Suck It and See Tour (2011–12)

The Humbug Tour was a world concert tour by British indie rock band Arctic Monkeys in support of their third studio album, Humbug. Although Humbug was not released until 25 August 2009, the tour started with a series of shows in Australia and New Zealand in the January of that year, followed by a break for the band to put the finishing touches on the record. The tour then resumed in Poland on 2 July 2009. The band proceeded to tour through 2009 and into 2010, ending with 15 dates in April across the United States and Mexico.

== Set list ==
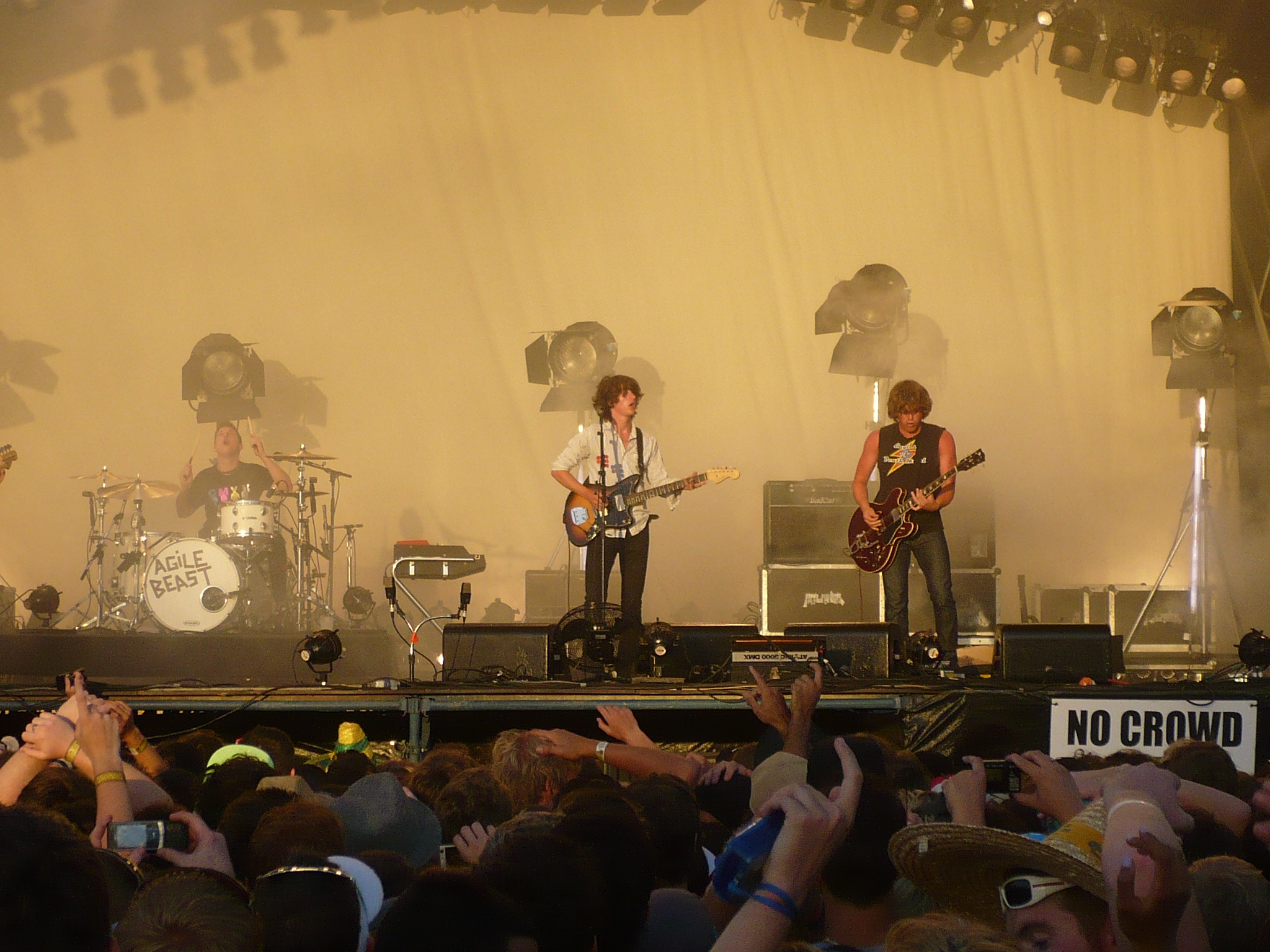
The band performing at Big Day Out

The set list evolved over the duration of the tour, but primarily focused on songs from Humbug. Songs from Whatever People Say I Am, That's What I'm Not were primarily left out of the set, with "The View from the Afternoon", "I Bet You Look Good on the Dancefloor", and "Still Take You Home" being the only songs to regularly feature from the band's record breaking debut album. The set list was briefly modified to include "When The Sun Goes Down" and a snippet of "Mardy Bum" during the November 2009 European dates. "When the Sun Goes Down" also returned for select shows in 2010, but "Mardy Bum" did not.

Generally, the band opened each gig with a song from Humbug (either "Pretty Visitors" or "Dance Little Liar"), followed by "Brianstorm", "This House is a Circus" and "Still Take You Home". The mid-part of the set list was commonly rotated but generally featured two songs from Whatever People Say I Am, That's What I'm Not, three songs from Favourite Worst Nightmare, seven from Humbug and a cover of Nick Cave's 1994 hit; "Red Right Hand". In addition, a B-side from the Humbug sessions would often make the set list (often "Sketchead" or "Catapult"), although Favourite Worst Nightmare B-side "Nettles" was included during the last US leg in Spring 2010. Following the last song of the main set (usually "Do Me a Favour" in North America and "Secret Door" in Europe), the band returned for a two-song encore.

The encore typically consisted of a new version of "Fluorescent Adolescent", which had been transposed to include a snippet of a different song (most commonly "Only You Know" by Dion or "Strange" by Patsy Kline), as well as standard closing number "505". Both songs in the encore were generally from the band's 2007 album Favourite Worst Nightmare as a few variations included either "If You Were There, Beware", or the aforementioned B-side "Nettles".

== Songs performed ==
Whatever People Say I Am, That's What I'm Not

- "The View from the Afternoon"
- "I Bet You Look Good on the Dancefloor"
- "Dancing Shoes" (dropped after 26 January 2009)
- "Still Take You Home"
- "When The Sun Goes Down" (occasionally played)
- "From the Ritz to the Rubble" (dropped after 24 January 2009, played from 2 to 9 July 2009)

Favourite Worst Nightmare

- "Brianstorm"
- "Fluorescent Adolescent" (with snippets of "Mardy Bum", "Only You Know" by Dion or "Strange" by Patsy Kline)
- "Only Ones Who Know" (added on 2 July 2009, dropped after 28 September 2009)
- "Do Me a Favour"
- "This House Is A Circus"
- "If You Were There, Beware"
- "505" (added on 2 July 2009)

Humbug

- "My Propeller" (added on 1 August 2009)
- "Crying Lightning"
- "Dangerous Animals" (occasionally played)
- "Secret Door" (added on 2 July 2009)
- "Potion Approaching"
- "Fire and the Thud" (added on 28 March 2010, omitted on 6 April 2010)
- "Cornerstone" (added on 1 August 2009)
- "Dance Little Liar" (added on 14 September 2009)
- "Pretty Visitors"
- "The Jeweller's Hands" (played occasionally from August 2009 to March 2010)

B-sides

- "Da Frame 2R" (dropped after 30 January 2009, played from 2 July 2009 to 7 August 2009)
- "Nettles" (added on 28 March 2010)
- "Red Right Hand" (Nick Cave and The Bad Seeds cover) (occasionally played)
- "Catapult" (occasionally played from December 2009 to April 2010)
- "Sketchead" (added on 16 September 2009, dropped after 11 December 2009, played on 28 March 2010)
- "Joining The Dots" (added on 28 March 2010)

Others

- "Leave Before the Lights Come On" (dropped after 24 January 2009, re-added on 2 July 2009, omitted on 1 August 2009, dropped again after 3 August 2009)

== Tour dates ==
List of concerts, showing date, city, country, and venue
Date	City	Country	Venue
13 January 2009	Wellington	New Zealand	Wellington Town Hall
15 January 2009	Auckland	New Zealand	The Powerstation
16 January 2009 (Note: The concerts on 16, 18, 23, 26, 30 January and 1 February 2009 concerts were part of the Big Day Out festival series.)	Auckland	New Zealand	Mount Smart Stadium
18 January 2009	Gold Coast	Australia	Gold Coast Parklands
20 January 2009	Melbourne	Australia	Palais Theatre
22 January 2009	Sydney	Australia	Hordern Pavilion
23 January 2009	Sydney	Australia	Sydney Olympic Park
24 January 2009	Melbourne	Australia	Palais Theatre
26 January 2009	Melbourne	Australia	Flemington Racecourse
30 January 2009	Adelaide	Australia	Adelaide Showground
1 February 2009	Perth	Australia	Claremont Showground
2 July 2009 (Note: The 2 July 2009 concert in Gdynia was part of Open'er Festival.)	Gdynia	Poland	Gdynia-Kosakowo Airport
4 July 2009 (Note: The 4 July 2009 concert in Hradec Králové was part of Rock for People.)	Hradec Králové	Czech Republic	Hradec Králové Airport
5 July 2009	Vienna	Austria	Arena
7 July 2009	Split	Croatia	Prokurative
9 July 2009 (Note: The 9 July 2009 concert in Novi Sad was part of Exit Festival.)	Novi Sad	Serbia	Petrovaradin Fortress
1 August 2009 (Note: The 1 August 2009 concert in Jersey City was part of All Points West Festival.)	Jersey City	United States	Liberty State Park
2 August 2009 (Note: The 2 August 2009 concert in Montreal was part of Osheaga Festival.)	Montreal	Canada	Parc Jean-Drapeau
3 August 2009	New York City	United States	Highline Ballroom
5 August 2009	Boston	United States	Paradise Rock Club
7 August 2009	Chicago	United States	Metro Chicago
8 August 2009 (Note: The 8 August 2009 concert in Chicago was part of Lollapalooza.)	Chicago	United States	Grant Park
13 August 2009	Oslo	Norway	Oya Festival
14 August 2009	Gothenburg	Sweden	Way Out West Festival
15 August 2009	Copenhagen	Denmark	Beat Day Festival
20 August 2009	Cologne	Germany	Kulturkirche Köln
21 August 2009	Erfurt	Germany	Highfield Festival
22 August 2009	Hasselt	Belgium	Pukkelpop Festival
23 August 2009	Biddinghuizen	Netherlands	Lowlands Festival
26 August 2009	London	England	Brixton Academy
28 August 2009	Leeds	England	Leeds Festival
29 August 2009	Reading	England	Reading Festival
14 September 2009	San Diego	United States	Soma San Diego
15 September 2009	Los Angeles	United States	Hollywood Palladium
16 September 2009	Oakland	United States	Fox Theatre
18 September 2009	Portland	United States	Wonder Ballroom
19 September 2009	Seattle	United States	The Showbox @ The Market
20 September 2009	Vancouver	Canada	Malkin Bowl
22 September 2009	Salt Lake City	United States	In the Venue
23 September 2009	Denver	United States	Ogden Theatre
25 September 2009	Minneapolis	United States	First Avenue
26 September 2009	Milwaukee	United States	The Rave
28 September 2009	Columbus	United States	Newport Music Hall
29 September 2009	Toronto	Canada	Kool Haus
30 September 2009	Philadelphia	United States	Electric Factory
2 October 2009	New Orleans	United States	House of Blues
3 October 2009	Houston	United States	House of Blues
4 October 2009	Austin	United States	Austin City Limits Festival
5 October 2009	Dallas	United States	The Palladium Ballroom
18 October 2009	Tokyo	Japan	Liquid Room
19 October 2009	Tokyo	Japan	Budokan
3 November 2009	Antwerp	Belgium	Lotto Arena
5 November 2009	Paris	France	Zenith
6 November 2009	Paris	France	Zenith
8 November 2009	Berlin	Germany	Treptow Arena
10 November 2009	Amsterdam	Netherlands	Heineken Music Hall
11 November 2009	Amsterdam	Netherlands	
13 November 2009	Liverpool	England	Echo Arena
14 November 2009	Sheffield	England	Sheffield Arena
16 November 2009	Newcastle upon Tyne	England	Metro Radio Arena
17 November 2009	London	England	Wembley Arena
18 November 2009	London	England	Wembley Arena
20 November 2009	Birmingham	England	National Indoor Arena
21 November 2009	Manchester	England	Manchester Evening News Arena
22 November 2009	Nottingham	England	Trent FM Arena
24 November 2009	Glasgow	Scotland	SECC
25 November 2009	Belfast	Northern Ireland	Odyssey Arena
26 November 2009	Dublin	Ireland	The O2
6 December 2009	Chicago	United States	Riviera Theatre
7 December 2009	Pittsburgh	United States	Mr. Smalls Theatre
8 December 2009	Washington, D.C.	United States	9:30 Club
10 December 2009	New York City	United States	Terminal 5
11 December 2009	New York City	United States	Terminal 5
13 December 2009	Boston	United States	House of Blues
14 December 2009	Montreal	Canada	Métropolis
26 January 2010	Milan	Italy	Palasharp
27 January 2010	Grenoble	France	Summum
29 January 2010	Rennes	France	Liberté
30 January 2010	Bordeaux	France	Medoquine
31 January 2010	Montpellier	France	Zenith
2 February 2010	Porto	Portugal	Coliseum
3 February 2010	Lisbon	Portugal	Campo Pequeno
5 February 2010	Madrid	Spain	Palacio Vistalegre
6 February 2010	Barcelona	Spain	Sant Jordi Club
8 February 2010	Munich	Germany	Zenith
9 February 2010	Offenbach am Main	Germany	Stadthalle Offenbach
10 February 2010	Düsseldorf	Germany	Philipshalle
13 February 2010	Valencia	Spain	Ciudad de las Artes y las Ciencias
27 March 2010	London	England	Royal Albert Hall
28 March 2010	London	England	O2 Shepherd's Bush Empire
1 April 2010	Miami Beach	United States	Fillmore Miami Beach at Jackie
2 April 2010	Tampa	United States	The Ritz
3 April 2010	Hollywood	United States	Hard Rock Live
5 April 2010	Athens	United States	40 Watt Club
6 April 2010	Raleigh	United States	Disco Rodeo
7 April 2010	Baltimore	United States	Rams Head Live
9 April 2010	Covington	United States	Madison Theatre
11 April 2010	St. Louis	United States	The Pageant
12 April 2010	Lawrence	United States	Liberty Hall
13 April 2010	Tulsa	United States	Cain's Ballroom
15 April 2010	Tempe	United States	The Marquee
16 April 2010	Las Vegas	United States	House of Blues
18 April 2010	Pioneertown	United States	Pappy and Harriet's Pioneertown Palace
21 April 2010	Mexico City	Mexico	Estadio Azteca's Esplande
22 April 2010	Guadalajara	Mexico	Foro Alterno

== Personnel ==
Arctic Monkeys

- Alex Turner – lead vocals, electric guitar, acoustic guitar, baritone guitar; keyboards (January–February 2009)
- Jamie Cook – electric guitar, baritone guitar
- Nick O'Malley – bass guitar, backing vocals
- Matt Helders – drums, percussion, backing vocals

Touring musicians

- John Ashton – keyboards, electric guitar, acoustic guitar, baritone guitar, percussion, backing vocals (July 2009–April 2010)

Guests

- Josh Homme – vocals and tambourine on "Dance Little Liar" and "Pretty Visitors" (on Pappy and Harriet's Pioneertown Palace concert)
