= AM Tour =

2013–14 concert tour by Arctic Monkeys

- Tour by Arctic Monkeys
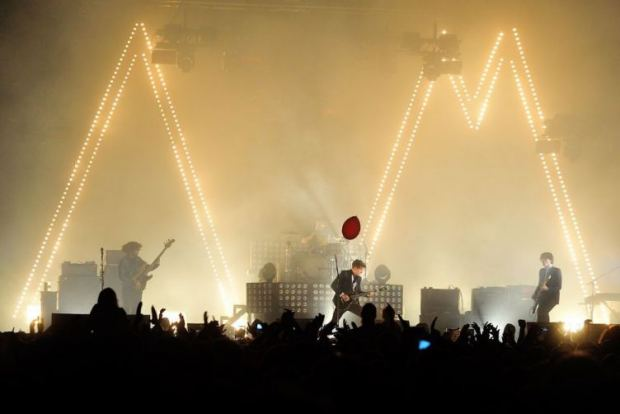
- Location: Europe; North America; Oceania; Asia; South America
- Associated album: AM
- Start date: 22 May 2013
- End date: 15 November 2014
- No. of shows: 154
- Box office: $9,820,744 (18 shows)

Arctic Monkeys concert chronology
- Suck It and See Tour (2011–12); AM Tour (2013–14); Tranquility Base Hotel & Casino Tour (2018–19)

The AM Tour was the fifth headlining concert tour by English indie rock band Arctic Monkeys, launched in support of their fifth studio album, AM (2013). The tour began on 22 May 2013 in Ventura, United States at Ventura Theatre and concluded on 15 November 2014 in Rio de Janeiro, Brazil at HSBC Arena, visiting the Americas, Oceania and Eurasia. This marked their first tour since Suck It and See Tour (2011–2012), and features the band, alongside touring members Scott Gillies, Tom Rowley, and Davey Latter.

== Setlist ==
22 May 2013 – 1 June 2013

1. "Do I Wanna Know?"
2. "R U Mine?"
3. "Dancing Shoes"
4. "Brianstorm"
5. "Brick by Brick"
6. "Don't Sit Down 'Cause I've Moved Your Chair"
7. "Evil Twin"
8. "Old Yellow Bricks"
9. "The Hellcat Spangled Shalalala"
10. "Crying Lightning"
11. "Pretty Visitors"
12. "Do Me a Favour"
13. "Cornerstone"
14. "She's Thunderstorms"
15. "The View from the Afternoon"
16. "Fake Tales of San Francisco"
17. "I Bet You Look Good on the Dancefloor"
18. "That's Where You're Wrong"

Encore

19. "Suck It and See"
20. "Fluorescent Adolescent"
21. "505"

Notes

- On 24 May 2013, "The Hellcat Spangled Shalalala" and "That's Where You're Wrong" weren't performed.
- During the concerts on May 26 and 28, the band performed "That's Where You're Wrong" after "Old Yellow Bricks", ended the main set with "Suck It and See" and played "The Hellcat Spangled Shalalala" at the beginning of encore.
- On May 29 and 31, the band changed the song order, starting the show with "Do I Wanna Know?", "Brianstorm", "Dancing Shoes", "Don't Sit Down 'Cause I've Moved Your Chair", "Brick by Brick", "Fake Tales of San Francisco" and "Evil Twin". Then, after "Cornerstone", Arctic Monkeys performed "Suck It and See", "The View from the Afternoon", "When the Sun Goes Down", "I Bet You Look Good on the Dancefloor" and "R U Mine?". "That's Where You're Wrong", "Fluorescent Adolescent" and "505" were played in encore.
- On June 1, the band performed a set of thirteen songs: "Do I Wanna Know?", "Brianstorm", "Dancing Shoes", "Don't Sit Down 'Cause I've Moved Your Chair", "Brick by Brick", "Fake Tales of San Francisco", "Evil Twin", "The Hellcat Spangled Shalalala", "Crying Lightning", "Fluorescent Adolescent", "Suck It and See", "I Bet You Look Good on the Dancefloor" and "R U Mine?".

14 June 2013 – 18 July 2013

1. "Do I Wanna Know?"
2. "Brianstorm"
3. "Dancing Shoes"
4. "Don't Sit Down 'Cause I've Moved Your Chair"
5. "Teddy Picker"
6. "Crying Lightning"
7. "Brick by Brick"
8. "Fake Tales of San Francisco"
9. "She's Thunderstorms"
10. "Old Yellow Bricks"
11. "Pretty Visitors"
12. "I Bet You Look Good on the Dancefloor"
13. "Do Me a Favour"
14. "R U Mine?"
15. "Mad Sounds"
16. "Fluorescent Adolescent"
17. "A Certain Romance"

Encore

18. "Cornerstone"
19. "Mardy Bum"
20. "When the Sun Goes Down"
21. "505"

Notes

- During the concert on 14 June, the order was following: "Do I Wanna Know?", "Brianstorm", "Dancing Shoes", "Teddy Picker", "Don't Sit Down 'Cause I've Moved Your Chair", "Fake Tales of San Francisco", "The View from the Afternoon", "Old Yellow Bricks", "Suck It and See", "Crying Lightning", "Pretty Visitors", "Do Me a Favour", "Cornerstone", "She's Thunderstorms", "Mad Sounds", "R U Mine?", "I Bet You Look Good on the Dancefloor", "When the Sun Goes Down", "Fluorescent Adolescent" and "505".
- On 16 June 2013, Arctic Monkeys didn't perform "Brick by Brick", and played "The View from the Afternoon" instead of "She's Thunderstorms". "Don't Sit Down 'Cause I've Moved Your Chair" was performed after "Crying Lightning" and the set ended with "Do Me a Favour", "Cornerstone", "Suck It and See", "Mad Sounds", "R U Mine?" and "When the Sun Goes Down", with "Fluorescent Adolescent" and "505" in the encore.
- During the 21 June and 22 June concerts, "Fake Tales of San Francisco" wasn't performed. "She's Thunderstorms" was performed before "Brick by Brick".
- On 23 June, "Fake Tales of San Francisco" wasn't performed.
- During the concert at Subbotnik Festival in Russia on 6 July, after "Do Me a Favour" the band performed "Evil Twin", "Fluorescent Adolescent" and "R U Mine?" at the end of main set. "Mad Sounds" and "A Certain Romance" weren't performed.
- During the concert at Rock in Roma on 10 July, the band performed "Evil Twin" after "Fake Tales of San Francisco". "Do Me a Favour", "Fluorescent Adolescent" and "R U Mine?" were performed at the end of main set. "505" was performed together with Miles Kane.
- During the concerts in Ferrara (11 July), Wiesen (13 July) and Carcassonne (15 July), Arctic Monkeys performed "Evil Twin" instead of "Fake Tales of San Francisco". "She's Thunderstorms" was played after "Old Yellow Bricks" and the main set ended with "Do Me a Favour", "Suck It and See", "Fluorescent Adolescent" and "R U Mine?".
- On 16 July and 18 July, the band performed "Evil Twin" instead of "Fake Tales of San Francisco". "She's Thunderstorms" was played after "Old Yellow Bricks" and the main set ended with "Do Me a Favour", "Cornerstone", "Suck It and See", "Fluorescent Adolescent", "R U Mine?" In the encore, Arctic Monkeys played "Mad Sounds", "When the Sun Goes Down" and "505".
- After the death of Lou Reed the band played a cover of 'Walk on the Wild Side' as their penultimate song during their concert at the Echo Arena in Liverpool on 28 October 2013

30 January 2014 – 15 February 2014

1. "Do I Wanna Know?"
2. "Brianstorm"
3. "Dancing Shoes"
4. "Evil Twin"
5. "Snap Out of It"
6. "Crying Lightning"
7. "Don't Sit Down 'Cause I've Moved Your Chair"
8. "Fireside"
9. "Reckless Serenade"
10. "Why'd You Only Call Me When You're High?"
11. "Arabella"
12. "Pretty Visitors"
13. "I Bet You Look Good on the Dancefloor"
14. "Suck It And See"
15. "Knee Socks"
16. "Fluorescent Adolescent"
17. "505"

Encore

18. "Cornerstone"
19. "One for the Road"
20. "R U Mine?"

== Tour dates ==
List of concerts, showing date, city, country, venue and support
Date	City	Country	Venue	Support
Leg 1 – USA
22 May 2013	Ventura	United States	Ventura Theatre	None
24 May 2013	George	United States	Sasquatch! Music Festival	Festival
25 May 2013	Missoula	United States	Wilma Theatre	Mini Mansions
26 May 2013	Boise	United States	Knitting Factory	Mini Mansions
28 May 2013	Denver	United States	Ogden Theatre	Mini Mansions
29 May 2013	Albuquerque	United States	Sunshine Building	Mini Mansions
31 May 2013	Dallas	United States	House of Blues	Mini Mansions
1 June 2013	Houston	United States	Free Press Summer Fest	Festival
Leg 2 – Europe (June - September 2013)
14 June 2013	Hultsfred	Sweden	Hultsfred Festival	Various
16 June 2013	Aarhus	Denmark	NorthSide Festival	Various
21 June 2013	Hilvarenbeek	Netherlands	Best Kept Secret Festival	Various
22 June 2013	Scheeßel	Germany	Hurricane Festival	Various
23 June 2013	Neuhausen ob Eck	Germany	Southside Festival	Various
25 June 2013	Zagreb	Croatia	INmusic festival	Various
28 June 2013	Pilton	England	Glastonbury Festival	Various
4 July 2013	Gdynia	Poland	Open'er Festival	Various
6 July 2013	Moscow	Russia	Subbotnik Festival	Various
10 July 2013	Rome	Italy	Rock in Roma	The Vaccines, Miles Kane
11 July 2013	Ferrara	Italy	Ferrara Under The Stars	Miles Kane
13 July 2013	Wiesen	Austria	Harvest of Art Festival	Various
15 July 2013	Carcassonne	France	Festival de Carcassonne	
16 July 2013	Gaou	France	Les Voix du Gaou	Miles Kane, The Alps
18 July 2013	Meco	Portugal	Super Bock Super Rock	Various
20 July 2013	Benicàssim	Spain	Festival Internacional de Benicàssim	Various
22 July 2013	Vienne	France	Théâtre Antique de Vienne	Miles Kane
24 July 2013	Nyon	Switzerland	Paléo Festival	Various
30 August 2013	Zürich	Switzerland	Zurich Openair	Various
1 September 2013	Stradbally	Ireland	Electric Picnic Festival	Various
7 September 2013	Istanbul	Turkey	Rock'n Coke	Various
9 September 2013	London	England	iTunes Festival	Drenge
Leg 3 – North America (September - October 2013)
15 September 2013	Toronto	Canada	Kool Haus	Drowners
16 September 2013	New York City	United States	Webster Hall	Drowners
17 September 2013	Boston	United States	Paradise Rock Club	Drowners
18 September 2013	Philadelphia	United States	Mann Center for the Performing Arts	The Walkmen
21 September 2013	Atlanta	United States	Music Midtown	Various
23 September 2013	Chicago	United States	Riviera Theatre	Twin Peaks
26 September 2013	Oakland	United States	Fox Oakland Theatre	Mini Mansions
27 September 2013	Oakland	United States	Fox Oakland Theatre	Mini Mansions
29 September 2013	Los Angeles	United States	Pellissier Building and Wiltern Theatre	Mini Mansions
30 September 2013	Los Angeles	United States	Pellissier Building and Wiltern Theatre	Mini Mansions
1 October 2013	Los Angeles	United States	Pellissier Building and Wiltern Theatre	Mini Mansions
4 October 2013	Austin	United States	Austin City Limits Music Festival	Various
5 October 2013	Baton Rouge	United States	Varsity Theatre	Deap Vally
7 October 2013	Chattanooga	United States	Track 29	Deap Vally
8 October 2013	Nashville	United States	Marathon Music Works	Deap Vally
9 October 2013	Birmingham	United States	Iron City Birmingham	Deap Vally
11 October 2013	Austin	United States	Austin City Limits Music Festival	Various
13 October 2013	Mexico City	Mexico	Corona Capital Festival	Various
Leg 4 – Europe (October - November 2013)
22 October 2013	Newcastle	England	Metro Radio Arena	The Strypes
23 October 2013	Manchester	England	Manchester Arena	The Strypes
25 October 2013	London	England	Earls Court	The Strypes
26 October 2013	London	England	Earls Court	The Strypes
28 October 2013	Liverpool	England	Liverpool Echo Arena	The Strypes
29 October 2013	Cardiff	Wales	Motorpoint Arena Cardiff	The Strypes
4 November 2013	Offenbach am Main	Germany	Stadthalle Offenbach	The Strypes
5 November 2013	Berlin	Germany	Columbiahalle	The Strypes
7 November 2013	Paris	France	Zénith de Paris	The Strypes
8 November 2013	Paris	France	Zénith de Paris	The Strypes
9 November 2013	Brussels	Belgium	Forest National	The Strypes
11 November 2013	Düsseldorf	Germany	Mitsubishi Electric Halle	The Strypes
12 November 2013	Munich	Germany	Zenith	The Strypes
13 November 2013	Milan	Italy	Mediolanum Forum	The Strypes
15 November 2013	Madrid	Spain	Palacio de los Deportes de Madrid	The Strypes
16 November 2013	Badalona (Note: Labeled as Barcelona in promotional material.)	Spain	Palau Olimpic	The Strypes
18 November 2013	Sheffield	England	Motorpoint Arena Sheffield	The Strypes
20 November 2013	Birmingham	England	LG Arena	The Strypes
21 November 2013	Glasgow	Scotland	The Hydro	The Strypes
Leg 5 – North America (December 2013 - February 2014)
1 December 2013	Vancouver	Canada	Vogue Theatre	
2 December 2013	Vancouver	Canada	Vogue Theatre	
3 December 2013	Seattle	United States	KeyArena	
4 December 2013	Portland	United States	Roseland Theater	
6 December 2013	Oakland	United States	Oracle Arena	Various
7 December 2013	Los Angeles	United States	Shrine Auditorium	
8 December 2013	San Diego	United States	Valley View Casino Center	
9 December 2013	Tempe	United States	The Marquee	
11 December 2013	Tulsa	United States	Cain's Ballroom	
12 December 2013	Columbia	United States	The Blue Note	
13 December 2013	Milwaukee	United States	The Rave	
14 December 2013	Kansas City	United States	Midland Theatre	
30 January 2014	Miami	United States	The Fillmore	The Orwells
31 January 2014	Orlando	United States	Hard Rock Live	The Orwells
1 February 2014	St. Petersburg	United States	Jannus Live	The Orwells
3 February 2014	Charlotte	United States	The Fillmore	The Orwells
4 February 2014	Richmond	United States	The National	The Orwells
6 February 2014	Boston	United States	Agganis Arena	The Orwells
7 February 2014	Portland	United States	State Theatre	The Orwells
8 February 2014	New York City	United States	Madison Square Garden	Deerhunter
10 February 2014	Covington	United States	Madison Theater	The Orwells
11 February 2014	Columbus	United States	LC Indoor Pavilion	The Orwells
12 February 2014	Detroit	United States	The Fillmore	Saint Motel
14 February 2014	Minneapolis	United States	First Avenue	Saint Motel
15 February 2014	St. Louis	United States	The Pageant	Saint Motel
Leg 6 – Australia & New Zealand
2 May 2014	Auckland	New Zealand	Vector Arena	Pond
3 May 2014	Wellington	New Zealand	TSB Bank Arena	Pond
6 May 2014	Sydney	Australia	Qantas Credit Union Arena	Pond
7 May 2014	Brisbane	Australia	Brisbane Entertainment Centre	Pond
9 May 2014	Melbourne	Australia	Rod Laver Arena	Pond
10 May 2014	Adelaide	Australia	Entertainment Centre Theatre	Pond
13 May 2014	Perth	Australia	Perth Arena	Pond
Leg 7 – Europe (May - June 2014)
23 May 2014	London	England	Finsbury Park	Tame Impala, Miles Kane, Royal Blood
24 May 2014	London	England	Finsbury Park	Tame Impala, Miles Kane, Royal Blood
6 June 2014	Bremen	Germany	Pier 2	
7 June 2014	Berlin	Germany	Zitadelle Spandau	
8 June 2014	Landgraaf	Netherlands	Pinkpop Festival	
Leg 8 – North America (June 2014)
14 June 2014	Louisville	United States	Iroquois Amphitheater	
15 June 2014	Manchester	United States	Bonnaroo Festival	
17 June 2014	Pittsburgh	United States	Stage Ae Outdoors	
18 June 2014	Lewiston	United States	Artpark	
20 June 2014	Dover	United States	Firefly Music Festival	
21 June 2014	Toronto	Canada	Molson Canadian Amphitheatre	White Denim
22 June 2014	Cleveland	United States	Jacob's Pavilion at Nautica	
24 June 2014	Indianapolis	United States	The Lawn at White River State Park	
25 June 2014	Milwaukee	United States	Summerfest	
Leg 9 – Europe (July 2014)
4 July 2014	Rotselaar	Belgium	Rock Werchter	Various
5 July 2014	Roskilde	Denmark	Roskilde Festival	Various
6 July 2014	Sopron	Hungary	VOLT Festival	Various
8 July 2014	Nîmes	France	Festival de Nîmes	Various
10 July 2014	Lisbon	Portugal	Optimus Alive!	Various
12 July 2014	Dublin	Ireland	Marlay Park	Royal Blood, Miles Kane, Jake Bugg
13 July 2014	Balado	Scotland	T in the Park	Various
16 July 2014	Villafranca di Verona	Italy	Castello Scaligero	The Kills
17 July 2014	Pistoia	Italy	Pistoia Blues Festival	The Kills
19 July 2014	Carhaix	France	Vieilles Charrues Festival	Various
Leg 10 – North America (July - August 2014)
30 July 2014	Council Bluffs	United States	Harrah's Stir Cove	
1 August 2014	Chicago	United States	Lollapalooza	Various
3 August 2014	Montreal	Canada	Osheaga Festival	Various
6 August 2014	San Diego	United States	SDSU Open Air Theatre	Barbarian
7 August 2014	Los Angeles	United States	Staples Center	Black Rebel Motorcycle Club
8 August 2014	San Francisco	United States	Outside Lands	Various
10 August 2014	Squamish	Canada	Squamish Festival	Various
11 August 2014	Seattle	United States	Paramount Theatre	The Districts
12 August 2014	Seattle	United States	Paramount Theatre	The Districts
Leg 11 – Japan
16 August 2014	Tokyo	Japan	Summersonic Festival	Various
17 August 2014	Osaka	Japan	Summersonic Festival	Various
Leg 12 – Europe (August 2014)
22 August 2014	Paris	France	Rock En Seine	Various
23 August 2014	Reading	England	Reading Festival	Various
24 August 2014	Leeds	England	Leeds Festival	Various
Leg 13 – North America (August - October 2014)
30 August 2014	Edmonton	Canada	Sonic Boom Festival	
31 August 2014	Calgary	Canada	X-Fest	
3 September 2014	Salt Lake City	United States	The Great Salt Air	Mini Mansions
4 September 2014	Denver	United States	Red Rocks Amphitheatre	Mini Mansions
5 September 2014	Kansas City	United States	Sporting Park	Mini Mansions
6 September 2014	St. Louis	United States	Lou Fest	Various
25 October 2014	Phoenix	United States	Comerica Theatre	Mini Mansions
26 October 2014	Las Vegas	United States	Life Is Beautiful Festival	Various
28 October 2014	Austin	United States	Cedar Park Center	Mini Mansions
29 October 2014	Dallas	United States	Verizon Theatre at Grand Prairie	Mini Mansions
30 October 2014	The Woodlands	United States	Cynthia Woods Mitchell Pavilion	Kan Wakan
Leg 14 – South America
4 November 2014	Bogotá	Colombia	Coliseo Cubierto el Campín	The Hives
8 November 2014	Buenos Aires	Argentina	Personal Fest – Estadio G.E.B.A.	The Hives
9 November 2014	Córdoba	Argentina	Orfeo Superdomo	The Hives
11 November 2014	Santiago	Chile	Movistar Arena	The Hives
14 November 2014	São Paulo	Brazil	Arena Anhembi	The Hives
15 November 2014	Rio de Janeiro	Brazil	HSBC Arena	The Hives

=== Box office score data ===
List of concerts, showing venue, city, tickets sold / available, gross revenue and reference(s)
Venue	City	Tickets sold / available	Gross revenue	Ref.
Paradise Rock Club	Boston	933 / 933 (100%)	$34,988	
Riviera Theatre	Chicago	2,500 / 2,500 (100%)	$85,000	
Fox Theater	Oakland	5,600 / 5,600 (100%)	$196,160	
Iron City	Birmingham	1,300 / 1,300 (100%)	$33,855	
Manchester Arena	Manchester	16,273 / 16,455 (99%)	$912,590	
Forest National	Brussels	8,000 / 8,399 (95%)	$342,935	
Agganis Arena	Boston	5,907 / 5,907 (100%)	$200,181	
Madison Square Garden	New York City	14,262 / 14,262 (100%)	$634,775	
LC Indoor Pavilion	Columbus	2,200 / 2,200 (100%)	$64,900	
Brisbane Entertainment Centre	Brisbane	10,814 / 11,180 (97%)	$911,174	
Rod Laver Arena	Melbourne	13,436 / 13,588 (99%)	$1,028,310	
Adelaide Entertainment Centre	Adelaide	2,914 / 10,000 (29%)	$224,318	
Perth Arena	Perth	12,888 / 13,067 (99%)	$1,058,430	
Pier 2	Bremen	2,911 / 2,911 (100%)	$158,491	
Zitadelle	Berlin	7,592 / 9,500 (80%)	$435,781	
Iroquois Amphitheater	Louisville	2,400 / 2,400 (100%)	$84,035	
Stage AE	Pittsburgh	5,000 / 5,000 (100%)	$162,550	
Staples Center	Los Angeles	14,549 / 14,549 (100%)	$659,407	
Arena Anhembi	São Paulo	30,140 / 30,140 (100%)	$2,380,380	
HSBC Arena	Rio de Janeiro	11,670 / 11,670 (100%)	$882,247	
Total		157,027 / 166,366 (94%)	$9,855,732	

== Tour members ==
=== Arctic Monkeys ===
- Alex Turner – lead vocals, guitar
- Jamie Cook – guitar
- Nick O'Malley – bass guitar, backing vocals
- Matt Helders – drums, percussion, backing vocals

=== Touring members ===
- Thomas Rowley – guitar, keyboards, percussion, backing vocals
- Scott Gillies – guitar, keyboards
- Davey Latter – percussion

=== Guests ===
- Bill Ryder-Jones – guitar on "Mardy Bum", "Pretty Visitors", "Piledriver Waltz", "Arabella", "I Want It All", "Fireside", "Why'd You Only Call Me When You're High?", "Snap Out Of It", "I Wanna Be Yours", "Walk On The Wild Side", "All My Loving", keyboards on "No. 1 Party Anthem" and "Knee Socks", backing vocals on "Walk On The Wild Side"
- Miles Kane – guitar on "505" and "All My Loving"
- Josh Homme – backing vocals on "Knee Socks"
