= Live at the Royal Albert Hall (Arctic Monkeys album) =

2020 live album by Arctic Monkeys

Live album by Arctic Monkeys
- Released: 4 December 2020
- Recorded: 7 June 2018
- Venue: Royal Albert Hall, London
- Length: 86:07
- Label: Domino

Arctic Monkeys chronology
Tranquility Base Hotel & Casino (2018)	Live at the Royal Albert Hall (2020)	The Car (2022)

Live at the Royal Albert Hall is a live album by English rock band Arctic Monkeys, consisting of their 7 June 2018 performance at the Royal Albert Hall in London. It was released on 4 December 2020 through Domino Recording Company, with all proceeds going to the War Child charity.

== Critical reception ==
Professional ratings
Review scores
Source	Rating
AllMusic	4.5/5 stars
Pitchfork	7.3/10
NME	5/5 stars

Leonie Cooper of NME gave the album a 5-star review, saying "it's the sound of a band who delight in defying expectations". Noah Yoo of Pitchfork gave the album 7.3 out of 10 and stated the "set leans heavily on the band's last two albums but still plays like a greatest hits". Matt Collar of AllMusic rated the album 4.5 out of 5 stars, stating the album finds the band "digging into a vibrant cross-section of material from throughout their career".

== Track listing ==
All lyrics are written by Alex Turner; all music is composed by Arctic Monkeys. (Note: Writing credits may differ from other releases)

No.	Title	Length
1.	"Four Out of Five"	5:32
2.	"Brianstorm"	3:29
3.	"Crying Lightning"	4:00
4.	"Do I Wanna Know?"	4:41
5.	"Why'd You Only Call Me When You're High?"	3:03
6.	"505"	4:35
7.	"One Point Perspective"	3:22
8.	"Do Me a Favour"	3:59
9.	"Cornerstone"	3:41
10.	"Knee Socks"	5:50
11.	"Arabella"	4:06
12.	"Tranquility Base Hotel & Casino"	4:03
13.	"She Looks Like Fun"	3:21
14.	"From the Ritz to the Rubble"	3:41
15.	"Pretty Visitors"	4:01
16.	"Don't Sit Down 'Cause I've Moved Your Chair"	3:41
17.	"I Bet You Look Good on the Dancefloor"	3:42
18.	"Star Treatment"	5:35
19.	"The View from the Afternoon"	4:24
20.	"R U Mine?"	6:11
Total length:		86:07

== Personnel ==
Personnel taken from Live at the Royal Albert Hall.

Performers

- Alex Turner – lead vocals, guitar, keyboards
- Jamie Cook – guitar, keyboards, lap steel
- Nick O'Malley – bass, backing vocals
- Matt Helders – drums, backing vocals
- Tom Rowley – guitar, keyboards, lap steel, percussion, backing vocals
- Tyler Parkford – keyboards, backing vocals
- Scott Gillies – 12-string acoustic guitar, lap steel
- Cameron Avery – acoustic guitar, keyboards, backing vocals
- Davey Latter – percussion

Technical personnel

- James Ford – mixing engineering
- Matt Colton – mastering engineering
- Red TX Audio – audio recording

Crew

- Steven G Chapman – tour management
- Ian Calder – production management
- Greta Cantos – production coordination
- Toby Plant – stage management
- Matthew Kettle – FOH audio engineering
- William Doyle – monitor engineering
- Graham Feast – lighting operation
- Scott Gillies – backline
- David Latter – backline
- Andrew Dimmack – backline
- Steven Body – backline

Artwork

- Zackery Michael – photography
- Matthew Cooper – design

== Charts ==
=== Weekly charts ===
Weekly chart performance for Live at the Royal Albert Hall
Chart (2020)	Peak position
Australian Albums (ARIA)	4
Austrian Albums (Ö3 Austria)	31
Belgian Albums (Ultratop Flanders)	5
Belgian Albums (Ultratop Wallonia)	47
Croatian International Albums (HDU)	1
Dutch Albums (Album Top 100)	5
French Albums (SNEP)	67
German Albums (Offizielle Top 100)	50
Irish Albums (Official Charts)	15
Italian Albums (FIMI)	58
Japanese Albums (Oricon)	66
Portuguese Albums (AFP)	2
Scottish Albums (Official Charts)	2
Spanish Albums (Promusicae)	20
Swiss Albums (Schweizer Hitparade)	40
UK Albums (Official Charts)	3
US Billboard 200	151
US Top Rock Albums (Billboard)	23

=== Year-end charts ===
Year-end chart performance for Live at the Royal Albert Hall
Chart (2021)	Position
Belgian Albums (Ultratop Flanders)	184
