= Favourite Worst Nightmare Tour =

2007 concert tour by Arctic Monkeys

- World tour by Arctic Monkeys
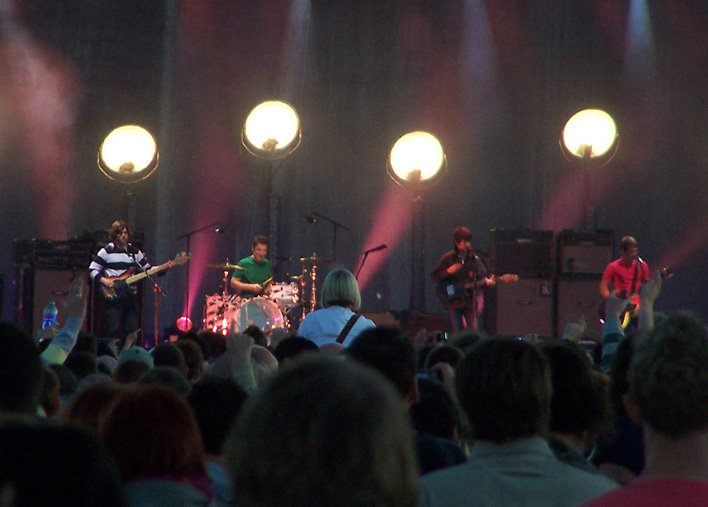
- Location: North America; Europe; South America
- Associated album: Favourite Worst Nightmare
- Start date: 10 February 2007
- End date: 17 December 2007
- No. of shows: 115

Arctic Monkeys concert chronology
- Whatever People Say I Am, That's What I'm Not Tour (2005–06); Favourite Worst Nightmare Tour (2007); Humbug Tour (2009–10)

The Favourite Worst Nightmare Tour was the second worldwide concert tour by British indie rock band Arctic Monkeys in support of their second studio album, Favourite Worst Nightmare.

The tour began from secret gig on 10 February 2007 in The Leadmill, Sheffield, England and ended on 17 December 2007 in Carling Apollo Manchester, Manchester, England. The last show of the tour was recorded for DVD At the Apollo.

During this tour, Arctic Monkeys played Glastonbury Festival in June 2007, first ever Friday at T in the Park in July 2007, two nights at Summer Sonic Tokyo Festival in Japan in August 2007, Austin City Limits Music Festival in US and Virgin Festival in Canada in September 2007 and many more shows all around the world.

== Recording ==
The group released the concert film At the Apollo on DVD on 3 November 2008. The film was directed by Richard Ayoade, and filmed on super 16mm film with cinematography by Danny Cohen. It features footage of the band performing on 17 December 2007, at their last show of the tour in Manchester's Carling Apollo. The film received the NME Award for Best Music DVD in 2009.

== Songs performed ==
Whatever People Say I Am, That's What I'm Not

- "The View from the Afternoon"
- "I Bet You Look Good on the Dancefloor"
- "Fake Tales of San Francisco"
- "Dancing Shoes"
- "You Probably Couldn't See for the Lights but You Were Staring Straight at Me" (Note: played occasionally from March to August 2007)
- "Still Take You Home"
- "Mardy Bum" (Note: played occasionally from March to September 2007)
- "When the Sun Goes Down"
- "From the Ritz to the Rubble"
- "A Certain Romance"

Favourite Worst Nightmare

- "Brianstorm"
- "Teddy Picker"
- "D Is for Dangerous"
- "Balaclava"
- "Fluorescent Adolescent"
- "Do Me a Favour"
- "This House Is a Circus"
- "If You Were There, Beware"
- "Old Yellow Bricks"
- "505" (Note: played occasionally from April to December 2007)

Non-album single

- "Leave Before the Lights Come On"

B-sides

- "Bad Woman" (Note: played on 17 December 2007) (with Richard Hawley) (Note: Credited to Richard Hawley & Death Ramps)
  (Pat Farrell and the Believers cover)
- "Da Frame 2R" (Note: added on 27 November 2007)
- "Nettles" (Note: played occasionally from September to December 2007)
- "Plastic Tramp" (Note: played on 22, 28, 29 July 2007, officially added on 8 December 2007)
- "Temptation Greets You Like Your Naughty Friend" (Note: played on 22 June 2007, 8 December 2007) (feat. Dizzee Rascal)
- "What If You Were Right the First Time?" (Note: played occasionally in February and March 2007)
- "If You Found This It's Probably Too Late" (Note: played occasionally from April to June 2007)

Covers

- "Diamonds Are Forever" by Shirley Bassey

Unreleased

- "Sandtrap" (Note: played occasionally from September to December 2007)
- "Put Me in a Terror Pocket" (Note: added on 28 November 2007)

== Set list ==
Average set list for the tour:

1. This House Is a Circus
2. Still Take You Home
3. Dancing Shoes
4. Brianstorm
5. From the Ritz to the Rubble
6. Teddy Picker
7. Balaclava
8. Fake Tales of San Francisco
9. I Bet You Look Good on the Dancefloor
10. D Is for Dangerous
11. Old Yellow Bricks
12. The View From the Afternoon
13. Fluorescent Adolescent
14. Do Me a Favour
15. When the Sun Goes Down
16. If You Were There, Beware
17. Leave Before the Lights Come On
18. A Certain Romance

== Tour dates ==
List of concerts, showing date, city, country, venue, opening acts, tickets sold, number of available tickets and amount of gross revenue
Date (2007)	City	Country	Venue	Opening acts	Attendance	Revenue
10 February	Sheffield	England	The Leadmill	—	—	—
13 February	Leicester	England	University of Leicester	—	—	—
17 February	Morecambe	England	The Dome	—	—	—
27 February	Middlesbrough	England	Middlesbrough Town Hall	—	—	—
28 February	Warrington	England	Parr Hall	—	—	—
6 March	Berlin	Germany	Fritzclub im Postbahnhof	SDNMT	—	—
8 March	Copenhagen	Denmark	Store Vega	—	—	—
10 March	Amsterdam	Netherlands	Melkweg The Max	Alamo Race Track	—	—
14 March	Paris	France	Élysée Montmartre	—	—	—
17 March	Barcelona	Spain	Razzmatazz	Les Très Bien Ensemble; Mendetz	—	—
19 March	Milan	Italy	Rolling Stone	—	—	—
29 March	Tokyo	Japan	Zepp Tokyo	747s	—	—
9 April	Southampton	England	Southampton Guildhall	The Little Flames; Gas Club	—	—
10 April	Exeter	England	Great Hall, University of Exeter	The Little Flames; Gas Club	—	—
12 April	London	England	London Astoria	The Little Flames; Gas Club	—	—
13 April	London	England	London Astoria	The Little Flames; Gas Club	—	—
14 April	Liverpool	England	Carling Academy Liverpool	The Little Flames; Gas Club	—	—
16 April	Newcastle	England	Carling Academy	The Little Flames; Gas Club	—	—
17 April	Dundee	Scotland	Caird Hall	The Little Flames; Gas Club	—	—
19 April	Glasgow	Scotland	Barrowland	The Little Flames; Gas Club	—	—
20 April	Birmingham	England	Carling Academy Birmingham	The Little Flames; Gas Club	—	—
21 April	Sheffield	England	The Leadmill	The Little Flames; Gas Club	—	—
22 April	Sheffield	England	The Leadmill	The Little Flames; Gas Club	—	—
27 April (Note: The concert on 27 April 2007 at Empire Polo Club in Indio was part of Coachella)	Indio	US	Empire Polo Club	—	—	—
29 April (Note: Secret show)	West Hollywood	US	Troubadour	—	400/400	—
1 May	San Francisco	US	The Warfield	Be Your Own Pet	—	
2 May	Portland	US	Roseland Theater	Be Your Own Pet	—	—
3 May	Seattle	US	Showbox Comedy and Supper Club	Be Your Own Pet	—	—
4 May	Vancouver	Canada	Commodore Ballroom	Be Your Own Pet	—	—
7 May	Minneapolis	US	First Avenue	Be Your Own Pet	—	—
8 May	Chicago	US	Riviera Theatre	Be Your Own Pet	—	—
9 May	Pontiac	US	Clutch Cargo's	Be Your Own Pet	—	—
11 May	Toronto	Canada	Kool Haus	Be Your Own Pet	—	—
12 May	Montreal	Canada	Olympia de Montréal	Be Your Own Pet	—	—
13 May	Boston	US	Avalon	Be Your Own Pet	—	—
15 May	New York City	US	Hammerstein Ballroom	Be Your Own Pet	—	—
16 May	Washington D. C.	US	9:30 Club	Be Your Own Pet	—	—
17 May	Philadelphia	US	Electric Factory	Be Your Own Pet	—	—
19 May	Atlanta	US	Tabernacle	Be Your Own Pet	—	—
20 May	Orlando	US	Hard Rock Live	Be Your Own Pet	—	—
27 May	Utrecht	Netherlands	Tivoli	—	—	—
28 May (Note: The concert on 28 May 2007 at Megaland was part of Pinkpop)	Landgraaf	Netherlands	Megaland	—	—	—
29 May	Luxembourg City	Luxembourg	den Atelier	—	—	—
1 June (Note: The concert on 1 June 2007 at Nürburgring was part of Rock am Ring)	Nürburg	Germany	Nürburgring	—	—	—
2 June (Note: The concert on 2 June 2007 at Nürburgring was part of Rock im Park)	Nuremberg	Germany	Zeppelinfeld	—	—	—
16 June	Malahide	Ireland	Malahide Castle	Supergrass; The Coral; Delorentos; Boss Volenti	—	—
17 June	Malahide	Ireland	Malahide Castle	Supergrass; The Coral; Delorentos; Boss Volenti	—	—
19 June	Cardiff	Wales	Cardiff International Arena	The Rascals; Reverend and the Makers	—	—
20 June	Cardiff	Wales	Cardiff International Arena	The Rascals; Reverend and the Makers	—	—
22 June (Note: The concert on 22 June 2007 at Worthy Farm was part of Glastonbury)	Pilton	England	Worthy Farm	—	—	—
25 June	Oslo	Norway	Sentrum Scene	—	—	—
26 June	Stockholm	Sweden	Globen Annexet	The Coral; Molotov Jive	—	—
28 June	Hamburg	Germany	Stadtpark Open Air	—	—	—
29 June (Note: The concert on 22 June 2007 at Festivalpark Werchter was part of Rock Werchter)	Werchter	Belgium	Werchter Festivalpark	—N/a	—N/a	—N/a
1 July (Note: The concert on 1 July 2007 at Sittertobel was part of OpenAir St. Gallen)	St. Gallen	Switzerland	Sittertobel	—N/a	—N/a	—N/a
3 July	Paris	France	Zénith Paris	The Coral	—	—
4 July	Lille	France	Zénith de Lille	—	—	—
6 July (Note: The concert on 6 July 2007 at Balado was part of T in the Park)	Kinross	Scotland	Balado	—N/a	—N/a	—N/a
8 July (Note: The concert on 8 July 2007 at Darupvej was part of Roskilde Festival)	Roskilde	Denmark	Darupvej	—N/a	—N/a	—N/a
9 July	Berlin	Germany	Columbiahalle	The Coral	—	—
10 July	Dresden	Germany	Alter Schlachthof	—	—	—
11 July	Vienna	Austria	Arena	The Coral	—	—
13 July (Note: The concert on 13 July 2007 at Parco della Pellerina was part of Traffic Festival)	Turin	Italy	Parco della Pellerina	—N/a	—N/a	—N/a
14 July (Note: The concert on 14 July 2007 at Piazza Castello was part of Ferrara Sotto Le Stelle)	Ferrara	Italy	Piazza Castello	—N/a	—N/a	—N/a
15 July (Note: The concert on 15 July 2007 in Aix Les Bains is part of Musilac)	Aix-les-Bains	France	Lac du Bourget Esplanade	—N/a	—N/a	—N/a
18 July	Lisbon	Portugal	Coliseu dos Recreios	—	—	—
19 July	Vigo	Spain	Auditorio de Castrelos	Mendetz	—	—
21 July (Note: The concert on 21 July 2007 at Recinto de festivales de Benicàssim was part of Festival Internacional de Benicàssim)	Benicàssim	Spain	Recinto de festivales de Benicàssim	—N/a	—N/a	—N/a
22 July (Note: The concert on 22 July 2007 in Nîmes is part of Festival de Nîmes)	Nîmes	France	Arena of Nîmes	—N/a	—N/a	—N/a
24 July (Note: The concert on 24 July 2007 in Nyon is part of Paléo Festival)	Nyon	Switzerland	Plaine de l'Asse	—N/a	—N/a	—N/a
28 July	Manchester	England	Old Trafford Cricket Ground	Supergrass; Amy Winehouse; The Coral; The Parrots	100,000/100,000	
29 July	Manchester	England	Old Trafford Cricket Ground	Supergrass; Amy Winehouse; The Coral; The Parrots	100,000/100,000	
3 August	Sydney	Australia	Hordern Pavilion	Operator Please	—	—
4 August	Brisbane	Australia	Tivoli	—	—	—
5 August (Note: The concert on 5 August 2007 in Byron Bay is part of Splendour in the Grass)	Byron Bay	Australia	Belongil Fields	—N/a	—N/a	—N/a
7 August 7	Melbourne	Australia	Festival Hall	—	—	—
11 August (Note: The concert on 11 August 2007 in Osaka is part of Summer Sonic Festival)	Osaka	Japan	Maishima	—N/a	—N/a	—N/a
12 August (Note: The concert on 12 August 2007 in Tokyo is part of Summer Sonic Festival)	Chiba	Japan	Chiba Marine Stadium	—N/a	—N/a	—N/a
1 September (Note: The concert on 1 September 2007 at Bar M was part of Ibiza Rocks Festival)	Ibiza	Spain	Bar M	—N/a	—N/a	—N/a
5 September	Providence	US	Lupo's Heartbreak Hotel	Voxtrot		
6 September (Note: The concert on 6 September 2007 at Rumsey Playfield was part of Central Park SummerStage)	New York City	US	Rumsey Playfield	Voxtrot	—N/a	—N/a
8 September (Note: The concert on 8 September 2007 at Toronto Island Park was part of Virgin Festival)	Toronto	Canada	Toronto Island Park	—N/a	—N/a	—N/a
9 September (Note: The concert on 9 September 2007 at Parc Jean Drapeau was part of Osheaga Festival)	Montreal	Canada	Parc Jean Drapeau	—N/a	—N/a	—N/a
11 September	Columbus	US	Newport Music Hall	Voxtrot	—	—
12 September	Chicago	US	Riviera Theatre	Voxtrot	—	—
13 September	Kansas City	US	Uptown Theater	Voxtrot	—	—
15 September	Austin	US	Zilker Park	Voxtrot	—	—
16 September	Dallas	US	Palladium Ballroom	Voxtrot	—	—
17 September	Houston	US	Verizon Wireless Theater	Voxtrot	—	—
18 September	New Orleans	US	House of Blues	Voxtrot	—	—
21 September	Tempe	US	Marquee Theatre	Voxtrot	—	—
22 September	Tucson	US	Rialto Theatre	Voxtrot	—	—
23 September (Note: The concert on 23 September 2007 at Coors Amphitheatre was part of San Diego Street Scene)	Chula Vista	US	Coors Amphitheatre	—N/a	—N/a	—N/a
25 September	Los Angeles	US	Hollywood Palladium	Voxtrot	—	—
27 September	San Francisco	US	Bill Graham Civic Auditorium	Voxtrot	—	—
28 September	Eugene	US	McDonald Theatre	Voxtrot	—	—
29 September	Seattle	US	Paramount Theatre	Voxtrot	—	—
30 September	Vancouver	Canada	PNE Forum	Voxtrot	—	—
24 October	Buenos Aires	Argentina	Estadio Luna Park	Bicycletas	—	—
26 October (Note: The concert on 26 October 2007 at Marina da Glória was part of TIM Festival Rio)	Rio de Janeiro	Brazil	Marina da Glória	—N/a	—N/a	—N/a
28 October (Note: The concert on 28 October 2007 at Arena Skol Anhembi was part of TIM Festival Sao Paulo)	São Paulo	Brazil	Arena Skol Anhembi	—N/a	—N/a	—N/a
31 October (Note: The concert on 31 October 2007 at Pedreira Paulo Leminski was part of TIM Festival Curitiba)	Curitiba	Brazil	Pedreira Paulo Leminski	—N/a	—N/a	—N/a
27 November	Rezé	France	La Trocardière	—	—	—
28 November	Tournefeuille	France	Le Phare	Reverend and the Makers	—	—
30 November	Madrid	Spain	La Riviera	—	—	—
1 December	Barcelona	Spain	Espacio Movistar	—	—	—
3 December	Cologne	Germany	Palladium	—	—	—
6 December	Amsterdam	Netherlands	Heineken Music Hall	—	—	—
8 December	London	England	Alexandra Palace	The Rascals; The Horrors	—	—
9 December	London	England	Alexandra Palace	The Rascals; The Horrors	—	—
11 December	Manchester	England	Manchester Central	The Rascals; The Horrors	—	—
12 December	Manchester	England	Manchester Central	The Rascals; The Horrors	—	—
14 December	Aberdeen	Scotland	Aberdeen Exhibition and Conference Centre	The Rascals; The Horrors	—	—
15 December	Aberdeen	Scotland	Aberdeen Exhibition and Conference Centre	The Rascals; The Horrors	—	—
17 December	Manchester	England	Carling Apollo Manchester	The Rascals	—	—

== Personnel ==
Arctic Monkeys

- Alex Turner – lead vocals, guitar, keyboards
- Jamie Cook – guitar, backing vocals
- Nick O'Malley – bass guitar, backing vocals
- Matt Helders – drums, backing vocals

Guests

- Miles Kane – guitar on "Plastic Tramp" and "505"
- Dizzee Rascal – rap vocals on "Temptation Greets You Like Your Naughty Friend"
- James Ford – keyboards on "Diamonds Are Forever"
- Tom Rowley – guitar on "505" (at T in The Park concert)
- Richard Hawley – lead vocals, tambourine on "Bad Woman"
