= Humbug (album) =

2009 studio album by Arctic Monkeys

Studio album by Arctic Monkeys
- Released: 19 August 2009
- Recorded: November 2008 – April 2009
- Studios: Pink Duck, Burbank; Rancho De La Luna, Joshua Tree; Mission Sound, New York City
- Genres: Psychedelic rock; stoner rock; desert rock; gothic rock
- Length: 39:15
- Label: Domino
- Producers: Josh Homme; James Ford

Arctic Monkeys chronology
At the Apollo (2008)	Humbug (2009)	Suck It and See (2011)

Singles from Humbug
- 1. "Crying Lightning" Released: 6 July 2009; 2. "Cornerstone" Released: 16 November 2009; 3. "My Propeller" Released: 22 March 2010

Humbug is the third studio album by the English rock band Arctic Monkeys, first released in Japan on 19 August 2009 and in the United Kingdom on 24 August 2009 through Domino Recording Company. The band started to write new material for the album towards the end of summer 2008 and finished it entirely in spring 2009.

Wholly recorded in the United States, the band worked with American musician Josh Homme, who produced tracks recorded in Los Angeles and Joshua Tree, California at Rancho De La Luna, alongside New York City recordings produced by James Ford. Musically, the album is a departure from the garage rock and punk-influenced sound of the band's previous work, incorporating elements of stoner rock, desert rock, surf rock, and ambient tones. Homme has been credited by writers for introducing the album's darker sound. Frontman Alex Turner's vocals on the album are noted as a drastic change from the frenetic and upbeat delivery of Arctic Monkeys' previous albums to a slower and more hushed approach. Turner's songwriting also is a departure from his kitchen-sink realism poetry, instead being replaced by analogy.

Like their previous albums, Humbug debuted at number one in the United Kingdom and has since been certified platinum. The album's release preceded the band's headlining performances at the Reading and Leeds Festivals at the end of that week. It received generally positive reviews, though it did not receive the same acclaim that their first two albums achieved. Critics noted that the band expanded their sound and themes, while the album's tone was recognised as darker than the band's previous records. Retrospectively, Humbug is considered one of the band's most important records, with many noting it as containing various musical styles and lyrical themes the band would further explore on later releases.

== Recording ==
The band started writing songs for the album towards the end of summer 2008, with lead singer Alex Turner suggesting that the inspiration for the first few guitar riffs came while the band were attending the Latitude Festival in Suffolk. Tracks were written through the end of 2008, with recording taking place around the band's touring schedule towards late 2008 and early 2009. After sharing the demos with Domino founder Laurence Bell, they asked him for guidance as they wanted a new approach to the music, Bell suggested they reached out to Josh Homme, who they had mentioned before although jokingly. Homme heard the demos and accepted to co-produce the album, the album was wholly recorded in the United States. Homme-produced tracks recorded in Los Angeles and the Mojave Desert alongside New York City recordings which happened in March 2009, produced – as per the second album – by James Ford, who also produced the album The Age of the Understatement by Turner's side-project The Last Shadow Puppets.

While recording the album, the band incorporated a wide variety of instruments that they had not used previously. Baritone and slide guitars can be heard throughout the album, as well as new guitar effects. The guitar playing on the album has a desert/surf tone. The presence of a variety of keyboards on almost every track was something new for the band, with lead singer Alex Turner recording all of them himself with the exception of the album's singles, which were handled by session and touring keyboardist John Ashton. While being interviewed for the BBC's The Culture Show, Turner and Matt Helders cited Jimi Hendrix, Cream, Jake Thackray, John Cale, Nick Cave, Roky Erickson and the Beatles as influences on the recording of the album.

== Composition ==
The album's tone is more relaxed than the band's "aggressive" previous records. Robin Murray of Clash notes that a "spooky carnivalesque atmosphere permeates the album; there's the recurring waltzer organ, the circus-like marching drums, and of course the bellowing ringmaster, luring us all into the dark and devilish delights of what's in store." Homme has been credited by writers for introducing the album's darker sound. Murray further notes Turner's voice as transitioning from "breakneck reality bites" into a dark, deep and hushed singing voice. According to Mike Driver in his BBC Music review, "Humbug embraces the true nature of album-craft by sequencing ten tracks in such a way that coherence and consistency bind constituent pieces into a single, enjoyably sombre whole." Driver also notes that "Kitchen-sink realism poetry's replaced by rampant analogies, characters of the everyday transformed into otherworldly denizens with wicked intentions. Turner still spills syllables rather too swiftly at times [...] but largely a slow-and-steady approach prevails, mirrored by the music's assured shuffle." Murray highlights that the two most distinct features that dominate Humbug are "the smoky trembling guitar" and Turner's matured croon.

Musically, Humbug has been described as psychedelic rock, hard rock, stoner rock, gothic rock, and desert rock.

== Release ==
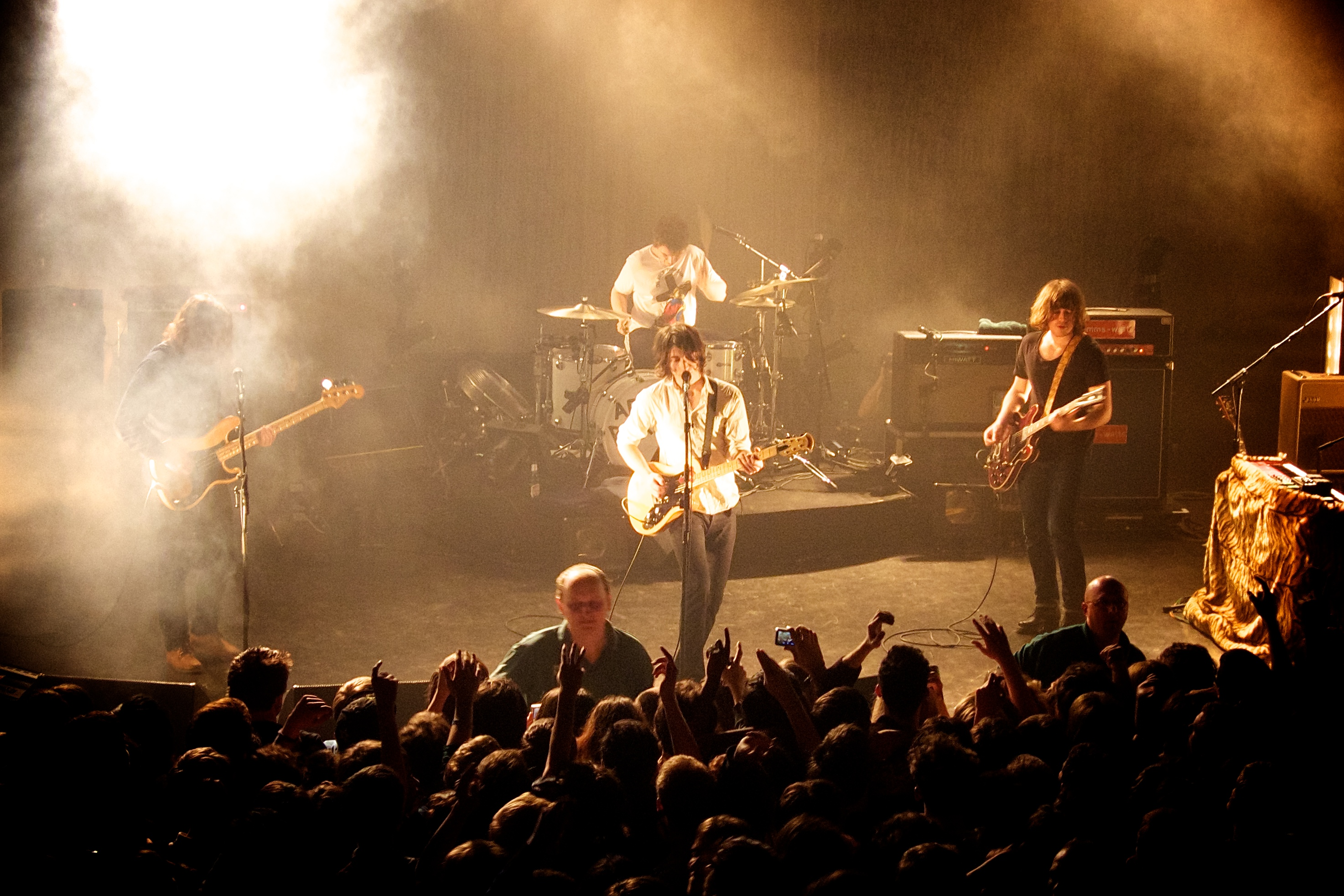
Arctic Monkeys performing in London on the Humbug Tour, March 2010

Early soundbites of tracks from the album appeared in the band's periodical video diary on YouTube. The first single of the album was "Crying Lightning". It was released on 6 July, when it was played on BBC Radio 1 and was available for download from iTunes after midnight that day. On 4 October 2009 the band's official website announced the second single from the album would be "Cornerstone".

On 1 February 2010, the third single from the album was announced to be "My Propeller", which was released on 22 March. Similar to other singles from the album, it was released on 7" and as an exclusive 10" vinyl available only in Oxfam shops. The B-sides on the 10" vinyl were "Joining the Dots", "The Afternoon's Hat" and "Don't Forget Whose Legs You're On", with just "Joining the Dots" available as a B-side on the 7" version.

Like their previous release, Favourite Worst Nightmare (2007), Humbug was released first in Japan on 19 August 2009, followed by Australia, Brazil, Ireland and Germany, on 21 August 2009. It was then released in the UK on 24 August 2009, in the US the following day and in Greece on 31 August. "I Haven't Got My Strange" was included as an iTunes bonus track, while a cover of "Red Right Hand" by Nick Cave and the Bad Seeds was included as a bonus track on the Japanese release. Upon release, the album sold over 96,000 copies in its first week in the UK, topping the UK Albums Chart. By September 2013, the album had sold 320,921 copies in the UK.

Arctic Monkeys embarked on the first leg of the worldwide Humbug Tour in January 2009 and went on to headline 2009's Reading and Leeds Festivals. During this performance, they played a number of songs from Humbug, plus older tracks and a cover of Nick Cave and the Bad Seeds' "Red Right Hand". They were also the headline act on the first night of 2009's Exit festival in Serbia. In North America, where they had less of a following, they played abridged sets at Montreal's Osheaga Festival, as well as New Jersey's All Points West Music and Arts Festival. The tour finished in early 2010 in Mexico.

== Reception ==
Professional ratings
Aggregate scores
Source	Rating
AnyDecentMusic?	7.4/10
Metacritic	75/100
Review scores
Source	Rating
AllMusic	3.5/5 stars
The A.V. Club	C+
The Daily Telegraph	4/5 stars
Entertainment Weekly	B+
The Guardian	4/5 stars
MSN Music (Consumer Guide)	B
NME	7/10
Pitchfork	7.2/10
Rolling Stone	4/5 stars
Spin	6/10

Humbug received generally positive reviews from critics, albeit less positive than its two predecessors. It received a rating of 75 out of 100 on Metacritic based on 26 critic reviews. While overall response was positive, the album was criticised by some for not containing the same hooks that the band had become known for, with Spin's Sean Fennessey calling the album "accomplished, but not particularly infectious."

Jason Lipshutz of Billboard stated that the band "justif[ies] the hype by shifting its best qualities into different, equally dazzling shapes." John Mulvey of Uncut felt that "Homme's role as producer, perhaps, has been to nurture the soundscaping that was attempted on Humbug's predecessor, and, critically, to encourage a sense of space and stealth." In his positive review of the album, Joe Tangari of Pitchfork noted that "Humbug isn't better than either of its predecessors, but it expands the group's range and makes me curious where it might go next. It also demonstrates a great deal of staying power for a band that could have imploded before it ever got this far." Stephen Thomas Erlewine of AllMusic gave Humbug a positive review. Although he found it overall wasn't as accessible as its two predecessors, he noted that the band were beginning to push their limits in regards to creativity, and composing music carefree of whether or not they were successful in America. He further noted that opinion towards the album might change retrospectively: "the record may mean more in the long-term than it does on its own."

In retrospect, Humbug has been considered an important piece in Arctic Monkeys' catalogue, having introduced a variety of new styles and themes, both lyrically and musically, to the band that they have expanded on since its release. It marked the first time they recorded material under Queens of the Stone Age frontman Josh Homme's influence. In an NME article, Mike Williams writes, "If Arctic Monkeys had never walked into the desert with Josh Homme to record 'Humbug' in 2009, they could never have made 'AM'. 'Humbug' was as much about subverting people's impressions of who the band were as it was an album in its own right." In 2011, Turner said Humbug "is as important, if not more so [compared to the first two records], on our journey of getting to where we are right now." Nevertheless, Humbug remains the band's most polarising album. Both NME and Consequence of Sound ranked Humbug the band's weakest release thus far in 2015 and 2018, respectively. While both acknowledged the album's position in the band's discography, NME nevertheless stated: "In retrospect, it feels more like an important bridge between the youthful vim of old and the meatier material that would come than a destination." Consequence of Sound wrote that Humbug paved the way for songwriting evolution seen in the band's follow-up efforts Suck It and See (2011) and AM. Conversely, both the Evening Standard and The Independent, in 2018 and 2019, respectively, argue that Humbug is Arctic Monkeys' greatest album, with the former stating that the record was the band's "most accomplished collection of tracks yet, which captured the sound of a band at the peak of their creative powers."

== Track listing ==
All lyrics are written by Alex Turner, all music is written by Arctic Monkeys.

No.	Title	Producer	Length
1.	"My Propeller"	James Ford	3:27
2.	"Crying Lightning"	Josh Homme	3:43
3.	"Dangerous Animals"	Homme	3:30
4.	"Secret Door"	Ford	3:43
5.	"Potion Approaching"	Homme	3:32
6.	"Fire and the Thud"	Homme	3:57
7.	"Cornerstone"	Ford	3:17
8.	"Dance Little Liar"	Homme	4:43
9.	"Pretty Visitors"	Homme	3:40
10.	"The Jeweller's Hands"	Homme	5:43
Total length:			39:15

iTunes bonus track
No.	Title	Length
11.	"I Haven't Got My Strange"	1:29

Japanese bonus tracks
No.	Title	Writer(s)	Length
12.	"Red Right Hand" (Nick Cave and the Bad Seeds cover)	Mick Harvey; Nick Cave; Thomas Wydler	4:19

== Personnel ==
Personnel taken from Humbug's liner notes, except where noted.

Arctic Monkeys

- Alex Turner – lead vocals, guitar, keyboards
- Jamie Cook – guitar
- Nick O'Malley – bass guitar, backing vocals
- Matt Helders – drums, backing vocals

Additional musicians

- Joshua Homme – backing vocals
- John Ashton – keyboards (tracks 1, 2, 7), backing vocals (tracks 1, 2)
- Alison Mosshart – additional vocals (track 6)

Technical

- Joshua Homme – production (tracks 2, 3, 5, 6, 8–10)
- James Ford – production (tracks 1, 4, 7, 11)
- Alain Johannes – engineering
- Justin Smith – engineering assistance (tracks 2, 3, 5, 6, 8–10)
- Claudius Mittendorfer – additional engineering (tracks 2, 5)
- Rich Costey – mixing
- Howie Weinberg – mastering

Artwork

- Guy Aroch – cover photography, booklet photography
- Chapman Baehler – booklet photography
- Mark Bull – booklet photography
- Justin Smith – booklet photography

== Charts ==
2009 weekly chart performance
Chart (2009)	Peak position
Australian Albums (ARIA)	2
Austrian Albums (Ö3 Austria)	7
Belgian Albums (Ultratop Flanders)	1
Belgian Albums (Ultratop Wallonia)	4
Canadian Albums (Billboard)	6
Danish Albums (Hitlisten)	4
Dutch Albums (Album Top 100)	2
Finnish Albums (Suomen virallinen lista)	11
French Albums (SNEP)	2
German Albums (Offizielle Top 100)	4
Greek Albums (IFPI)	17
Irish Albums (IRMA)	1
Italian Albums (FIMI)	17
Japanese Albums (Oricon)	3
Mexican Albums (Top 100 Mexico)	23
New Zealand Albums (RMNZ)	3
Norwegian Albums (VG-lista)	7
Polish Albums (ZPAV)	49
Portuguese Albums (AFP)	7
Scottish Albums (Official Charts)	1
Spanish Albums (Promusicae)	5
Swedish Albums (Sverigetopplistan)	12
Swiss Albums (Schweizer Hitparade)	7
UK Albums (Official Charts)	1
US Billboard 200	15
US Independent Albums (Billboard)	1
US Top Alternative Albums (Billboard)	4

2026 weekly chart performance
Chart (2026)	Peak position
Croatian International Albums (HDU)	19

== Certifications and sales ==
Sales certifications
Region	Certification	Certified units/sales
Canada (Music Canada)	Gold	40,000^{‡}
United Kingdom (BPI)	Platinum	513,000
^{‡} Sales+streaming figures based on certification alone.

== Release history ==
Dates from Arctic Monkeys website
Country	Date	Label
Japan	19 August 2009	Domino
Australia	21 August 2009	Domino
Austria	21 August 2009	Domino
Brazil	21 August 2009	Domino
Ireland	21 August 2009	Domino
Germany	21 August 2009	Domino
Switzerland	21 August 2009	Domino
United Kingdom	24 August 2009	Domino
Canada	25 August 2009	Domino
United States	25 August 2009	Domino
Finland	26 August 2009	Domino
Sweden	26 August 2009	Domino
Italy	28 August 2009	Domino
Greece	31 August 2009	Domino
Turkey	31 August 2009	Domino
