= Arctic Monkeys =

English rock band

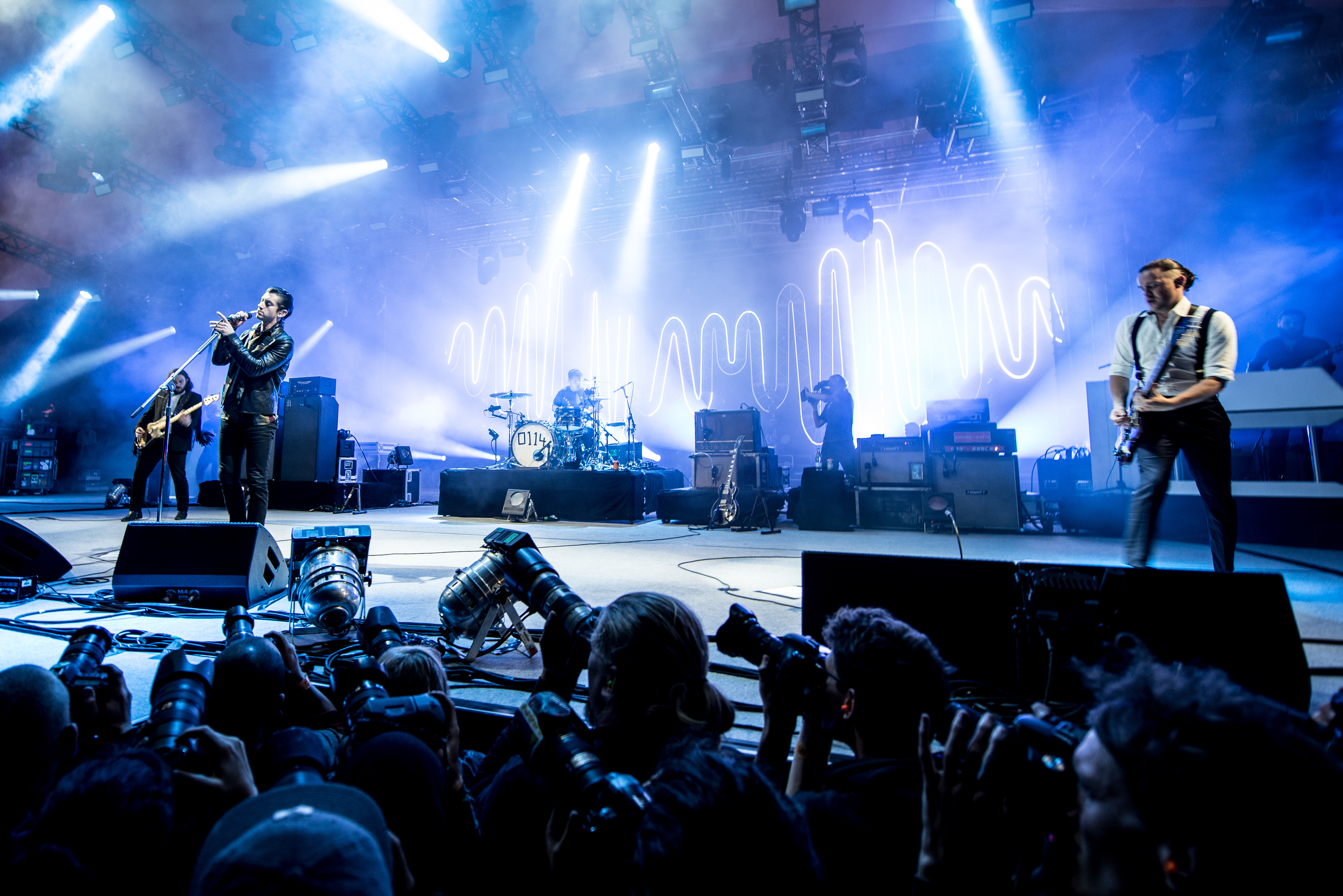
- Arctic Monkeys performing at the Roskilde Festival in 2014. From left to right: Nick O'Malley, Alex Turner, Matt Helders and Jamie Cook

Background information
- Also known as: Death Ramps
- Origin: Sheffield, England
- Genres: Indie rock; garage rock; post-punk revival; psychedelic rock; alternative rock; lounge pop
- Works: Albums and singles; songs
- Years active: 2002–present
- Labels: Domino; Warner
- Spinoffs: The Last Shadow Puppets; Mongrel
- Members: Matt Helders; Alex Turner; Jamie Cook; Nick O'Malley
- Past members: Andy Nicholson
- Website: arcticmonkeys.com

Arctic Monkeys are an English rock band formed in Sheffield in 2002. They comprise lead singer and guitarist Alex Turner, drummer Matt Helders, guitarist Jamie Cook and bassist Nick O'Malley, who replaced co-founder and original bassist Andy Nicholson in 2006. Though initially associated with the short-lived landfill indie movement, Arctic Monkeys were one of the earliest bands to come to public attention via the Internet, during the emerging "blog rock" era. Commentators have suggested that this period marked a shift in how new bands were promoted and marketed.

Their debut album, Whatever People Say I Am, That's What I'm Not (2006), received acclaim and topped the UK Albums Chart, becoming the fastest-selling debut album in British chart history at the time. It won Best British Album at the 2007 Brit Awards and has been hailed as one of the greatest debut albums. Its follow-up, Favourite Worst Nightmare (2007), was also acclaimed and won Best British Album at the 2008 Brit Awards. Humbug (2009) and Suck It and See (2011) received positive but weaker reviews.

The band achieved wider international fame with their acclaimed fifth album AM (2013), which was supported by the global hit "Do I Wanna Know?". AM topped four Billboard charts and was certified 4× Platinum in the US. At the 2014 Brit Awards, it became the third Arctic Monkeys album to win British Album of the Year. The band switched to a softer, more piano-driven sound for their following albums, Tranquility Base Hotel & Casino (2018) and The Car (2022). Both received Grammy nominations for Best Alternative Music Album, while The Car also received nominations for the Ivor Novello Awards and the Mercury Prize in 2023.

Arctic Monkeys' sales in the US alone stand at over 30 million units, according to the Recording Industry Association of America (RIAA). In the United Kingdom, they became the first independent-label band to debut at number one in the UK with their first five albums. They have won seven Brit Awards, winning Best British Group and British Album of the Year three times, becoming the first band to ever "do the double"—that is, win in both categories—three times; a Mercury Prize for Whatever People Say I Am, That's What I'm Not; an Ivor Novello Award and 20 NME Awards. They have been nominated for nine Grammy Awards, and received Mercury Prize nominations in 2007, 2013, 2018 and 2023. Both Whatever People Say I Am, That's What I'm Not and AM are included in NME and different editions of Rolling Stone's lists of the "500 Greatest Albums of All Time".

== History ==
=== 2002–2005: Early years and record deal ===
"Ravey Ravey Ravey Club"
A recording of an early unreleased track, "Ravey Ravey Ravey Club", from Arctic Monkeys' first gig at the Grapes pub in Sheffield, in June 2003

Arctic Monkeys were formed in mid-2002 by friends Alex Turner, Matt Helders, and Andy Nicholson (who left the band shortly after their debut album, Whatever People Say I Am, That's What I'm Not, was released). Turner and Helders were neighbours and close friends, and they met Nicholson in secondary school. Turner, who had grown up in a musical household as his father was a music teacher, played guitar in the then-instrumental-only band, with Helders on drums, Nicholson on bass and a new band member, Jamie Cook, as a second guitarist. Initially, Turner was reluctant when it came to being the lead singer. As time passed, Turner became the lead singer and frontman of the band as he had "a thing for words", according to Helders.

The band began rehearsing at Yellow Arch Studios in Neepsend, and played its first gig on 13 June 2003 at The Grapes in Sheffield city centre. After a few performances in 2003, the band began to record demos at 2fly studios in Sheffield. 18 songs were demoed in all and the collection, now known as Beneath the Boardwalk, was burned onto CDs to give away at gigs, which were promptly file-shared amongst fans. The name Beneath the Boardwalk originated when the first batch of demos were sent around. The first sender, wanting to classify the demos, named them after where he received them, the Boardwalk. Slowly, as more demos were spread, they were all classified under this name. This has led to many people falsely believing that Beneath the Boardwalk was an early album, or that the early demos were all released under this title. The group did not mind the distribution, saying "we never made those demos to make money or anything. We were giving them away free anyway – that was a better way for people to hear them."

The band began to grow in popularity across the north of England, receiving attention from BBC Radio and the British tabloid press. A local amateur photographer, Mark Bull, filmed the band's performances and made the music video "Fake Tales of San Francisco", releasing it on his website, alongside the contents of Beneath the Boardwalk – a collection of the band's songs which he named after a local music venue. When asked about the popularity of the band's MySpace site, the band said that they were unaware of what it was and that the site had originally been created by their fans. In May 2005, Arctic Monkeys released the EP Five Minutes with Arctic Monkeys on their own 'Bang Bang' label, featuring the songs "Fake Tales of San Francisco" and "From the Ritz to the Rubble". This release was limited to 500 CDs and 1,000 7" records, but was also available to download from the iTunes Music Store. Soon after, the band played at the Carling Stage of the Reading and Leeds Festivals, reserved for less known or unsigned bands.

Eventually, they were signed to Domino in June 2005. The band said they were attracted to the DIY ethic of Domino owner Laurence Bell, who ran the label from his flat and only signed bands that he liked personally. The UK's Daily Star reported that this was followed in October by a £1 million publishing deal with EMI and a £725,000 contract with Epic Records for the United States. Arctic Monkeys denied this on their website, dubbing the newspaper "The Daily Stir". However, Domino had licensed the Australian and New Zealand publishing rights to EMI and the Japanese rights to independent label Hostess. Their debut single, "I Bet You Look Good on the Dancefloor", which was recorded at Chapel Studios in Lincolnshire, was released on 17 October 2005 and went straight to No. 1 on the UK singles chart. Their second single, "When the Sun Goes Down" (previously titled "Scummy"), released on 16 January 2006, also went straight to No. 1. The band's success with little marketing or advertising led some to suggest that it could signal a change in how new bands achieve recognition.

=== 2006: Whatever People Say I Am, That's What I'm Not ===
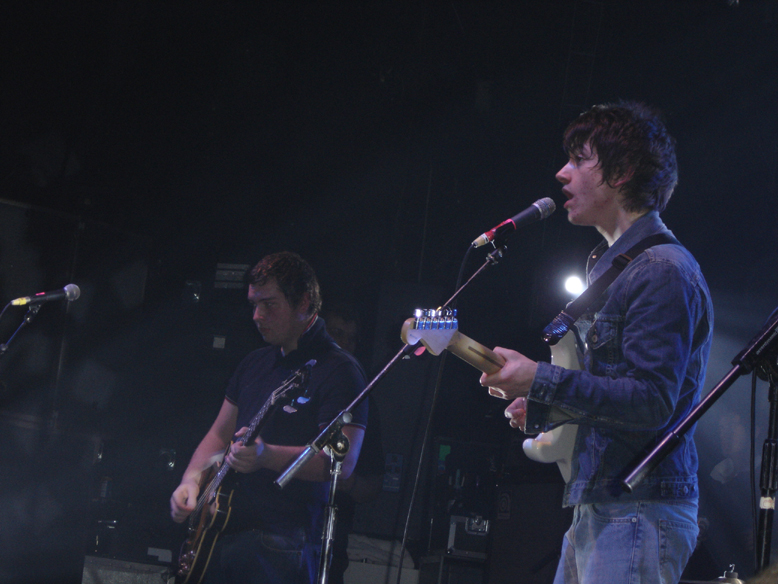
Arctic Monkeys performing in 2006

The band finished recording their debut album, Whatever People Say I Am, That's What I'm Not, at Chapel Studios in Lincolnshire in January 2006 with British record producer Jim Abbiss producing. Whatever People Say I Am, That's What I'm Not became the fastest-selling debut album in UK chart history, selling 363,735 copies in the first week. This surpassed the previous record of 306,631 copies held by Popstars by Hear'Say and sold more copies on its first day alone – 118,501 – than the rest of the Top 20 albums combined. The cover sleeve of Whatever People Say I Am, That's What I'm Not, showing Chris McClure, a friend of the band smoking a cigarette, was criticised by the head of the NHS in Scotland for "reinforcing the idea that smoking is okay". The image on the CD itself is a shot of an ashtray full of cigarettes. The band's product manager denied the accusation and suggested the opposite – "You can see from the image smoking is not doing him the world of good".

The record was released a month later in the US on 21 February 2006 and entered at No. 24 on the Billboard album chart after it sold 34,000 units in its first week, making it the second fastest selling debut indie rock album in America. However, US sales for the first year did not match those of the first week in the UK for the album. US critics were more reserved about the band than their UK counterparts and appeared unwilling to be drawn into the possibility of "yet another example of the UK's press over-hyping new bands". However, the band's June 2006 tour of North America received critical acclaim at each stop – the hype surrounding them "proven to exist for good reason". The album was certified Gold by the RIAA in 2017 for selling over 500,000 units in the United States. Meanwhile, the UK's NME magazine declared the band's debut album the "5th greatest British album of all time". It also equalled the record of the Strokes and Oasis at the 2006 NME Awards, winning three fan-voted awards for Best British Band, Best New Band and Best Track for "I Bet You Look Good on the Dancefloor".

Arctic Monkeys wasted no time in recording new material and released Who the Fuck Are Arctic Monkeys?, a five-track EP on 24 April 2006. Due to its length, the EP was ineligible to chart as a UK single or album. Furthermore, the record's graphic language has resulted in significantly less radio airplay than previous records, although this was not a reported concern according to an insider – "since they made their name on the Internet... they don't care if they don't get radio play". The release of the EP Who the Fuck Are Arctic Monkeys? Just three months after their record-breaking debut album has been criticised by some, who have seen it as "money-grabbing" and "cashing in on their success". The band countered that it regularly releases new music not to make money, but to avoid the "boredom" of "spending three years touring on one album".

Soon after the release of the EP in the UK, the band announced that Andy Nicholson would not take part in the band's forthcoming North America tour due to fatigue from "an intensive period of touring". On returning to the UK, Nicholson confirmed that he would leave Arctic Monkeys and start his own project. He also said that he couldn't deal with the band's fame and success over the previous six months. In a statement on their official website, the band said: "We are sad to tell everyone that Andy is no longer with the band", also confirmed that Nick O'Malley – former bassist with the Dodgems who had drafted in as temporary bassist for the tour – would continue as bassist for the rest of their summer tour schedule. Shortly after, Nick O'Malley was confirmed as the formal replacement for Nicholson.

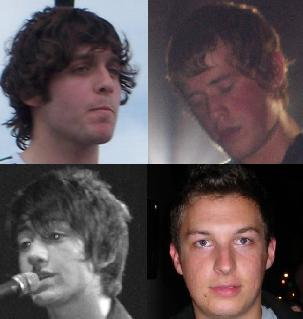
Headshots of the current line-up; clockwise from top left: Nick O'Malley, Jamie Cook, Matt Helders, Alex Turner

Arctic Monkeys' first release without Nicholson, the single "Leave Before the Lights Come On", came on 14 August 2006. Turner said that the song was one of the last songs he wrote before their rise to fame and suggested that "it feels very much like it could be on the album". Peaking at No. 4 in the UK, the single became the band's first single not to reach No. 1. The band was re-united at the Leeds Festival when Nicholson met up with his former bandmates and his replacement bassist, O'Malley. Only the original band members, minus Nicholson, were present at the award ceremony when Whatever People Say I Am, That's What I'm Not won the 2006 Mercury Prize two weeks later.

=== 2007: Favourite Worst Nightmare ===
The band's second album, Favourite Worst Nightmare, was released on 23 April 2007, a week after the release of accompanying single "Brianstorm". Like its predecessor, Favourite Worst Nightmare quickly reached No. 1 in the album charts. Turner described the songs as "very different from last time", adding that the sound of some tracks are "a bit full-on – a bit like "From the Ritz to the Rubble", "The View from the Afternoon", that sort of thing". A secret gig played at Sheffield's Leadmill on 10 February 2007, debuted seven new songs (six from Favourite Worst Nightmare and one other). Early reviews of the release were positive and described it as "very, very fast and very, very loud".

Meanwhile, the band continued to pick up awards from around the world, namely the Best New Artist in the United States at the PLUG Independent Music Awards, the Album of the Year awards in Japan, Ireland and the US, awards for Best Album and Best Music DVD for the short film Scummy Man at the 2007 NME Awards. It ended the year by clinching the Best British Band and Best British Album at the 2008 BRIT Awards. For the second year in a row, the band was nominated for the annual Mercury Prize.

On 29 April 2007, the day Favourite Worst Nightmare charted at No. 1 in the UK Albums Chart, all 12 tracks from the album charted in the Top 200 of the UK singles chart. The band later released "Fluorescent Adolescent" as a single, and it charted at No. 5, after debuting the song live on The Jonathan Ross Show dressed as clowns. The third single from Favourite Worst Nightmare, "Teddy Picker", was released on 3 December 2007. It charted at No. 20 and remained only one week in the top 40 staying in this position, making it the lowest charting single for the band so far. Prior to this release the band released an extremely limited number of 250 vinyls under the pseudonym Death Ramps containing two of the B-sides from the "Teddy Picker" single.

In its first week of release the album sold 227,993 copies, emulating Whatever People Say I Am, That's What I'm Not in going straight to number one in the UK Albums Chart, albeit selling 130,000 copies fewer than their record-breaking debut. The first two singles from the album "Brianstorm" and "Fluorescent Adolescent" were both UK Top Hits. Favourite Worst Nightmare's first day sales of 85,000 outsold the rest of the Top 20 combined, while all twelve tracks from the album entered the top 200 of the UK singles chart in their own right. By September 2013 the album has sold 821,128 copies in UK and has since gone 3× platinum by 2018. In the USA, the album debuted at number seven, selling around 44,000 copies in its first week.

Arctic Monkeys headlined the Glastonbury Festival on 22 June 2007, the highlights of which were aired on BBC2. During their headline act, the band performed with Dizzee Rascal and Simian Mobile Disco and covered Shirley Bassey's "Diamonds Are Forever". The band also played a large gig at Dublin's Malahide Castle on 16 June 2007, with a second date added the following day. On 28–29 July 2007 the band played their biggest concert to date with two sell out shows at the 55,000 capacity Old Trafford Cricket Ground in Manchester. Billed as being the group's own 'mini-festivals' both dates saw support sets for Supergrass, The Coral, Amy Winehouse and Japanese Beatles tribute act The Parrots. The shows were hailed as 'the gigs of a generation' by NME and were even compared to Oasis' record-breaking shows at Knebworth House in 1996. The LCCG concerts cemented Arctic Monkeys' status as the defining band of their generation, as Oasis had done before them. The band was also slated to play the Austin City Limits Music Festival in September 2007. Other European festivals include Rock Werchter in 2007. The band played two shows at Cardiff International Arena on 19 and 20 June 2007. They also played two London gigs at Alexandra Palace on 8 and 9 December 2007. On 1 September 2007 the band performed an intimate show at Ibiza Rocks show in Bar M (now Ibiza Rocks Bar) along with Reverend and the Makers. The band played their last show of the tour on 17 December 2007 at Manchester Apollo, which was filmed for the live album and video release At the Apollo, which was released in cinemas the following year.

=== 2008–2010: Humbug ===
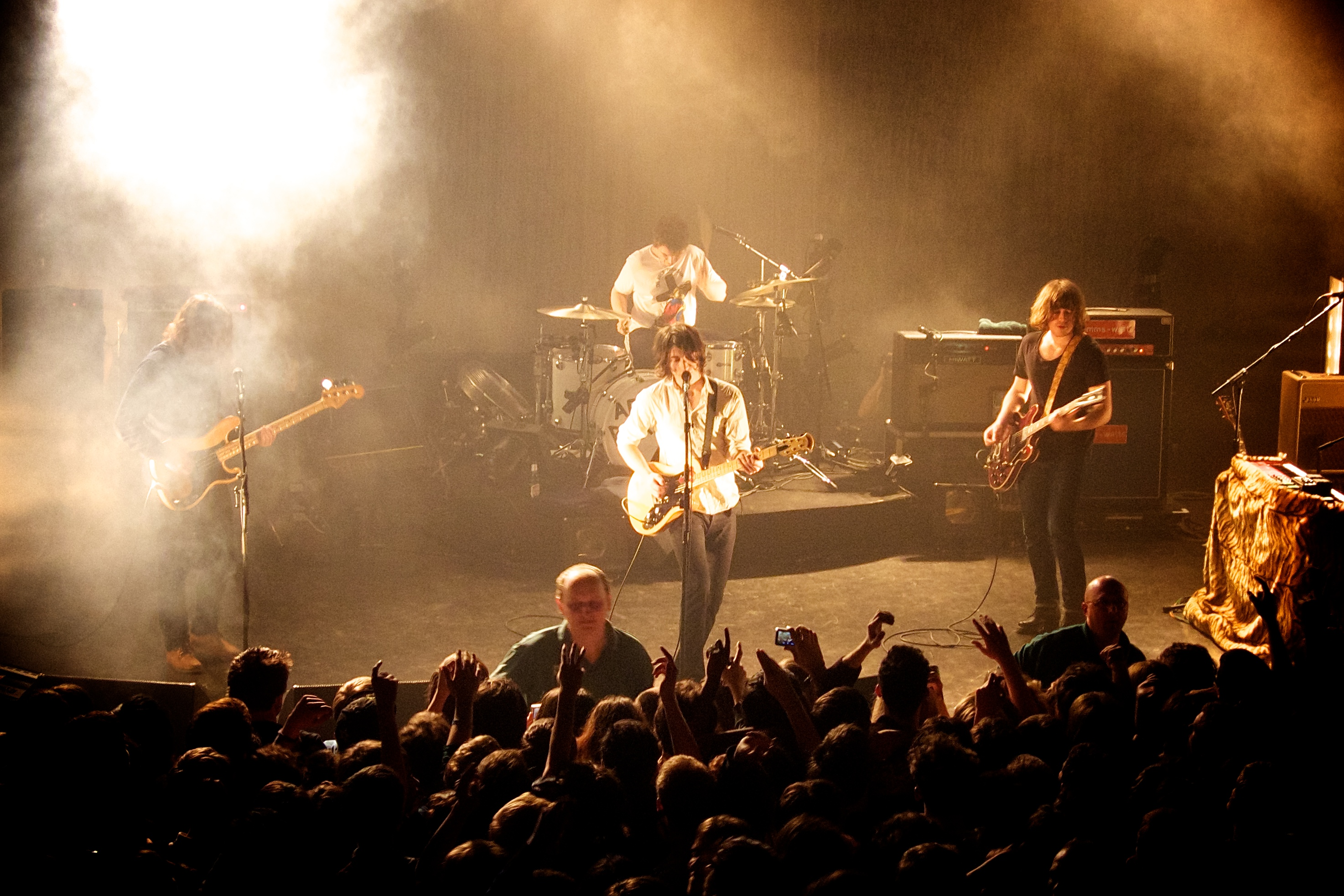
Arctic Monkeys at the Shepherd's Bush Empire, London, March 2010

After a brief hiatus during which Turner toured and recorded with his side project the Last Shadow Puppets, the band recorded half the album at Rancho De La Luna recording sessions with Josh Homme of Queens of the Stone Age in early autumn, 2008, and half in the New York sessions with James Ford in spring, 2009, following their January tour of New Zealand and Australia. During this tour, lead single "Crying Lightning", along with Humbug songs "Pretty Visitors", "Dangerous Animals" and "Potion Approaching" (then known as "Go-Kart"), was debuted live. It was later revealed by Matt Helders in a video diary that the album would consist of 14 tracks and that Turner would stay in New York to oversee the mixing of the material. However, the final track listing, revealed on 1 June 2009, listed only 10.

In a preview article on Clash, writer Simon Harper claimed that the band had "completely defied any expectations or presumptions to explore the depths they can reach when stepping foot outside their accepted styles," and that "Turner is his usual eloquent self, but has definitely graduated into an incomparable writer whose themes twist and turn through stories and allegories so potent and profound it actually leaves one breathless". On the same site, Turner revealed that the band had listened to Nick Cave, Jimi Hendrix and Cream while writing the new album, the title of which would be Humbug. Humbug was released on 19 August 2009, and, like both of its predecessors, the album went straight to No. 1.

As announced on Arctic Monkeys' website, the first single from Humbug was "Crying Lightning", released on 6 July. It also received its first radio premiere on the same day. On 12 July 2009, the single "Crying Lightning" debuted at number 12 in the UK singles chart. The second single, "Cornerstone", was released on 16 November 2009. It was announced in February 2010 that the third and final single to be taken from Humbug would be "My Propeller", released on 22 March. Shortly before the release of the new single, the band did a one-off UK show at the Royal Albert Hall in support of the Teenage Cancer Trust on 27 March.

Arctic Monkeys embarked on the first leg of the worldwide Humbug Tour in January 2009 and went on to headline 2009's Reading and Leeds Festivals. During this performance, they played a number of songs from Humbug, plus older tracks such as "Brianstorm" and a cover of Nick Cave and the Bad Seeds' "Red Right Hand". They were also the headline act on the first night of 2009's Exit festival in Serbia. In North America, where they had less of a following, they played abridged sets at Montreal's Osheaga Festival, as well as New Jersey's All Points West Music and Arts Festival. The tour finished in early 2010 in Mexico.

=== 2011–2012: Suck It and See ===
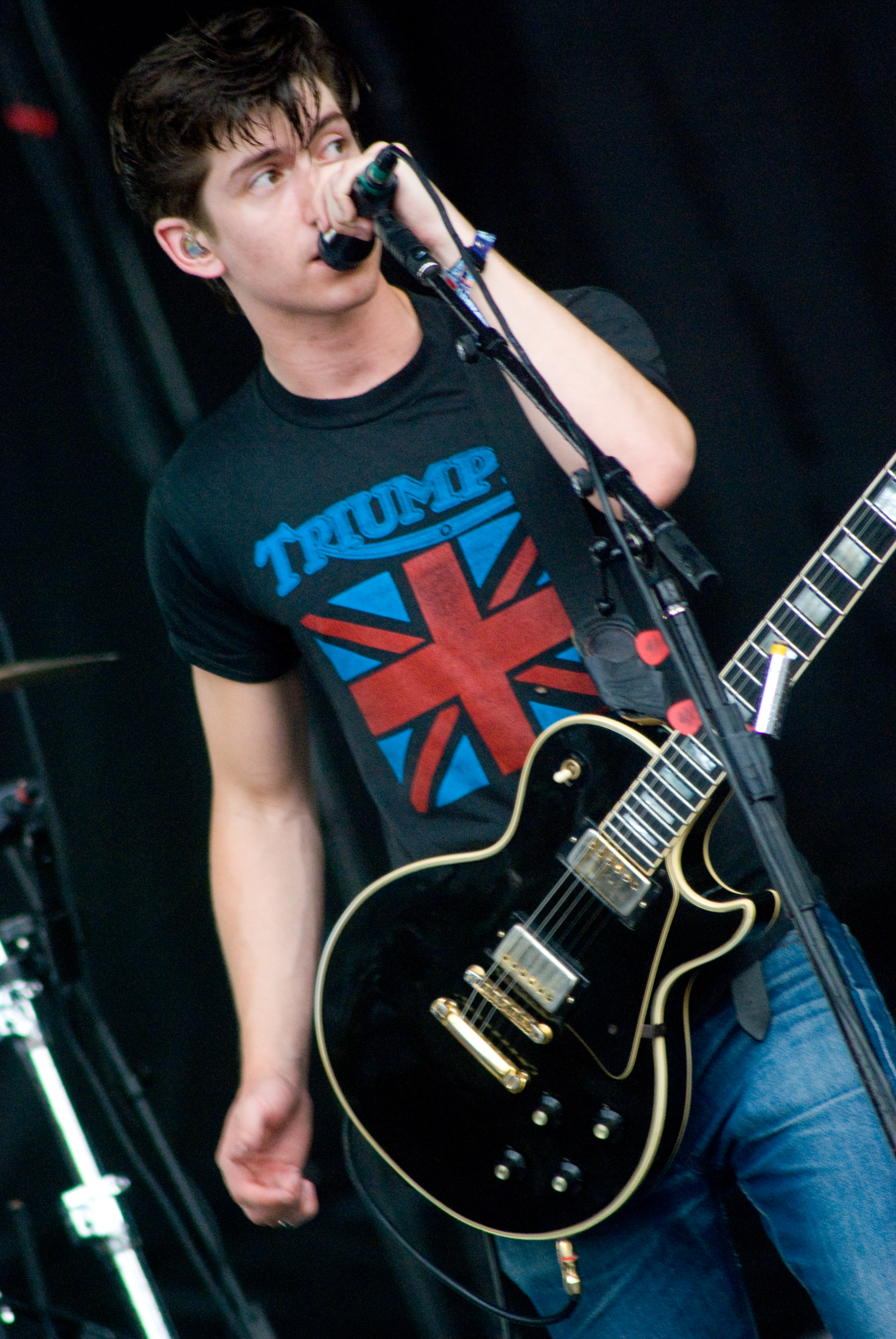
Lead vocalist Alex Turner at Lollapalooza in Chicago, August 2011

NME reported in May 2011 that the band were teaming up with producer James Ford once again and would be releasing their fourth studio album in late spring at the earliest. Q magazine reported that the fourth Arctic Monkeys album would be of a "more accessible vintage" than Humbug. Q printed edition 299 states "It's the sound of a band drawing back the curtains and letting the sunshine in". The album was recorded in Sound City Studios in Los Angeles in 2010 and 2011. On 4 March 2011, the band premièred on its website a new track called "Brick by Brick" with lead vocals by Matt Helders. Helders explained that this is not a single, just a tease of what is coming and that is it is going to be on the fourth album. On 10 March 2011 the band revealed the album to be called Suck It and See and was released on 6 June 2011.

Their fourth album's first single, titled "Don't Sit Down 'Cause I've Moved Your Chair" was released as a digital download on 12 April and on vinyl with "Brick by Brick" on 16 April for Record Store Day. On 17 April, it went to No. 28 in the UK singles chart. A version of the single with 2 B-sides was released on 7 and 10 inch vinyl on 30 May. The band allowed fans to listen to the entire album on their website before deciding about whether to purchase it or not. Suck It and See was then released on 6 June 2011, and went straight to No. 1 in the album charts. In doing so, Arctic Monkeys became only the second band in history to debut four albums in a row at the top of the charts.

The band announced "The Hellcat Spangled Shalalala" as the second single to be taken from Suck It and See. Most of the stock was burned because of the London riots. A limited edition 7" Vinyl of the single was then released over the band's website on 14 August. The song reached No. 15. in Belgium. In September 2011 the band released a music video for the song "Suck It and See" featuring drummer Matt Helders, and announced they would be releasing it as a single on 31 October 2011. In July 2011, the band released a live EP over iTunes with 6 live recordings from the iTunes Festival in London.

The album has also been successful commercially. In its first week of release, the album debuted at number one in the United Kingdom, selling over 82,000 units. Overall, the album sold 333,000 units. NME named the album cover, an artwork-free cream monochrome after the styling of the Beatles' White Album, as one of the worst in history. In July, the album won Mojo award for the Best Album of 2011. Mojo placed the album at number 39 on its list of "Top 50 albums of 2011". On 30 May, a week before official release, Domino Records streamed the entire album on SoundCloud. Within a few hours of being made public, the first two tracks had reached over 10,000 listens each, and by the end of the week, each had accrued over 100,000 plays.

Arctic Monkeys embarked in May 2011 on their Suck It and See Tour. They headlined the Benicàssim Festival 2011 alongside the Strokes, Arcade Fire and Primal Scream. They also headlined Oxegen 2011, Super Bock Super Rock 2011, V Festival 2011, Rock Werchter and T in The Park. They confirmed on 7 February that they were playing two "massive homecoming shows" at the Don Valley Bowl in Sheffield on 10 and 11 June, support included Miles Kane, Anna Calvi, the Vaccines and Dead Sons and Mabel Love, clips from the show were also used in the music video for "The Hellcat Spangled Shalalala". They played at Lollapalooza 5–7 August 2011. On 21 August, they also played at Lowlands, the Netherlands. The tour continued until March 2012.

On 27 October they released a music video for "Evil Twin" on YouTube, the B-side to their new single "Suck It and See". They performed the song on The Graham Norton Show on 28 October. The fourth single from Suck It and See, "Black Treacle" was released on 23 January 2012. This video for the single continued the theme from the previous single, "Suck It and See" and "Evil Twin". In March, the band embarked on a North American stadium tour supporting the Black Keys.

=== 2013–2016: AM ===
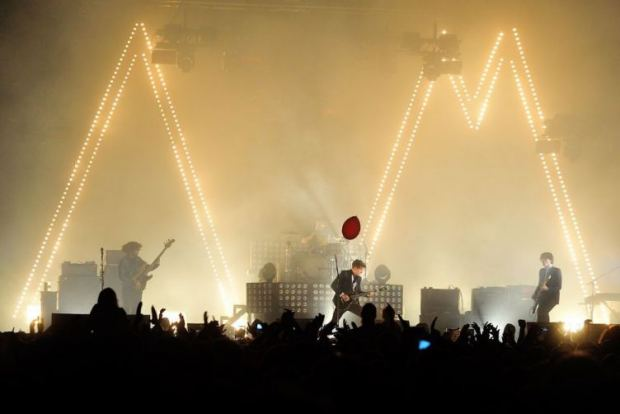
Arctic Monkeys performing at the InMusic Festival in Zagreb on 25 June 2013. The concert was a part of the AM Tour.

On 26 February 2012, the band released a new song titled "R U Mine?" on their YouTube channel. On 4 March, it went to No. 23 on the UK singles chart on downloads alone. On 21 April, the song was released as a single, with the track "Electricity" as a B-side, released additionally for Record Store Day. On 27 July, Arctic Monkeys played in the London Summer Olympics opening ceremony, performing "I Bet You Look Good on the Dancefloor" and a cover of the Beatles song "Come Together".

On 22 May 2013 the band started the AM Tour at the Ventura Theatre in Ventura, California, where they debuted a new song titled "Do I Wanna Know?". On 1 June 2013, the band performed at Free Press Summer Fest in Houston, TX. On 14 June, the band debuted another song titled "Mad Sounds" at Hultsfred Festival in Sweden. Four days later, on 18 June 2013, the band released the official video to "Do I Wanna Know?". The studio version of the song, along with accompanying visuals, was also made available to purchase via iTunes and entered the UK singles chart at number 11. On 23 June 2013 Arctic Monkeys headlined Southside Festival in Germany.

The band's fifth studio album, AM, was released on 9 September 2013. The album was recorded in Rancho de la Luna in Joshua Tree, California and features guest appearances from Josh Homme of Queens of the Stone Age, Elvis Costello's drummer Pete Thomas and Bill Ryder-Jones of the Coral. Further, on 27 June, the band announced an eight date UK arena tour culminating with a homecoming gig at the Motorpoint Arena Sheffield. The band played at the 2013 Glastonbury Festival on 28 June as headliners at the Pyramid stage. Arctic Monkeys also headlined the 2013 Open'er Festival in Gdynia, Poland and played on the main stage on 4 July. On 20 July, the band performed at Benicàssim 2013. On 11 August 2013, the third single from the album, "Why'd You Only Call Me When You're High?", was released, with the B-side "Stop The World I Wanna Get Off With You". It debuted at no. 8 on the UK singles chart on 18 August 2013, making it the band's first UK Top 10 single since 2007's "Fluorescent Adolescent". The band streamed the album in its entirety four days ahead of its release.

AM has received critical acclaim from music critics. At Metacritic, which assigns a normalised rating out of 100 to reviews from mainstream critics, the album received an average score of 81, based on 36 reviews. Simon Harper of Clash magazine states: "Welding inspiration from hip-hop greats with rock's titans, AM is built upon portentous beats that are dark and intimidating, yet wickedly thrilling." Ray Rahman of Entertainment Weekly gave it an 'A−' and opined that "AM mixes Velvet Underground melodies, Black Sabbath riffs, and playful grooves, and has fun doing it." Time Out said of the album: "One of Britain's greatest bands just got greater in an unexpected but hugely welcome way. Single men, I urge you: put down FHM and pick up AM." In their 10/10 review, NME wrote that AM is "absolutely and unarguably the greatest record of their career". In his 8/10 review, J.C. Maçek III of PopMatters praised Turner for being "at his most poetic to date" and called the album "a wonderfully cohesive and diverse album that fits together incredibly well". Tim Jonze of The Guardian noted that the album "manages to connect those different directions – the muscular riffs of Humbug and the wistful pop of Suck It and See – with the bristling energy and sense of fun that propelled their initial recordings". Pitchfork's Ryan Dombal called AM "paranoid and haunted".

Upon the release of AM on 9 September 2013, the album debuted at number 1 in the UK album charts, selling over 157,000 copies in its first week. As a result, Arctic Monkeys made history as the first independent label band with five consecutive number 1 albums in the UK. The album received widespread critical acclaim and brought Arctic Monkeys their third nomination for the Mercury Prize. The album also won the Brit award for Best British Album. In the United States, the album sold 42,000 copies in its first week and debuted at number six on the Billboard 200 chart, becoming the band's highest-charting album in the United States. In August 2017, AM was certified platinum by the RIAA for combined sales and album-equivalent units over of a million units in the United States. Turner described AM as the band's "most original [album] yet," merging hip-hop drum beats with 1970s heavy rock. The frontman has said that the song "Arabella" expresses the two styles of the album most effectively in one track. On AM, Turner continued to experiment with unusual lyrics, and the album includes the words from poem "I Wanna Be Yours" by John Cooper Clarke. Turner has stated that Homme's appearance on the song "Knee Socks" marks his favourite moment of the whole album.

On 23 and 24 May 2014, Arctic Monkeys held one of their biggest shows to date, playing to approximately 80,000 across two days shows at Finsbury Park with the support act by Tame Impala, Miles Kane and Royal Blood. Arctic Monkeys also headlined the Reading and Leeds Festival in August 2014. The band had a handful of shows in late 2014, which closed the AM Tour. In December 2014, "Do I Wanna Know?" was nominated for the Grammy Award for Best Rock Performance. On 24 August 2014, the band announced a hiatus following their AM Tour. Turner and Helders have both pursued other projects during this time. In 2016, Turner announced his second album with the Last Shadow Puppets, Everything You've Come to Expect. Helders played the drums on Iggy Pop's album Post Pop Depression. In July 2016, the band revealed an elephant sculpture designed in the style of their AM album cover for charity. The project raised money for the Sheffield Children's Hospital arts trail.

=== 2017–2021: Tranquility Base Hotel & Casino ===
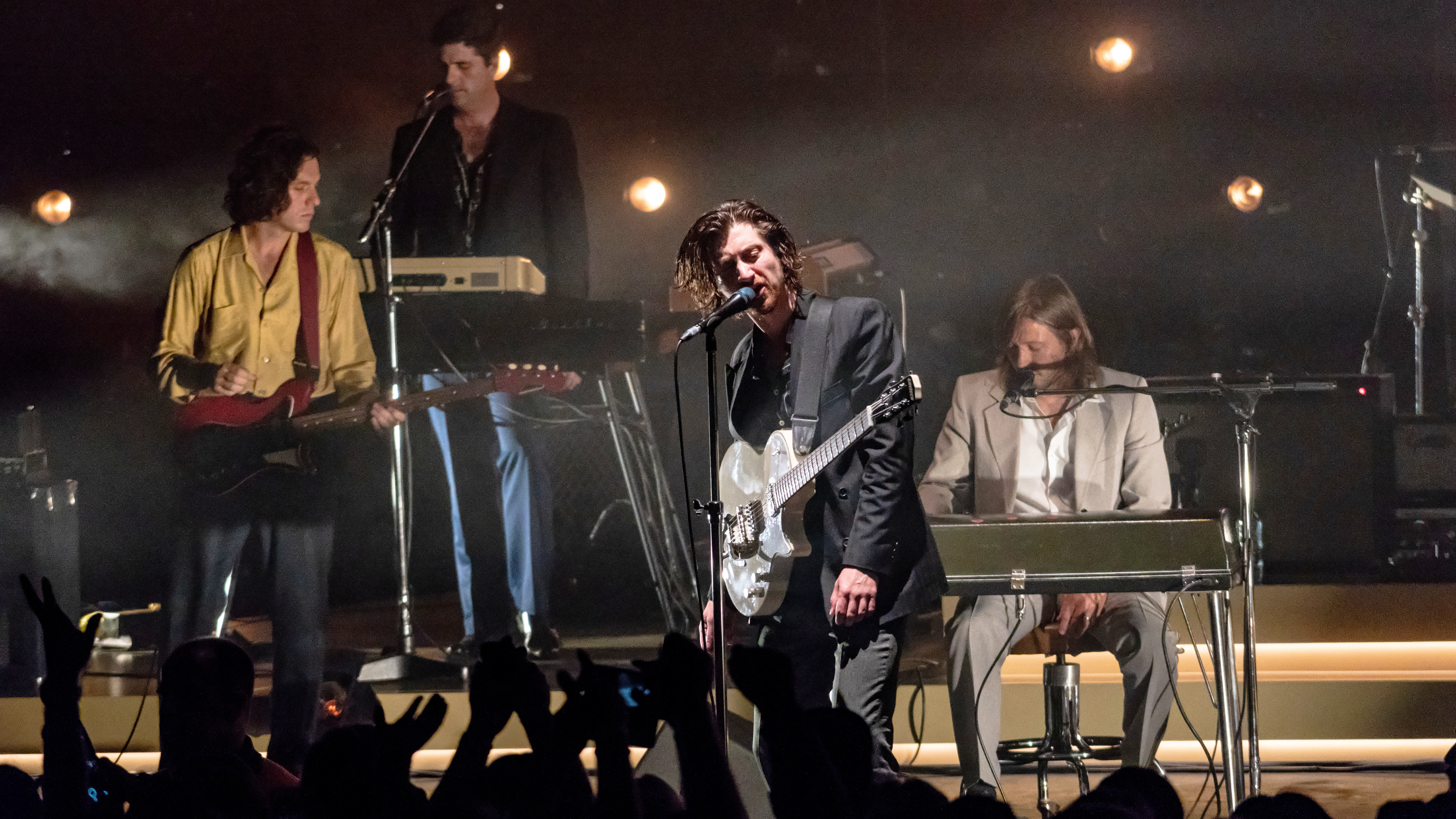
The band's 2018 performance at the Royal Albert Hall, which was later released as Live at the Royal Albert Hall in 2020

In December 2016, Turner confirmed to BBC Radio Sheffield that the band's hiatus had ended and work had begun on their sixth studio album. The album had begun recording in September 2017. The album, Tranquility Base Hotel & Casino was released on 11 May 2018. The band headlined a handful of festivals in summer 2018, included Firefly Music Festival, TRNSMT, Rock Werchter, Lollapalooza, Austin City Limits Music Festival, and the Voodoo Experience. Despite its stylistic deviation polarising listeners, Tranquility Base Hotel & Casino was released to generally positive reviews. It became the band's sixth consecutive number-one debut in the UK and the country's fastest-selling vinyl record in 25 years. Following its release, the album was promoted by the singles "Four Out of Five" and "Tranquility Base Hotel & Casino", along multiple television appearances.

Reflektor Magazine had the following to say about the album in a review, "After five years of silence, the Arctic Monkeys make their much-awaited return with surprising and hypnotic Tranquility Base Hotel & Casino. Perfectly managing to avoid self-parody or stylistic repetitions, this new album appears as a startling reinvention, a meandering and puzzling journey beyond known territories. Just like mankind first set foot on the moon on the 'Tranquility base' site, the Arctic Monkeys disembark in an unknown universe in which they reveal a new, unexpected aspect of themselves.".

Tranquility Base Hotel & Casino was nominated for the 2018 Mercury Prize, an annual prize awarded to the year's best British or Irish album. This became the band's fourth nomination for the award: the second most nominations received by any act. The album was nominated for Best Alternative Music Album at the 61st Annual Grammy Awards, with single "Four Out of Five" nominated for Best Rock Performance. The album also appeared on numerous year-end lists. With Q and Kitty Empire of The Observer naming it the best album of 2018. Publications including NME, The Independent and Mojo also listed Tranquility Base Hotel & Casino as the year's second best album. Uproxx, BBC Radio 6 Music and Entertainment Weekly included the album in the top five of their year-end lists, with Vulture and The Guardian including the album in their top ten. Publications that listed the album in their top twenty include Paste and The Line of Best Fit. Numerous publications included Tranquility Base Hotel & Casino in their top fifty albums of the year, including Crack Magazine, Esquire, musicOMH, Pitchfork, Uncut and Louder Than War, while Vice listed the album in their top hundred.

A live album from their 2018 Tranquility Base Hotel & Casino Tour concert at the Royal Albert Hall entitled Live at the Royal Albert Hall was released on 4 December 2020. All proceeds from the album, as with the concert, went to the charity War Child.

=== 2022–present: The Car ===
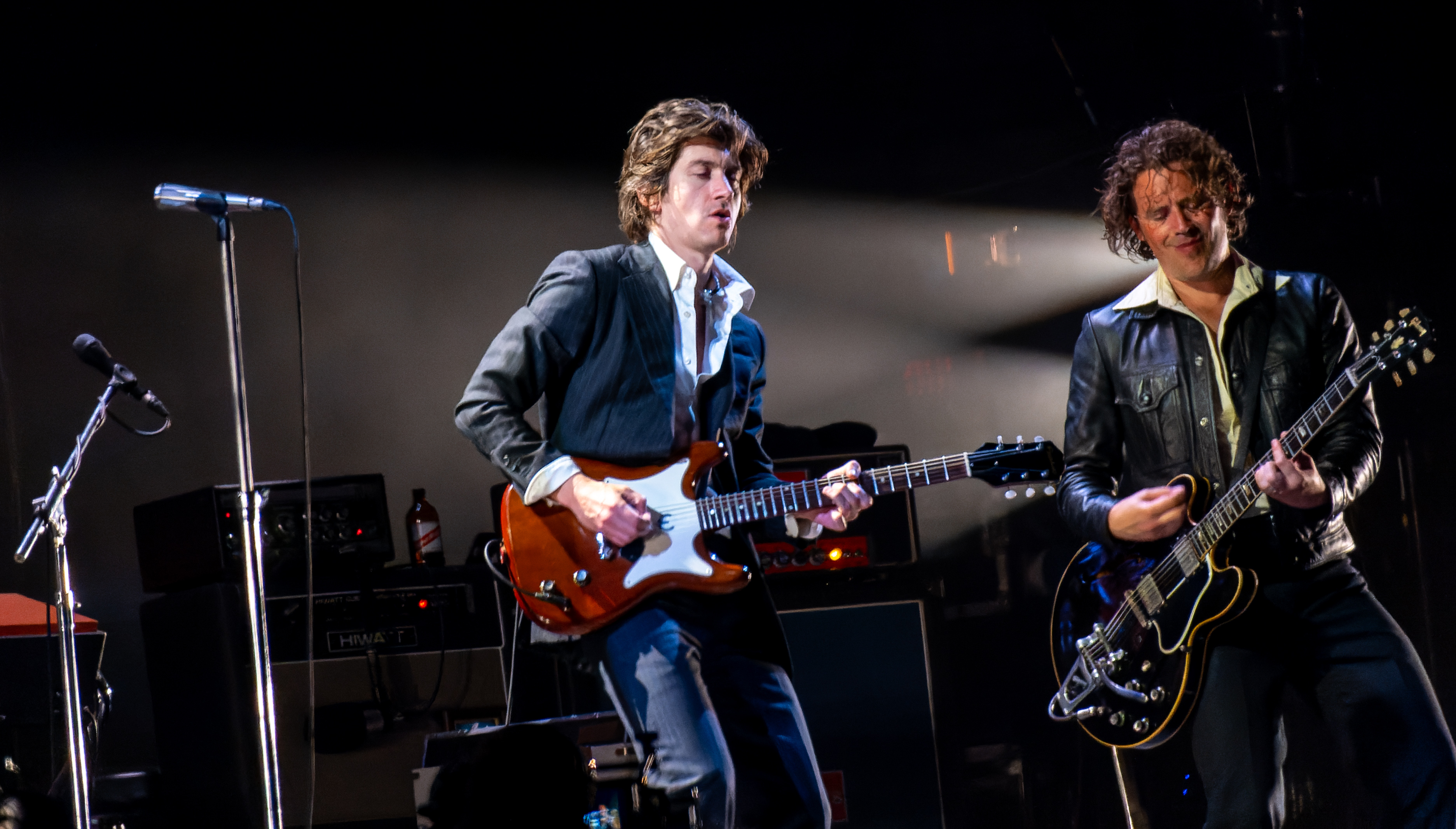
Turner on stage at Glastonbury Festival in England, June 2023

On 8 December 2021, the band was announced as the Saturday co-headliner of the 2022 Reading and Leeds Festival, alongside Bring Me the Horizon, Megan Thee Stallion, Rage Against the Machine and Halsey. On 23 August 2022 at the Zurich Openair festival, they debuted new song "I Ain't Quite Where I Think I Am". The following day they announced their seventh studio album, The Car, which was released on 21 October 2022. On 30 August 2022, they released the first single from the album, "There'd Better Be a Mirrorball", accompanied by a video directed by Turner. On 29 September 2022, the second single "Body Paint" was released. "I Ain't Quite Where I Think I Am" was released as the third single on 18 October 2022. The Car peaked at No. 2 on the UK Albums Chart, behind Taylor Swift's Midnights. In the US, the album landed at No. 6 on the Billboard 200. On 24 June 2023, the band headlined the Pyramid Stage at Glastonbury Festival, their third time headlining at the festival.

The Car, like its predecessor, was nominated for the 2023 Mercury Prize. This was their fifth nomination, the most nominations of any artist, held jointly with Radiohead. The album was also nominated for "Best Alternative Music Album" at the 66th Annual Grammy Awards, the songs "Body Paint" and "Sculptures of Anything Goes" were nominated in the Best Alternative Music Performance and Best Rock Performance categories respectively. The Car received praise from critics, being called the best album of the year by NME as well as being in the top five of several publications, including DIY, The Sunday Times and The Guardian.

On 20 January 2026, Arctic Monkeys announced they would be releasing a new single as part of an upcoming project with charity organisation War Child, later revealed to be the compilation album Help(2). The song "Opening Night" was released on 22 January.

== Musical style and influences ==
"I Bet You Look Good on the Dancefloor"
Sample from "I Bet You Look Good on the Dancefloor".

Arctic Monkeys' musical style has been mainly described as indie rock, garage rock, post-punk revival, psychedelic rock, alternative rock, lounge pop, post-Britpop, stoner rock, guitar pop, post-punk, punk rock, and hard rock. A key part of their sound, and one that translates across their whole discography, is Turner's intricate and often rapidly delivered lyrics, sung in a distinctive strong Sheffield accent that their music became famed for in their early years.

On the band's beginnings, Alex Turner stated during an interview with Radio X that "I just wanted to be one of the Strokes... The arrival of The Strokes changed what music I was listening to, what shoes I was wearing. I grew my hair out and borrowed my mum's blazer". The punk poet John Cooper Clarke was a formative influence on Turner; his poem "I Wanna Be Yours" was adapted into a track on the band's fifth album AM. Their first album, Whatever People Say I Am, That's What I'm Not, has been described as indie rock, garage rock revival, post-punk revival, punk rock, alternative rock, and post-Britpop. Favourite Worst Nightmare has been described as post-punk revival, indie rock, garage rock, alternative rock, psychedelic rock, and post-Britpop, with Turner's sharp lyrics the focal point. On the first album, Turner examined human behaviour in nightclubs and in the culture of the band's hometown, Sheffield. Turner describes "Dancing Shoes" as being about "people always looking to pull when they go out however much they mask it".

These themes continued on the following album Favourite Worst Nightmare with the band still progressing as musicians. Songs such as "Fluorescent Adolescent" and "Do Me a Favour" explored failed relationships, nostalgia and growing old, while musically the band took up a more up-tempo and aggressive sound.

Their third album Humbug marked a change in sound and was described as psychedelic rock, hard rock, stoner rock, alternative rock, post-punk revival, indie rock, garage rock, and desert rock, due to the influence of the album's producer and Queens of the Stone Age frontman, Josh Homme. For Humbug, the band actively sought a new sound. Homme was quoted saying, "They came to me: 'Will you take us to the weird and the strange?'" According to Brooklyn Vegan, "they were no longer pulling mostly from rowdy garage rock, but from tripped-out psychedelia, lumbering doom metal, hypnotic stoner rock, and darker songwriters like Nick Cave."

Their fourth album Suck It and See sees the band exploring styles, mixing them with newfound maturity. Turner said: "I think the new album is a balance between our first three. There's nothing about taxi ranks or anything like that, but there's a bit of the standpoint I had on those early songs and the sense of humour, but also there's a bit of the 'Humbug' stuff which is kind of off in the corners." The album was described as guitar pop, indie rock, indie pop, psychedelic pop, alternative rock, pop rock, garage rock, psychedelic rock and pop. Critics noted an influence from British rock bands from the 1960s, as well as the Smiths, and slower, love-themed ballads featured more heavily on the album than the fast-paced, rockier songs that typify the band's sound. Turner wrote much of the album in his apartment on an acoustic guitar, further influencing the ballad-style prevalent on the album.

In a 2012 interview with Pitchfork, Turner recalled that he and his friends were fans of Oasis, and that his mother "would always play the Eagles too, so I'm word-perfect on shitloads of Eagles tunes". He also listened to hip hop acts such as Outkast, Eminem, Wu-Tang Clan and Roots Manuva, amongst others. He cited John Lennon, Ray Davies, Nick Cave and Method Man as major influences lyrically. When speaking about Lennon in an interview with NME, Turner said; "I remember when I first started writing songs, and writing lyrics, I really wanted to be able to write an "I Am the Walrus" type song, and I found it very difficult. You listen to that and it sounds like it's all nonsense, but it's difficult to write that sort of thing and make it compelling. Lennon definitely had a knack for that".

According to the band, their fifth album AM has been described as psychedelic rock, blues rock, indie rock, and hard rock, with hip hop influences. As Turner stated in an interview with NME, it's "like a Dr. Dre beat, but we've given it an Ike Turner bowl-cut and sent it galloping across the desert on a Stratocaster". He also cited Outkast, Aaliyah and Black Sabbath as influences for the album on the song "Arabella".

Their sixth album Tranquility Base Hotel & Casino took on a different direction, substituting the guitar-heavy sound from their previous albums for a more complex, piano-based style of composition. The album was described as psychedelic pop, lounge pop, space pop, and glam rock. In a 2018 interview with BBC Radio 1, Turner explained that he wrote the songs for the album on a piano instead of the guitar as "the guitar had lost its ability to give me ideas. Every time I sat with a guitar I was suspicious of where it was gonna go. I had a pretty good idea of what I might be which is completely contrary to what I felt when I sat at the piano." Alex also stated that he received inspiration from three Jean-Pierre Melville films—Un flic, Le Cercle Rouge and Le Samouraï, as well as the film adaptation of Edgar Allan Poe's short stories named Spirits of the Dead.

With there being a great distinction between the rock sound of AM and slower sound of Tranquility Base Hotel & Casino, their seventh album The Car has been described a comfortable middle ground. The album covers many genres including, art rock, orchestral rock, lounge pop, baroque pop, and funk, as well as elements of jazz. In a 2022 interview with ABC, Turner states, "Every time I've sort of thought about attempting to go in a direction that you've been before, it sort of feels – quite quickly – sounds like a spoof or something. I think we've always just been following the same instincts we were in the beginning. That hasn't really changed."

== Legacy and influence ==
According to Vice, "in Britain at least, Arctic Monkeys have reached a point where they are too enormous, too beloved a force to truly fail" and are probably the UK's biggest, most culturally important band. Vice further states that they are "the band that your friends whose music taste can otherwise be described as "Match of the Day-wave" are desperate to see perform live; the band dads and little brothers have in common—simply because throughout their career, they have remained consistent, while their peers in both sound and age have failed to keep similar longevity." English poet John Cooper Clarke praised the band as "the nearest thing" to the Beatles, a sentiment also shared by former NME editor Conor McNicholas, who further called them "one of the most important British bands of all time". Radio X has also named Arctic Monkeys as one of the best bands of all time.

Following the success of Whatever People Say I Am, That's What I'm Not, some critics cited the Arctic Monkeys as revolutionising the way people find music as they built a fanbase on the basis of a few demos shared by fans through the internet. The album was highly praised by critics for its depiction of youth British culture and for resurging British indie music that had waned after the 1990s, with NME declaring the Arctic Monkeys "Our Generation's Most Important Band."

According to NME, the band's 2013 album AM "became the soundtrack for countless nights out, hook-ups and comedowns in every town and city of this country" by the end of the 2010s. Johnny Davis of Esquire wrote, "Every so often, a band emerges to define the times not just for a generation of music fans but for a whole era – the Clash, the Smiths, Oasis, the Strokes. Where Arctic Monkeys may be unique is that they have now managed that role twice [with both Whatever People Say I Am, That's What I'm Not and AM]" The co-founder of the band's label Domino Records, Laurence Bell, said "They're the toast of the playground again, every 13-year-old loves them. But so do grandads who were into Led Zeppelin. It's very rare for a band to come out of the traps so big [with Whatever People Say I Am, That's What I'm Not] and then have another massive moment [with AM]. It reminds me of The Who and The Stones, where they did some pop singles early on and then moved into an imperial phase." Other musicians have praised the band including Mick Jagger, Led Zeppelin guitarist Jimmy Page, Foo Fighters frontman Dave Grohl, Metallica drummer Lars Ulrich, and rapper RZA. Bob Dylan says he has made "special efforts" to see the band live, while David Bowie, said they were "a nice solid Brit band". Damon Albarn called them "the last great guitar band ... I don't really know if there's anything as good as that since."

The band was an object of discussion for cultural theorist Mark Fisher in regard to the concept of hauntology and what he described as "the lost futures" of modernity. In an interview with Crack Magazine Fisher said: "... something like the Arctic Monkeys, there is no relation to historicity. They're clearly a retro group, but the category of retro doesn't make any sense anymore because it's retro compared to what?" and "Arctic Monkeys airbrush cultural time out and appeal to this endless return and timelessness of rock." The band have influenced artists including Black Midi, Blossoms, Fontaines D.C., Wallows, the 1975, Halsey, Yungblud, Lewis Capaldi, Arlo Parks, Sam Fender, Bring Me the Horizon, Måneskin, Hozier, Slowthai, JID, and Earthgang.

== Band members ==
Current members

- Alex Turner – lead vocals, guitars (2002–present), keyboards (2006–2009, 2017–present)
- Matt Helders – drums, backing and occasional lead vocals (2002–present), keyboards (2017–present)
- Jamie Cook – guitars (2002–present), keyboards (2018–present), backing vocals (2002–2007)
- Nick O'Malley – bass guitar, backing vocals (2006–present; touring member 2006)

Former members

- Andy Nicholson – bass guitar, backing vocals (2002–2006; inactive 2006)

Current touring musicians

- Scott Gillies – guitars (2013–present), keyboards (2012–2014, 2022–present)
- Tom Rowley – guitars, keyboards, backing vocals (2013–present), percussion (2013–2019)
- Davey Latter – percussion (2014–present)
- Tyler Parkford – keyboards, backing vocals (2018–present)

Former touring musicians

- John Ashton – keyboards, backing vocals (2009–2011), guitar, percussion (2009–2010)
- Ben Partons – keyboards (2011–2012)

== Discography ==
Studio albums

- Whatever People Say I Am, That's What I'm Not (2006)
- Favourite Worst Nightmare (2007)
- Humbug (2009)
- Suck It and See (2011)
- AM (2013)
- Tranquility Base Hotel & Casino (2018)
- The Car (2022)

== Concert tours ==
- Whatever People Say I Am Tour (2005–2006)
- Favourite Worst Nightmare Tour (2007)
- Humbug Tour (2009–2010)
- Suck It and See Tour (2011–2012)
- AM Tour (2013–2014)
- Tranquility Base Hotel & Casino Tour (2018–2019)
- The Car Tour (2022–2023)
