= My Propeller =

Single by Arctic Monkeys

from the album Humbug
- Released: 22 March 2010
- Studio: Mission Sound (Brooklyn)
- Length: 3:28
- Label: Domino
- Composers: Jamie Cook; Matt Helders; Nick O'Malley; Alex Turner
- Lyricist: Alex Turner
- Producer: James Ford

Arctic Monkeys singles chronology
| "Cornerstone" (2009) | "My Propeller" (2010) | "Don't Sit Down 'Cause I've Moved Your Chair" (2011) |

Music video
- "My Propeller" on YouTube

"My Propeller" is a song by the English indie rock band Arctic Monkeys. It was released as the third single from the band's third studio album Humbug, as announced on 1 February 2010. Released on 22 March 2010, the single follows its two predecessors from Humbug, "Crying Lightning" and "Cornerstone", with the 10" vinyl being sold exclusively at Oxfam charity stores. Originally, Arctic Monkeys planned the third single to be "Pretty Visitors", but this was switched to "My Propeller". The video for the single was released on 18 March.

The 10" version of the single features three new B-sides, with the 7" bringing one new B-side. The song "Joining the Dots" was revealed during Alex Turner's visit to Little Noise Sessions.

== Reception ==
Professional ratings
Review scores
| Source | Rating |
|---|---|
| PopMatters | 6/10 |

== Track listing ==
All lyrics are written by Alex Turner; all music is composed by Arctic Monkeys

7"
| No. | Title | Length |
|---|---|---|
| 1. | "My Propeller" | 3:28 |
| 2. | "Joining the Dots" | 3:19 |

10", MP3 digital download
| No. | Title | Length |
|---|---|---|
| 1. | "My Propeller" | 3:28 |
| 2. | "Joining the Dots" | 3:19 |
| 3. | "The Afternoon's Hat" | 4:11 |
| 4. | "Don't Forget Whose Legs You're On" | 3:35 |

== Personnel ==
Personnel taken from Humbug liner notes.

Arctic Monkeys

- Alex Turner
- Jamie Cook
- Nick O'Malley
- Matt Helders

Additional musician

- John Ashton – keyboards, backing vocals

Technical

- James Ford – production
- Alain Johannes – engineering
- Rich Costey – mixing
- Howie Weinberg – mastering

== Charts ==
| Chart (2010) | Peak position |
|---|---|
| Canadian Singles Chart | 6 |
| UK Singles Chart | 90 |
| UK Indie Chart | 7 |

== Certifications ==
Certification for "My Propeller"
| Region | Certification | Certified units/sales |
|---|---|---|
| United Kingdom (BPI) | Silver | 200,000^{‡} |
^{‡} Sales+streaming figures based on certification alone.
