= Pretty Visitors =

Song by Arctic Monkeys

from the album Humbug
- Released: 19 August 2009
- Studio: Pink Duck (Burbank, California); Rancho De La Luna (Joshua Tree, California)
- Genre: Psychedelic rock; stoner rock; heavy metal
- Length: 3:40
- Label: Domino
- Composers: Jamie Cook; Matt Helders; Nick O'Malley; Alex Turner
- Lyricist: Alex Turner
- Producer: Josh Homme

"Pretty Visitors" is a song by British band Arctic Monkeys, featured as the ninth song off of their 2009 album Humbug. It is noted for its organ intro and rapid-fire drums, as well as its enigmatic and quick-spoken lyrics. It was debuted on the Australia and New Zealand legs of the Humbug tour, where lead singer Alex Turner would play a Vox Super Continental Organ; these keyboard duties were then handed down to touring musician John Ashton for the remainder of the tour. The song has become a fan favourite and is frequently played during live performances. The song was originally intended to be the third and final single released for the album, however it was switched out for "My Propeller" shortly before release.

== Personnel ==
Personnel taken from Humbug liner notes.

Arctic Monkeys

- Alex Turner
- Jamie Cook
- Nick O'Malley
- Matt Helders

Technical

- Joshua Homme – production
- Alain Johannes – engineering
- Justin Smith – engineering assistance
- Claudius Mittendorfer – additional engineering
- Rich Costey – mixing
- Howie Weinberg – mastering
