= Stadthalle Offenbach =

Multifunctional convention and event center in Offenbach am Main, Germany

Coordinates: 50°04′58″N 8°46′37″E

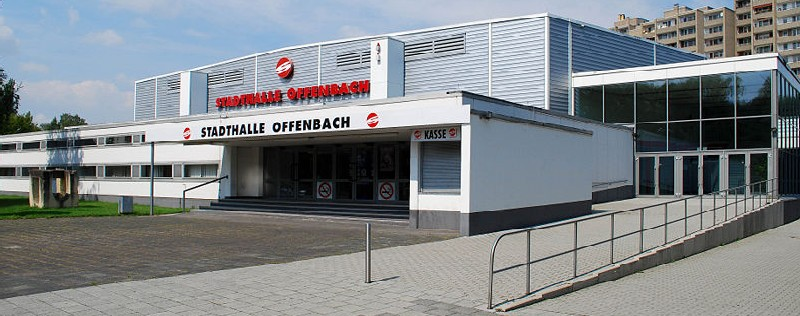
Stadthalle Offenbach

Stadthalle Offenbach is a convention center that opened in 1966 in Offenbach am Main, Germany. It hosts concerts, sporting events, cabaret and variety performances. There are 3,000 seats. Notable past performers include Frank Zappa, Bob Dylan, The Moody Blues, David Bowie, Erasure, Heart, Kiss, Iron Maiden, Pink Floyd, Rammstein, AC/DC, Metallica, Oasis, Taemin, Weather Report and Jimi Hendrix.
