= Cornerstone (song) =

Single by Arctic Monkeys

from the album Humbug
- B-side: "Catapult"; "Sketchead"; "Fright Lined Dining Room"
- Released: 16 November 2009
- Studio: Mission Sound (New York City)
- Genre: Soft rock; Britpop
- Length: 3:17
- Label: Domino
- Composers: Jamie Cook; Matt Helders; Nick O'Malley; Alex Turner
- Lyricist: Alex Turner
- Producer: James Ford

Arctic Monkeys singles chronology
"Crying Lightning" (2009)	"Cornerstone" (2009)	"My Propeller" (2010)

Music video
- "Cornerstone" on YouTube

"Cornerstone" is a song by the English rock band Arctic Monkeys from their third album Humbug (2009). Written by frontman Alex Turner, originally in the key of A major, the song is one of three tracks from the album that were produced by James Ford. Recording took place at Mission Sound in New York City.

Released by Domino Recording Company on 16 November 2009 as the album's second single "Cornerstone" was issued as a 7 inch alongside B-side "Catapult". Like the previous single "Crying Lightning", it was also released as an EP, with two more b-sides, "Sketchhead" and "Fright Lined Dining Room"; the vinyl was made available in Oxfam shops. The single received positive reviews from critics, and has since been considered as one of the band's best songs. Commercially, the single charted at number 94 in the UK charts and charted at number seven on the UK indie charts. It also debuted at number seven on the SoundScan singles charts for sales in Canada.

The music video was directed by Richard Ayoade who had previously done the one for "Crying Lightning". The clip features Turner standing in front of a white background, dressed in a red sweater while wearing a tape recorder, while singing and acting out the lyrics. In October 2013, the song was sampled by the rapper Dom Kennedy for the song "Pleeze" on his album Get Home Safely.

== Background and synopsis ==
Turner mentioned having different approaches to lyric writing, with one based "on an idea for a tune, like a story or a format" and the other focusing on "the sound of something phonetically". For "Cornerstone" he followed the former, as he knew he wanted "each verse to be the same format and then you sort of know exactly where it is going, and the humor can get in there", likening it to Jake Thackray's "Lah di Dah" (1967) Alex Turner told Uncut magazine that he wrote this song, "one morning, quite quickly." He added: "There's something to be said for writing in the morning. At other points in the day you're a bit more defensive. I saw it as a challenge to write something in a major key, but that wasn't cheesy." "Cornerstone" is performed in the key of A major.

The track is about a man who goes around to different pubs and bars in hopes of finding his ex-girlfriend. He is, however, only able to find look-alikes in each location. He approaches them anyway and is rejected by them in turn when he asks them if he can call them her name.

In each verse, the lyrics reference different made-up pubs (the Battleship, the Rusty Hook, the Parrot's Beak), with the last verse taking place in "the Cornerstone". It is here that he comes across his ex's sister, who finishes the song by saying "you can call me anything you want".

Some have speculated that "the Cornerstone" is a reference to a counselling centre in Sheffield, the home town of Arctic Monkeys.

== Music video ==
The music video for the single debuted on Channel 4 in the UK on 15 October 2009.

The music video, directed by Richard Ayoade, who worked on the videos of "Fluorescent Adolescent", "Crying Lightning" and their At the Apollo DVD, shows frontman Alex Turner singing the song alone in a white room holding a cassette recorder and microphone during the whole video. The other members of the band (Jamie Cook, Matt Helders and Nick O'Malley) are not present in the video.

== Reception ==
Professional ratings
Review scores
Source	Rating
Pitchfork	8/10

"Cornerstone" is widely considered to be one of the band's best songs. In 2023, Rolling Stone and Paste ranked the song number two and number one, respectively, on their lists of the greatest Arctic Monkeys songs. Marc Hogan of Pitchfork described the track as "an impeccable case for songcraft and subtlety" and likened its "backing's organ-swaying nostalgia" to Richard Hawley's Coles Corner (2005). For The Guardian Shaad D'Souza wrote, "there are few finer breakup songs – Turner perfectly captures breakup feelings that are otherwise rarely immortalised in art: recklessness, self-pity, mild psychosis. It zeroes in on self-absorption to an almost uncomfortable degree". Pitchfork included the song in their Top 100 Tracks of 2009 list.

== Track listing ==
All lyrics are written by Alex Turner; all music is composed by Arctic Monkeys.

7" (RUG349)
No.	Title	Length
1.	"Cornerstone"	3:20
2.	"Catapult"	3:28

10" (RUG349T), MP3 digital download
No.	Title	Length
1.	"Cornerstone"	3:20
2.	"Catapult"	3:28
3.	"Sketchead"	2:02
4.	"Fright Lined Dining Room"	3:26

== Personnel ==
Personnel taken from Humbug liner notes.

Arctic Monkeys

- Alex Turner
- Jamie Cook
- Nick O'Malley
- Matt Helders

Additional musician

- John Ashton – keyboards

Technical

- James Ford – production
- Alain Johannes – engineering
- Rich Costey – mixing
- Howie Weinberg – mastering

== Charts ==
Being released as an EP in Oxfam shops, the single charted at number 94 in the UK charts and charted at number seven on the UK indie charts. It also debuted at number seven on the SoundScan singles charts for sales in Canada. One of the single's B-sides, "Sketchead", peaked at number 80 on the UK Singles Chart, fourteen places higher than "Cornerstone"'s peak position.

Chart (2009)	Peak position
Belgium Singles Chart (Flanders)	68
Canadian Singles Chart	7
French Singles Chart	42
UK Singles Chart	94
UK Indie Chart	7

== Certifications ==
Region	Certification	Certified units/sales
United Kingdom (BPI)	Gold	400,000^{‡}
^{‡} Sales+streaming figures based on certification alone.
