= Crying Lightning =

2009 single by Arctic Monkeys

Single by Arctic Monkeys

from the album Humbug
- B-side: "Red Right Hand"; "I Haven't Got My Strange"
- Released: 6 July 2009
- Studio: Pink Duck (Burbank, California); Rancho De La Luna (Joshua Tree, California)
- Genre: Psychedelic rock; stoner rock
- Length: 3:43
- Label: Domino
- Composers: Jamie Cook; Matt Helders; Nick O'Malley; Alex Turner
- Lyricist: Alex Turner
- Producer: Josh Homme

Arctic Monkeys singles chronology
"Teddy Picker" (2007)	"Crying Lightning" (2009)	"Cornerstone" (2009)

Music video
- "Crying Lightning" on YouTube

"Crying Lightning" is a song by the English indie rock band Arctic Monkeys, released as the first single from their third album Humbug. It was first played on Zane Lowe's show on BBC Radio 1 on 6 July 2009 and was then made available on iTunes to download the same day. Physical copies of the single were made available on 17 August, one week before the release of the album. The vinyl was made available in Oxfam shops and sold with a download code for fans to get a free MP3 version of the song.

The single debuted at number 12 on the UK Singles Chart on 12 July 2009 by downloads alone.

== Music video ==
The music video for the single debuted on Channel 4 in UK on 24 July 2009.

The music video, directed by Richard Ayoade (who worked with the band previously on the video for "Fluorescent Adolescent", as well as their At the Apollo live DVD), shows the band performing the song on a boat on a rough sea. During a short instrumental interlude, a large figure rises up from the sea in the form of frontman, Turner. He falls to his knees where the boat passes between his legs before the other three band members (Cook, Helders and O'Malley) also rise up out from the water.

== Critical reception ==
Professional ratings
Review scores
Source	Rating
BBC	5/5 stars
DIY	4/5 stars
Pitchfork	7/10
Pretty Much Amazing	6/10

For the BBC Fraser McAlpine was very complimentary and described the sound of Crying Lightning as "a band who were always older than their years, and greater than the sum of their parts, becoming more mature and getting better into the bargain". Ryan Dombal of Pitchfork praised the change in sound from the band's earlier output saying it "excellently turns the Arctics' oftentimes-too-antic blitzkrieg pop into something a tad slower and heavier and more fucked". For Pretty Much Amazing Luis Tovar had similar thoughts "What I see now is a more controlled, matured, hardened band"; nevertheless, he was disappointed by the track on first listen. Lee White of DIY singled out producers Josh Homme and James Ford for managing "to bring out the full rock potential" of the band and thought the song served as a test for "Picking out the true admirers of the bands musical talent and songsmithery from those who simply rode the coat-tails of success to listen to songs about girls and dancefloors".

== Track listing ==
10", MP3 digital download
No.	Title	Lyrics	Music	Length
1.	"Crying Lightning"	Alex Turner	Arctic Monkeys	3:43
2.	"Red Right Hand"	Nick Cave	Nick Cave; Mick Harvey; Conway Savage; Thomas Wydler	4:19
3.	"I Haven't Got My Strange"	Alex Turner	Arctic Monkeys	1:29

7"
No.	Title	Lyrics	Music	Length
1.	"Crying Lightning"	Alex Turner	Arctic Monkeys	3:43
2.	"Red Right Hand"	Nick Cave	Nick Cave; Mick Harvey; Conway Savage; Thomas Wydler	4:19

== Personnel ==
Personnel taken from Humbug liner notes.

Arctic Monkeys

- Alex Turner
- Jamie Cook
- Nick O'Malley
- Matt Helders

Additional musician

- John Ashton – keyboards, backing vocals

Technical

- Joshua Homme – production
- Alain Johannes – engineering
- Justin Smith – engineering assistance
- Claudius Mittendorfer – additional engineering
- Rich Costey – mixing
- Howie Weinberg – mastering

== Charts ==
Chart (2009)	Peak position
Austrian Singles Chart	70
Belgium Singles Chart (Flanders)	63
Belgium Singles Chart (Wallonia)	49
Canadian Singles Chart	15
French Singles Chart	23
Japan Hot 100 (Billboard)	44
Switzerland Airplay (Swiss Hitparade)	86
UK Indie Chart	1
UK Singles Chart	12

== Certifications ==
Region	Certification	Certified units/sales
Canada (Music Canada)	Gold	40,000^{‡}
New Zealand (RMNZ)	Gold	15,000^{‡}
United Kingdom (BPI)	Platinum	600,000^{‡}
United States (RIAA)	Gold	500,000^{‡}
^{‡} Sales+streaming figures based on certification alone.
