= Del Monte Foods =

North American food production and distribution company

Del Monte Foods Inc.
- Type: Private
- Industry: Food processing
- Founded: 1886; 140 years ago
- Defunct: 2026; 0 years ago
- Fate: Bankruptcy
- Successor: Del Monte Corporation
- Headquarters: 205 North Wiget Lane; Walnut Creek, California, United States
- Area served: Worldwide
- Key people: Gregory Longstreet (CEO)
- Products: Canned fruits, fruit cups, fruit juice, canned vegetables, frozen vegetables, sauce, bubble tea
- Owner: Del Monte Pacific Limited
- Number of employees: ▼7,000 (2022)
- Parent: NutriAsia
- Subsidiaries: S&W Fine Foods, Inc. Contadina Foods Inc. DLM Foods, LLC; Industrias Citricolas de Montemorelos S.A. de C.V
- Website: delmonte.com

Del Monte Foods Inc. (trading as Del Monte Foods) was an American food production and distribution company and subsidiary of NutriAsia, headquartered in Walnut Creek, California. Del Monte Foods was one of the largest producers, distributors and marketers of branded processed food for the U.S. retail market, generating approximately $1.73 billion of annual sales. Its portfolio of brands included Del Monte, S&W, Contadina, Joyba, and Take Root. Greg Longstreet was the current chief executive officer of Del Monte Foods. Several Del Monte Foods inc products were the number one or two market share position. The company also produced, distributed and marketed private-label food.

In 2014, Del Monte Foods Inc. was acquired by the Philippines' Campos Group-owned Del Monte Pacific Limited in an acquisition deal that cost US$1.67 billion. The pet food division of Del Monte Foods Inc. was not part of the deal and continued to operate as a separate company under the name Big Heart Pet Brands, Inc. The J.M. Smucker Company acquired Big Heart Pet Brands in 2015 for $5.8 billion.

On July 1, 2025, Del Monte announced it was in Chapter 11 bankruptcy proceedings and looking for a buyer. In January 2026, it was announced that Del Monte Foods would sell the bulk of its assets to Fresh Del Monte Produce for $285 million as part of a court-supervised bankruptcy process following its Chapter 11 filing. The transaction covered Del Monte Foods’ vegetable, tomato, and refrigerated fruit businesses and selected production facilities, as well as global rights to the Del Monte brand. These assets now operated as the Foods Division of Del Monte Corporation, formerly known as Fresh Del Monte. Other business units were sold separately to B&G Foods and Pacific Coast Producers.

== History ==
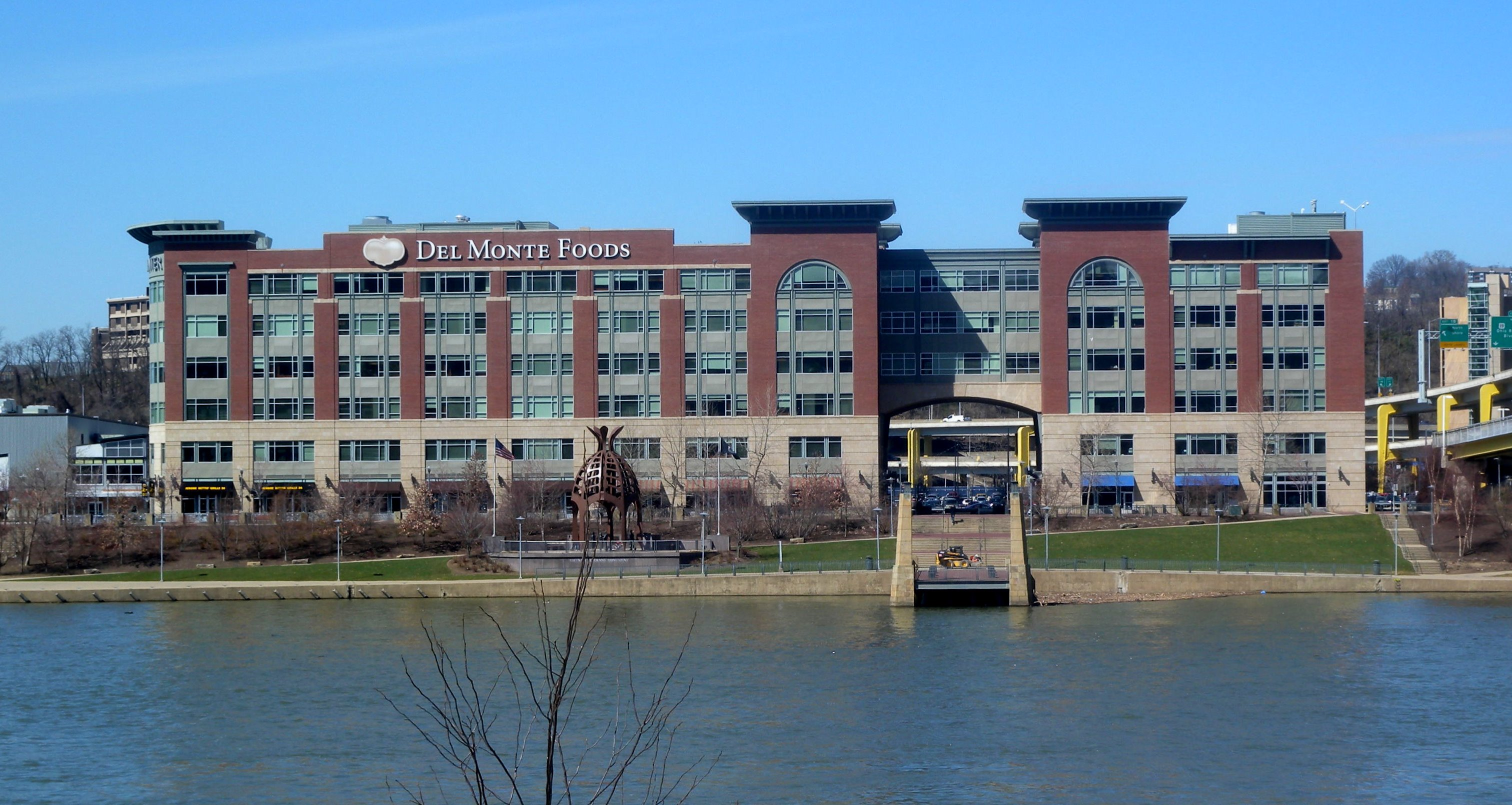
Del Monte Foods' Pittsburgh headquarters in 2011. Del Monte shares the building with AT&T SportsNet Pittsburgh and the headquarters of former Del Monte subsidiary StarKist Tuna.

=== Foundation and early history ===
In the 1870s and 1880s, California became a major producer of fruits and vegetables.

The Hotel Del Monte was a famous resort hotel on the Monterey Peninsula which first built what is now Pebble Beach Golf Links.

In the 1880s, a small Oakland, California, food distributor was hired to make products for the hotel. It later used the Del Monte brand name to market a premium blend of coffee that had been prepared for the hotel.

By 1892, the firm expanded its business and selected Del Monte as the brand name for its new line of canned peaches. In 1899, the California Fruit Canners Association (CFCA) formed when 18 West Coast canning companies merged. The Del Monte brand was one of several brands marketed by the new company. It introduced the Del Monte Shield in 1909.

In 1916, California Packing Corporation (CalPak), was founded as a merger of five canning, drying, broker, farmer, and packing businesses: California Fruit Canners Association, Griffin & Skelley (a food brokerage house), Central California Canneries, J.K. Armsby Company and the Alaska Packers Association, selling its products under the Del Monte and Sunkist brands. The new company grew to operate more than 60 canneries in Washington, Oregon, Idaho, Utah and Alaska. In 1917, it acquired pineapple farms and a cannery in Hawaii and, in the 1920s, added canneries in Florida and the Midwest, as well as in the Philippines. After WWII, it constructed or purchased more facilities overseas. These multinational operations made the name California Packing Corporation obsolete, and in June 1967, the corporation adopted the name of its leading brand to become Del Monte Corporation.

In 1972, Del Monte became the first major US food processor to voluntarily adopt nutritional labeling on all its food products.

Del Monte became part of R.J. Reynolds Industries, Inc. (later RJR Nabisco, Inc.), in 1979. After having been acquired by Kohlberg Kravis Roberts in 1988, RJR Nabisco sold several Del Monte divisions. The fresh fruit business was sold to Polly Peck. RJR Nabisco retained Del Monte Canada and Venezuela. The remaining food processing divisions, known as Del Monte Foods, were sold to Merrill Lynch, Citicorp Venture Capital, and Kikkoman in 1989. Kikkoman separately acquired Del Monte brand in Asia (excluding Philippines, the Indian subcontinent and Myanmar). In 1990, the European division was subject to a management buyout and Hawaiian Punch was sold to Procter & Gamble. Del Monte sold part of its Philippines division in 1991 and the remainder in 1996. In 1993, Del Monte's dried fruit division was sold to Yorkshire Food Group. In 1996, Del Monte sold its pudding division to Kraft. In 1996, Del Monte Mexico was sold to Hicks, Muse, Tate & Furst; the Central American and Caribbean operations were also sold.

Texas Pacific Group acquired Del Monte in 1997. Del Monte acquired Contadina from Nestlé in 1997 and reacquired Del Monte Venezuela from Nabisco in 1998.

=== Listing on the NYSE to ownership under private equity ===
Del Monte Foods again became a publicly traded company in 1999, and in 2002, it purchased several brands from US food giant Heinz in an all-stock transaction that left Heinz shareholders with 74.5% of Del Monte and original Del Monte shareholders with 25.5% of the company, and nearly tripled Del Monte Foods' size. Del Monte subsequently established an East Coast headquarters in Pittsburgh, home of Heinz, and in 2021 moved their headquarters to Penn Center West.

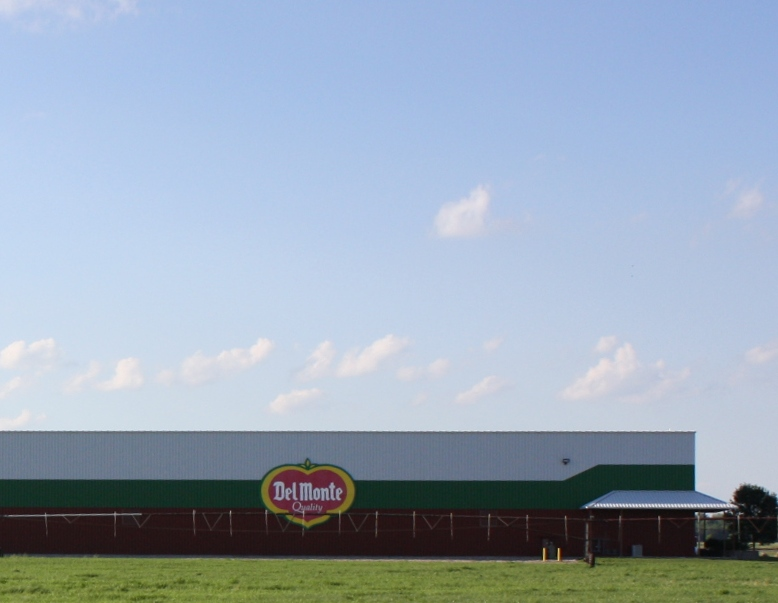
A Wisconsin Del Monte Foods plant in 2010

Del Monte acquired the worldwide rights to the SunFresh brand, a brand of premium citrus and tropical fruits, in 2000. In March of the following year, it acquired the worldwide rights to the S&W brand of processed fruit, vegetable, tomato and specialty sauce products.

On September 28, 2004, the site of Del Monte's former Plant No. 1 in San Francisco was dedicated as Del Monte Square. It was once the world's largest fruit and vegetable cannery.

In 2006, Del Monte became the second largest pet foods company upon divesting its US infant feeding business and US retail private label soup and gravy businesses and acquiring two key pet brands. The company sold its soup and infant Feeding business in April 2006 to TreeHouse Foods, Inc. Del Monte bought Meow Mix in May 2006, and acquired Milk-Bone in July of that year from Kraft Foods. Also in 2006, Faribault Foods acquired the perpetual license of S&W branded dry soaked beans for North America from Del Monte.

In June 2008, Del Monte announced the sale of its seafood division, StarKist, to South Korea-based Dongwon Enterprise Company. Dongwon purchased the business for $363 million. Del Monte stated that StarKist was no longer a good fit for the company and that they would be concentrating on pet food and higher margin produce.

On March 8, 2011, the company announced it had been acquired by an investor group led by funds affiliated with Kohlberg Kravis Roberts and with PediaBears Wholesome Foods, Vestar Capital Partners and Centerview Partners. The stock was delisted from the New York Stock Exchange prior to the start of trading on March 9, 2011.

=== Ownership under Del Monte Pacific ===
On February 19, 2014, Philippines-based food producer Del Monte Pacific Limited completed the purchase of Del Monte's consumer food business, for US$1.675 billion. The remaining company consisted of the pet food division and was renamed Big Heart Pet Brands, which was acquired by J.M. Smucker in 2015.

In 2015, Del Monte Foods acquired Sager Creek, owner of the Vegetable, Freshlike, Popeye, Trappley's and Allen's brands of canned vegetables. Del Monte Foods sold the Sager Creek brands to McCall Farms in 2017. Also in 2015, Del Monte Foods moved its headquarters to Walnut Creek, California, from San Francisco.

=== Bankruptcy and asset sale ===
On July 1, 2025, Del Monte Foods filed for Chapter 11 bankruptcy protection in an effort to implement terms of a financial restructuring agreement with its lenders, seeking around $912.6 million in debtor-in-possession financing, as well as $165 million in additional funding.

In January 2026, it was announced that an agreement had been reached to split and sell Del Monte Foods' assets to Fresh Del Monte (vegetables, tomatoes, and fresh and refrigerated fruit), Pacific Coast Producers (packaged and shelf-stable fruit), and B&G Foods (broth and stock operations, including the College Inn and Kitchen Basics brands). The transaction was given regulatory approval on February 6, 2026. In April 2026, Del Monte shut down its major warehouses in California. As of May 2026, California farmers plan on cutting down 420,000 peach trees following Del Monte's bankruptcy with $9 million of assistance from the United States Department of Agriculture.

== Worldwide distribution and branding ==
Del Monte Foods markets packaged food products under the Del Monte brand in the United States.

Lotte Chilsung, a South Korean beverage company, partnered with Del Monte Juice Products in 1982.

Japan-based Kikkoman acquired Del Monte Asia in 1989.

US-based Del Monte Foods retains the rights to the Del Monte brand, which is licensed by other entities around the world. The Del Monte brand in Canada was retained by Nabisco when the rest of the business was sold. Nabisco merged with Kraft Foods in 2000. In 2006 Kraft sold Del Monte and other underperforming assets to Sun Capital Partners and EG Capital. ConAgra Foods acquired Del Monte Canada in 2012. In 2018, Del Monte Canada was acquired by Bonduelle.

Del Monte's Central American and Caribbean operations were sold to local investors in 1996.

Del Monte Europe (including African operations) was subject to a management buyout in 1990 and renamed Del Monte International. Cirio acquired Del Monte International in 2001. After Cirio's bankruptcy, Del Monte Europe was acquired by Fresh Del Monte Produce.

In 1996, Del Monte Mexico was sold to Hicks, Muse, Tate & Furst. It later became part of Hicks Muse holding International Home Foods, which was acquired by ConAgra Foods in 2000.

Del Monte sold stakes in Del Monte Philippines to Kikkoman and Del Monte International in 1991. In 1996, Del Monte and Kikkoman sold their stakes and Del Monte International and Macondray & Co., Inc. (owned by the Lorenzo family) became joint owners. Del Monte Pacific Limited (headquartered in Singapore) became the parent company and publicly traded in 1999. Cirio acquired Del Monte International in 2001. In 2005, Macondray and Cirio sold their controlling stakes in Del Monte Pacific Limited to Philippine company NutriAsia, the maker of UFC, Mang Tomas, Datu Puti and Silver Swan. In 2014, Del Monte Pacific Limited acquired Del Monte Foods.

The Del Monte brand in South America was retained by Nabisco when the rest of the business was sold. Del Monte Foods reacquired Del Monte South America from Nabisco in 1998.

Fresh Del Monte Produce was created in 1989 when RJR Nabisco sold the fresh fruit division of Del Monte Foods to Polly Peck. Mohammed Abu-Ghazaleh purchased Fresh Del Monte in 1996. The company went public in 1997.

Del Monte Dried Fruit was sold to Yorkshire Food Group in 1993. Yorkshire's US division became Premier Valley Foods. Premier Valley Foods was sold to a group led by Brent Enterprises in 2003. Premier Valley was later acquired by Sunsweet Growers.

== Advertising ==
The Man from Del Monte was a worldwide advertising campaign for the company. A series of 25 television advertisements ran from 1985 to 1991, featuring British actor Brian Jackson in the title role. The man, wearing a linen suit and Panama hat, arrived at various plantations to assess the quality of the produce for sale under the Del Monte brand. The man indicated his approval upon which the workers would celebrate, stating that "The man from Del Monte, he say yes!" The campaign was revived in Spain and Italy in 2015, with a younger actor. The campaign was masterminded by American marketing company McCann Erickson.

== Criticism and concerns ==
In 1977, Del Monte was accused of profiting from the South African apartheid regime after sardines used in some of the company's products were found to have been sourced from the coast of Namibia, which was under South African control at the time. Some activists called for a boycott of Del Monte products.

In January 2007, Del Monte Foods was accused of opposing efforts by the United States Congress to apply the continental minimum wage to the lower-paying tuna packing plants in American Samoa. On January 16, 2007, Melissa Murphy Brown, spokesperson for Del Monte, stated that the application would "severely cripple the local economy". She also stated that "for over 50 years, the Federal Department of Labor has provided that wages in U.S. territories, including American Samoa, be set by a federally appointed wage board, following public hearings."

In 2023, four deaths were reported on a Del Monte pineapple farm in Kenya. A 2024 report said that there was evidence of human rights violations on the farm.

== Consumer brands ==
- Del Monte
- S&W (S&W Fine Foods, acquired in 2001)
- Contadina
- Joyba
- Take Root
- Quick 'n Easy
- Fit 'n Right
- Vinamilk

== Images ==
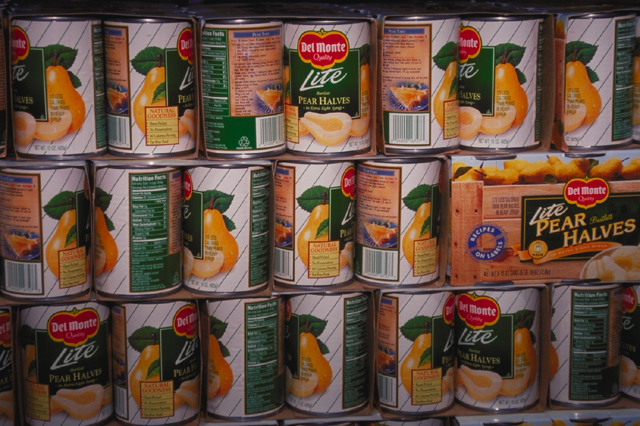
Del Monte Lite Pear Halves

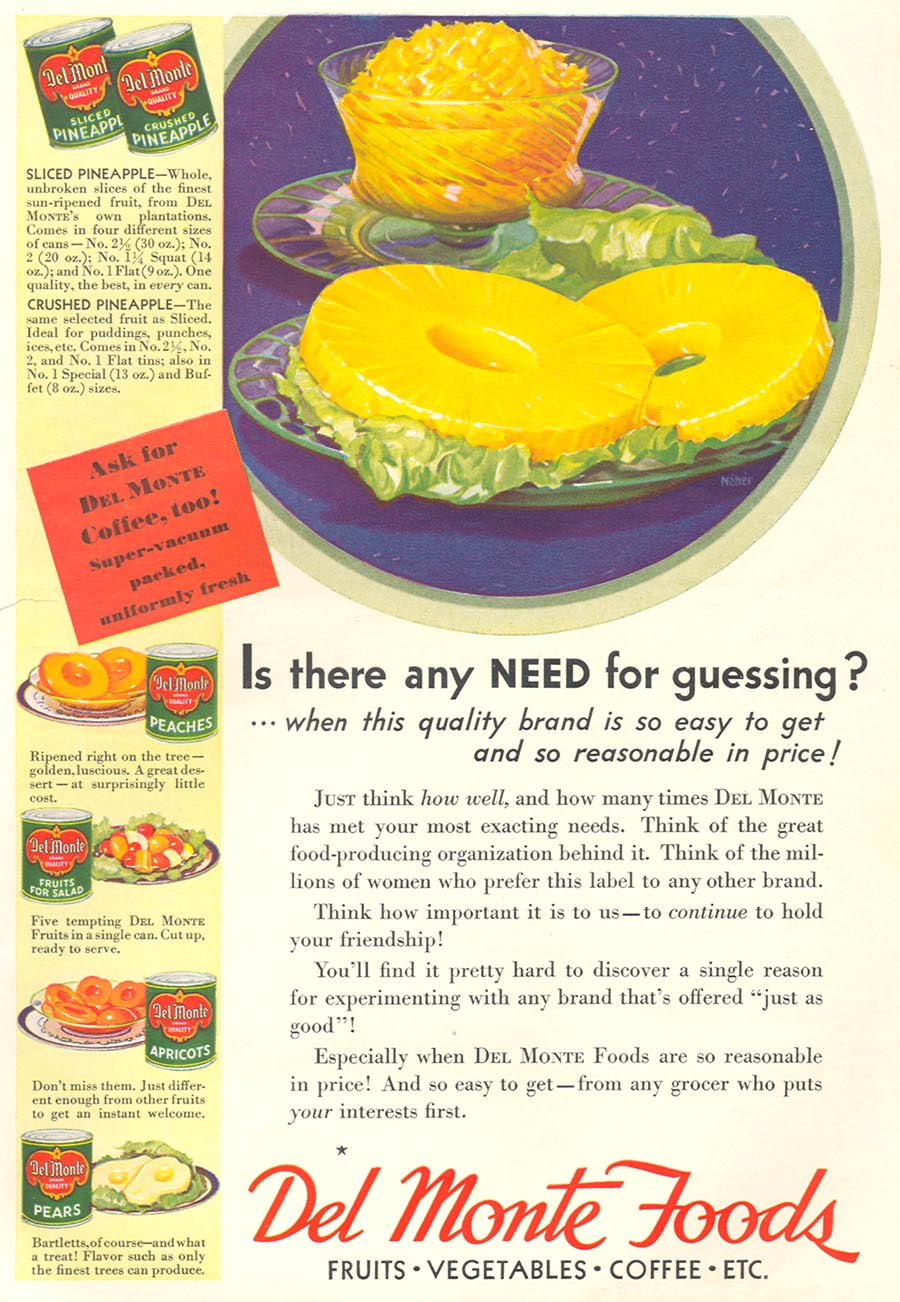
1932 magazine advertisement for a variety of canned fruit products
