= Dali Everyday Grocery =

Swiss international discount retail chain

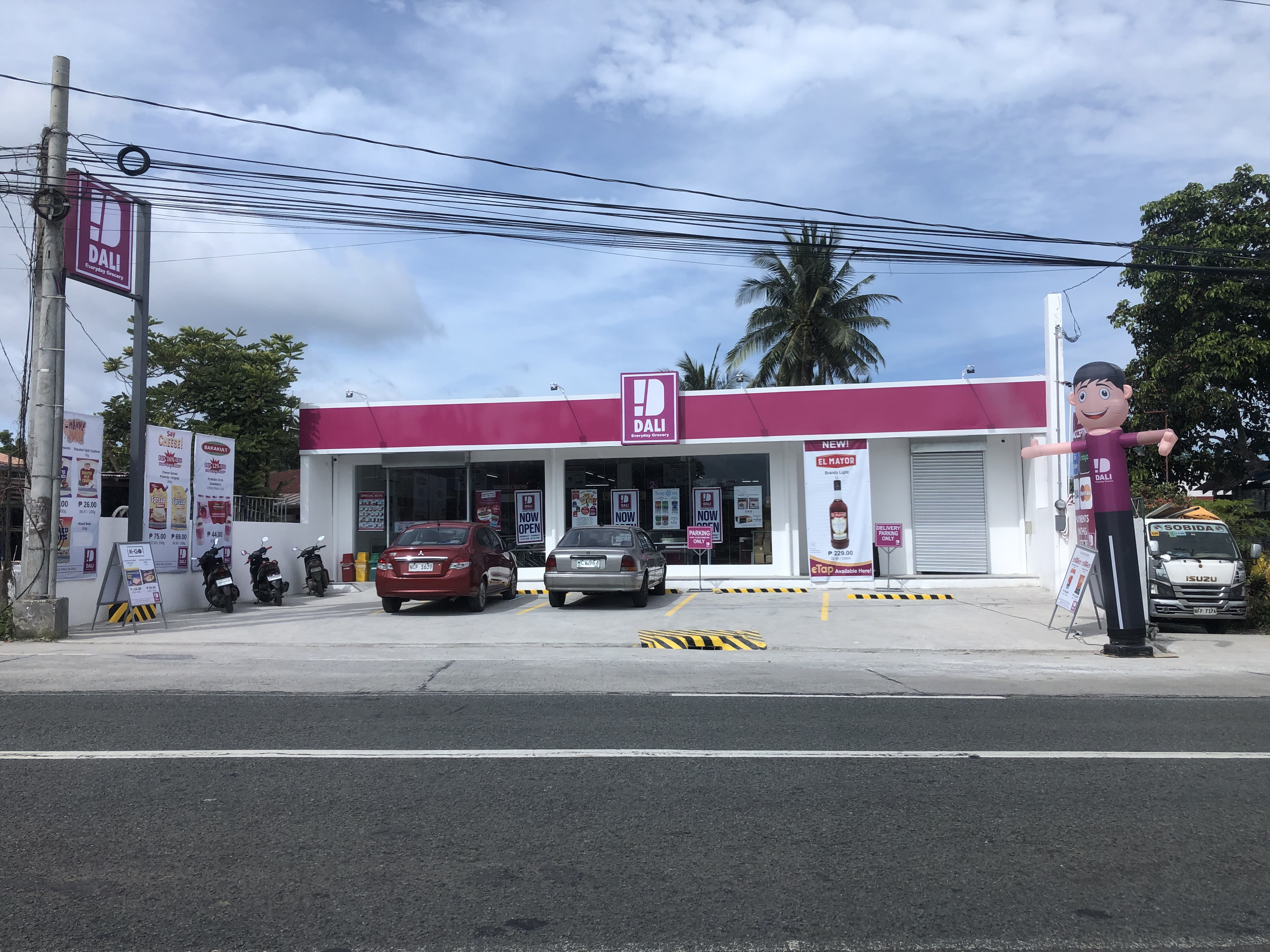
- A branch of Dali Everyday Grocery in Cavite
- Type: Aktiengesellschaft (AG)
- Industry: Retail
- Founded: 2020; 6 years ago
- Headquarters: Zug, Switzerland
- Number of locations: ~900–1000 (2025)
- Area served: Philippines
- Key people: Andreas Höfner (chairman); Joerg Gruenewald (CFO, HDPI)
- Products: Groceries; Consumer goods
- Subsidiaries: HDPM Sin Pte. Ltd. Hard Discount Philippines Inc.
- Website: dali-discount.com dali.ph dalidash.ph

Dali Discount AG, doing business as Dali Everyday Grocery (Note: Sometimes also referred to as Dali Stores.) or simply Dali (stylized in all caps), is a Swiss international hard discount retail chain with a primary focus on Southeast Asia, particularly the Philippines. Its Singapore-based subsidiary, HDPM Sin Pte. Ltd., operates a local subsidiary known as Hard Discount Philippines Inc. (HDPI), which is headquartered in Carmona, Cavite.

It is organized as an Aktiengesellschaft (AG), a German word that is roughly equivalent to a joint-stock company, and is headquartered in Zug, Switzerland. As of 2025, Dali operates about 900–1000 stores in the Philippines.

== Etymology ==
According to a Dali board director, the company's name was inspired by the German discount retailer Aldi, with the spelling altered or anagram to resemble the Filipino word dali, which means "fast". The modification was intended to give the brand a more local identity while also reflecting its emphasis on quick checkout service. The name has no direct relation to Aldi beyond this inspiration.

== History ==
Dali opened its first store in February 2020 in Santa Rosa, Laguna, and by the end of 2022, it had at least 250 stores in the Philippines. In March 2023, the Asian Development Bank (ADB) invested US$15 million to support the retail chain's expansion. Earlier that year, Malaysian-based private equity firm Creador invested US$50 million in Dali's expansion. This followed Philippine-based private equity firm Navegar's undisclosed investment into Dali, which began in August 2022. In 2024, Singapore-based equity firm Venturi Partners invested US$25 million in Dali, while DEG, the investment arm of the German state-owned development bank KfW, invested another US$8.4 million.

In April 2024, the number of stores increased to 630 (all in Luzon), with plans have a total of 950 stores by the end of the year.

In July 2024, Hard Discount Philippines Inc. (HDPI) reported cumulative losses of ₱3.26 billion over three years since opening its first store in the Philippines, according to a financial statement filed with the Securities and Exchange Commission (SEC). HDPI recorded a ₱1.88 billion loss, a 110% increase from the ₱894.68 million loss in 2022. By the end of 2023, Dali's capital deficit was ₱1.29 billion. By end-2024, the company's net loss widened further to ₱1.97 billion (from ₱1.88 billion in 2023) even as revenues grew 52% to almost ₱34 billion. Its independent auditor, SGV & Co., warned that as of December 31, 2024, current liabilities exceeded assets by ₱134.6 million and operating cash flows were negative, raising uncertainty about HDPI's ability to continue as a going concern. Cumulative losses increased the company's deficit to ₱5.23 billion in 2024 (from ₱3.26 billion in 2023), while shareholders infused ₱7.56 billion in 2024 and ₱4.67 billion in 2023 as deposits for future stock subscriptions.

In 2026 Aldi Süd Group acquired an undisclosed minority stake in Dali, which will remain independently managed. The investment will support Dali’s national expansion.

== Business model ==
Dali is the first company in the Philippines to pioneer hard discount retailing in the country, with a focus on underprivileged communities as its primary market. Its stores are leanly staffed, often with just two cashiers and no baggers, which helps reduce labor and stocking costs. They display products in their original boxes and avoid elaborate interiors and extensive advertising costs, akin to a supermarket model originating from Germany. Typically, they are small and located in rural, peri-urban, and lower-income areas rather than city centers.

=== Competition ===
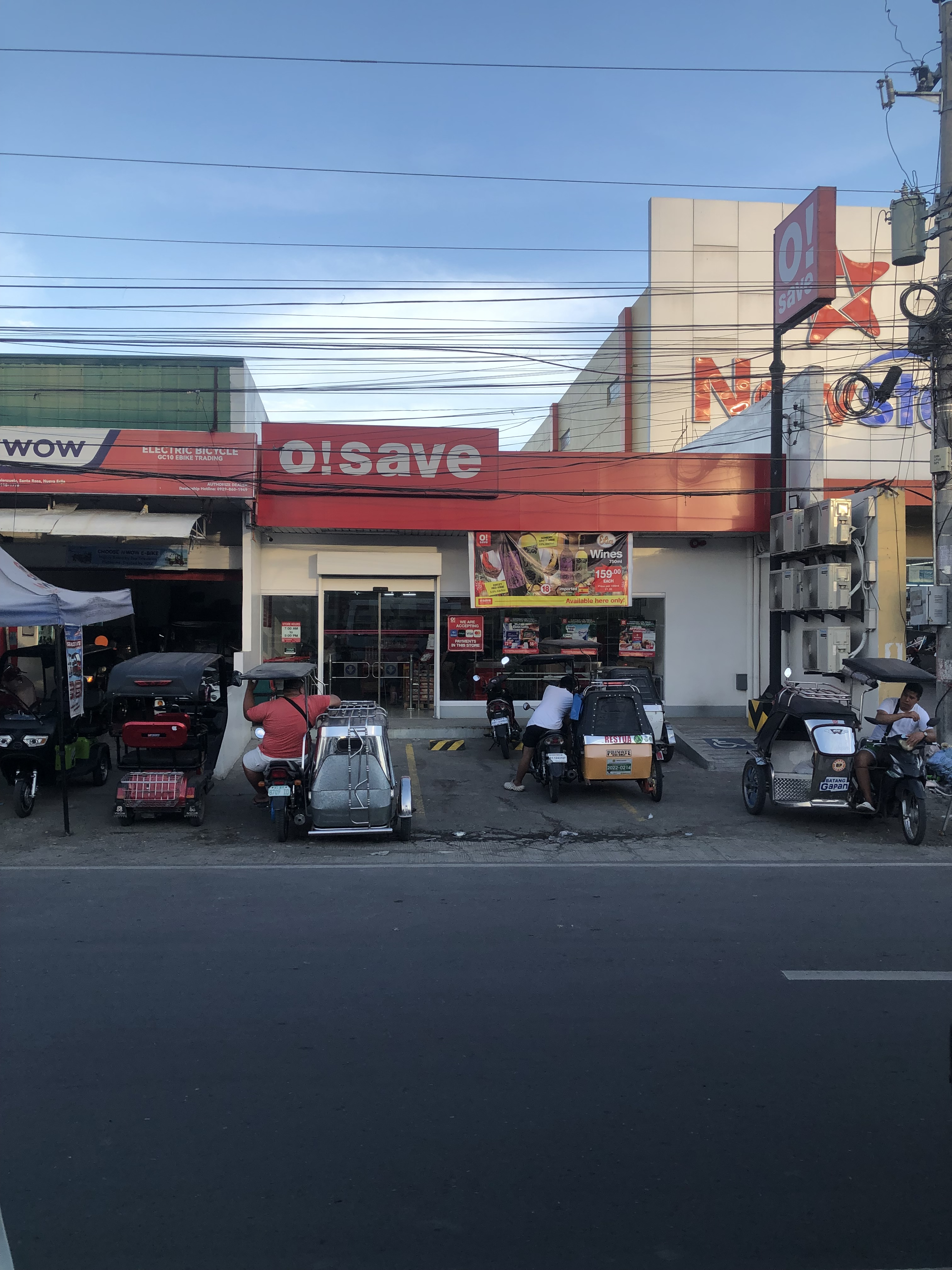
O!Save (a branch in Nueva Ecija pictured) began expanding north of Metro Manila, while Dali expanded south

Dali's main competitor in the hard discount market are Puregold Price Club and O!Save, which is backed by Robinsons Retail. Indonesia-based convenience store chain Alfamart, which is operated in the Philippines by SM Investments, is not a hard discount store but shares the small-format store market with Dali.

== Products ==
Dali's range of products includes everyday household items such as snacks, kitchen staples, and cleaning supplies. While it retails some popular branded items, the majority of its products are proprietary brands that closely resemble well-known ones, bordering on copyright infringement. Dali claims that the quality of their private label products "meets or exceeds the equivalent national brands sold in other national retail chains" while being significantly more affordable. Around 60–70% of its products are sourced locally in the Philippines and the remainder are imported from Malaysia, China, South Korea, and Europe.

== Reactions ==
Writing in The Philippine Star, author and businessman Joey Concepcion described the entry of Dali, a hard discounter, into the Philippine market as a "disruption" to sari-sari stores, which he called "the very symbol of micro-entrepreneurship in the Philippines".

== Controversies ==
=== Alleged unfair business practices ===
On May 16, 2024, consumer advocacy group Malayang Konsyumer filed a complaint with the Fair Trade and Enforcement Bureau of the Department of Trade and Industry (DTI) concerning Dali's alleged unfair business practices, which include inaccurate pricing and weighing of chicken, as well as the erroneous inclusion of items in invoices. In response, the DTI stated that it has opened an investigation and reported that 82 monitored Dali branches complied with the suggested retail price (SRP) and Price Tag Law during routine checks between January and April 2024.

On May 29, the DTI issued a show cause order to Dali, addressing 13 instances of complaints by Malayang Konsyumer, and stated that they would seek the help of the Department of the Interior and Local Government (DILG) to identify the localities where Dali has sanitary issues. However, the DTI noted that the consumer group did not submit a formal complaint but only sent letters expressing their grievances, which lacked the necessary evidence to support their claims against Dali.

=== Intellectual property rights case ===
Comparison photos of products from Dali (Kulina and Rajah Puro) and NutriAsia (UFC and Datu Puti)

In June 2024, the Intellectual Property Office of the Philippines (IPOPHL) disclosed that NutriAsia, a Philippine food processing company, initiated legal action against Hard Discount Philippines Inc., the local operator of Dali, alleging trademark infringement, unfair competition, and copyright infringement. According to IPOPHL documents, the case registered under number V/2023/10 also petitioned the Bureau of Legal Affairs of IPOPHL for the issuance of a writ of preliminary injunction. The following month, Dali was ordered by IPOPHL to remove three products from their shelves that bore a striking resemblance to those of NutriAsia, particularly the condiment brands "Kulina" and "Rajah Puro", whose trade dress and names bear intentional similarities to NutriAsia's UFC and Datu Puti, respectively.
