= Mang =

Mang may refer to:

== Places ==
- Mangshi, county-level city in Yunnan, China
- Mang, Azad Kashmir, Pakistan

== People ==
- Mang (singer) (born 2000), Thai singer
- Anton Mang (born 1949), German motorcycle racer
- Ferdinand Mang (born 1978), German politician
- Henry Mang (1897–1987), Canadian politician
- Mang of Xia, ruler of the Xia Dynasty, China
- Maximilian Mang (born 2000), German-American football player
- Rudolf Mang (1950–2018), German heavyweight weightlifter

=== Groups ===
- Mang people, an ethnic group living primarily in Vietnam
- Mang (caste), a caste of musicians and labourers in India

== Other uses ==
- Mang language, an Austroasiatic language of China and Vietnam
- Maang language is a Lolo-Burmese language of Wenshan Prefecture, Yunnan, China and northern Vietnam.
- Mang, or Mashan Miao language also known as Mashan Hmong, is a Miao language of China.
- 17460 Mang, a main-belt asteroid
- Mang, a bat character in Rudyard Kipling's The Jungle Book
- Mang, a Filipino honorific address to an older male person, as in Mang Kanor or Mang Tomas, almost equivalent to Sir or Mister. The equivalent honorific to an older female person is Aling, as in Aling Lucing.
