= Dwight L. Stuart =

American business executive and philanthropist (1924–1998)

Dwight Lyman Stuart
- Born: 1924; Seattle, Washington, United States
- Died: November 1998 (aged 73–74)
- Occupations: Business executive and philanthropist
- Known for: Former CEO of food brand Carnation

Dwight Lyman Stuart (1924 – November 1998) was an American business executive and philanthropist who led the Los-Angeles-based condensed milk brand Carnation as president and chief executive officer between 1973 and 1983.

== Early life and education ==
Stuart was born in Seattle in 1924, the younger of two sons of Carnation heir Elbridge H. Stuart. He served in the U.S. Navy in World War II and, on discharge, completed a bachelor's degree at the University of Washington in 1947.

== Career ==
Stuart began his career as a milk-plant trainee at Carnation's management-training programme. He rose steadily through the ranks, becoming a director in 1960 and executive vice-president before succeeding his father as president in 1973.

In November 1983, Stuart resigned amid strategic disagreements with chairman H. Everett Olson, retaining an estimated 20% family stake. Rumours of a sale followed, and on 4 September 1984 Nestlé agreed to acquire Carnation for $3 billion. Time credited Stuart's decision to “start unloading his stock” as the spark for the takeover.

In 1987, Carnation, Stuart and his brother Elbridge agreed to a $13 million settlement with shareholders who alleged they had been misled during the share-price run-up preceding the Nestlé announcement. After leaving Carnation, Stuart invested in commercial real-estate projects in Los Angeles and Palm Desert while serving on Carnation's board until the Nestlé deal closed.

== Philanthropy ==
A longtime director of the family-run Stuart Foundation, he supported public-school reform and children’s services across California and Washington. In his will he endowed the Dwight Stuart Youth Fund (formally organized in 2001), which makes multi-million-dollar grants each year to youth-development programmes in Los Angeles County.
