= Alfamart =

Indonesian convenience store chain

PT Sumber Alfaria Trijaya Tbk
- Current logo since 2015

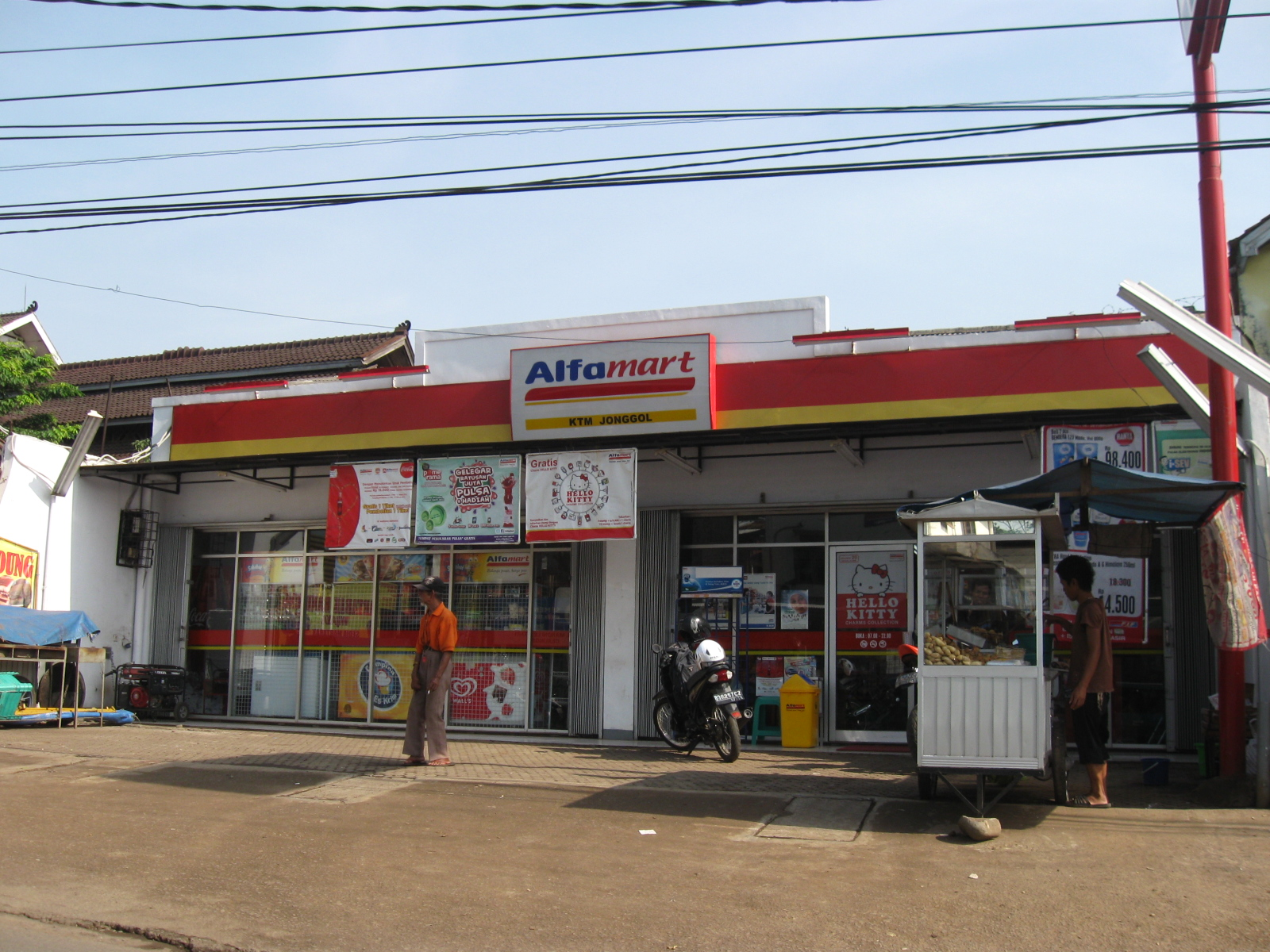
- An Alfamart store in Bogor Regency, West Java
- Trade name: Alfamart
- Type: Public
- Traded as: IDX: AMRT
- Industry: Convenience stores
- Founded: February 22, 1989; 37 years ago
- Founder: Djoko Susanto
- Headquarters: Tangerang, Banten, Indonesia
- Area served: Indonesia (except West Sumatra and Papua provinces); Philippines; Bangladesh
- Key people: Djoko Susanto (President)
- Revenue: ▲ Rp 56.1 trillion (2016)
- Net income: ▲ Rp 553.8 billion (2016)
- Total assets: ▲ Rp 19.474 trillion (2016)
- Number of employees: 42,115 (2022)
- Parent: AlfaCorp
- Subsidiaries: Alfamart Retail Asia Pte, Ltd. (Alfamart Philippines); PT Midi Utama Indonesia Tbk. (MIDI) - (Alfamidi ; 89,43%); PT Lancar Wiguna Sejahtera (Lawson Indonesia); PT Sumber Indah Lestari; PT Sumber Trijaya Lestari; PT Sumber Wahana Sejahtera; PT Global Loyalty Indonesia; PT Trimitra Trans Persada, Tbk. (BLOG)
- Website: www.alfamart.co.id (Indonesia) www.alfamart.com.ph (Philippines)

PT Sumber Alfaria Trijaya Tbk, doing business as Alfamart, is an Indonesian primarily-franchised convenience store chain. As of June 2023, it has over 18,000 stores in 27 provinces spread across Indonesia, with 4 million daily customers and tens of thousands of micro, small and medium-scale business partners. The business was started in December 1989 as a trading and distribution company in Jakarta by its president, Djoko Susanto. Ten years later, Susanto ventured into the convenience store category with Alfa Minimart, with their first branch being in Karawaci, Tangerang, Banten. Later renamed as Alfamart, the convenience store brand has since expanded to the Philippines, with 2,337 branches there since the end of September 2025.

== History ==
Alfamart logo, used from 2003 until 2015. This logo is still used on some stores.

In 1989, Djoko Susanto and his family established a trading and distribution company that sold various products in Jakarta. The distribution company had a corporate share of 70% with Sampoerna and the remaining 30% were with Susanto's PT Sigmantara Alfaindo.

In 1999, Susanto ventured out into the convenience store business, branding it as Alfa Minimart. He opened his first branch at Jalan Beringin Raya, Karawaci, Tangerang, Banten. In the span of six years, Alfa Minimart grew to a total of 1,293 branches along Java. The chain's name was later rebranded as Alfamart.

In 2006, Sampoerna sold its shares to Susanto's Sigmantara Alfaindo. Susanto gained 60% of the company's shares, while the remaining 40% was granted to a new shareholder, PT Mulia Prima Horizons.

In 2009, Alfamart joined the Indonesia Stock Exchange with around 3,000 branches nationwide. The business was renamed as PT Sumber Alfaria Trijaya Tbk. Soon after, Alfamart brought the Lawson stores into Indonesia operated by PT Lancar Wiguna Sejahtera, which was a subsidiary of Alfamidi, while expanding from being solely in the convenience store chain business, to the operation of supermarket stores with Alfamidi Mini Supermarkets.

In 2014, Alfamart had 7,000 branches in Indonesia catering to an average of 2.5 million customers daily. The company reported to have over 14,000 branches by the end of 2019.

After its success in Indonesia, Alfamart expanded into the neighboring country of the Philippines. Its entry into the Philippine market was made through a partnership with SM Investments Corporation, launching its first branch in Trece Martires, Cavite in June 2014. This partnership allowed Alfamart to carry SM Bonus branded grocery item in its stores. Since then, Alfamart has expanded to more than 11 provinces in the Philippines, including 15 cities in Metro Manila. By the end of September 2025, it has grown to 2,337 branches across the country with plans to add 250 new stores by 2026. On October of the same year, SM opened Alfamart for franchising in the Philippines to provide micro, small and medium enterprises (MSMEs) the opportunity to grow alongside its nationwide expansion.

On 15 May 2025, Alfamidi sold Lawson's operating company to Alfamart, which Alfamart acquired it worth of Rp.200 Billion, making Lawson a subsidiary of Alfamart.

In October 2025, Alfamart entered Bangladeshi market on a partnership with Kazi Farms Group.

Now, the parent company of Alfamart, PT Sigmantara Alfindo or AlfaCorp, also owned the larger minimarket chain called Alfamidi which is operated by PT Midi Utama Indonesia Tbk, Alfa Express which also serve coffee and fast food, and AlfaX which combines convenience store with co-working space and targets Generation X and millennials.

== See also ==
- Indomaret
- 7-Eleven
- Lawson
- FamilyMart
- All Day
- Uncle John's (formerly Ministop Philippines)
- Dali Everyday Grocery
- Shwapno
