= All Day Convenience Store =

Filipino convenience store chain

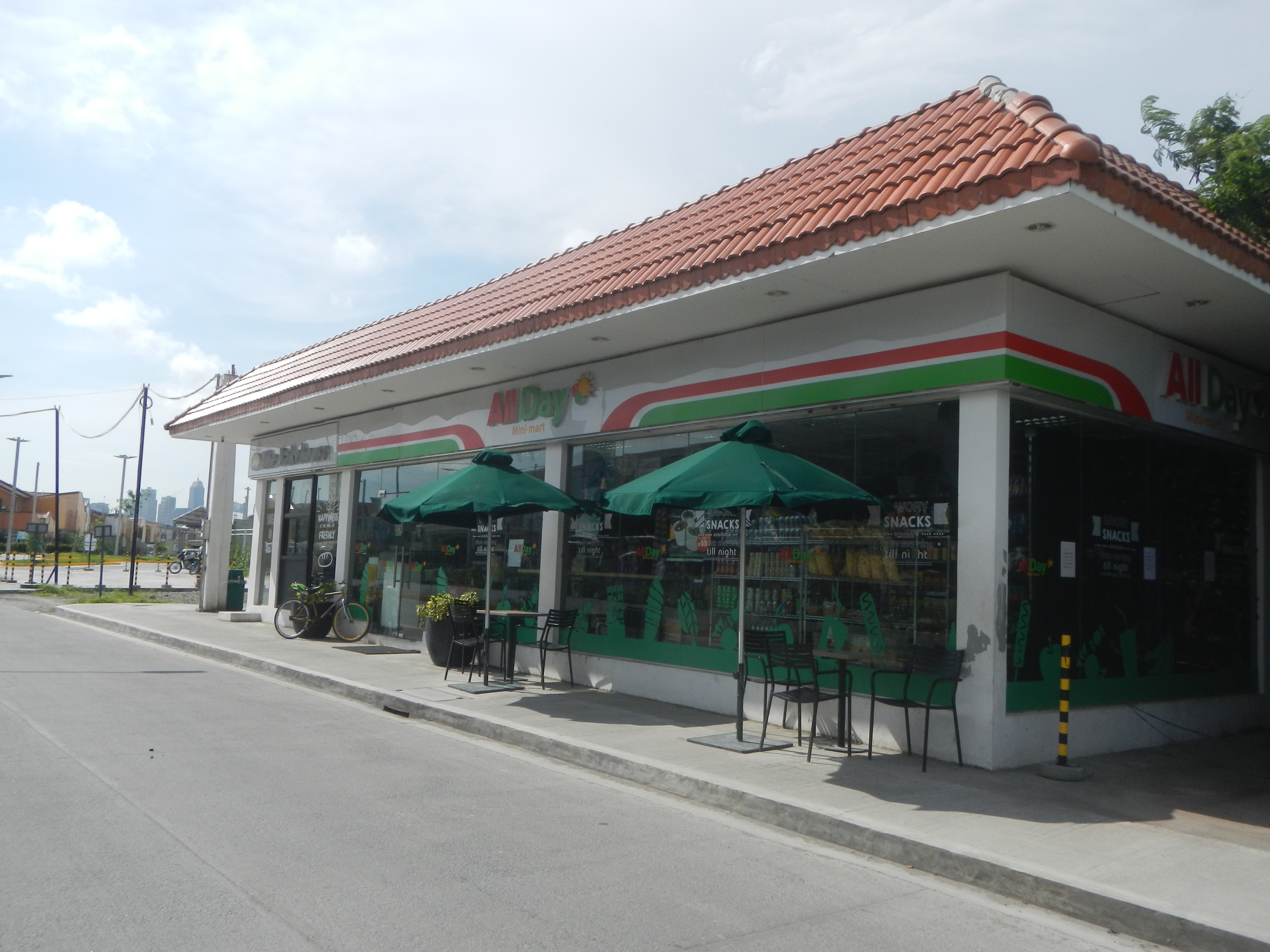
- Store outlet in Taguig City
- Formerly: Finds Convenience Store
- Type: Subsidiary
- Industry: Convenience stores
- Founded: 2008; 18 years ago
- Founder: Manny Villar
- Headquarters: Muntinlupa, Metro Manila, Philippines
- Key people: Manuel "Manny" B. Villar Jr. (Chairman); Manuel "Paolo" A. Villar III (President & CEO)
- Products: All Day Roast Chicken All Day Siomai All Day Siopao
- Owner: Villar Group of Companies
- Parent: All Value Holdings Inc.
- Website: allday.com.ph

All Day Convenience Store is a division of All Value Holdings Inc., a subsidiary of the Villar Group of Companies, owned by entrepreneur and former Philippine senator Manny Villar. It was established as Finds Convenience Store Inc. in 2008.

== History ==
In 2008, former President of the Senate of the Philippines Manny Villar launched Finds Convenience Store Inc. as an experimental business. Finds grew to 40 branches in Metro Manila, serving as a convenience store outlet for his housing business, Camella Homes, and at his mall chain, Starmall.

In 2014, the business rebranded as All Day Convenience Store, expanding to 80 branches, including the conversion of existing Finds branches. Villar expressed plans to develop All Day as a "true Filipino convenience store."

Logo of the supermarket chain bearing the "All Day" brand

In 2015, All Day opened more branches in Luzon, focusing on condominiums, business towers, and residential areas. The company introduced "All Day Mart," a mini-mart format, at Starmall Prima Taguig (now Vista Mall Taguig) in May 2015. It also entered the furniture retail sector with "All Home," expanding to 13 stores by 2016. The brand later launched All Day Supermarket, with initial branches in Vista Mall Taguig, Starmall EDSA Shaw in Mandaluyong, and Vista Mall Sta. Rosa in Santa Rosa, Laguna. By 2016, the supermarket expanded to Bataan and Las Piñas.

The number of All Day Convenience Store locations decreased to around 80 by 2016 due to the conversion of some stores into All Day Mart and All Day Supermarket locations.

== Products and services ==
All Day Convenience Stores offer a range of products and services, including snacks, magazines, groceries, ATM and billing payments, and mobile reloading. The stores also provide their own food options, such as All Day Roast Chicken, All Day Siomai, and All Day Siopao.

== Franchising ==
All Day Convenience Store offers franchising opportunities, with an estimated cost of ₱4 million for a six-year term. This includes store management, operations, and improvement services.

== See also ==
- Manny Villar
- Starmall
- 7-Eleven
- FamilyMart
- Uncle John's
- Alfamart
- WalterMart
