= Djoko Susanto =

Indonesian entrepreneur, businessman and billionaire

- Born: Kwok Kwie Fo 郭貴和; 9 February 1950 (age 76); Jakarta, Indonesia
- Occupations: Founder and CEO of PT Sumber Alfaria Trijaya Tbk
- Known for: Founder of Alfamart

Djoko Susanto, born Kwok Kwie Fo (Chinese: 郭貴和; pinyin: Guō Guì Hé; Pe̍h-ōe-jī: Kueh Kùi Hām; born 9 February 1950) is an Indonesian entrepreneur, successful businessman and well known as a new billionaire of Indonesia since 2011. Susanto was the owner of Alfamart, retail business with mini-marts concept.

== Early life ==
Susanto is the sixth out of 10 siblings, he only reached the 1st grade. He had to drop out of school due to a policy of the new order government that prohibits students with Chinese names from attending public schools. At the age of 17 he started managing his parents' modest 5-foot stall inside Pasar Arjuna, a traditional market in Jakarta. The stall sold groceries at the time, but soon Susanto was peddling cigarettes and opening more stalls. His success attracted the attention of clove cigarette tycoon Putera Sampoerna. Together they opened similar stalls and then opened a discount supermarket chain.

== Business empire ==
Susanto continued his partnership with Putera Sampoerna until 2005, then Sampoerna sold his cigarettes business, 70% of his share to Altria including his share on the retail business run by Susanto. Altria did not desire on retail business and then sold their shares to Northstar, but Susanto later bought the shares from Northstar, making him own the major share of 65%. He later developed the retail business into Alfa Supermarket. Nowadays, under the management of PT. Sumber Alfaria Trijaya Tbk, they run more than 5,500 stores under several brands such as Alfamart, Alfa Express, Alfa Midi and Lawson. Thus business made Susanto become the 25th wealthiest person in Indonesia on 2011, and rose to rank 17th on early 2012, decrease to 20th by November 2012.
