= Del Monte (company) =

American food company

Del Monte Corporation
- Type: Public
- Traded as: NYSE: DMC; S&P 600 Component; Russell 2000 Component
- Industry: Agriculture
- Predecessor: Del Monte Foods; Fresh Del Monte
- Founded: 1886; 140 years ago
- Headquarters: Coral Gables, Florida, U.S.
- Key people: Mohammad Abu-Ghazaleh (Chairman & CEO); Mohammed Abbas (President & COO); Monica Vicente (SVP & CFO)
- Products: Canned fruits Fresh fruits Fruit juice
- Revenue: ▼US$4.32 billion (2023)
- Number of employees: 45,000
- Website: delmontecorporation.com

Del Monte Corporation (previously Fresh Del Monte Produce Incorporated) is an American producer, distributor, and marketer of prepared, fresh and fresh-cut fruits and vegetables. Incorporated in George Town, Cayman Islands, its US executive office is located at 241 Sevilla Avenue, Coral Gables, Florida.

In 2026, the company acquired select assets from Del Monte Foods, including the global rights to the Del Monte brand. Following the acquisition, the company changed its corporate name to Del Monte Corporation and it's ticker symbol on the NYSE to DMC.

Their products include fresh and fresh-cut fruit and vegetables, refrigerated and prepared foods, shelf-stable products, juices, beverages, snacks, and desserts sold under the Del Monte brand in Europe, Middle East and Africa. Its key products are its Del Monte Gold pineapple, its Pinkglow® pineapple, its Honeyglow® pineapple, and its Rubyglow® pineapple.

Del Monte also operates a shipping line called Network Shipping and has a trucking operation called Tricont Trucking. In addition, they have food and beverage operations that sell freshly prepared food products in convenient locations.

== History ==
=== Foundation ===
In the 1870s and 1880s, California became a major producer of fruits and vegetables.

The Hotel Del Monte was a famous resort hotel on the Monterey Peninsula which first built what is now Pebble Beach Golf Links.

In the 1880s, a small Oakland, California, food distributor was hired to make products for the hotel. It later used the Del Monte brand name to market a premium blend of coffee that had been prepared for the hotel.

By 1892, the firm expanded its business and selected Del Monte as the brand name for its new line of canned peaches. In 1899, the California Fruit Canners Association (CFCA) formed when 18 West Coast canning companies merged. The Del Monte brand was one of several brands marketed by the new company. It introduced the Del Monte Shield in 1909.

In 1916, California Packing Corporation (CalPak), was founded as a merger of five canning, drying, broker, farmer, and packing businesses: California Fruit Canners Association, Griffin & Skelley (a food brokerage house), Central California Canneries, J.K. Armsby Company and the Alaska Packers Association, selling its products under the Del Monte and Sunkist brands. The new company grew to operate more than 60 canneries in Washington, Oregon, Idaho, Utah and Alaska. In 1917, it acquired pineapple farms and a cannery in Hawaii and, in the 1920s, added canneries in Florida and the Midwest, as well as in the Philippines. After WWII, it constructed or purchased more facilities overseas. These multinational operations made the name California Packing Corporation obsolete, and in June 1967, the corporation adopted the name of its leading brand to become Del Monte Corporation.

In 1972, Del Monte became the first major US food processor to voluntarily adopt nutritional labeling on all its food products. Del Monte became part of R.J. Reynolds Industries, Inc. (later RJR Nabisco, Inc.), in 1979.

=== Fresh Del Monte Produce ===
After having been acquired by Kohlberg Kravis Roberts in 1988, RJR Nabisco sold several Del Monte divisions. The fresh fruit business named Fresh Del Monte Produce (FDP) was sold to Polly Peck. Later, Mexican businessman Carlos Cabal Peniche acquired FDMP after Polly Peck collapsed. After Peniche fled Mexico and his company was seized by that country's government.

Fresh Del Monte was acquired by Mohammed Abu-Ghazaleh in 1996 and went public a year later. Later, it acquired Del Monte Europe in 2004 and the American vegetable packaging company Mann Packing in 2018. Fresh Del Monte Produce sold Mann Packing to Church Brothers in 2025.

In January 2026, it was announced that FDP had agreed to acquire the bulk of assets of California-based Del Monte Foods for approximately $285 million through a court-supervised sale under Section 363 of the U.S. Bankruptcy Code. The assets to be acquired include Del Monte Foods’ vegetable, tomato and refrigerated fruit businesses and associated brands and facilities, with the deal subject to final court approval and customary regulatory clearances.

=== Del Monte Corporation ===
In July 2026, the company changed its corporate name to Del Monte Corporation and its ticker symbol on the NYSE to DMC.

== Del Monte Kenya ==
Del Monte Kenya is a subsidiary of Del Monte Corporation involved in the cultivation, production, and canning of pineapple products.

However, the Florida-based company is not affiliated with Del Monte Pacific Limited and Del Monte Philippines, Del Monte Panamerican in Central America, or Del Monte Asia Pte Ltd which is a part of the Kikkoman Corporation.

Except for its Kenyan unit, the firms using the name continue to market pineapples, bananas, and other produce under a licensing agreement for the Del Monte label in their respective exclusive geographical territories.

== Advertising ==
The Man from Del Monte was a worldwide advertising campaign for the company. A series of 25 television advertisements ran from 1985 to 1991, featuring British actor Brian Jackson in the title role. The man, wearing a linen suit and Panama hat, arrived at various plantations to assess the quality of the produce for sale under the Del Monte brand. The man indicated his approval upon which the workers would celebrate, stating that "The man from Del Monte, he say yes!" The campaign was revived in Spain and Italy in 2015, with a younger actor. The campaign was masterminded by American marketing company McCann Erickson.

== See also ==
- Chiquita Brands International
- Dole plc
- Fyffes
