= Contadina =

Brand of Italian-inspired food products

- Type: Subsidiary
- Headquarters: San Francisco, California, United States
- Area served: United States
- Owner: Del Monte Corporation
- Website: www.contadina.com

Contadina is a brand of Italian-inspired tomato products and bread crumbs owned by Del Monte Corporation.

== History ==
The brand was established in 1914 by Aiello Brothers & Company. A Chicago wholesaler, Antonio Morici, through Italo Canning bought the entire production of Contadina. By 1918, the Aiello Brothers grew short of capital and Italo Canning purchased their cannery. In the same year, Augustino Morici signed the trademark for Contadina. The Aiellos were then employed by the Morici family. The Carnation Company acquired the brand in 1963; Del Monte Foods acquired the brand of canned tomato products and certain other lines from Nestlé (which acquired Carnation in 1985) in December 1997.

On July 1, 2025, Del Monte Foods filed for Chapter 11 bankruptcy protection in an effort to implement terms of a financial restructuring agreement with its lenders, seeking around $912.6 million in debtor-in-possession financing, as well as $165 million in additional funding.

Contadina's products include tomato paste, tomato purée, tomato sauce, diced tomatoes, stewed tomatoes, crushed tomatoes, pizza sauce, as well as a few other products. In the early 1990s, Contadina also sold a "fresh" refrigerated bake-at-home pizza kit in grocery stores, though it received faint praise as "better than frozen", but not as good as a pizzeria pie.

The word contadina is Italian for 'peasant' in the feminine grammatical gender. Contadina products feature an image of a young woman in a field, holding a basket of Roma tomatoes.
