= H. Everett Olson =

- Born: 1906
- Died: November 17, 1985 (aged 79); Los Angeles, California, U.S.
- Occupation: Business executive
- Known for: Chairman and CEO of Carnation Company
- Spouse: Inez Olson
- Children: 3

H. Everett Olson (1906 – November 17, 1985) was an American business executive who was president, chief executive officer, and chairman of the Carnation Company, a Los Angeles-based food and dairy products manufacturer. He led the company for more than two decades and remained its chairman until its acquisition by Nestlé in 1985.

== Career ==
Olson joined Carnation in 1931 as an assistant controller at the company's plant in Oconomowoc, Wisconsin, and rose steadily through the ranks of the food company over the following three decades. An accountant by training, he was named president of Carnation in 1963, succeeding A. M. Ghormley, and assumed the role of chief executive officer in 1968. In 1971, he became chairman of the board following the retirement of long-time chairman E. H. Stuart.

During his tenure, Carnation expanded its product line and made several acquisitions, including Contadina, a California-based canned tomato processor purchased in 1963, and Trenton Foods, a supplier of canned meats and sauces, in 1966. The company also acquired Pronto Pacific and a Western Farmers Association processing plant to expand its dry and frozen potato business, and in 1970 purchased Reliable Tool, which complemented Carnation's tin-can operations. Carnation also invested in firms engaged in genetic research and the artificial insemination of livestock. Olson oversaw the introduction of several consumer products that became staples of the Carnation brand, including Carnation Instant Breakfast, Mighty Dog canned dog food, and Friskies Buffet canned cat food.

In 1973, Olson directed Carnation's purchase of Herff Jones, a manufacturer of class rings, graduation regalia, and other scholastic products, and announced an agreement to acquire the truck-trailer manufacturer Timpte Industries. The Timpte transaction collapsed after Carnation's stock price fell sharply in response to the proposed deal.

In January 1985, Carnation was acquired by the Swiss food manufacturer Nestlé for approximately US$3 billion. Olson, who had been chief executive of the independent corporation until the sale was completed on January 30 of that year, continued as chairman following the acquisition. He retired later in 1985 and was succeeded as chief executive by Timm Crull.
