= Lawson (store) =

Japanese convenience store chain, originally American

Lawson, Inc.

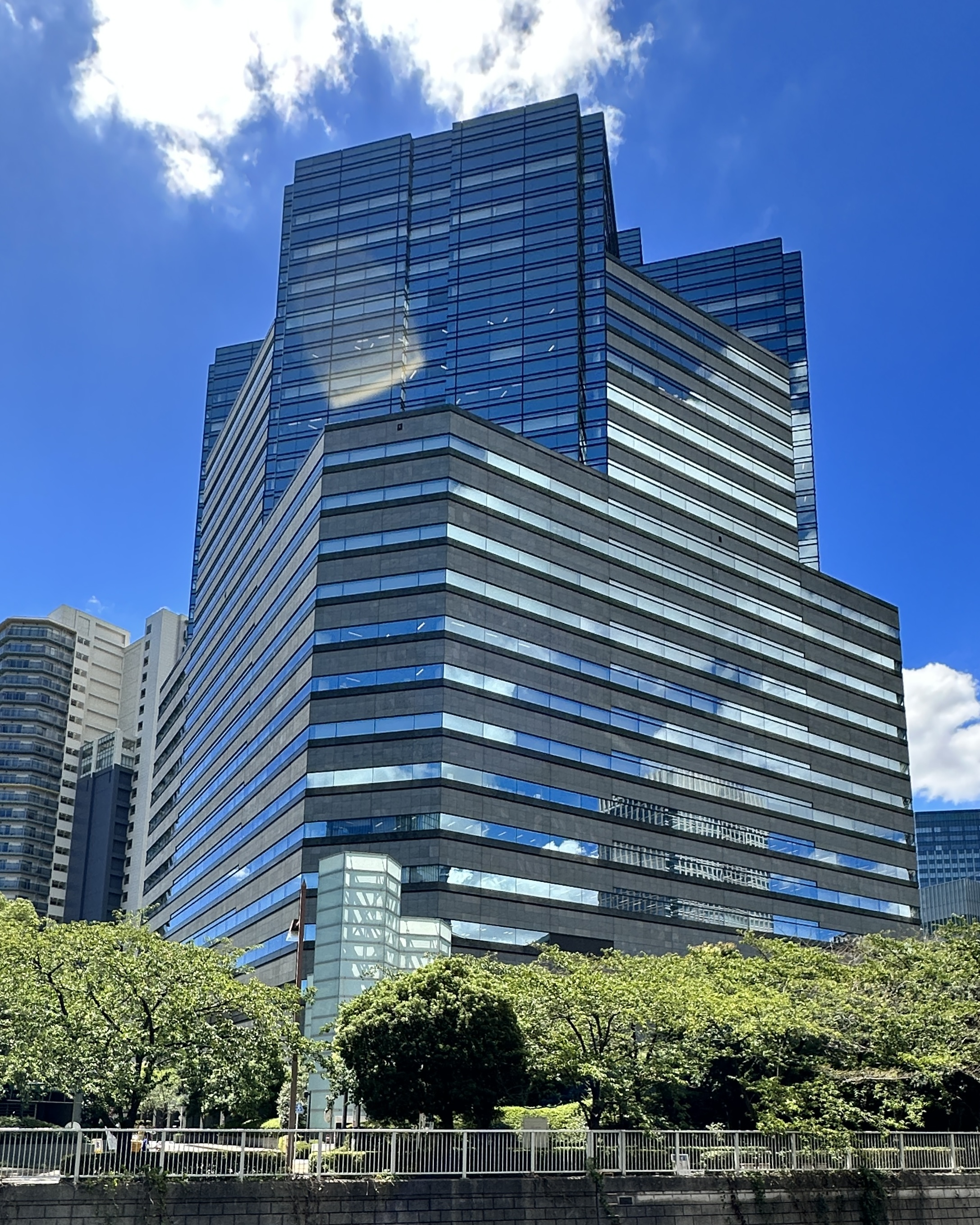
- Lawson's headquarters at Gate City Ōsaki in Ōsaki, Tokyo
- Native name: 株式会社ローソン
- Romanized name: Kabushiki gaisha Rōson
- Type: Public
- Traded as: TYO: 2651 (delisted on July 24, 2024)
- Industry: Retail
- Founded: 1939; 87 years ago in Cuyahoga Falls, Ohio; 1975; 51 years ago in Tokyo, Japan
- Founder: James "J.J." Lawson
- Defunct: 1985 (in the United States; stores sold to Dairy Mart and most of them are now Circle K stores)
- Headquarters: Shinagawa, Tokyo, Japan
- Number of locations: 18,052 (July 2021)
- Area served: Japan; China; Philippines; Thailand; Indonesia; United States (1939-1985, currently Hawaii)
- Key people: Sadanobu Takemasu (President)
- Owner: Mitsubishi Corporation (50%); KDDI (50%)
- Number of employees: 4,470 (non-consolidated, 2017)
- Divisions: HMV Japan
- Website: www.lawson.jp

Lawson, Inc. (株式会社ローソン, Kabushiki gaisha Rōson) is a convenience store franchise chain in the Asia-Pacific region. The store originated in the United States in Cuyahoga Falls, Ohio, but exists today as a Japanese company based in Shinagawa, Tokyo. The company has its headquarters in East Tower of Gate City Ohsaki in Ōsaki, Shinagawa, Tokyo.

== History ==
=== Origins in Ohio ===
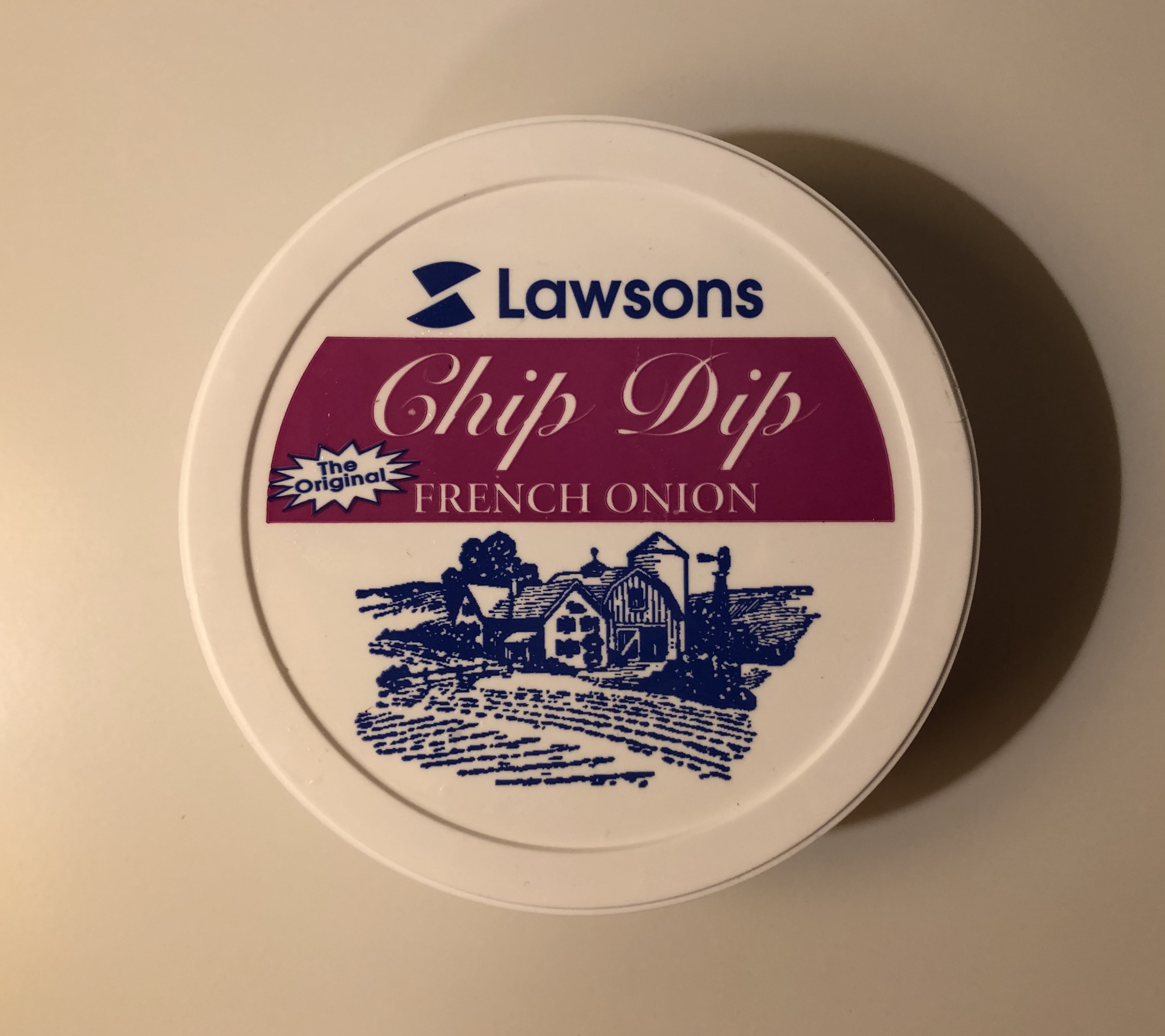
A tub of Lawson's French onion chip dip from a Circle K store in Bowling Green, Ohio

In 1939, dairy owner James "J.J." Lawson started a store at his Broad Boulevard dairy plant in Cuyahoga Falls, Ohio, to sell his milk. The Lawson's Milk Company grew into a chain of stores, primarily in Ohio. Lawson was bought out by Consolidated Foods in 1959.

Lawson's neighborhood convenience stores were common in Ohio from the 1960s through the mid-1980s, selling milk, bread, eggs, orange juice, and specialty items such as deli counter "chipped" style ham and sour cream potato chip dips. Locations also extended into neighboring states such as Pennsylvania, where Lawson's had a presence in the western portion of the state, including Pittsburgh.

Consolidated Foods was renamed Sara Lee in 1985. At about the same time, Lawson's stores in the United States were sold to Dairy Mart, a smaller chain of convenience stores located in Enfield, Connecticut. Dairy Mart moved its headquarters to Cuyahoga Falls, renamed the Lawson's stores, and operated the chain as Dairy Mart for the next 17 years. Dairy Mart was sued by the American Family Association, after a Dairy Mart manager in Ohio complained that the company's policy of selling pornography subjected her to sexual and religious harassment. The court case, Stanley v. Lawson Co., was seen as a test of the First Amendment to the United States Constitution. The court ultimately ruled in favor of Lawson. In 2001, Dairy Mart filed for Chapter 11 bankruptcy protection in an effort to seek a new management team and regain financial stability.

In 2002, Alimentation Couche-Tard, a Canada-based convenience store conglomerate, bought the assets and name of Dairy Mart. Most of the former Dairy Mart stores, which were either originally Lawson's stores, or were located in communities in which Lawson's once had a presence, were converted to the Circle K brand. Some independently owned Dairy Mart stores in Ohio survived independent of Circle K and continued to use the Dairy Mart name and final logo under license from Alimentation Couche-Tard. Nine stores still licensed the Dairy Mart brand as of 2022.

Circle K retains a large presence in Ohio to this day due to the enduring legacy of Lawson's, especially in Northeast Ohio and Columbus, primarily competing with Speedway. However, many of the former Lawson's stores under Dairy Mart in Pennsylvania closed during the late 1990s, and only a few survived by the time Circle K took over the locations. Much of this can be attributed to stronger competition in Pennsylvania from 7-Eleven and Altoona-based Sheetz, as well as UniMart and United Refining Company. Additionally, unlike in Ohio, Dairy Mart failed to invest in fuel sales at its Pennsylvania stores. Circle K retains a small presence in Western Pennsylvania today, but unlike Ohio is a non-factor in the area going up against Sheetz, 7-Eleven/Speedway, GetGo, and locally owned Coen Markets, though Couche-Tard would acquire GetGo in 2025 with initial plans to run it separate from Circle K.

One enduring legacy that continues to the present day of Lawson's former American presence has been its chip dip. After initially continuing under the Lawson's name in the 17 years after the stores themselves rebranded to Dairy Mart, due to demand from consumers, Couche-Tard announced that Lawson's branded chip dip would continue to be sold no matter what the name of the store. Lawson's chip dip eventually expanded to include its availability at all Circle K locations in its Great Lakes division, including at stores that were never affiliated with Lawson's/Dairy Mart, and are still sold in Lawson's-era packaging except with the Circle K logo affixed near the nutrition label for copyright purposes. Following Couche-Tard finalizing its deal to buy GetGo, GetGo also started carrying Lawson's chip dip; however, locations that had to be divested to MAPCO by order of the Federal Trade Commission stopped carrying the chip dip since it is a private label product of Circle K.

=== Presence in Japan ===
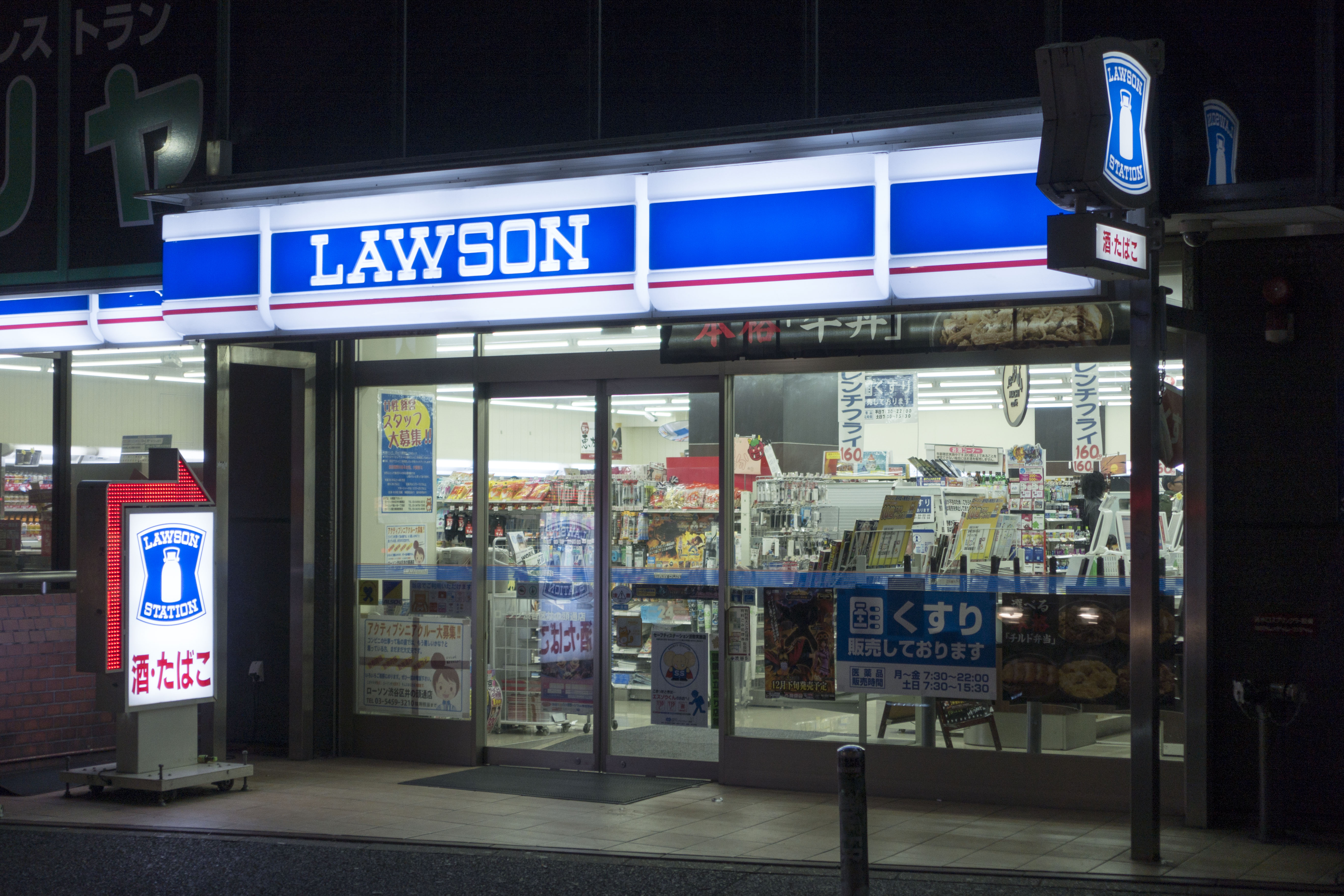
A Lawson store in Kōtō, Tokyo

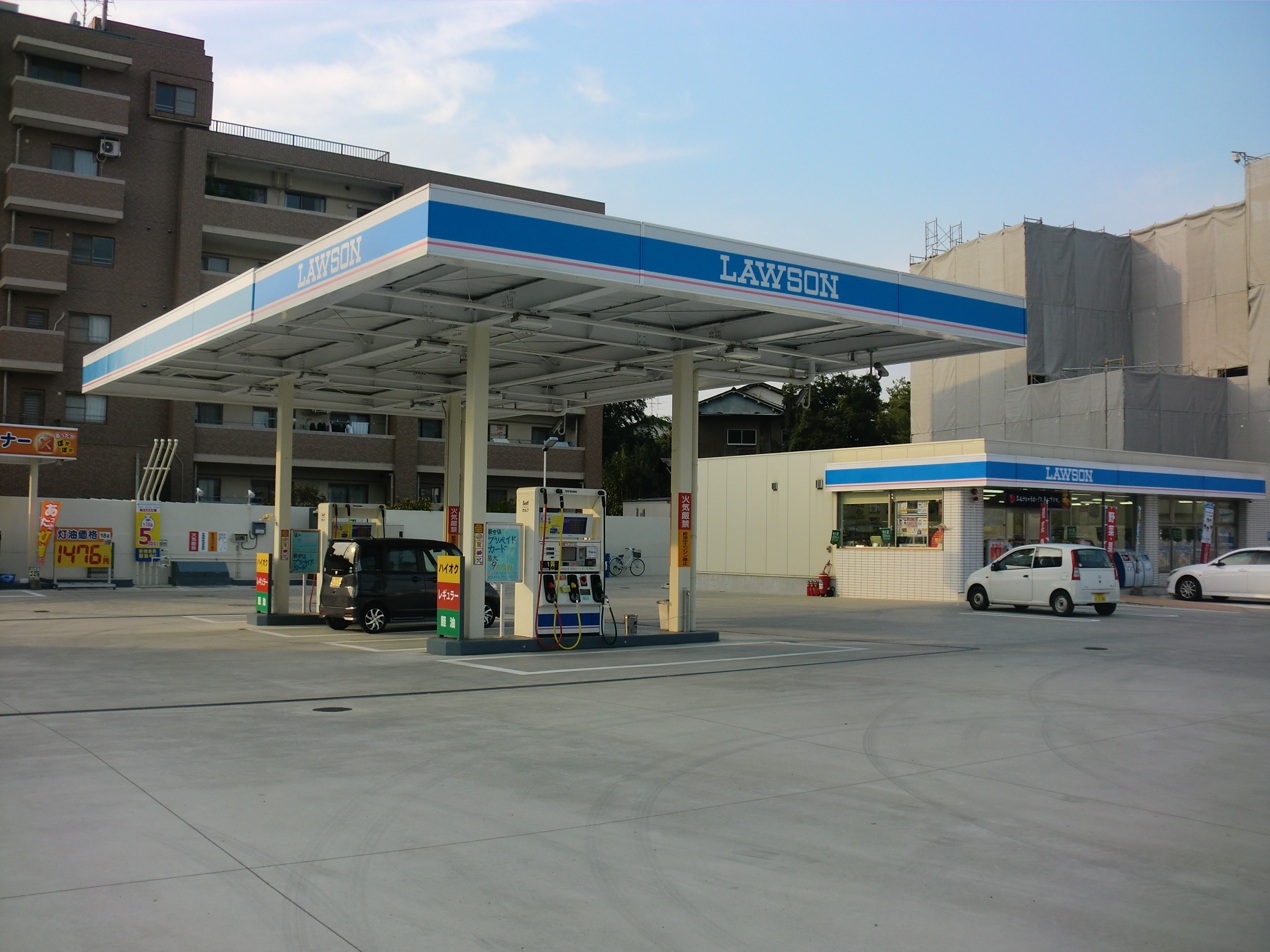
A Lawson self-service station with attached convenience store in Shingū, Fukuoka, Japan

In 1974, Consolidated signed a formal agreement with The Daiei, Inc., a retail company which also ran a supermarket chain, to open the first Lawson stores in Japan. On April 15, 1975, Daiei Lawson Co., Ltd. was established as a wholly owned subsidiary of Daiei. The first store opened in Sakurazuka, Toyonaka, Osaka Prefecture, in June 1975. In September 1979 the official name was changed to Lawson Japan, Inc. The Mitsubishi Corporation became the main shareholder in 2001.

Lawson is one of the biggest convenience store chains in Japan, following 7-Eleven and FamilyMart. All of the usual Japanese convenience store goods, such as magazines, video games, manga, soft drinks, onigiri, pastry roulette and bento are available. Lawson has occasionally collaborated on tie-ins with various companies, including Koei's PlayStation 3 game Dynasty Warriors 7. In celebration of the 25th anniversary of the manga series JoJo's Bizarre Adventure, a Lawson store in author Hirohiko Araki's native Sendai was remodeled to look like the "Owson" store that appears in part 4 of the series. In late 2013, a crossover with All Japan Pro Wrestling saw Triple Crown heavyweight wrestling champion Kohei Suwama appear in ads and even work the till for a photo-op in a Tokyo location. In early 2016, a Lawson-sponsored Power Cube was introduced into the online game Ingress. DDM and Kadokawa's Kantai Collection also tapped Lawson in limited promotional materials, featuring character representations of shipgirls such as Kashima in Lawson crew outfits, whose popularity persisted long after the promo.

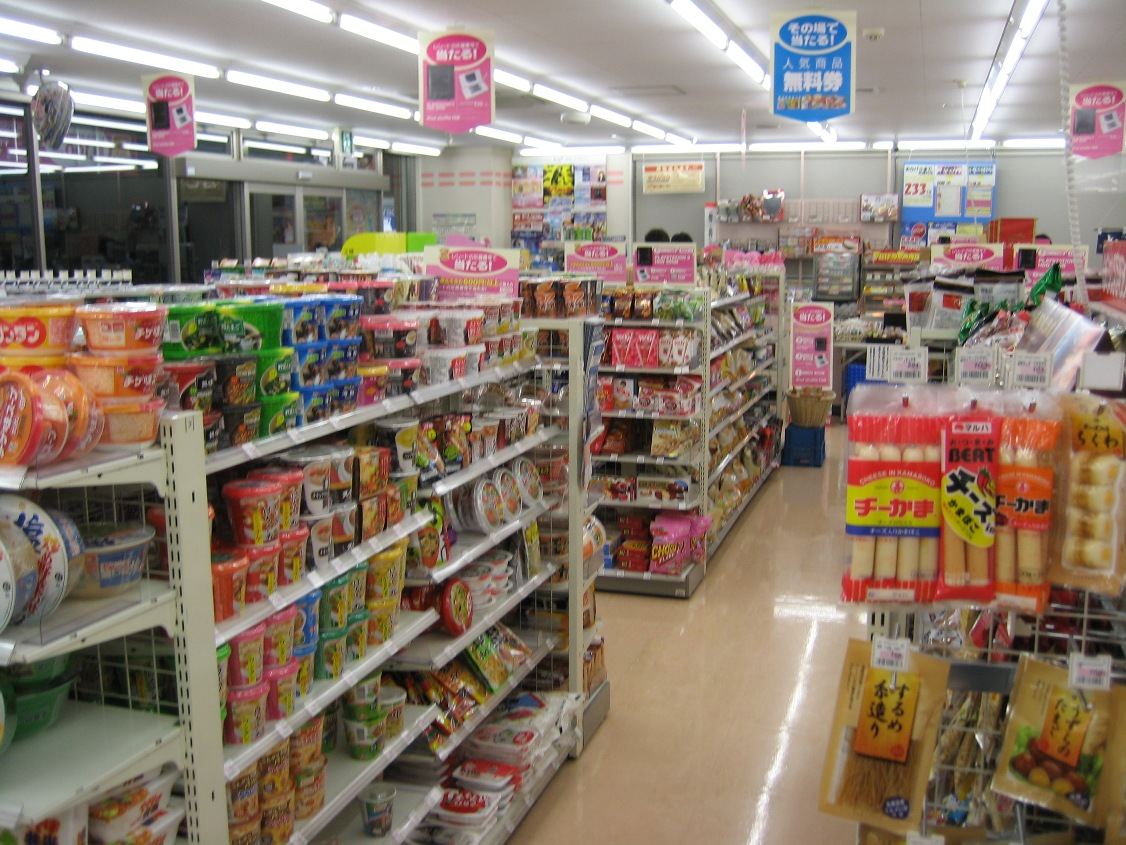
Inside a Lawson in Ontakesan, Tokyo

To date, Lawson operates over 11,384 stores. They are found in all 47 prefectures of Japan, as well as China, Indonesia, Thailand, the Philippines and United States (see below). In 2014, the company announced plans to open stores specifically designed for elderly consumers.

In September 2014, Lawson announced that it would acquire Japanese chain Seijo Ishii Co. for around $503 million from Marunouchi Capital.

In October 2016, Lawson announced it was partnering with The Bank of Tokyo-Mitsubishi UFJ. After receiving the appropriate license from the Japanese Financial Services Agency, the move would allow Lawson stores to offer cash withdrawal, deposit and transfer services, over and above the ATM services that are already provided.

In February 2017, Lawson became a subsidiary of Mitsubishi Corp.

In 2005, Lawson opened its first "Lawson 100" store, where items are ¥100 plus ¥5 tax for a total of ¥105 (equivalent to ¥119.64 in 2024).

In July 2024, Lawson delisted from the Tokyo Stock Exchange following its takeover by KDDI.

== Environmental commitment ==
As of May 2012, Lawson had solar equipment at 20 of its stores, but the company announced in June 2012 that it would install solar panels at 2,000 of its 10,000 Japanese stores. It was estimated that each store would generate about 11,000 kWh per year. Just under 2,000 kWh of this would go toward climate control and other in-house uses, which would account for about 1% of each store's power consumption. The rest of the electricity would be sold under Japan's feed-in tariff system that came into operation on July 1, 2012. It was estimated that the company's income from the power generated by the 2,000 stores would come to more than ¥700 million a year.

Lawson planned to install solar panels at 1,000 stores in the 2012–2013 financial year, and 1,000 more in the 2013–2014 financial year. It chose solar panels from Solar Frontier, along with the same company's online monitoring system, for the first 1,000 stores.

== In other countries ==
=== China ===
Lawson has more than 5,200 stores in China, which are found in and around six major cities: Chongqing, Beijing, Shenyang, Shanghai, Shenzhen and Wuhan. The Shanghai region is the largest, with more than 2,000 locations.

=== Indonesia ===
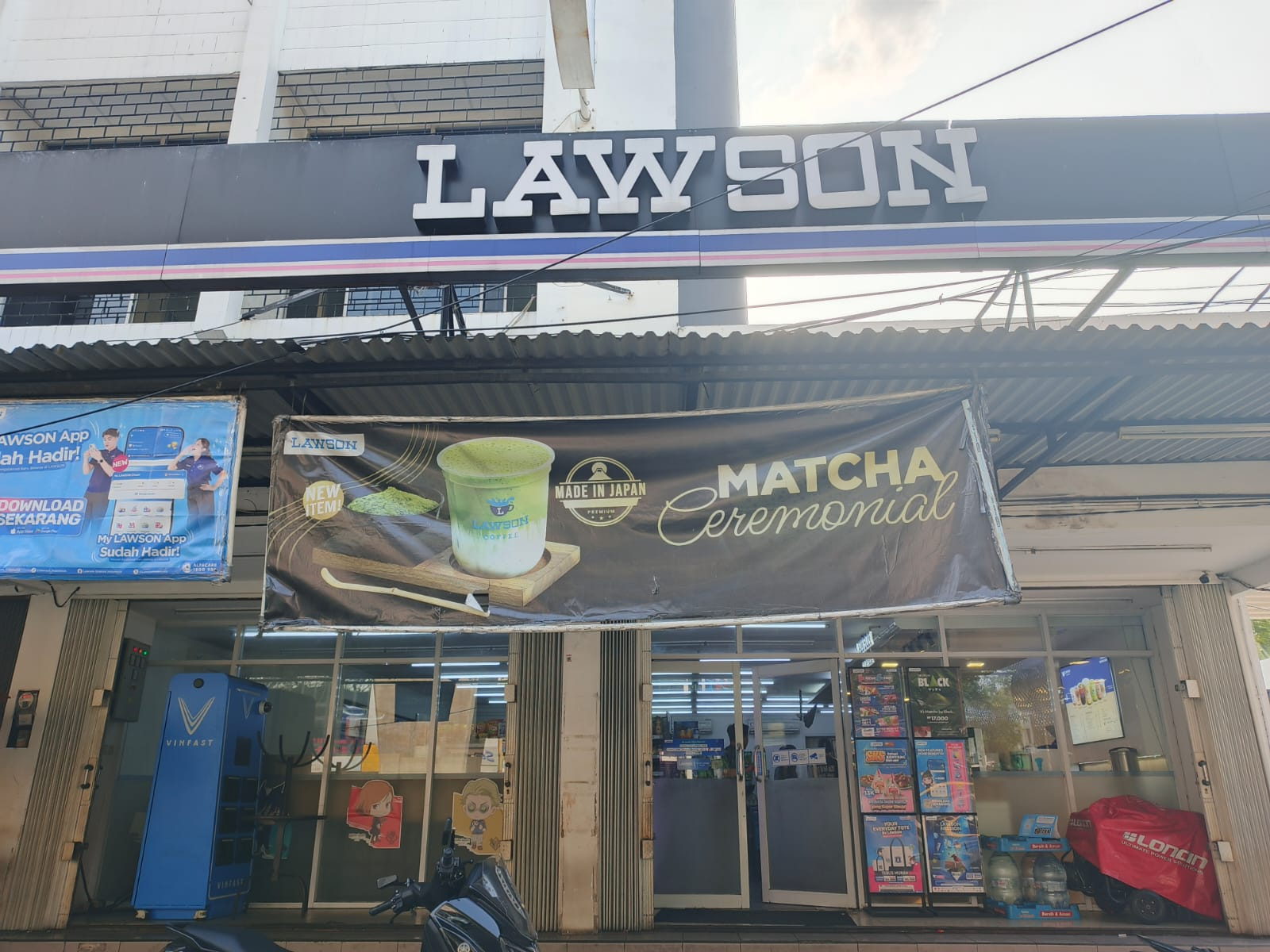
Lawson in Jakarta, Indonesia

In August 2011, Lawson opened its first Indonesian store in Jakarta. In Indonesia, Lawson (operated by PT Lancar Wiguna Sejahtera) was a subsidiary of Alfamidi (PT Midi Utama Indonesia Tbk), a subsidiary of Alfamart.

On 15 May 2025, Alfamidi sold Lawson's operating company to Alfamart, which acquired it worth of Rp.200 billion, making Lawson a subsidiary of Alfamart.

=== United States ===
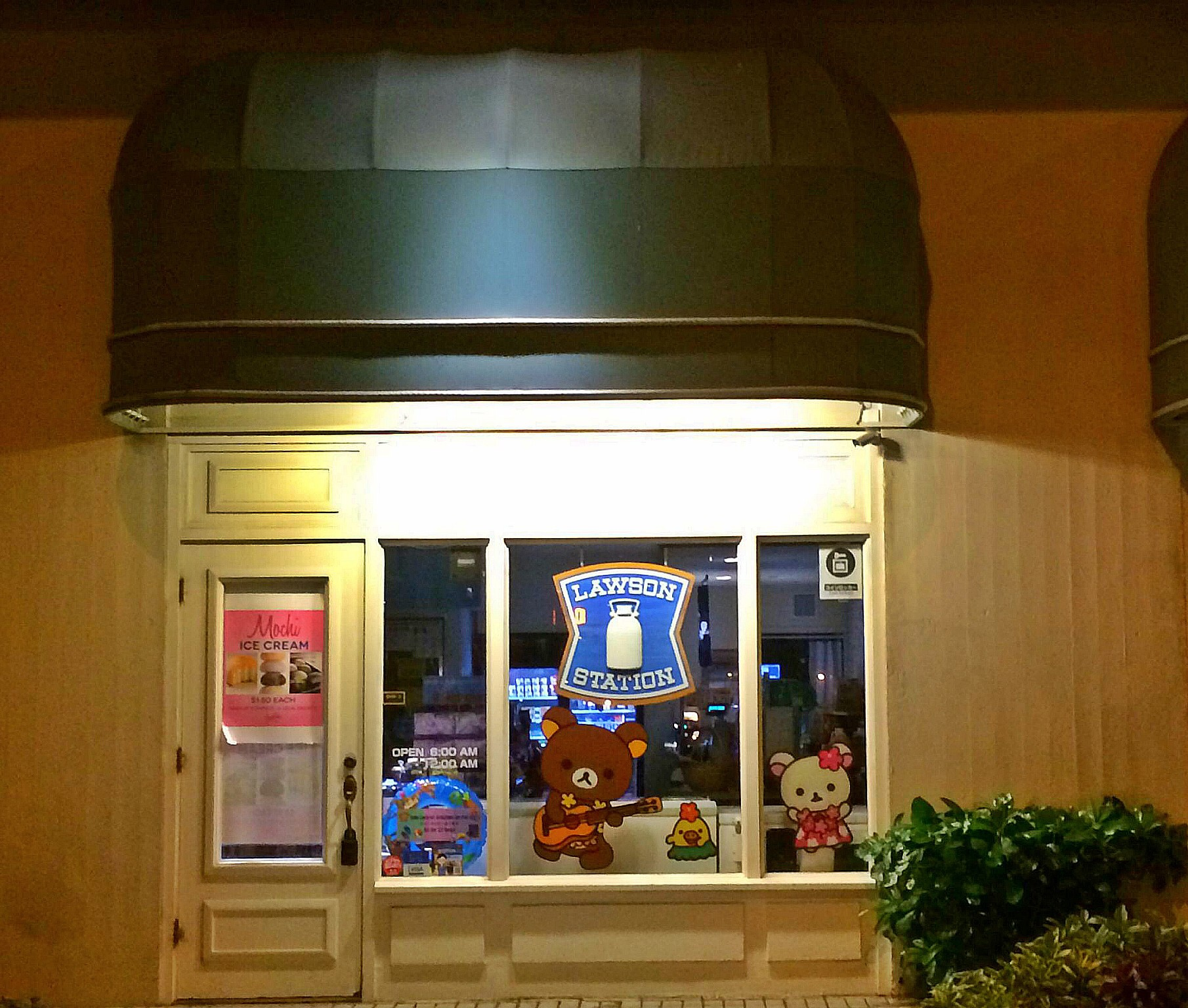
Lawson at the Moana Surfrider, A Westin Resort & Spa, Honolulu, Hawaii

With the establishment of "Lawson USA Hawaii, Inc.", Lawson returned to the U.S. market, with two locations in Honolulu opening on July 7, 2012. One of the stores is in the Sheraton Waikiki, while the other is in the Moana Hotel.

=== Thailand ===
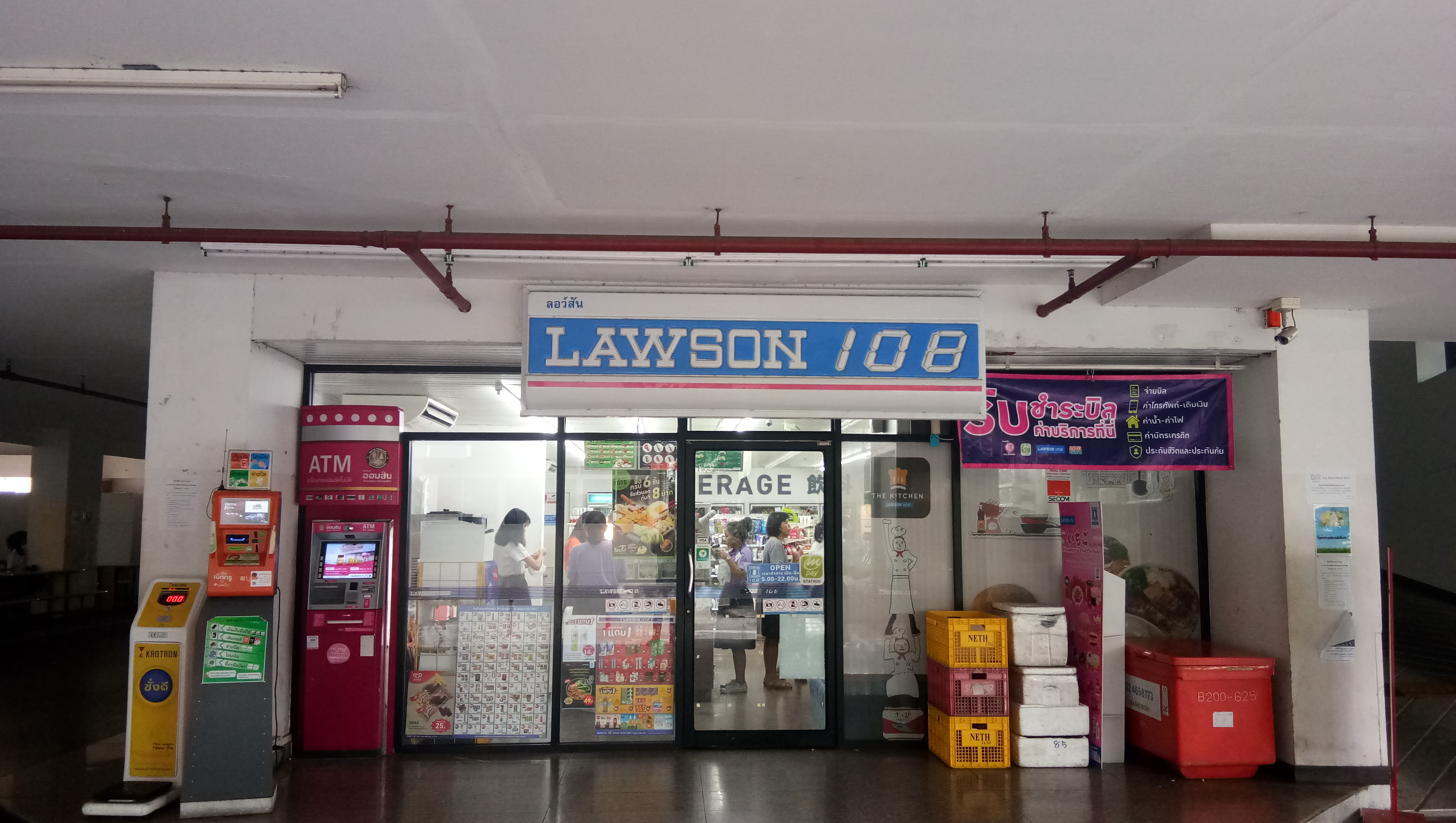
Lawson 108 in Bangkok, Thailand

In 2013, Lawson began opening stores in Thailand under the name Lawson 108. The stores are run as a joint venture between Lawson Japan and the Thai consumer goods giant Saha Group.

=== The Philippines ===
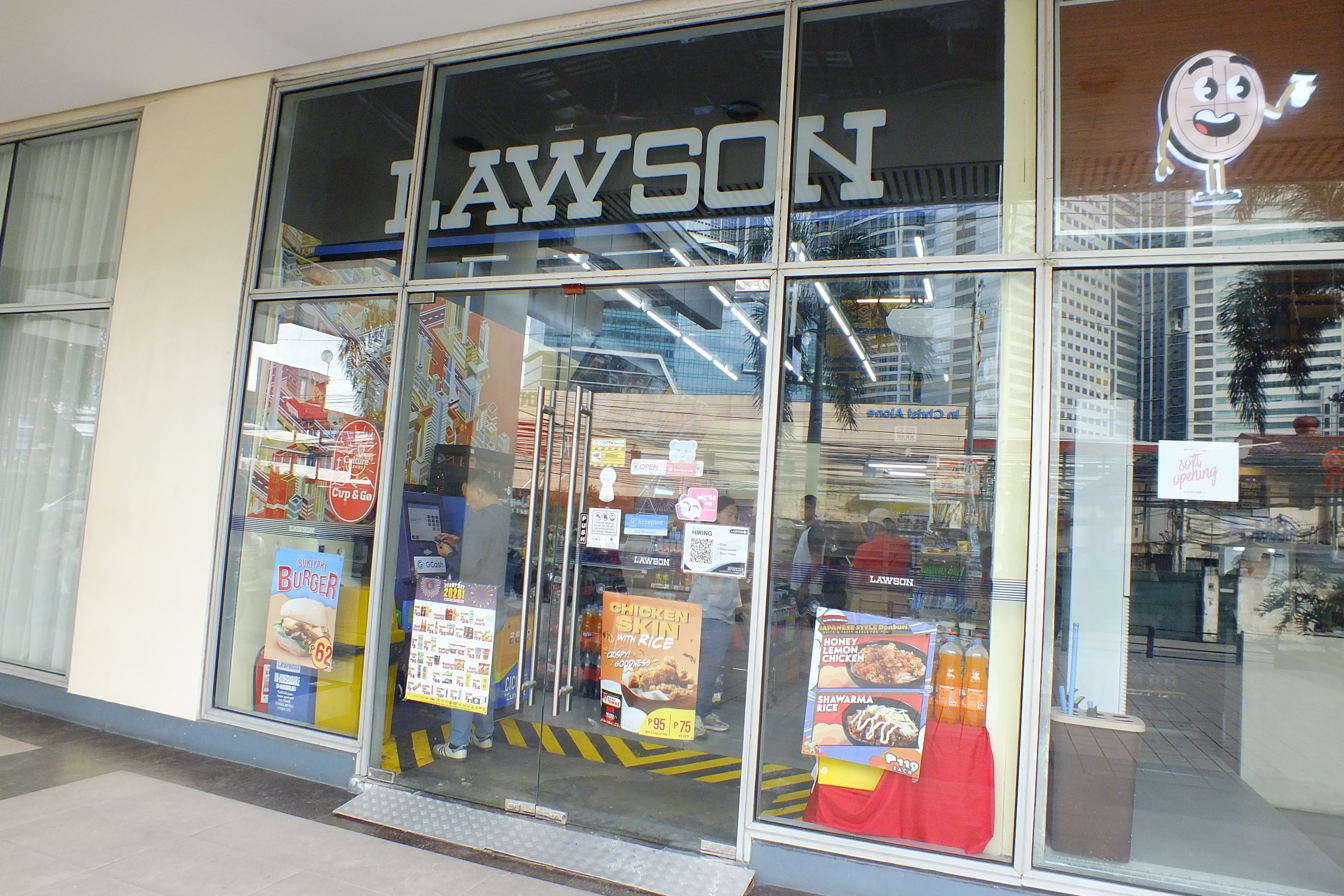
Lawson in Quezon City, Philippines

Lawson Asia Pacific and Puregold Price Club formed a joint venture under the name PG Lawson Company Inc. They opened their first branch in Manila, on March 30, 2015. Under the partnership, Lawson will provide its expertise in convenience store's know-how and product development while Puregold will provide its expertise in product procurement and localized knowledge of retail consumers. They plan to open 500 stores by 2020. However, in 2018, Puregold sold its 70 percent stake to Lawson after the said company exited the convenience store business. Despite the Puregold exit, the Philippine branches of Lawson continued to operate until they found a new partnership.

In 2019, Lawson has partnered with Ayala Corporation and struck a deal of partnership, continuing to expand its footprint in the country to 500 stores by 2024. The store chain is also considering a collaboration with Ayala's online retail business, such as contributing convenience stores to be used as product pickup depots as well as the operational tie-up with a logistics group company.

=== India ===
In February 2026, Lawson announced plans to enter the Indian market with the first store scheduled to open in Mumbai in 2027 and a long-term goal of operating 10,000 stores nationwide by 2050.

== See also ==
- Loppi (ticketing system)
