= Ferdinand Mang =

German politician (born 1978)

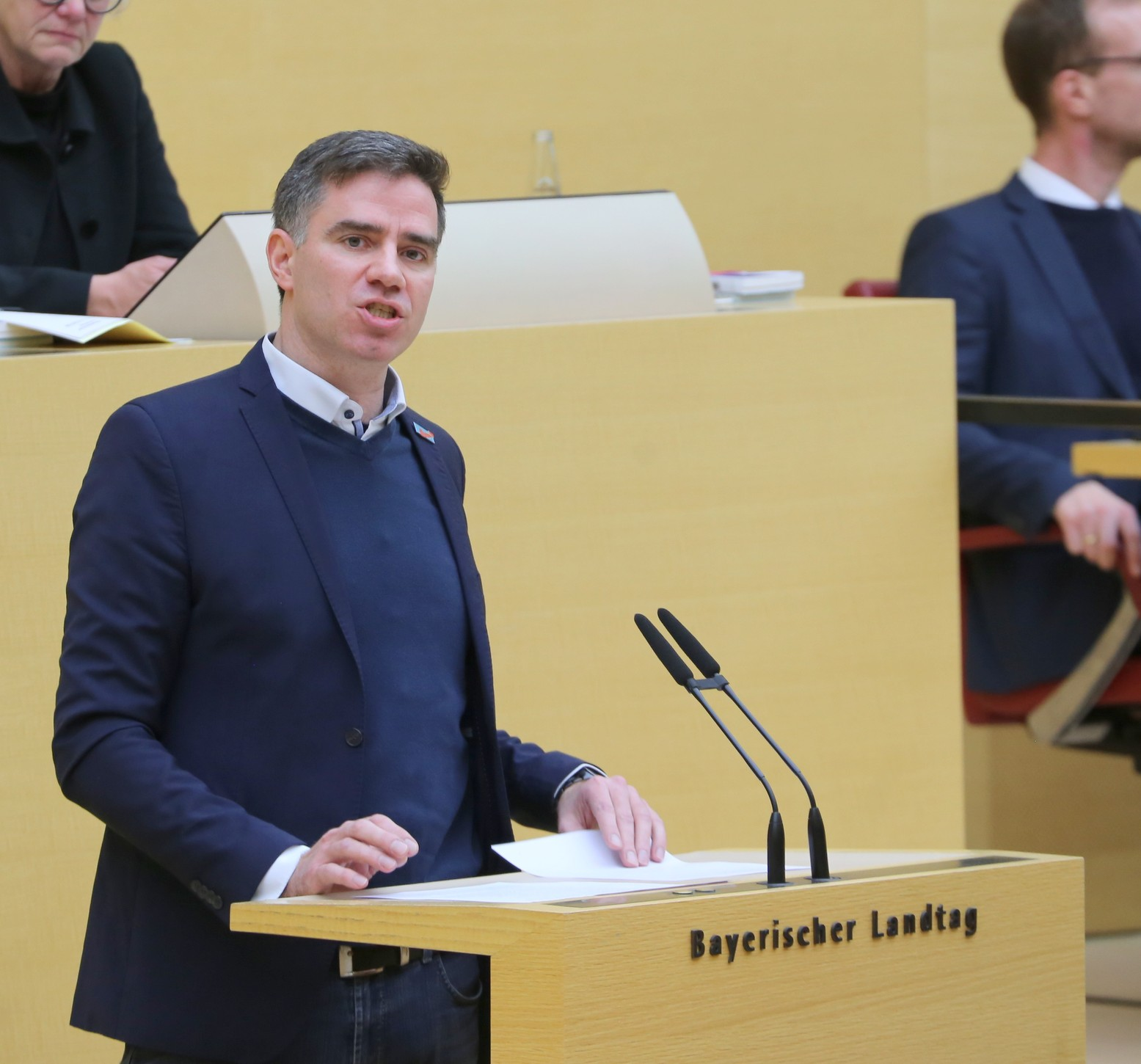
- Mang in 2022

Member of the Landtag of Bavaria
- Incumbent
- Assumed office 5 November 2018
- Constituency: Middle Franconia

Personal details
- Born: 11 August 1978 (age 47) Nuremberg
- Party: Alternative for Germany (since 2017)

Ferdinand Mang (born 11 August 1978 in Nuremberg) is a German politician serving as a member of the Landtag of Bavaria since 2018. He has served as chairman of the Alternative for Germany in Roth, Hilpoltstein and Allersberg since 2025.
