= Man from Del Monte =

Advertising campaign for Del Monte

Brian Jackson as the man from Del Monte in an advertisement for peaches

The Man from Del Monte was a worldwide advertising campaign for Del Monte. A series of 25 television advertisements ran from 1985 to 1991, featuring British actor Brian Jackson in the title role. The man, wearing a linen suit and Panama hat, arrived at various plantations to assess the quality of the produce for sale under the Del Monte brand. The man indicated his approval upon which the workers would celebrate, stating that "The man from Del Monte, he say yes!". The campaign was revived in Spain and Italy in 2015, with a younger actor.

== Original campaign ==
The original campaign ran 25 television advertisements in 30 countries between 1985 and 1991. The advertisement featured the "man from Del Monte", an inspector for the food company who travelled the world checking the quality of produce before approving it to be sold under the Del Monte brand. The advertisements typically opened with a soft-focus pan shot of a fruit plantation with workers preparing goods. The man from Del Monte then often arrived in a flamboyant means such as by seaplane, helicopter or sports car. The man, European wearing a tropical linen suit and Panama hat, examined the fruit crop while the workers looked on nervously. After tasting the fruit, the man signalled his approval, upon which the workers burst into celebration exclaiming "The man from Del Monte, he say yes!". The man never spoke but indicated his approval with a nod and extension of the index finger. The campaign was masterminded by American marketing company McCann Erickson.

=== Actor ===
One of the actors used in the campaign was British actor Brian Jackson. An American actor had originally been cast, but test screenings showed the audience considered him a sinister figure. Del Monte recognised that most of its customers were female and wanted to depict a trusted male character; they set requirements that the part be played by a white, cosmopolitan-looking man, aged over 40. A casting director at Thames Television recommended Jackson as meeting the brief and, after a one-off casting in London, he was selected for the part.

Jackson was contracted to appear in five television advertisements a year, made for various national branches of Del Monte. Jackson's schedule left him unable to appear in one of the films and a stand-in was used for his hands.

British actor Edward Jewesbury also appeared as "the man" in one of the campaign's advertisements.

=== Filming locations ===
The advertisements were filmed in the United Kingdom, United States, South Africa, Kenya, Italy and Canada, but never in South America, despite its association with fruit production. Though associated with a white suit, the man's suit was actually cream in all but one advertisement. His shirts were white or cream silk and on one occasion he wore an old school tie. Different Panama hats were worn when filming advertisements for different regions of Del Monte.

=== Reception ===
Jackson felt that the advertisements led him to being typecast and that his television acting career suffered for it. He did, however, become popular for other advertising campaigns and featured in advertisements for Gucci, Mastercard, Mercedes, BMW and Barclays.

Del Monte intended the man to personify their approach to quality control. However, the portrayal has been described as colonial in attitude with a white, "distinguished, aristocratic" man visiting plantations staffed by African and Hispanic workers who awaited his approval. The advertisement has been much parodied.

== 2010s revival ==
The man from Del Monte returned to television in December 2015 with a new advertising campaign in Italy and Spain. The revival was developed by Mediaset. It features a younger actor, wearing a white shirt and Panama hat, impressing a lady with the quality of his pineapple.
