= Silver Swan (brand) =

Filipino condiments brand

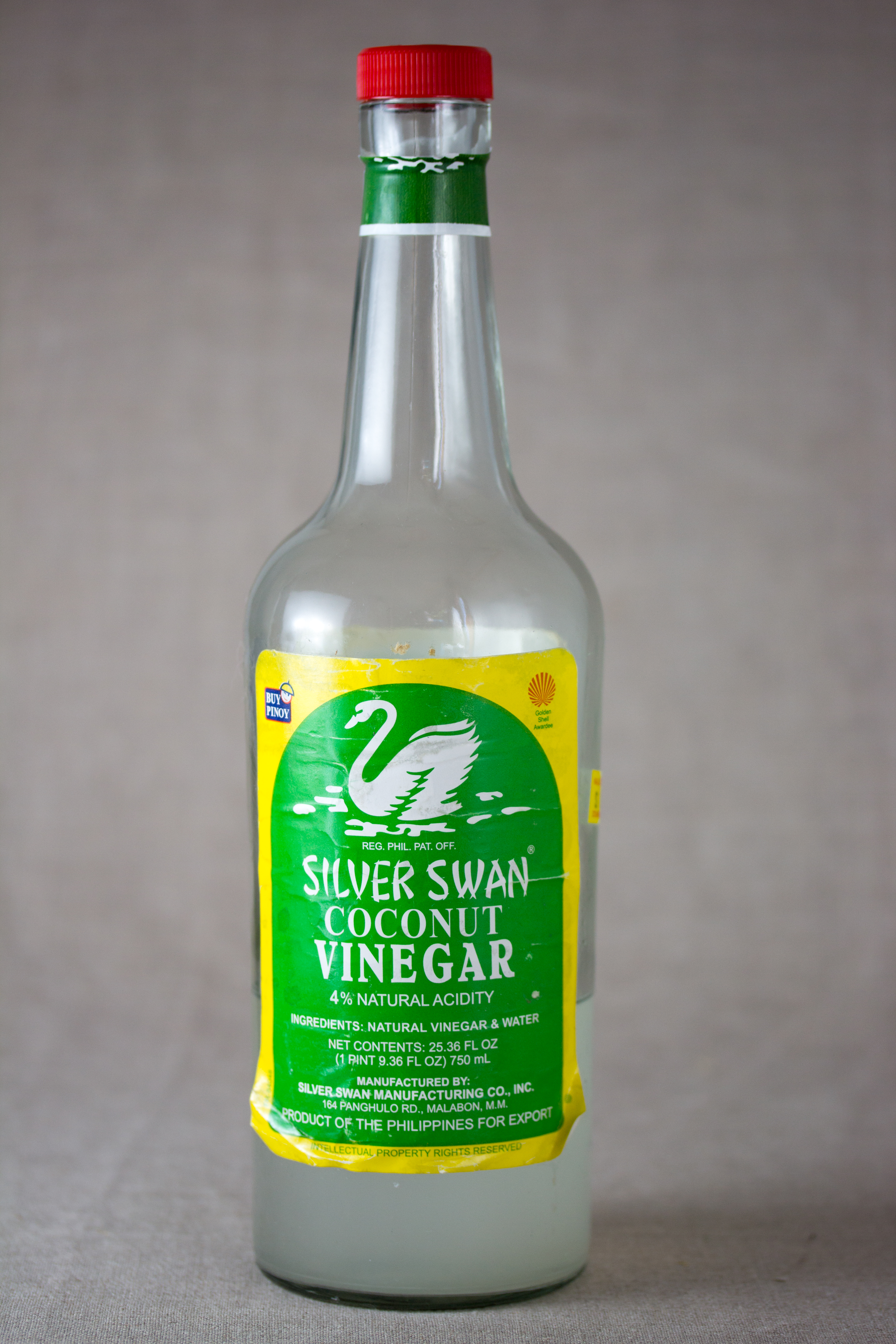
- Silver Swan Coconut Vinegar
- Product type: Vinegar; Soy sauce; Fish sauce; Oyster sauce; Chili sauce; Other Philippine condiments
- Current owner: NutriAsia (through First PGMC Enterprises, Inc.)
- Country: Philippines
- Introduced: 1943; 83 years ago
- Markets: Philippines; North America; Australia
- Previous owners: Silver Swan Manufacturing Co., Inc.
- Website: Silver Swan website

Silver Swan is a Filipino condiments brand owned by NutriAsia through its subsidiary, First PGMC Enterprises, Inc. It was first introduced as a soy sauce brand in 1942. Later on, the brand was expanded to include vinegar, fish sauce, chili sauce, oyster sauce, and other Filipino specialty condiments.

== History ==
Established in the early 1940s, Silver Swan began with the manufacture of its soy sauce in Malabon. The brand name "Silver Swan" was a pun on the name of its original owner, Filipino entrepreneur Sy Bun Suan, who put up a small-scale, family-owned venture in Manila Chinatown. Silver Swan has since expanded its production of condiments and food products from soy sauce to vinegar, fish sauce, salted black beans, chili sauce, hot sauce, oyster sauce, and Worcestershire sauce.

== Products ==
Silver Swan condiments and products include:

- Silver Swan Soy Sauce
- Silver Swan Sukang Puti
- Silver Swan Cane Vinegar
- Silver Swan Sukang-Hang (Spicy Vinegar)
- Silver Swan Patis
- Silver Swan Salted Black Beans
- Silver Swan Old English Worcestershire Sauce
- Silver Swan Oyster Sauce
- Silver Swan Sweet Chili Sauce
- Silver Swan Sweet Spicy Chili Sauce
- Silver Swan Hot Sauce
- Silver Swan Wow Sarap (All-in-One Seasoning Granules)
- Silver Swan Adobo Sauce
- Silver Swan Lauriat Special Soy Sauce
