= NutriAsia =

Philippine multinational food processing company

Nutri-Asia, Inc.
- Logo used since 2009
- Trade name: NutriAsia
- Formerly: Enriton Natural Foods, Inc. (1990–1996)
- Type: Private
- Industry: Food processing
- Predecessors: Southeast Asia Food, Inc. (1991–2009); Heinz-UFC Philippines, Inc. (2001–2006); UFC Philippines, Inc. (2006–2009)
- Founded: October 1, 1990; 35 years ago
- Founder: Joselito D. Campos Jr.
- Headquarters: JY Campos Centre, 9th Avenue corner 30th Street, Bonifacio Global City, Taguig, Metro Manila, Philippines
- Area served: Worldwide
- Key people: Joselito D. Campos Jr. (Chairman); Angie Flaminiano (President and CEO)
- Products: Sauces; Seasonings; Herbs; Spices; Cooking oils; Packaged foods; Beverages; Dairy products
- Brands: Alcopro; Amihan; Big2; Datu Puti; Golden Fiesta; Jufran; Locally; Mafran; Mang Tomas; Nelicom; Papa; Silver Swan; UFC
- Revenue: ▲ ₱133.9 million (2023)
- Number of employees: 693 (2023)
- Subsidiaries: Del Monte Pacific Limited; First PGMC Industries, Inc.
- Website: www.nutriasia.com

Nutri-Asia, Inc. (doing business as NutriAsia), formerly Enriton Natural Foods, Inc. and its predecessors Southeast Asia Food, Inc. and UFC Philippines, Inc., is a Philippine privately-held multinational food processing company headquartered in Bonifacio Global City, Taguig, Metro Manila. It is the leading producer of condiment products in the Philippines. Among its best known brands are Datu Puti, Mang Tomas, UFC and Silver Swan. As of 2019, NutriAsia has a total of 116 distribution networks locally and internationally.

The company was founded on October 1, 1990 by Joselito D. Campos Jr., the eldest son of Unilab founder and Marcos crony Jose Yao Campos. Campos is also the vice chairman of Del Monte Foods and Del Monte Philippines and the chairman of Fort Bonifacio Development Corporation.

== History ==
Joselito Campos established Enriton Natural Foods, Inc. in 1990, with Nelicom as its lone brand. Later that year, Enriton acquires Jufran and Mafran, while also entering a joint venture with Acres & Acres. The joint venture would then be called Southeast Asia Food Inc. (SAFI). In 1996, SAFI acquires the Universal Foods Corporation (UFC), and establishes the holding company NutriAsia, Inc. for the acquisition.

In 2001, NutriAsia partnered with American company H.J. Heinz Company (now Kraft Heinz) to form the joint venture Heinz-UFC Philippines, Inc., which operated until 2006.

In 2006, the company acquired Heinz's 50 percent stake in the joint venture and would be renamed as UFC Philippines, Inc.

Also in 2006, NutriAsia acquired Singapore-based Del Monte Pacific Limited for the ownership of 85% stake with San Miguel Corporation, DMPL was a joint venture between SMC and NutriAsia until 2007. In 2007, the company bought SMC's 25% stake in the joint venture and became a 100% ownership of DMPL. Since then, Del Monte Pacific Limited is a wholly owned subsidiary of NutriAsia.

In 2009, the company's subsidiaries include Southeast Asia Food, Inc. (SAFI) and UFC Philippines, Inc. were absorbed into the holding company NutriAsia, Inc.

In 2014, NutriAsia acquired Silver Swan Manufacturing Company, Inc. from the Suan family, and later renamed the company as First PGMC Enterprises, Inc.

=== 2018 labor strike ===
On June 4, 2018, 200 people composed of NutriAsia workers and supporters, under the leadership of an entity called Nagkakaisang Manggagawa ng (United Workers of) NutriAsia, staged a labor protest, forming a picket line at its factory in Marilao, Bulacan.

On February 23, 2018, reports from the Philippine Department of Labor and Employment (DOLE) said that it had directed NutriAsia to "give regular employment to 914 persons" who had been hired under their contractors Alternative Network Resources Unlimited Multipurpose Cooperative; Serbiz Multi-Purpose Cooperative; and B-Mirk Enterprises Corp (B-Mirk), because their work arrangements were considered labor-only subcontracting, which is not allowed by the Philippines' labor code. However, NutriAsia rejected this interpretation.

Workers of B-Mirk, citing contractualization practices and unsafe conditions, decided to form a union. The officers of this union were laid off, and those suspected of being members said that they were threatened with suspensions.

On June 25, 2018, DOLE Region 3 office reversed the February decision, saying that the workers who went on strike had an "employer-employee relationship" with B-Mirk, rather than with NutriAsia. The protesters continued to picket the Marilao site.

On June 30, 2018, the protesters held an ecumenical mass at the picket site, with about 300 people in attendance including the protesters and numerous supporters. As the mass ended, police forces arrived to disperse the crowd. The dispersal that followed saw at least 30 individuals injured. Nineteen persons were arrested, including 14 who were either workers or supporters; and five journalists who were covering the celebration of the mass.

Two of the five journalists arrested were campus journalists Psalty Caluza and Jon Bonifacio, both students at the University of the Philippines Diliman. At the time, Caluza was a fourth year journalism student from the UP College of Mass Communication, who was taking an internship with media organization AlterMidya. Bonifacio, an Oblation scholar and who was vying for graduation with honors, was covering the event for Scientia, the student publication of the UP College of Science.

The violent dispersal was quickly condemned by the DOLE and by religious leaders, including Catholic Auxiliary Bishop Broderick Pabillo and the ecumenical non-catholic National Council of Churches in the Philippines (NCCP), and was widely criticized by the public on social media.

The Philippine Commission on Human Rights expressed concern and CHR spokesperson Jacqueline Ann C. de Guia announced that they would investigate the violent dispersal of the protesters.

In 2019, a workers' strike in its Cabuyao, Laguna factory ended with the Philippine National Police (PNP) violently dispersing the striking workers.

== Products ==
Its products include sauces, seasonings, herbs, spices, cooking oils, packaged foods, beverages and dairy products.

In 2015, the company entered the beverage market with the launch of its own juice brand, Locally, followed by Big2 Purified Water in 2018. It also entered the dairy market in 2023, with the launch of UFC Quesorap processed cheese.

== Operations ==
Since 2013, NutriAsia has been headquartered at the JY Campos Centre, located in 9th Avenue corner 30th Street, Bonifacio Global City, Taguig, Metro Manila. In addition, it has four factories across the Philippines: Marilao (Bulacan), Cabuyao (Laguna), Cebu City (Cebu) and Davao City (Davao del Sur). As of 2023, the company has a presence in over 50 countries worldwide.

== Subsidiaries ==
=== Current subsidiaries ===
- Nutri-Asia, Inc.
  - First PGMC Enterprises, Inc.
  - Del Monte Pacific Limited
    - Del Monte Philippines, Inc.
      - Del Monte Vinamilk Dairy Philippines, Inc. (joint venture with Vinamilk)
    - Del Monte Foods, Inc.
      - Del Monte Argentina S.A.
      - Hi Continental Corporation
      - College Inn Foods
      - DLM Foods Canada Corporation
      - Del Monte Colombiana S.A.
      - The Meow Mix Company, LLC
      - Meow Mix Decatur Productions I, LLC
      - S&W Fine Foods, Inc.
      - Contadina Foods, Inc.
      - Del Monte Foods Ecuador DME C.A.
      - Del Monte Peru S.A.C.
      - Del Monte Andina C.A.
      - Industrias Citricolas de Montemorelos S.A. de C.V.

=== Former subsidiaries ===
- Heinz-UFC Philippines, Inc. (joint venture with H.J. Heinz Company)
- UFC Philippines, Inc.
- Southeast Asia Food, Inc.

== See also ==
- List of food companies
