= UFC (food brand) =

Philippine food brand

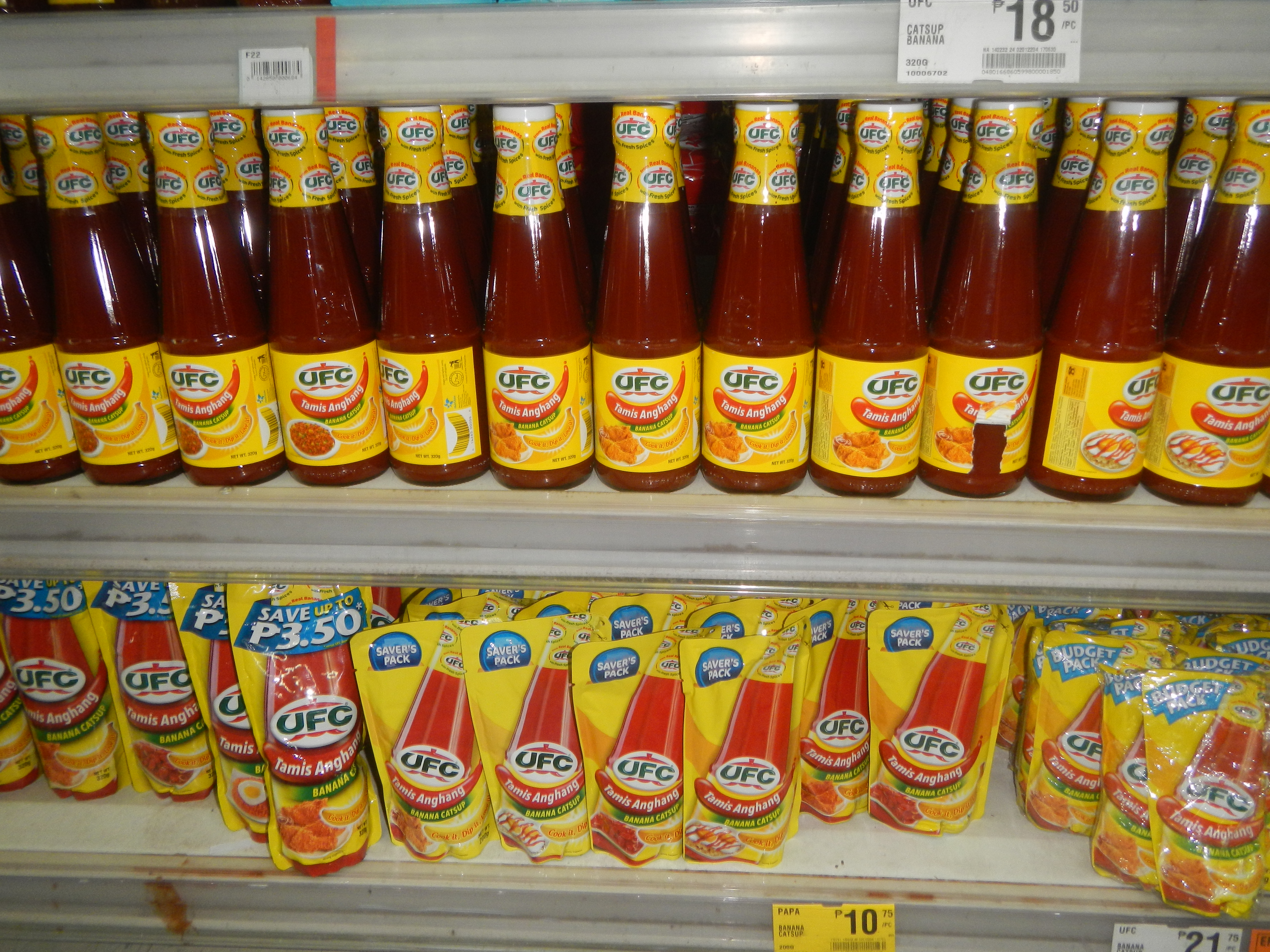
- Product type: Banana ketchup
- Current owner: NutriAsia
- Produced by: NutriAsia
- Country: Philippines
- Introduced: 1969; 57 years ago
- Markets: Worldwide
- Previous owners: Universal Foods Corporation (1969–1996); Southeast Asia Food, Inc. (1996–2001); Heinz-UFC Philippines, Inc. (2001–2006); UFC Philippines, Inc. (2006–2010)
- Website: UFC website

3D logo

UFC is a Philippine food brand owned by NutriAsia. It was first introduced as a banana ketchup brand in 1969.

== History ==
Banana ketchup was deemed a cheaper alternative than tomato ketchup since bananas were abundant in the Philippines. Philippine food technologist Maria Y. Orosa (1893–1945) is credited with inventing the banana ketchup recipe.

Coincidentally, Magdalo V. Francisco came up with his own method of making ketchup using bananas in 1938. Francisco began commercial production of banana ketchup in 1942 under the brand name Mafran, a portmanteau derived from the first syllables of his first name and surname. He registered Mafran as a trademark with the Bureau of Patents in the Philippines.

Years later, Francisco approached Tirso T. Reyes for funding to expand his business. This led to the establishment of the Universal Food Corporation in 1960, whose first President was Jaime Datu Reyes. Francisco soon left the company due to internal conflicts. Francisco established Jufran Food Industries and launched Jufran Banana Catsup. The name Jufran was derived from Francisco's son and namesake, Magdalo "Jun" Francisco Jr.

In 1969, Universal Foods Corporation launched UFC Tamis Anghang Banana Catsup, made from a unique recipe which combines the sweetness preferred by the Filipino palate with a spicy aftertaste, hence, tamis-anghang (Tagalog for sweet-spicy).

In 1974, Universal Foods Corporation was acquired by Bancom Development Corporation.

In 1996, Southeast Asia Food, Inc. (SAFI, now NutriAsia) acquired Universal Foods Corporation. SAFI had also acquired the Mafran and Jufran brands. SAFI evolved into what is now NutriAsia, Inc.

== See also ==
- Banana ketchup
