= Datu Puti =

Brand owned by NutriAsia, Inc.

- Product type: Vinegar; Soy sauce; Fish sauce; Oyster sauce
- Current owner: NutriAsia
- Produced by: NutriAsia
- Country: Philippines
- Introduced: 1975; 51 years ago
- Markets: Worldwide
- Previous owners: Southeast Asia Food, Inc.
- Website: Datu Puti website

Datu Puti is a condiment brand owned by NutriAsia, Inc. (formerly known as Southeast Asia Food, Inc.). Datu Puti was first introduced as a vinegar product in 1975 by Hernan and Ismael Reyes. Eventually, soy sauce and fish sauce under the Datu Puti brand were introduced in the 1990s. An oyster sauce product was also introduced.

== Branding ==
Datu Puti is a combination of Datu, the surname of founders’ mother, and the Filipino word for white ("putî"), which is a common color for sukang paombóng (traditional palm vinegar). The logo used for the brand features the image of a precolonial datu.

The mukhasim (translated in English as "sour face", is a portmanteau of the Filipino words mukhâ; lit. 'face', and asim; lit. 'sour') marketing campaign was instrumental to the brand's recognition. The campaign was launched in the early 1980s which featured the comedian Conrado "Pugak" Piring, making a facial expression of having consumed something sour, dubbed as the "mukhasim" look.

== Products ==
- Datu Puti White Vinegar
- Datu Puti Original
  - Datu Puti Sukang Iloko
  - Datu Puti Sukang Sinamak
  - Datu Puti Pinoy Spice
- Datu Puti Soy Sauce
- Datu Puti Toyomixes
  - Datu Puti Toyomansi
  - Datu Puti Toyochili
  - Datu Puti Toyomagic
- Datu Puti Fish Sauce
- Datu Puti Natural Selections:
  - Natural Cane Vinegar
  - Premium Soy Sauce
  - Brewed Soy Sauce
  - Thai Fish Sauce
- Datu Puti Adobo Series
  - Classic Adobo
  - Spicy Adobo
  - Pininyahang Adobo
  - Adobo sa Gata
  - Humba
- Datu Puti Oyster Sauce
- Datu Puti Barbecue Marinade
- Datu Puti Pares Pack (Vinegar & Soy Sauce)

== Market share ==
In August 2011, it was reported the Datu Puti is the Philippine market leader in vinegar. In the same report, the brand also leads in Luzon when it comes to soy sauce.
