= Mang Tomas =

Brand owned by NutriAsia

- Product type: Sauce
- Current owner: NutriAsia
- Produced by: NutriAsia
- Country: Philippines
- Introduced: In 1986
- Markets: Worldwide
- Previous owners: Southeast Asia Food, Inc. (1991–2010)
- Tagline: "Sarap espesyal araw-araw"; "Macho Ganado"; "Sarsa ng Bayan"

Mang Tomas (Filipino for "Mr. Tomas") is a condiment brand owned by NutriAsia. Its core product is lechon sauce. The brand was developed by Hernan and Ismael Reyes in the late 1980s after they purchased the lechon sauce recipe of Aling Pitang lechon shop located in Quiapo, Manila. The Reyeses named their sauce "Mang Tomas Sarsa", after a popular lechon shop located in La Loma, Manila. In 1991, the brand was acquired by Southeast Asia Food, Inc. (SAFI, now NutriAsia). The product is presently sold as "Mang Tomas All-Around Sarsa" in the Philippines and as "Mang Tomas All-Purpose Sauce" in export markets.

Unlike the traditional lechon sauce, Mang Tomas is made without ground liver. Liver was a listed ingredient in the internationally available Mang Tomas products until 2017 but has since been removed from the label.

As of 2022, all Mang Tomas variations reinclude pork liver as an ingredient.

== Products ==
- Mang Tomas All-Around Sarsa
- Mang Tomas Siga Hot & Spicy All-Around Sarsa
- Mang Tomas Lechon Paksiw Sauce
