= Brian Jackson (actor) =

British actor (1931–2022)

- Playing Private Godfrey in the Dad's Army stage show (2007)
- Born: Osmond Brian Jackson; 6 April 1931; Bolton, Lancashire, England
- Died: 2 July 2022 (aged 91)
- Occupations: Actor, photographer and producer
- Years active: 1958–2019
- Spouses: Irene Berry (divorced); Eunice Gayson (m. 1968–1977); Ann Barker (m. 1998)
- Children: 5

Osmond Brian Jackson (6 April 1931 – 2 July 2022) was a British actor, photographer and producer who was especially famous as "The Man from Del Monte".

== Life and career ==
Jackson was born on 6 April 1931 in Bolton, Lancashire, England. He was the middle child of John and Gladys Jackson (née Hughes). He began his career as a Fleet Air Arm photographer and cameraman, a job which resulted in him leaving Thornleigh Salesian College when it began to take up the majority of his time.

Jackson then spent many years in the theatre appearing in plays with repertory seasons at the Old Vic and the Royal Shakespeare Company at Stratford-upon-Avon and London. In 1969–70, he appeared in Mame at the Theatre Royal, Drury Lane, starring Ginger Rogers.

He was a regular actor on TV and BBC radio drama. For several years Jackson was exclusively contracted worldwide as The Man from Del Monte, filming 25 commercials shown in 32 countries.

In addition to his acting career, Jackson owned and ran several TV production and international distribution companies from his photographic, film and recording studios at Hampden Gurney Studios complex at Marble Arch in London.

Jackson was married to, and divorced from, Irene Berry, and they had a son and daughter. He also had a daughter with actress Eunice Gayson, to whom he was married from 1968 to 1977. He was married to Ann Barker from 1998 until his death. They had a daughter, and he had another son from another relationship.

Jackson died from prostate cancer in London on 2 July 2022, at the age of 91.

== Filmography ==
Year	Title	Role	Notes
1958	Carry On Sergeant	Second Recruit	
1961	Gorgo	Army Officer	Uncredited
1961	Taste of Fear	Plainclothes Officer	Uncredited
1962	Some Like It Cool	Mike Hall	
1965	The Heroes of Telemark	Norwegian Naval Attache	Uncredited
1974	Escort Girls	Harvey Matelow	
1976	The Deadly Females	Tony	
1978	Revenge of the Pink Panther	Police Chief	
1992	Shadowchaser	President	
1997	Mrs Brown	Secretary	Uncredited
1998	The Big Swap	The Professor	
2008	Ealing Comedy	Obi-Wan Kenobi / Alec Guinness	
2008	Cash and Curry	Brian	
2012	Le Baiser/The kiss (shortfilm)	Jake	
2018	Coulda, Woulda, Shoulda	Denis	
2019	Saint Maud	Drummer	Final film role
